= Ana Gabriel singles discography =

This is the singles discography for Mexican singer Ana Gabriel.

== Singles ==
| Year | Title | Chart positions | | | | | | | | | | Album |
| Year | Title | MEX | CHI | COL | ECU | ESV | PAN | PER | PR | VEN | US Latin | Album |
|---|---|---|---|---|---|---|---|---|---|---|---|---|
| 1979 | "No Me Mires a los Ojos" | – | – | – | – | – | – | – | – | – | – | Non-album singles |
| 1980 | "Déjalos" | – | – | – | – | – | – | – | – | – | – | Non-album singles |
| 1984 | "Búscame" | – | – | – | – | – | – | – | – | – | – | Un estilo |
| 1986 | "Lo quiero todo" | – | – | – | – | – | – | – | – | – | – | Un estilo |
| 1986 | "A tu lado" | – | – | – | – | – | – | – | – | – | – | Sagitario |
| 1986 | "Y aquí estoy" | – | – | – | – | – | – | – | – | – | – | Sagitario |
| 1986 | "Eso no basta" | – | – | – | – | – | – | – | – | – | – | Sagitario |
| 1986 | "Besos prohibidos" | – | – | – | – | – | – | – | – | – | – | Sagitario |
| 1986 | "Malvado" | – | – | – | – | – | – | – | – | – | 48 | Sagitario |
| 1987 | "¡Ay, Amor!" | 1 | – | 4 | – | – | – | – | – | – | 1 | Pecado Original |
| 1988 | "Pecado Original" | 8 | – | – | – | – | – | – | – | – | 14 | Pecado Original |
| 1988 | "Es el Amor Quien Llega" | 14 | – | – | – | – | – | – | – | – | 5 | Tierra de Nadie |
| 1989 | "Simplemente Amigos" | 3 | 2 | – | 8 | 1 | 2 | 5 | – | – | 1 | Tierra de Nadie |
| 1989 | "No Digas No" | – | – | – | – | – | – | – | – | – | 6 | Tierra de Nadie |
| 1989 | "Soledad" | 8 | – | – | – | – | – | – | – | – | 2 | Tierra de Nadie |
| 1989 | "Hice Bien Quererte" | 5 | 4 | – | 5 | – | – | 9 | – | – | 14 | Quién Como Tú |
| 1990 | "Quién Como Tú" | 4 | – | – | – | 2 | – | 6 | 1 | – | 1 | Quién Como Tú |
| 1990 | "Ni Un Roce" | 3 | – | – | – | – | – | – | – | – | 4 | Quién Como Tú |
| 1990 | "Es Demasiado Tarde" | – | – | 1 | 1 | – | – | – | – | – | 1 | Personalidad: 20 Éxitos |
| 1990 | "Destino" | 5 | – | – | – | – | – | – | – | – | 10 | En Vivo |
| 1991 | "Hasta Que Te Conocí" | – | 6 | – | – | – | – | – | – | – | 25 | En Vivo |
| 1991 | "En La Oscuridad" | 6 | – | – | – | – | – | – | – | – | – | En Vivo |
| 1991 | "Ahora" | – | 9 | 4 | – | – | 6 | – | 10 | 10 | 2 | Mi México |
| 1991 | "Sin problemas" | – | 2 | 2 | – | – | – | – | – | – | 12 | Mi México |
| 1991 | "No entiendo" | – | – | 1 | – | – | – | – | – | – | – | Mi México |
| 1991 | "Mi Talismán" | – | – | – | – | – | – | – | – | – | – | Mi México |
| 1991 | "Voy a Ser" | – | – | – | – | – | – | – | – | – | – | Mi México |
| 1991 | "Hechizo" | – | – | – | – | – | – | – | – | – | – | Mi México |
| 1991 | "Mi Gusto Es" | – | – | – | – | – | – | – | – | – | 10 | Mi México |
| 1991 | "Cosas del Amor" (with Vikki Carr) | – | 2 | 5 | – | – | 1 | 6 | 6 | – | 1 | Cosas del Amor |
| 1992 | "Evidencias" | 1 | 1 | 6 | – | – | 2 | 5 | 2 | 10 | 1 | Silueta |
| 1992 | "Silueta" | 7 | – | – | – | – | – | – | – | – | 9 | Silueta |
| 1993 | "Todavía Tenemos Tiempo" | – | – | – | – | – | – | – | – | – | 6 | Silueta |
| 1993 | "Tu y Yo" | 14 | – | – | – | – | – | – | – | – | 5 | Silueta |
| 1993 | "Hay que Hablar" | – | – | – | – | – | – | – | – | – | 36 | Silueta |
| 1993 | "Amor Callado" (with Rocío Jurado) | – | – | – | – | – | – | – | – | – | 20 | Como las Alas al Viento |
| 1993 | "Luna" | 12 | – | – | – | – | – | – | – | 6 | 1 | Luna |
| 1994 | "Háblame de Frente" | 10 | – | 8 | – | – | 9 | – | – | – | 5 | Luna |
| 1994 | "Estas Emociones" | 11 | – | – | – | – | – | 3 | – | – | 15 | Luna |
| 1994 | "Pacto de Amor" | – | – | – | – | – | – | – | – | – | – | Luna |
| 1994 | "Tú lo decidiste" | – | – | – | – | – | – | – | – | – | 4 | Ayer y Hoy |
| 1994 | "Como Agua Para Chocolate" | – | – | – | – | – | – | – | – | – | 24 | Ayer y Hoy |
| 1994 | "No Tengo Dinero" | – | – | – | – | – | – | – | – | – | 30 | Ayer y Hoy |
| 1994 | "Parece Que Fue Ayer" | – | – | – | – | – | – | – | – | – | – | Ayer y Hoy |
| 1995 | "Rayando el Sol" | – | – | – | – | – | – | – | – | – | – | Ayer y Hoy |
| 1995 | "Boda Negra" | – | – | – | – | – | – | – | – | – | – | Joyas de dos siglos |
| 1995 | "Reconciliación" | – | – | – | – | – | – | – | – | – | – | Joyas de dos siglos |
| 1995 | "Un viejo amor" | – | – | – | – | – | – | – | – | – | – | Joyas de dos siglos |
| 1996 | "No te Hago Falta" | – | – | – | – | – | – | – | – | – | – | Vivencias |
| 1996 | "No Sabes" | – | – | – | – | – | – | – | – | – | – | Vivencias |
| 1996 | "Fue en Un Café" | – | – | – | – | – | – | – | – | – | – | Vivencias |
| 1997 | "A Pesar de Todos" | – | – | – | – | – | – | – | – | – | 2 | Con un mismo corazón |
| 1997 | "Con un mismo corazón" (with Vicente Fernández) | – | – | – | – | – | – | – | – | – | 38 | Con un mismo corazón |
| 1998 | "Paz en este Amor" | – | – | – | – | – | – | – | – | – | 35 | Con un mismo corazón |
| 1998 | "Me Equivoqué Contigo" | – | – | – | – | – | – | – | – | – | 21 | Con un mismo corazón |
| 1998 | "Quiero Vivir la Vida Amándote" (with Jon Secada) | – | – | – | – | – | – | – | – | – | – | Non-album single |
| 1998 | "Y Aquí Estoy" (Live) | – | – | – | – | – | – | – | – | – | – | ...En la Plaza de Toros México |
| 1999 | "Si Me Faltaras" | – | – | – | – | – | – | – | – | – | 30 | Soy como soy |
| 1999 | "Obsesión" | – | – | – | – | – | – | – | – | – | – | Soy como soy |
| 1999 | "No a Pedir Perdón" | – | – | – | – | – | 1 | – | – | – | – | Soy como soy |
| 1999 | "Me Haces Falta" | – | – | – | – | – | – | – | – | – | – | Soy como soy |
| 1999 | "Claro de Luna" | – | – | – | – | – | – | – | – | – | – | Soy como soy |
| 2000 | "Poquita Fe" | – | – | – | – | – | 9 | – | – | – | – | Eternamente |
| 2000 | "Historia de un Amor" | – | – | – | – | – | – | – | – | – | – | Eternamente |
| 2000 | "Por Ti" | – | – | – | – | – | – | – | – | – | – | Eternamente |
| 2001 | "Huelo a soledad" | – | – | – | – | – | – | – | – | – | 8 | Huelo a soledad |
| 2001 | "Cinco Días" | – | – | – | – | – | – | – | – | – | – | Huelo a soledad |
| 2001 | "Amigo Amante" | – | – | – | – | – | – | – | – | – | – | Huelo a soledad |
| 2003 | "La Reina" | – | – | – | – | – | – | – | – | – | – | Dulce y salado |
| 2003 | "Mariachi con Tambor" | – | – | – | – | – | – | – | – | – | – | Dulce y salado |
| 2005 | "Tú, sólo tú" | – | – | – | – | – | – | – | – | – | – | Selena ¡Vive! |
| 2005 | "Sin Tu Amor" | – | – | – | – | – | – | – | – | – | 39 | Dos amores un amante |
| 2006 | "Olvídate de Ellos" | – | – | – | – | – | – | – | – | – | – | Dos amores un amante |
| 2006 | "Desahogo" | – | – | – | – | – | – | – | – | – | – | Dos amores un amante |
| 2007 | "Y Aquí Estoy" (with K-Paz de la Sierra) | – | – | – | – | – | – | – | – | – | 31 | Conquistando Corazones |
| 2007 | "Te Diré" | – | – | – | – | – | – | – | – | – | 50 | Arpegios de Amor |
