= List of Billboard Regional Mexican Albums number ones of 2006 =

The Regional Mexican Albums, published in Billboard magazine, is a record chart that features Latin music sales information for regional styles of Mexican music. This data are compiled by Nielsen SoundScan from a sample that includes music stores, music departments at department stores and verifiable sales from concert venues in the United States.

== Albums ==
Issue date	Album	Artist(s)	Reference(s)
January 7	Antes Muertas Que Sencillas	Los Horóscopos de Durango	
January 14	Antes Muertas Que Sencillas	Los Horóscopos de Durango	
January 21	Antes Muertas Que Sencillas	Los Horóscopos de Durango	
January 28	Cronica De Dos Grandes: Los Inicios De Nuestra Historia	Grupo Bronco/Los Bukis	
February 4	Cronica De Dos Grandes: Los Inicios De Nuestra Historia	Grupo Bronco/Los Bukis	
February 11	Rancherisimas Con Banda	Graciela Beltran	
February 18	Antologia De Un Rey	Ramon Ayala y Sus Bravos del Norte	
February 25	Simplemente Lo Mejor	Alacranes Musical	
March 4	X	Intocable	
March 11	La Historia Del Rey	José Alfredo Jiménez	
March 18	Algo De Mi	Conjunto Primavera	
March 25	Algo De Mi	Conjunto Primavera	
April 1	Algo De Mi	Conjunto Primavera	
April 8	Algo De Mi	Conjunto Primavera	
April 15	Algo De Mi	Conjunto Primavera	
April 22	Historias Que Contar	Los Tigres del Norte	
April 29	Historias Que Contar	Los Tigres del Norte	
May 6	Historias Que Contar	Los Tigres del Norte	
May 13	Historias Que Contar	Los Tigres del Norte	
May 20	Borron Y Cuenta Nueva	Grupo Montez de Durango	
May 27	Borron Y Cuenta Nueva	Grupo Montez de Durango	
June 3	Borron Y Cuenta Nueva	Grupo Montez de Durango	
June 10	Borron Y Cuenta Nueva	Grupo Montez de Durango	
June 17	Borron Y Cuenta Nueva	Grupo Montez de Durango	
June 24	Tierra Extraña	Patrulla 81	
July 1	Borron Y Cuenta Nueva †	Grupo Montez de Durango	
July 8	A Paso Firme	Alacranes Musical	
July 15	A Paso Firme	Alacranes Musical	
July 22	Las No. 1 De La Reina	Diana Reyes	
July 29	Las No. 1 De La Reina	Diana Reyes	
August 5	Las No. 1 De La Reina	Diana Reyes	
August 12	A Paso Firme	Alacranes Musical	
August 19	30 Recuerdos	Los Bukis	
August 26	La Banda Del Carro Rojo	Los Tigres del Norte	
September 2	La Banda Del Carro Rojo	Los Tigres del Norte	
September 9	Rosas Rojas	Brazeros Musical de Durango	
September 16	Para Ti...Nuestra Historia	Conjunto Primavera	
September 23	La Historia De Javier Solis	Javier Solís	
September 30	La Historia De Javier Solis	Javier Solís	
October 7	La Historia De Javier Solis	Javier Solís	
October 14	Piensame Un Momento	Pesado	
October 21	La Historia De Javier Solis †	Javier Solís	
October 28	30 Recuerdos	Los Bukis	
November 4	30 Recuerdos	Los Bukis	
November 11	Crossroads: Cruce de Caminos	Intocable	
November 18	Crossroads: Cruce de Caminos	Intocable	
November 25	Crossroads: Cruce de Caminos	Intocable	
December 2	Conquistando Corazones	K-Paz de la Sierra	
December 9	La Tragedia Del Vaquero	Vicente Fernández	
December 16	La Tragedia Del Vaquero	Vicente Fernández	
December 23	La Tragedia Del Vaquero	Vicente Fernández	
December 30	La Reina Canta a México	Ana Gabriel	
