= Lo Nuestro Excellence Award =

American award for Latin music

- Awarded for: "lifetime contribution to Latin music"
- Country: United States
- Presented by: Univision
- First award: 1990
- Currently held by: Olga Tañón (2024)
- Website: univision.com/premiolonuestro

The Lo Nuestro Excellence Award (Spanish: Premio Lo Nuestro a la Excelencia) is an award honoring an artist's contribution to Latin music. It was first awarded at the 2nd Annual Lo Nuestro Awards in 1990 and has since been presented annually. The Lo Nuestro Awards were established by American television network Univision in 1989 to recognize the most talented performers of Latin music. Before the inception of the Latin Grammy Awards in 2000, the Lo Nuestro Awards were considered to be the Latin music equivalent of the Grammy Awards. Unlike the other award categories, where the nominees and winners are decided by the public through an online survey, the recipients of the Excellence Award are selected by Univision and Billboard magazine. The trophy awarded is shaped in the form of a treble clef. During the presentation, a tribute is held to the winner which features highlights of their career and several artists performing live covers of the recipient's notable songs.

The Excellence Award was first presented to Cuban singer Celia Cruz. Since its inception, the accolade has been mostly given to individuals, though five musical ensembles have also earned the achievement. Artists from Mexico have received the trophy more than any other nationalities with 16. Cuban-American singer Gloria Estefan was honored with the Excellence Award in 1992 while her husband Emilio Estefan was bestowed with the accolade two years later. They were both presented with the award again in 2018. Mexican singer Antonio Aguilar was given the accolade in 2000 and his son Pepe Aguilar earned it in 2012. Juan Luis Guerra was honored with the trophy in 2007 and was later recognized as Person of the Year by the Latin Recording Academy in the same year.

== Recipients ==
Year	Image	Recipient	Nationality	Ref.
1990 (2nd)	Celiz Cruz	Celia Cruz	Cuba; United States	
1991 (3rd)	Juan Gabriel	Juan Gabriel	Mexico	
1991 (3rd)	Plácido Domingo	Plácido Domingo	Spain	
1992 (4th)	Gloria Estefan	Gloria Estefan	Cuba; United States	
1993 (5th)	Armando Manzanero	Armando Manzanero	Mexico	
1994 (6th)	Emilio Estefan	Emilio Estefan	Cuba; United States	
1995 (7th)	Julio Iglesias	Julio Iglesias	Spain	
1996 (8th)	Marco Antonio Solís	Marco Antonio Solís	Mexico	
1997 (9th)	Mariachi Vargas de Tecalitlán	Mariachi Vargas de Tecalitlán	Mexico	
1998 (10th)	—	Los Panchos	United States	
1999 (11th)	Los Tigres del Norte	Los Tigres del Norte	United States	
2000 (12th)	Antonio Aguilar	Antonio Aguilar	Mexico	
2001 (13th)	Joan Sebastian	Joan Sebastian	Mexico	
2002 (14th)		José José	Mexico	
2003 (15th)		Luis Miguel	Mexico; United States	
2004 (16th)		Ricky Martin	Puerto Rico; United States	
2005 (17th)		Los Temerarios	Mexico	
2006 (18th)	Ana Gabriel	Ana Gabriel	Mexico	
2007 (19th)	Juan Luis Guerra	Juan Luis Guerra	Dominican Republic	
2008 (20th)	Vicente Fernández	Vicente Fernández	Mexico	
2009 (21st)	Emmanuel	Emmanuel	Mexico	
2010 (22nd)	Chayanne	Chayanne	Puerto Rico; United States	
2011 (23rd)	Maná	Maná	Mexico	
2012 (24th)		Pepe Aguilar	United States	
2013 (25th)	Alejandro Sanz	Alejandro Sanz	Spain	
2014 (26th)		Marc Anthony	United States	
2015 (27th)		Ricardo Arjona	Guatemala	
2016 (28th)	Carlos Vives	Carlos Vives	Colombia	
2017 (29th)	Romeo Santos	Romeo Santos	United States	
2018 (30th)		Emilio Estefan	Cuba; United States	
2018 (30th)		Gloria Estefan	Cuba; United States	
2019 (31st)	Roberto Carlos	Roberto Carlos	Brazil	
2020 (32nd)	Raphael	Raphael	Spain	
2021 (33rd)	Wisin	Wisin	Puerto Rico; United States	
2022 (34th)	Farruko	Farruko	Puerto Rico; United States	
2023 (35th)	Intocable	Intocable	United States	
2024 (36th)	Olga Tañón	Olga Tañón	Puerto Rico; United States	
2025 (37th)	Alejandro Fernández	Alejandro Fernández	Mexico; United States	
2026 (38th)		Paloma San Basilio	Spain	

== See also ==
- Billboard Latin Music Lifetime Achievement Award
- Latin Grammy Lifetime Achievement Award
- List of lifetime achievement awards
