= List of Billboard Regional Mexican Albums number ones of 1991 =

The Regional Mexican Albums, published in Billboard magazine, is a record chart that features Latin music sales information for regional styles of Mexican music. This data are compiled by Nielsen SoundScan from a sample that includes music stores, music departments at department stores and verifiable sales from concert venues in the United States.

== Albums ==
Issue date	Album	Artist	Reference
January 5	Amigo	Bronco	
January 12	Amigo	Bronco	
January 19	Mexico Voz y Sentimiento	Various Artists	
January 26	Mexico Voz y Sentimiento	Various Artists	
February 2	Mexico Voz y Sentimiento	Various Artists	
February 9	Mexico Voz y Sentimiento	Various Artists	
February 16	Mexico Voz y Sentimiento	Various Artists	
February 23	Mexico Voz y Sentimiento	Various Artists	
March 2	Mexico Voz y Sentimiento	Various Artists	
March 9	Mexico Voz y Sentimiento	Various Artists	
March 16	Mexico Voz y Sentimiento	Various Artists	
March 23	Mexico Voz y Sentimiento	Various Artists	
March 30	Mexico Voz y Sentimiento	Various Artists	
April 6	Mexico Voz y Sentimiento	Various Artists	
April 13	Mexico Voz y Sentimiento	Various Artists	
April 20	Para Nuestra Gente	Mazz	
April 27	Para Nuestra Gente	Mazz	
May 4	Para Nuestra Gente	Mazz	
May 11	Para Nuestra Gente	Mazz	
May 18	Amigo	Bronco	
May 25	Amigo	Bronco	
June 1	Amigo	Bronco	
June 8	Amigo	Bronco	
June 15	Amigo	Bronco	
June 22	Amigo	Bronco	
June 29	Amigo	Bronco	
July 6	Amigo	Bronco	
July 13	Porque Te Quiero	La Sombra	
July 20	Porque Te Quiero	La Sombra	
July 27	Porque Te Quiero	La Sombra	
August 3	Porque Te Quiero	La Sombra	
August 10	Porque Te Quiero	La Sombra	
August 17	Porque Te Quiero	La Sombra	
August 24	Para Nuestra Gente	Mazz	
August 31	Para Nuestra Gente	Mazz	
September 7	Arriba el Norte y Arriba el Sur	Ramón Ayala/Vicente Fernández	
September 14	Arriba el Norte y Arriba el Sur	Ramón Ayala/Vicente Fernández	
September 21	Arriba el Norte y Arriba el Sur	Ramón Ayala/Vicente Fernández	
September 28	Arriba el Norte y Arriba el Sur	Ramón Ayala/Vicente Fernández	
October 5	Arriba el Norte y Arriba el Sur	Ramón Ayala/Vicente Fernández	
October 12	Arriba el Norte y Arriba el Sur	Ramón Ayala/Vicente Fernández	
October 19	Mi México	Ana Gabriel	
October 26	Mi México	Ana Gabriel	
November 2	Mi México	Ana Gabriel	
November 9	Mi México	Ana Gabriel	
November 16	Mi México	Ana Gabriel	
November 23	Mi México	Ana Gabriel	
November 30	Mi México	Ana Gabriel	
December 7	Mazz Live-Una Noche Juntos	Mazz	
December 14	Mazz Live-Una Noche Juntos	Mazz	
December 21	Mazz Live-Una Noche Juntos	Mazz	
December 28	Mazz Live-Una Noche Juntos	Mazz	
