= Lo Nuestro Award for Regional Mexican Album of the Year =

Latin music award

Lo Nuestro Awards for Regional Mexican Album of the Year
- Current: Premio Lo Nuestro 2017
- Awarded for: Regional Mexican Album of the Year
- Country: United States
- Presented by: Univision
- First award: 1989
- Currently held by: Calibre 50, Mitad y Mitad (2019)

Highlights
- Most awards: Intocable (5)
- Most nominations: Los Tigres del Norte (14)
- Website: univision.com/premiolonuestro

The Lo Nuestro Award for Regional Mexican Album of the Year is an award presented annually by American network Univision. It was first awarded in 1989 and has been given annually since. The accolade was established to recognize the most talented performers of Latin music. The nominees and winners were originally selected by a voting poll conducted among program directors of Spanish-language radio stations in the United States and also based on chart performance on Billboard Latin music charts, with the results being tabulated and certified by the accounting firm Deloitte. At the present time, the winners are selected by the audience through an online survey. The trophy awarded is shaped in the form of a treble clef.

The award was first presented to Si Me Recuerdas by Mexican group Los Bukis. Mexican-American band Intocable holds the record for the most awards, winning on five occasions. Tejano acts Selena and La Mafia, Mexican bands Banda el Recodo, Bronco, Conjunto Primavera, and singer-songwriters Pepe Aguilar and Juan Gabriel, won the award twice each.

== Winners and nominees ==
Listed below are the winners of the award for each year, as well as the other nominees for the majority of the years awarded.

Key	Meaning
‡	Indicates the winning album

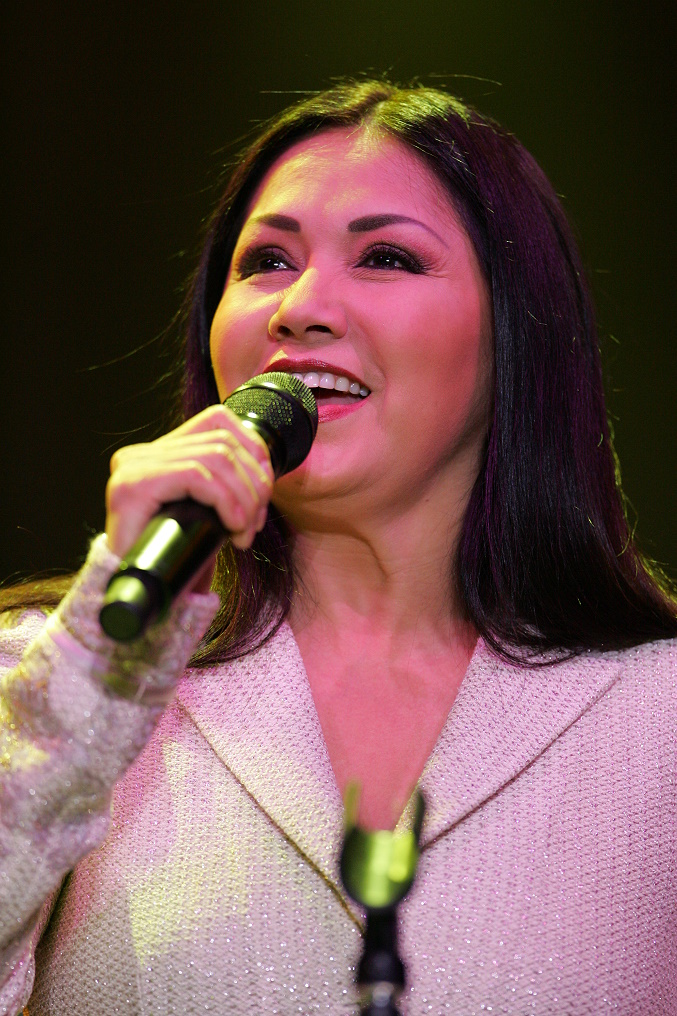
Mexican singer Ana Gabriel (pictured in 2006), winner in 1992

American performer Oscar de la Rosa, lead singer of La Mafia (pictured in 2008), winners in 1993 and 1994

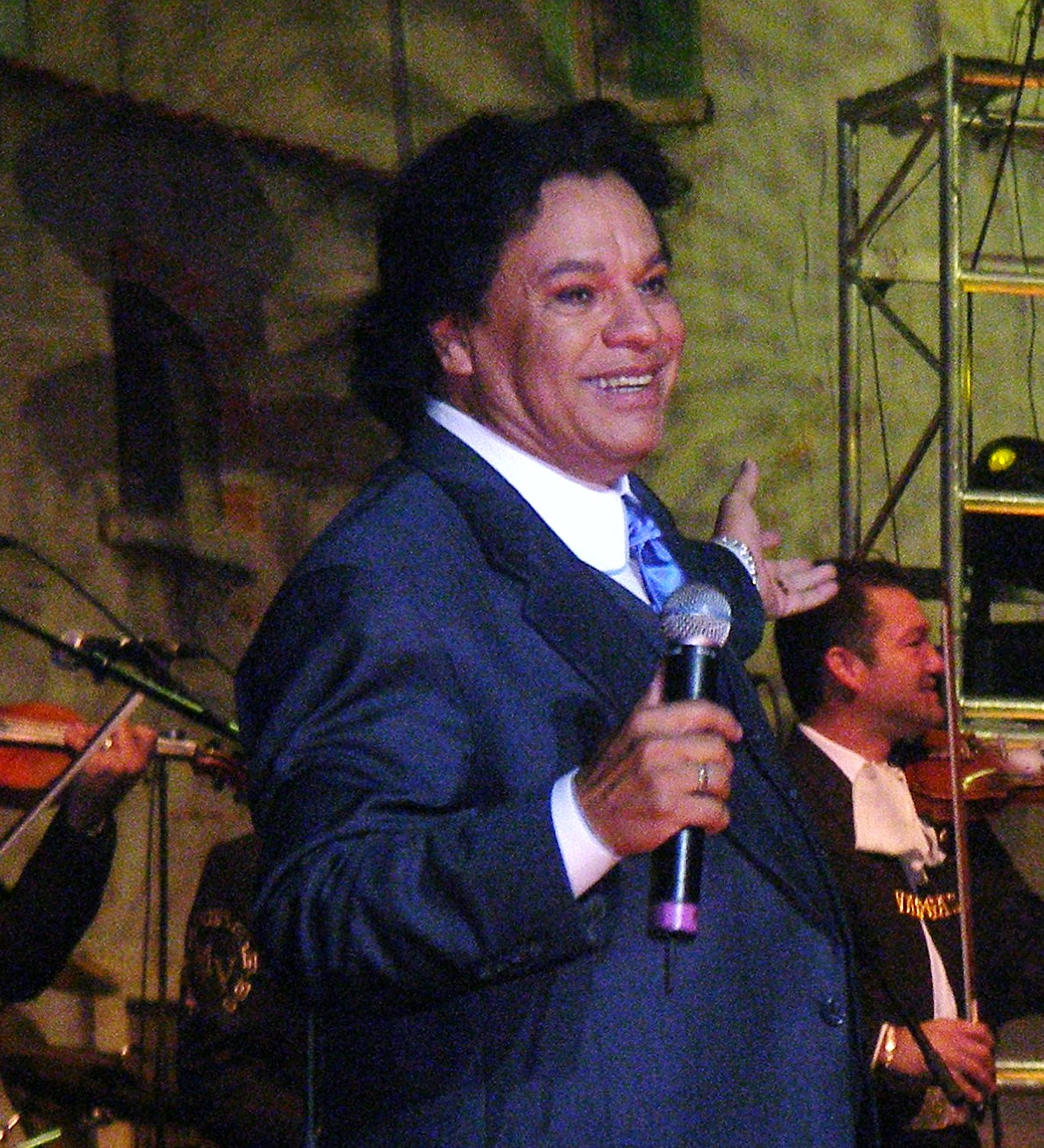
Mexican singer Juan Gabriel (pictured in 2006), winner in 1996 and 1998

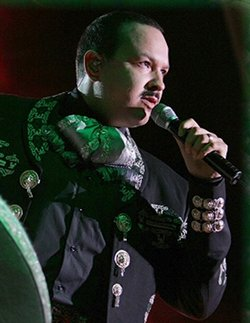
Mexican performer Pepe Aguilar (pictured in 2010), winner in 1999 and 2000

Year	Album	Performer(s)	Ref
1989 (1st)	Si Me Recuerdas‡	Los Bukis	
1989 (1st)	Superbronco	Bronco	
1989 (1st)	El Cuatrero	Vicente Fernández	
1989 (1st)	Canciones de Mi Padre	Linda Ronstadt	
1989 (1st)	Idolos del Pueblo	Los Tigres del Norte	
1990 (2nd)	Un Golpe Más‡	Bronco	
1990 (2nd)	Por Tu Maldita Amor	Vicente Fernández	
1990 (2nd)	Explosivo	La Mafia	
1990 (2nd)	Los Corridos Prohibidos	Los Tigres del Norte	
1990 (2nd)	Siempre Te Amaré	Los Yonics	
1991 (3rd)	A Todo Galope‡	Bronco	
1991 (3rd)	De Lo Nuevo, De Lo Mejor	Los Temerarios	
1991 (3rd)	Enter the Future	La Mafia	
1991 (3rd)	Mi Buena Suerte	Los Tigres del Norte	
1991 (3rd)	No Te Olvidaré	Mazz	
1992 (4th)	Mi México‡	Ana Gabriel	
1992 (4th)	Amigo	Bronco	
1992 (4th)	Arriba el Norte y Arriba el Sur	Vicente Fernández and Ramón Ayala	
1992 (4th)	Para Nuestra Gente	Mazz	
1992 (4th)	México, Voz y Sentimiento	Various Artists	
1993 (5th)	Estás Tocando Fuego‡	La Mafia	
1993 (5th)	Entre a Mi Mundo‡	Selena	
1993 (5th)	Alejandro Fernández	Alejandro Fernández	
1993 (5th)	Mi Vida Eres Tú	Los Temerarios	
1993 (5th)	Qué de Raro Tiene	Vicente Fernández	
1994 (6th)	Ahora y Siempre‡	La Mafia	
1994 (6th)	Con Sangre de Indio	Banda Machos	
1994 (6th)	Por el Mundo	Bronco	
1994 (6th)	Lo Haré Por Ti	Mazz	
1994 (6th)	Selena Live!	Selena	
1995 (7th)	Amor Prohibido‡	Selena	
1995 (7th)	Ayer y Hoy	Ana Gabriel	
1995 (7th)	Lástima Que Seas Ajena	Vicente Fernández	
1995 (7th)	Los Dos Plebes	Los Tigres del Norte	
1995 (7th)	Pura Sangre	Bronco	
1996 (8th)	El México Que Se Nos Fue‡	Juan Gabriel	
1996 (8th)	Aunque Me Duela el Alma	Vicente Fernández	
1996 (8th)	Joyas de Dos Siglos	Ana Gabriel	
1996 (8th)	Mi Forma de Sentir	Pedro Fernández	
1996 (8th)	Rompiendo Barreras	Bronco	
1997 (9th)	Unidos Para Siempre‡	Los Tigres del Norte	
1997 (9th)	Ay Amor	Ana Bárbara	
1997 (9th)	Juntos Para Siempre	Los Mismos	
1997 (9th)	Pedro Fernández	Pedro Fernández	
1997 (9th)	Un Millón de Rosas	La Mafia	
1998 (10th)	Juntos Otra Vez‡	Juan Gabriel and Rocío Dúrcal	
1998 (10th)	Con Un Mismo Corazón	Ana Gabriel	
1998 (10th)	Jefe de Jefes	Los Tigres del Norte	
1998 (10th)	Muy Dentro de Mi Corazón	Alejandro Fernández	
1998 (10th)	Partiéndome el Alma	Límite	
1999 (11th)	Por Mujeres Como Tu‡	Pepe Aguilar	
1999 (11th)	Así Como Tú	Los Tigres del Norte	
1999 (11th)	Amor Platónico	Los Tucanes de Tijuana	
1999 (11th)	Como Te Recuerdo	Los Temerarios	
1999 (11th)	De Corazón a Corazón	Límite	
2000 (12th)	Por Una Mujer Bonita‡	Pepe Aguilar	
2000 (12th)	12 Balazos de Plata	Priscila y sus Balas de Plata	
2000 (12th)	A Todas Las Que Amé	Ezequiel Peña	
2000 (12th)	Al Por Mayor	Los Tucanes de Tijuana	
2000 (12th)	Contigo	Intocable	
2000 (12th)	Herencia de Familia	Los Tigres del Norte	
2000 (12th)	Trozos de Mi Alma	Marco Antonio Solís	
2001 (13th)	Secreto de Amor‡	Joan Sebastian	
2001 (13th)	A Ellas	El Poder del Norte	
2001 (13th)	De Paisano a Paisano	Los Tigres del Norte	
2001 (13th)	El Recado	Conjunto Primavera	
2001 (13th)	Lobo Herido	Vicente Fernández	
2002 (14th)	Despreciado ‡	Lupillo Rivera	
2002 (14th)	Ansia de Amar	Conjunto Primavera	
2002 (14th)	Contigo Por Siempre	Banda el Recodo	
2002 (14th)	En Vivo	Joan Sebastian	
2002 (14th)	Lo Mejor de Nosotros	Pepe Aguilar	
2003 (15th)	Perdóname Mi Amor‡	Conjunto Primavera	
2003 (15th)	Ahora y Siempre	Liberación	
2003 (15th)	Amorcito Corazón	Lupillo Rivera	
2003 (15th)	Jugo a la Vida	Los Tucanes de Tijuana	
2003 (15th)	Sueños	Intocable	
2004 (16th)	Tu Amor o Tu Desprecio‡	Marco Antonio Solís	
2004 (16th)	Afortunado	Joan Sebastian	
2004 (16th)	Imperio	Los Tucanes de Tijuana	
2004 (16th)	Situaciones	Palomo	
2004 (16th)	Soy Así	Límite	
2005 (17th)	Intimamente‡	Intocable	
2005 (17th)	Locos de Amor	Los Horóscopos de Durango	
2005 (17th)	Pacto de Sangre	Los Tigres del Norte	
2005 (17th)	Por Ti	Banda el Recodo	
2005 (17th)	Que Amarren de Cupido	Joan Sebastian	
2006 (18th)	X‡	Intocable	
2006 (18th)	Directo al Corazón	Los Tigres del Norte	
2006 (18th)	Hoy Como Ayer	Conjunto Primavera	
2006 (18th)	Pensando En Ti	K-Paz de la Sierra	
2006 (18th)	Razón de Sobra	Marco Antonio Solís	
2007 (19th)	Algo de Mi‡	Conjunto Primavera	
2007 (19th)	Aliado del Tiempo	Mariano Barba	
2007 (19th)	Borrón y Cuenta Nueva	Grupo Montéz de Durango	
2007 (19th)	Historias Que Contar	Los Tigres del Norte	
2007 (19th)	Los Super Éxitos	Grupo Montéz de Durango	
2008 (20th)	Crossroads: Cruce de Caminos‡	Intocable	
2008 (20th)	Ahora y Siempre	Alacranes Musical	
2008 (20th)	Detalles y Emociones	Los Tigres del Norte	
2008 (20th)	El Amor Que Nunca Fue	Conjunto Primavera	
2008 (20th)	Recio, Recio Mis Creadorez	Los Creadorez del Pasito Duranguense de Alfredo Ramírez	
2009 (21st)	Capaz de Todo Por Ti‡	K-Paz de la Sierra	
2009 (21st)	Con Banda	Los Dareyes de la Sierra	
2009 (21st)	La Historia	El Chapo de Sinaloa	
2009 (21st)	Que Bonito... Es Lo Bonito	Banda el Recodo	
2009 (21st)	Y Que Quede Claro	La Arrolladora Banda El Limón	
2010 (22nd)	Te Presumo‡	Banda el Recodo	
2010 (22nd)	Más Adelante	La Arrolladora Banda El Limón	
2010 (22nd)	Nosotros Somos	Grupo Montéz de Durango	
2010 (22nd)	Para Siempre	El Chapo de Sinaloa	
2010 (22nd)	Sólo Contigo	Pesado	
2011 (23rd)	Me Gusta Todo de Ti‡	Banda el Recodo	
2011 (23rd)	¡Ando Bien Pedo!	Banda Los Recoditos	
2011 (23rd)	Classic	Intocable	
2011 (23rd)	En Preparación	Banda Sinaloense MS de Sergio Lizárraga	
2011 (23rd)	Soy Su Maestro (45 Aniversario)	La Original Banda El Limón	
2012 (24th)	Intocable 2011‡	Intocable	
2012 (24th)	Con la Mente en Blanco	Voz de Mando	
2012 (24th)	Gracias a Dios	Violento	
2012 (24th)	Huevos Rancheros	Joan Sebastian	
2012 (24th)	Pistear, Pistear	Chuy Lizarraga y su Banda Tierra Sinaloense	
2013 (25th)	Inténtalo‡	3BallMTY	
2013 (25th)	Irreversible... 2012	La Arrolladora Banda el Limón de René Camacho	
2013 (25th)	La Mejor de Todas	Banda el Recodo	
2013 (25th)	Márchate y Olvídame	Julión Álvarez	
2013 (25th)	Nada Iguales	La Addictiva Banda San José de Mesillas	
2014 (26th)	En Peligro de Extinción	Intocable	
2014 (26th)	La Estructura	Noel Torres	
2014 (26th)	Mi Razón de Ser	Banda Sinaloense MS de Sergio Lizárraga	
2014 (26th)	Tu Amigo Nada Más	Julión Álvarez	
2014 (26th)	Y Ahora Resulta	Voz de Mando	
2015 (27th)	Archivos de Mi Vida	Gerardo Ortíz	
2015 (27th)	Cazador	El Komander	
2015 (27th)	La Balanza	Noel Torres	
2015 (27th)	Haciendo Historia	Banda El Recodo de Cruz Lizárraga	
2015 (27th)	Soy Lo Que Quiero... Indispensable	Julión Álvarez	
2016 (28th)	Quiero Ser Tu Dueño	Luis Coronel	
2016 (28th)	Sueño XXX	Banda Los Recoditos	
2016 (28th)	El Karma	Ariel Camacho y los Plebes del Rancho	
2016 (28th)	Realidades	Los Tigres del Norte	
2016 (28th)	Levantando Polvareda	Voz de Mando	
2017 (29th)	Qué Bendición	Banda Sinaloense MS de Sergio Lizárraga	
2017 (29th)	Hombre de Trabajo	Banda Carnaval	
2017 (29th)	Me Está Gustando	Banda Los Recoditos	
2017 (29th)	Historias de la Calle	Calibre 50	
2017 (29th)	Levantando Polvareda	Remmy Valenzuela	
2019 (31st)	Mitad y Mitad	Calibre 50	
2019 (31st)	Calidad y Cantidad	La Arrolladora Banda el Limón de René Camacho	
2019 (31st)	El Elegido	Ulices Chaidez y Sus Plebes	
2019 (31st)	Me Traes de un Ala	Grupo Laberinto	
2019 (31st)	Mi Vida Eres Tú	Virlán García	

== See also ==
- Grammy Award for Best Banda Album
- Grammy Award for Best Mexican/Mexican-American Album
- Grammy Award for Best Norteño Album
- Latin Grammy Award for Best Banda Album
- Latin Grammy Award for Best Norteño Album
