= Lo Nuestro Award for Pop Group or Duo of the Year =

Latin music award

Lo Nuestro Awards for Pop Group or Duo of the Year
- Awarded for: Pop Group or Duo of the Year
- Country: United States
- Presented by: Univision
- First award: 1989
- Currently held by: RBD (2024)

Highlights
- Most awards: CNCO (6)
- Website: univision.com/premiolonuestro

The Lo Nuestro Award for Pop Group or Duo of the Year is an award presented annually by American network Univision. It was first awarded in 1989 and has been given annually since. The accolade was established to recognize the most talented performers of Latin music. The nominees and winners were originally selected by a voting poll conducted among program directors of Spanish-language radio stations in the United States and also based on chart performance on Billboard Latin music charts, with the results being tabulated and certified by the accounting firm Deloitte. At the present time, the winners are selected by the audience through an online survey. The trophy awarded is shaped in the form of a treble clef.

The award was first presented to Cuban-American band Gloria Estefan and Miami Sound Machine. Mexican group Camila holds the record for the most awards, winning on five occasions out of seven nominations. Mexican duo Sin Bandera, group Los Bukis (once as Marco Antonio Solís and Los Bukis), and rock band Maná, won in three ceremonies each. Only two duets have won the award: Juan Gabriel and Rocío Dúrcal in 1998 and Shakira and Alejandro Sanz in 2006. In 2019, American ensemble CNCO became the most recent recipients of the award.

== Winners and nominees ==
Listed below are the winners of the award for each year, as well as the other nominees for the majority of the years awarded.

Key	Meaning
‡	Indicates the winner

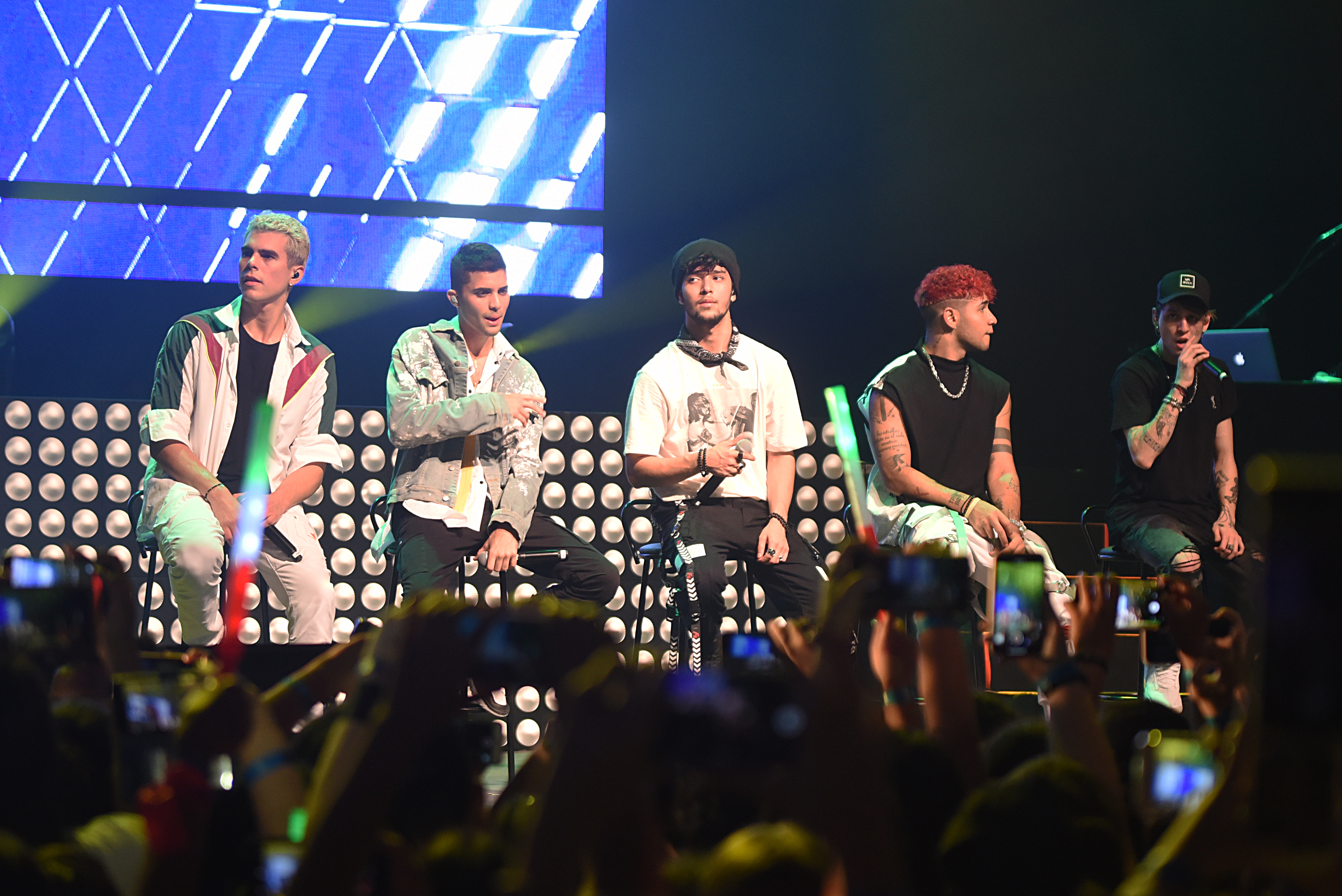
The CNCO group is the biggest winner in the category, with six awards

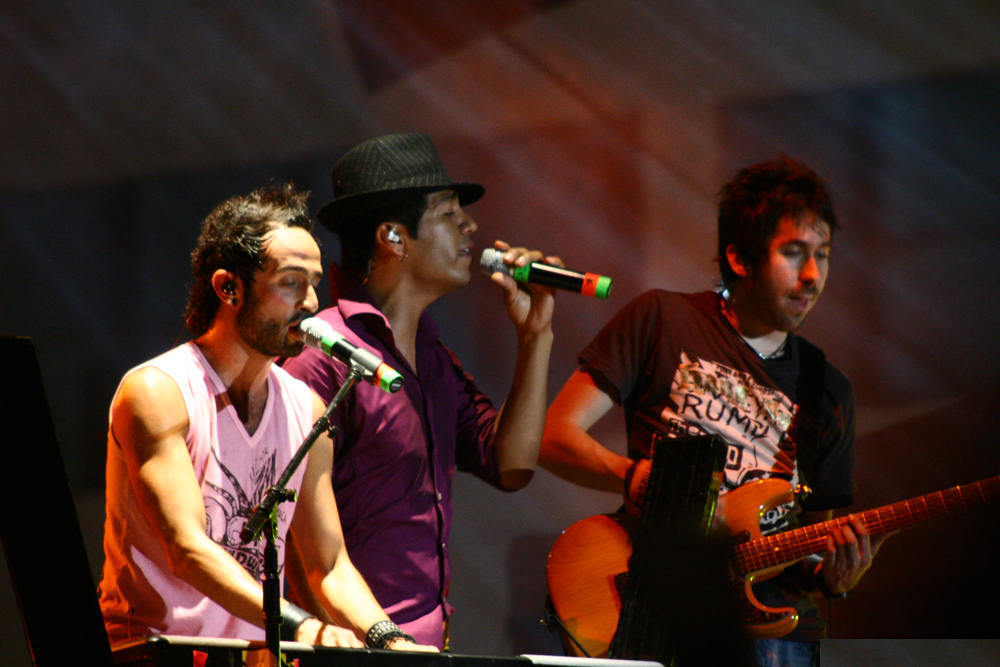
Mexican group Camila won five times

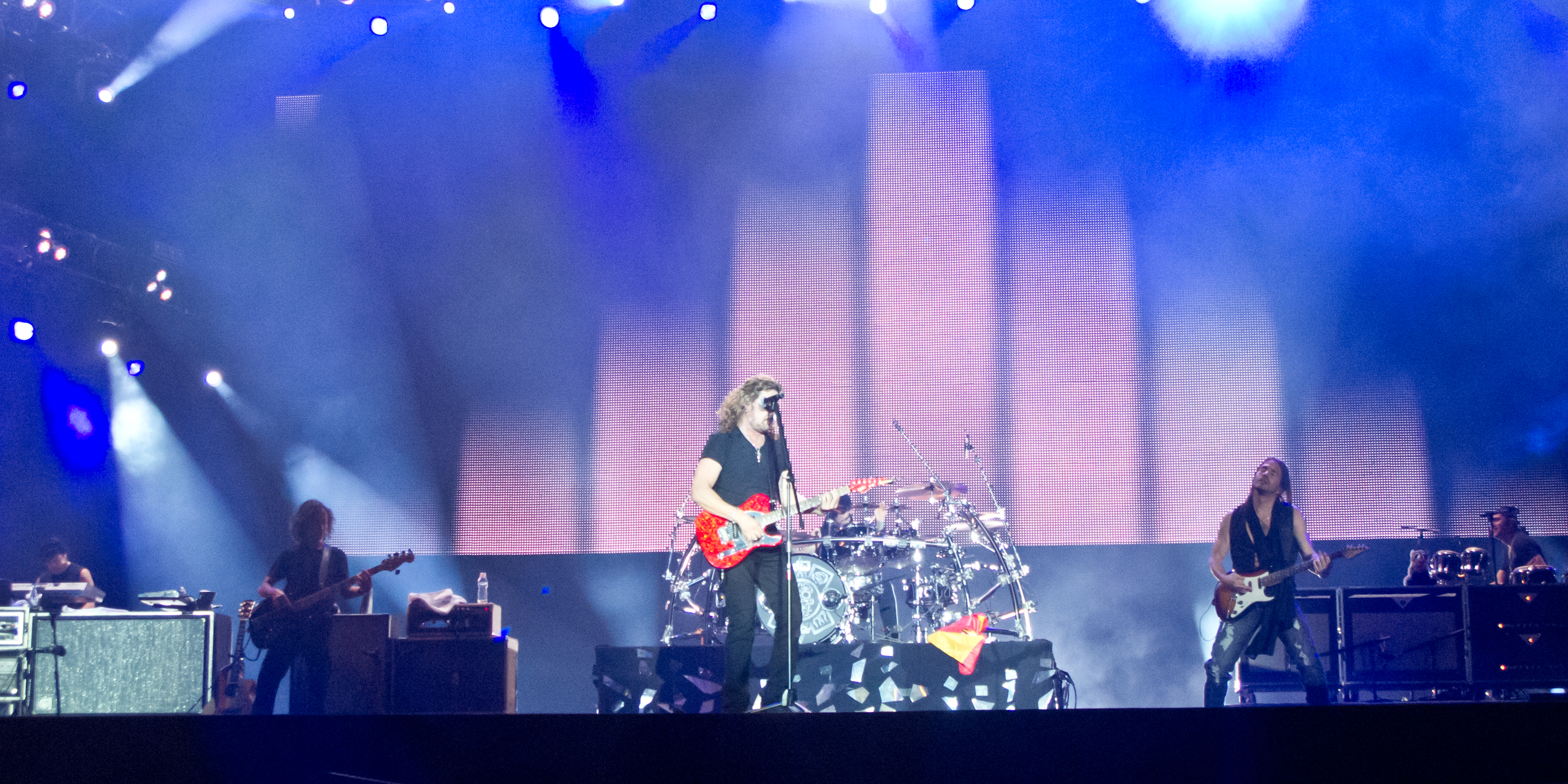
Three-time winners, Mexican band Maná

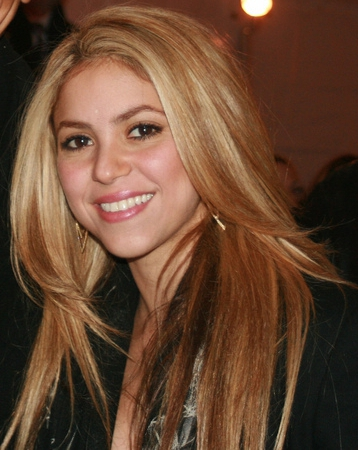
Colombian performer Shakira (pictured in 2009), winner in 2006 for her duet with Alejandro Sanz

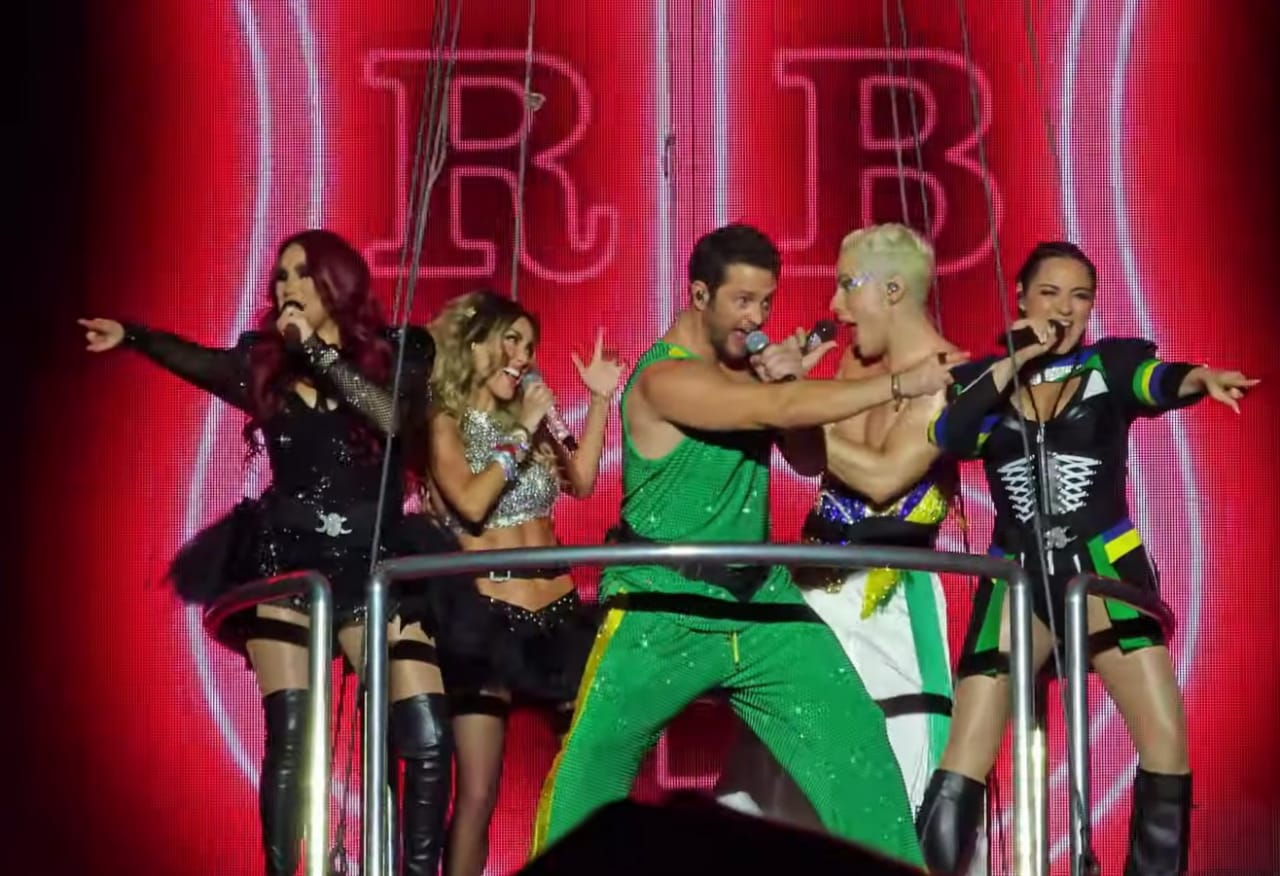
The Mexican group RBD won twice: the first in 2007 and the second in 2024

Year	Performer	Ref
1989 (1st)	Gloria Estefan and Miami Sound Machine‡	
1989 (1st)	Eydie Gormé and Roberto Carlos	
1989 (1st)	Los Bukis	
1989 (1st)	Joan Sebastian and Alberto Vázquez	
1990 (2nd)	Kaoma‡	
1990 (2nd)	Los Bukis	
1990 (2nd)	Gipsy Kings	
1990 (2nd)	Pandora	
1991 (3rd)	Los Bukis‡	
1991 (3rd)	Azúcar Moreno	
1991 (3rd)	Kaoma	
1991 (3rd)	Pandora	
1992 (4th)	Pandora‡	
1992 (4th)	Azúcar Moreno	
1992 (4th)	Los Bukis	
1992 (4th)	Gipsy Kings	
1993 (5th)	Pandora‡	
1993 (5th)	Los Bukis	
1993 (5th)	H2O	
1993 (5th)	Magneto	
1994 (6th)	Los Bukis‡	
1994 (6th)	Pandora	
1994 (6th)	Barrio Boyzz	
1994 (6th)	Los Fantasmas del Caribe	
1995 (7th)	La Mafia‡	
1995 (7th)	Los Bukis	
1995 (7th)	Maná	
1995 (7th)	Sparx	
1996 (8th)	Marco Antonio Solís and Los Bukis‡	
1996 (8th)	Barrio Boyzz	
1996 (8th)	Bronco	
1996 (8th)	Donato y Estéfano	
1997 (9th)	Maná‡	
1997 (9th)	Barrio Boyzz	
1997 (9th)	Donato y Estéfano	
1997 (9th)	Mestizzo	
1998 (10th)	Juan Gabriel and Rocío Dúrcal‡	
1998 (10th)	Alejandro Fernández and Gloria Estefan	
1998 (10th)	Maná	
1998 (10th)	Pandora	
1999 (11th)	Maná‡	
1999 (11th)	Andrea Bocelli and Marta Sánchez	
1999 (11th)	Olga Tañón and Cristian Castro	
1999 (11th)	Sentidos Opuestos	
2000 (12th)	Maná‡	
2000 (12th)	Los Trí-O	
2000 (12th)	El Símbolo	
2001 (13th)	Son by Four‡	
2001 (13th)	Azul Azul	
2001 (13th)	MDO	
2001 (13th)	OV7	
2002 (14th)	OV7‡	
2002 (14th)	MDO	
2002 (14th)	Nydia Rojas and Juan Gabriel	
2002 (14th)	Son by Four	
2003 (15th)	Sin Bandera‡	
2003 (15th)	Kabah	
2003 (15th)	Las Ketchup	
2003 (15th)	OV7	
2004 (16th)	Sin Bandera‡	
2004 (16th)	Juanes and Nelly Furtado	
2004 (16th)	La Oreja de Van Gogh	
2004 (16th)	Maná	
2005 (17th)	Sin Bandera‡	
2005 (17th)	Andy & Lucas	
2005 (17th)	La Oreja de Van Gogh	
2005 (17th)	Aleks Syntek and Ana Torroja	
2006 (18th)	Shakira and Alejandro Sanz‡	
2006 (18th)	Kumbia Kings	
2006 (18th)	La 5ª Estación	
2006 (18th)	Aleks Syntek and Ana Torroja	
2007 (19th)	RBD‡	
2007 (19th)	La 5ª Estación	
2007 (19th)	Reik	
2007 (19th)	Sin Bandera	
2008 (20th)	Camila‡	
2008 (20th)	La 5ª Estación	
2008 (20th)	RBD	
2008 (20th)	Reik	
2009 (21st)	Camila‡	
2009 (21st)	Belanova	
2009 (21st)	Jesse & Joy	
2009 (21st)	RBD	
2009 (21st)	Reik	
2010 (22nd)	La 5ª Estación‡	
2010 (22nd)	Jesse & Joy	
2010 (22nd)	Los Temerarios	
2010 (22nd)	Playa Limbo	
2010 (22nd)	Reik	
2011 (23rd)	Camila‡	
2011 (23rd)	Jesse & Joy	
2011 (23rd)	La 5ª Estación	
2011 (23rd)	Playa Limbo	
2011 (23rd)	Tercer Cielo	
2012 (24th)	Camila‡	
2012 (24th)	Alex, Jorge y Lena	
2012 (24th)	Belanova	
2012 (24th)	Reik	
2013 (25th)	Jesse & Joy‡	
2013 (25th)	Camila	
2013 (25th)	Da'Zoo	
2013 (25th)	Reik	
2014 (26th)	Jesse & Joy‡	
2014 (26th)	Da'Zoo	
2014 (26th)	Maná	
2014 (26th)	Marconi	
2014 (26th)	Reik	
2015 (27th)	Camila‡	
2015 (27th)	3Ball MTY	
2015 (27th)	Jesse & Joy	
2015 (27th)	La Ley	
2015 (27th)	Río Roma	
2016 (28th)	Jesse & Joy‡	
2016 (28th)	Camila	
2016 (28th)	Ha*Ash	
2016 (28th)	Maná	
2017 (29th)	CNCO‡	
2017 (29th)	Jesse & Joy	
2017 (29th)	Maná	
2017 (29th)	Reik	
2019 (31st)	CNCO‡	
2019 (31st)	Mau y Ricky	
2019 (31st)	Piso 21	
2019 (31st)	Reik	
2020 (32nd)	CNCO‡	
2020 (32nd)	Jesse & Joy	
2020 (32nd)	Maná	
2020 (32nd)	Piso 21	
2020 (32nd)	Reik	
2021 (33rd)	CNCO‡	
2021 (33rd)	Cali y El Dandee	
2021 (33rd)	Jesse & Joy	
2021 (33rd)	Mau y Ricky	
2021 (33rd)	Reik	
2022 (34th)	CNCO‡	
2022 (34th)	Mau y Ricky	
2022 (34th)	Morat	
2022 (34th)	Piso 21	
2022 (34th)	Reik	
2023 (34th)	CNCO‡	
2023 (34th)	Ha*Ash	
2023 (34th)	Jesse & Joy	
2023 (34th)	Maná	
2023 (34th)	Matisse	
2023 (34th)	Mau y Ricky	
2023 (34th)	Morat	
2023 (34th)	Piso 21	
2023 (34th)	Reik	
2023 (34th)	Sin Bandera	
2024 (34th)	RBD‡	
2024 (34th)	Camila	
2024 (34th)	Ha*Ash	
2024 (34th)	Piso 21	
2024 (34th)	Reik	

== See also ==
- Grammy Award for Best Latin Pop Album
- Latin Grammy Award for Best Pop Album by a Duo or Group with Vocals
- Los Premios MTV Latinoamérica for Best Group or Duet
