= Sagitario =

Sagitario may refer to:

- Sagitario (album), Ana Gabriel
- Sagitário, in 2007 the first Portuguese warship with a female commander Centauro-class fiscalization boat
- Sagitario, 1920s Mexican anarcho-syndicalist newspaper edited by Librado Rivera
- Sagitario Films, producers of Four Women (1947 film) and other films
- Sagitario (film), 2001 film directed by Vicente Molina Foix, starring Ángela Molina and Eusebio Poncela, Julieta Serrano
- Makatea, island which was called "Sagitario" in 1606 by Pedro Fernandes de Queirós
