= Una Voz Para tu Corazón – 30 Grandes Éxitos =

Una Voz Para tu Corazón 30 Grandes Éxitos

Greatest hits album by Ana Gabriel
- Released: 21 November 2000 (Mexico)
- Recorded: 2000
- Genre: Pop
- Label: Sony International

Ana Gabriel Compilations chronology
| 3 CD Box Sony International (1999) | Una Voz Para tu Corazón; 30 Grandes Éxitos (2000) | Coleccion de Oro (2002) |

Una Voz Para tu Corazón – 30 Grandes Éxitos (English A voice for your heart-30 Greatest Hits) is a compilation album by the Mexican pop singer, Ana Gabriel.

== Track listing ==
=== Cd 1 ===
1. Simplemente amigos
2. Y aquí estoy
3. Es el amor quien llega
4. Ay amor
5. Destino
6. Pensar en ti
7. Mar y arena
8. No a perdón
9. Tú y yo
10. Evidencias
11. Ven, ven
12. Pecado original
13. Amor
14. Soledad
15. Hice bien quererte

=== Cd 2 ===
1. No te hago falta
2. Eres differente
3. Amor con desamor
4. Cosas del amor
5. Que poco hombre
6. Ni un roce
7. Llena de romance
8. En la oscuridad
9. Luna
10. Poquita fe
11. Esta noche
12. Quién como tú
13. A tu lado
14. Lo sé
15. Obsesión

== Album charts ==
| # | Chart | U.S. Peak Position |
|---|---|---|
| 1. | "Billboard Latin Pop Albums" | #15 |
| 2. | "Top Lat. Albums" | #31 |

- Note: This release reached the #15 position in Billboard Regional Mexican Albums staying for 1 week and it reached the #31 position in the Billboard Top Latin Albums staying for 5 weeks in the chart.
