= Premio Lo Nuestro 1995 =

Latin Music awards show

7th Lo Nuestro Awards
- Date: Thursday, May 18, 1995

Highlights
- Most awards: Selena (4)
- Most nominations: Juan Gabriel (5)

The 7th Lo Nuestro Awards ceremony, presented by the Univision, honored the best Latin music of 1994 and 1995 and took place on May 18, 1995, at a live presentation held in Miami, Florida. The ceremony was broadcast in the United States and Latin America by Univision.

During the ceremony, nineteen categories were presented. Winners were announced at the live event and included Tejano singer Selena receiving four posthumous awards, and Luis Miguel and Carlos Vives, each receiving two awards. Among its honors, Miguel won the award for "Pop Album of the Year," Selena for "Regional Mexican Album of the Year," and Olga Tañón for "Tropical/Salsa Album of the Year." Spanish singer Julio Iglesias received the Excellence Award.

== Background ==
In 1989, the Lo Nuestro Awards were established by Univision, to recognize the most talented performers of Latin music. The nominees were selected by Univision and the winners chosen by the public. The categories included are for the Pop, Tropical/Salsa, Regional Mexican and Rap genres, and Music Video. The trophy awarded is shaped like a treble clef. The 7th Lo Nuestro Award ceremony was held on May 18, 1995, in a live presentation broadcast in United States and Latin America by Univision.

== Winners and nominees ==
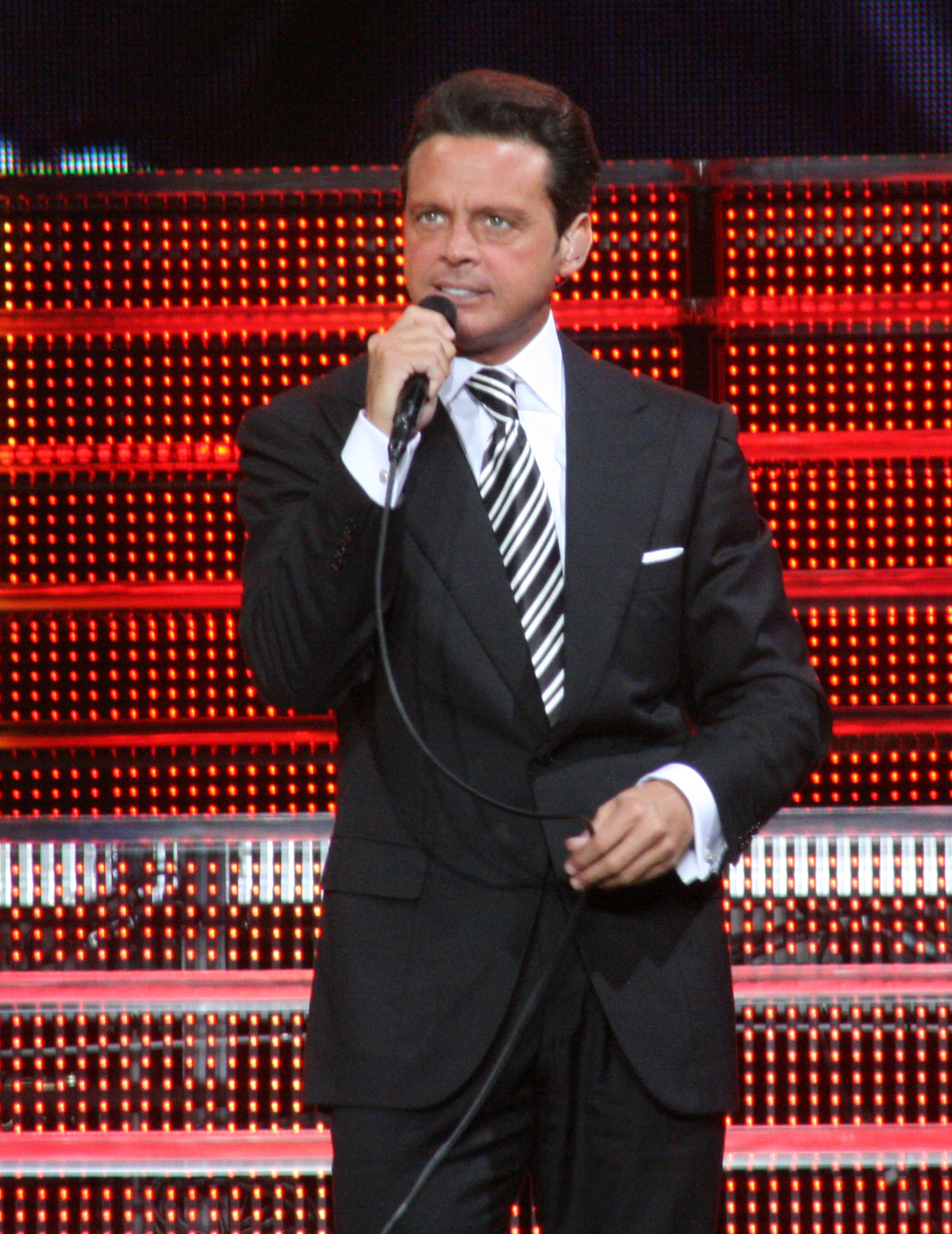
Mexican performer Luis Miguel (pictured in 2009), won the Lo Nuestro for Pop Album and Pop Male Artist of 1994

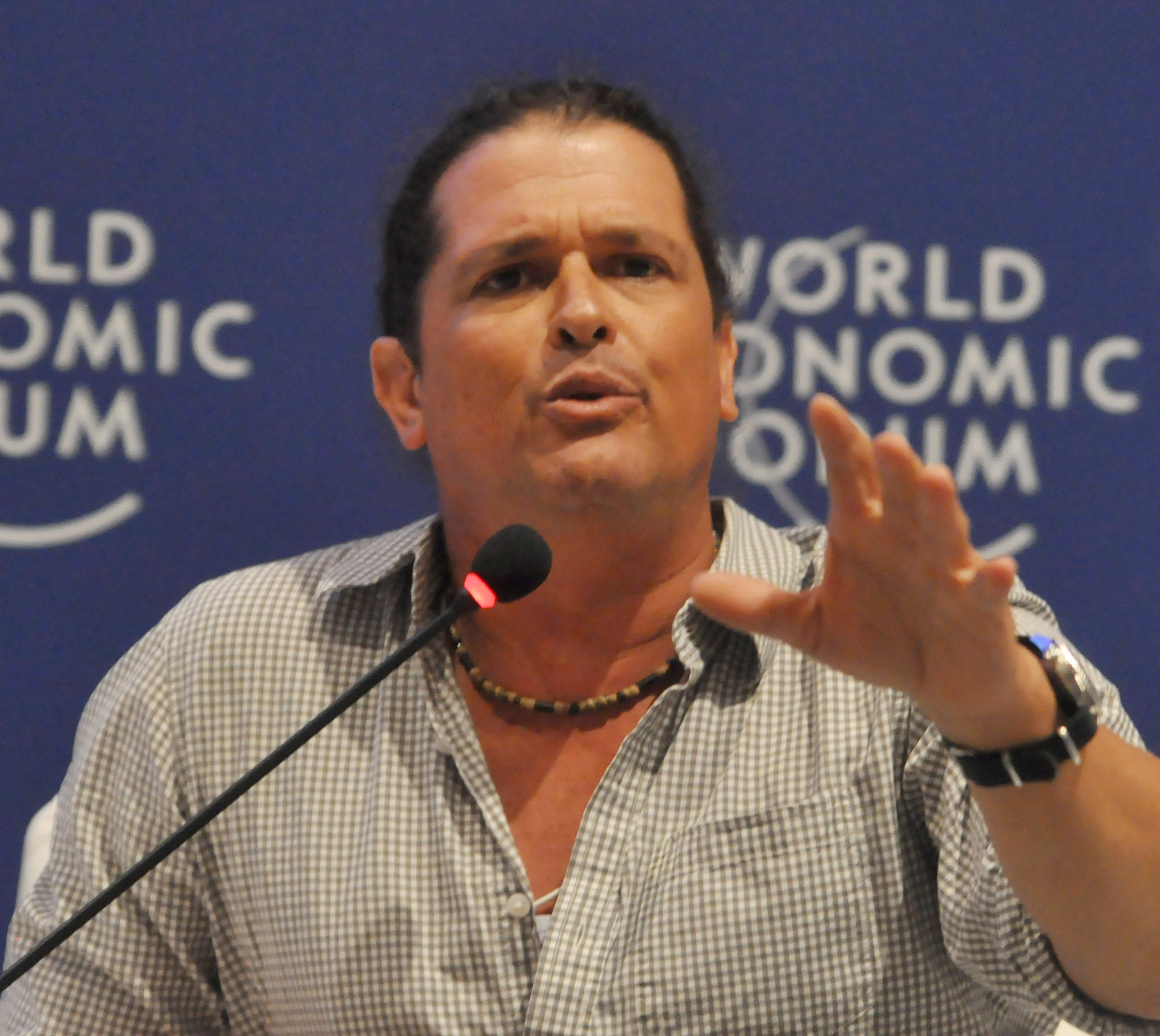
Colombian singer Carlos Vives (pictured in 2010), won three Lo Nuestro Awards in 1995

Winners were announced before the live audience during the ceremony. Mexican singer-songwriter Juan Gabriel was the most nominated performer, with five nominations, including Pop Album (Gracias Por Esperar), Male Artist, and Pop Song (for writing "Mañana", performed by Cristian Castro; "Luna", performed by Ana Gabriel; and "Pero Qué Necesidad", performed by Gabriel); the singer-songwriter received the Pop Song of the Year Award for his single "Pero Qué Necesidad". Mexican singer Luis Miguel was awarded for second year in row for Pop Album of the Year (Segundo Romance) and Pop Male Artist, and also won Video of the Year for "La Media Vuelta". Four of the songs nominated for Pop Song of the Year—Miguel's "El Día Que Me Quieras", "Luna" by Ana Gabriel, "Pero Que Necesidad" by Juan Gabriel, and La Mafia's "Vida"—reached number one at the Billboard Top Latin Songs chart. Tejano singer Selena dominated the Regional Mexican field winning all her nominations, including Album of the Year (Amor Prohibido), Regional Mexican Song ("Amor Prohibido") and Female Artist of the Year; Selena also won for Pop Female Artist. Puerto-Rican American artist Olga Tañón received two awards for Tropical/Salsa Album and Female Artist of the Year, while Colombian singer Carlos Vives was awarded for New Artist, Male Artist and Song of the Year for "La Gota Fría". Spanish singer Julio Iglesias earned the Excellence Award.

Winners and nominees of the 7th Annual Lo Nuestro Awards (winners listed first)
Pop Album of the Year	Pop Song of the Year
Luis Miguel – Segundo Romance; Cristian Castro – El Camino del Alma; Juan Gabriel – Gracias Por Esperar; La Mafia – Vida; Carlos Vives – Clásicos de la Provincia	Juan Gabriel – "Pero Qué Necesidad"; Cristian Castro – "Mañana"; Ana Gabriel – "Luna"; Luis Miguel – "El Día Que Me Quieras"; La Mafia – "Vida"
Male Artist of the Year, Pop	Female Artist of the Year, Pop
Luis Miguel; Ricardo Arjona; Cristian Castro; Juan Gabriel	Selena; Ana Gabriel; Gloria Estefan; Yuri
Pop Group of the Year	Pop New Artist of the Year
La Mafia; Los Bukis; Maná; Sparx	Laura Pausini; Kairo; Marcos Llunas; Marta Sánchez
Regional Mexican Album of the Year	Regional Mexican Song of the Year
Selena – Amor Prohibido; Bronco – Pura Sangre; Vicente Fernández – Lástima Que Seas Ajena; Ana Gabriel – Ayer y Hoy; Los Tigres del Norte – Los Dos Plebes	Selena – "Amor Prohibido"; Banda Zeta – "La Niña Fresa"; Liberación – "Ese Loco Soy Yo"; Los Fugitivos – "La Loca"; Marco Antonio Solís and Los Bukis – "Tu Ingratitud"
Male Artist of the Year, Regional Mexican	Female Artist of the Year, Regional Mexican
Alejandro Fernández; Pepe Aguilar; Vicente Fernández; Ezequiel Peña	Selena; Ana Bárbara; Ana Gabriel; Lucero
Regional Mexican Group of the Year	Regional Mexican New Artist of the Year
Marco Antonio Solís and Los Bukis; Los Fugitivos; Los Temerarios; Los Tigres del Norte	Ezequiel Peña; Ana Bárbara; Banda El Mexicano; La Diferenzia
Tropical/Salsa Album of the Year	Tropical/Salsa Song of the Year
Olga Tañón – Siente el Amor...; Juan Luis Guerra y 440 – Fogaraté; India – Dicen Que Soy; Jerry Rivera – Lo Nuevo y Lo Mejor; Rey Ruiz – Mi Media Mitad	Carlos Vives – "La Gota Fría"; Marc Anthony and India – "Vivir Lo Nuestro"; Jerry Rivera – "Día y Noche Pienso en Ella"; Rey Ruiz – "Mi Media Mitad"; Olga Tañón – "Presencié Tu Amor"
Male Artist of the Year, Tropical/Salsa	Female Artist of the Year, Tropical/Salsa
Carlos Vives; Rey Ruiz; Gilberto Santa Rosa; Jerry Rivera	Olga Tañón; Gloria Estefan; Celia Cruz; India
Tropical/Salsa Group of the Year	Tropical/Salsa New Artist of the Year
Grupo Niche; Juan Luis Guerra y 440; Pochy y su Cocoband; Los Toros Band	Giro; Albita; Wichy Camacho; Carlos Nuño
Video of the Year
Luis Miguel – "La Media Vuelta"; Juan Luis Guerra y 440 – "Viviré"; Luis Enrique – "Así Es La Vida"; Maná – "Te Lloré un Río"; Daniela Romo – "Qué Sabes Tú"; Jon Secada – "Si Te Vas"; Álvaro Torres and Barrio Boyzz – "Reencuentro"

== See also ==
- 1994 in Latin music
