= Lo Nuestro Award for Pop Female Artist of the Year =

Latin music award

Lo Nuestro Awards for Pop Female Artist of the Year
- Current: Premio Lo Nuestro 2017
- Awarded for: Pop Female Artist of the Year
- Country: United States
- Presented by: Univision
- First award: 1989
- Currently held by: Thalía (2017)

Highlights
- Most awards: Shakira (9)
- Website: univision.com/premiolonuestro

The Lo Nuestro Award for Pop Female Artist of the Year is an award presented annually by American television network Univision. It was first awarded in 1989 and has been given annually since. The accolade was established to recognize the most talented performers of Latin music. The nominees and winners were originally selected by a voting poll conducted among program directors of Spanish-language radio stations in the United States and also based on chart performance on Billboard Latin music charts, with the results being tabulated and certified by the accounting firm Deloitte. At the present time, the winners are selected by the audience through an online survey. The trophy awarded is shaped in the form of a treble clef.

The award was first presented to Spanish singer Isabel Pantoja. Colombian singer-songwriter Shakira is the most nominated performer and holds the record for the most awards, winning on nine occasions out of twelve nominations. Mexican singer-songwriter Ana Gabriel won in four consecutive ceremonies. Mexican-American singer Jenni Rivera, Cuban-American artist Gloria Estefan, Italian performer Laura Pausini and Mexican singers Thalía and Paulina Rubio have received two awards each. The current holder of the award is Mexican artist Thalía.

== Winners and nominees ==
Listed below are the winners of the award for each year, as well as the other nominees for the majority of the years awarded.

Key	Meaning
‡	Indicates the winner

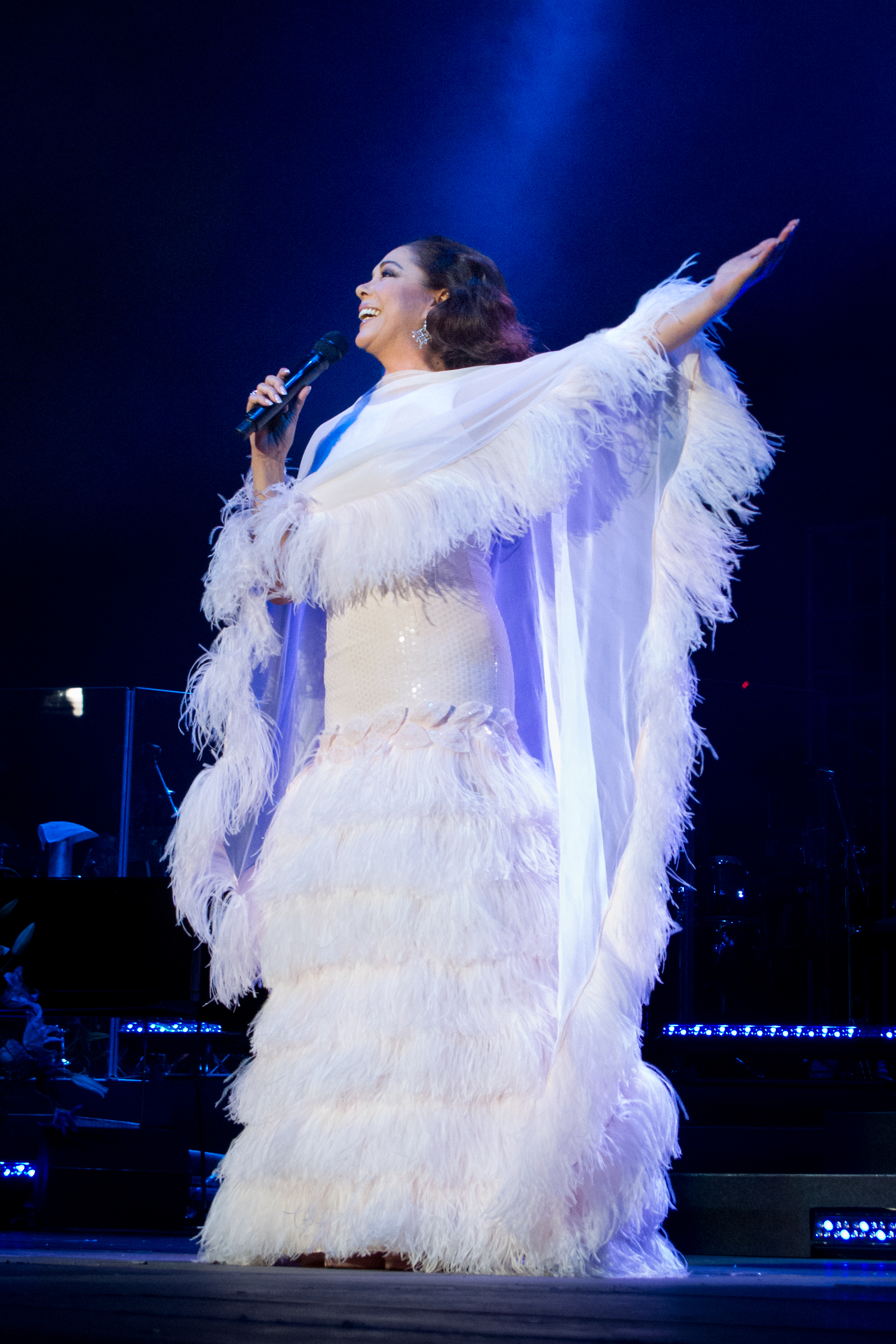
Spanish singer Isabel Pantoja (pictured in 2012), winner in 1989

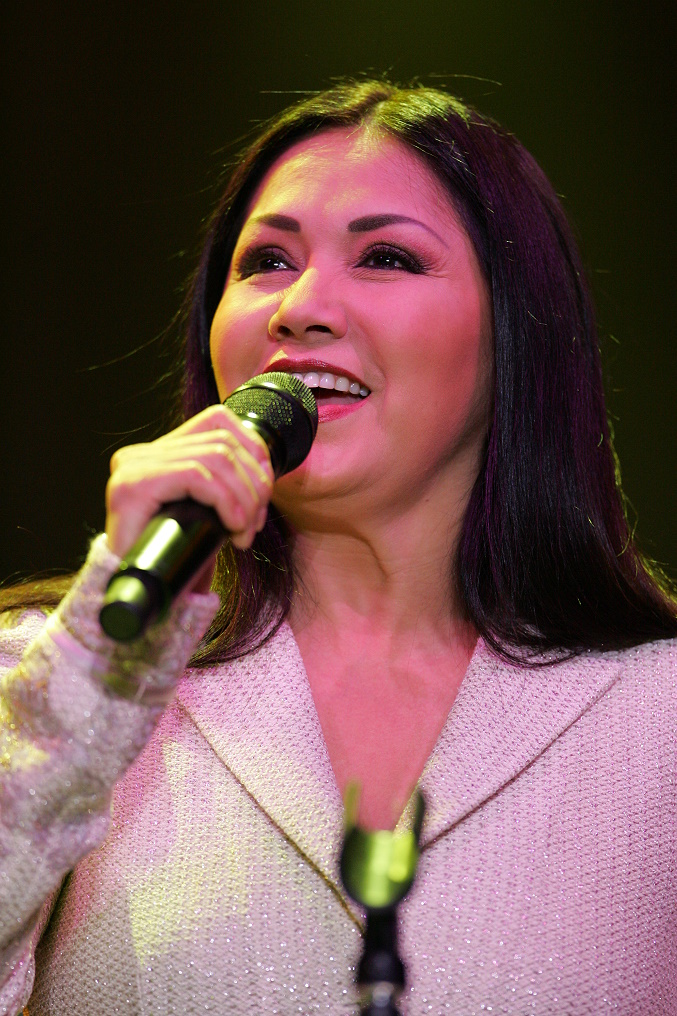
Mexican singer Ana Gabriel (pictured in 2006), winner for four years in a row (1990-1993)

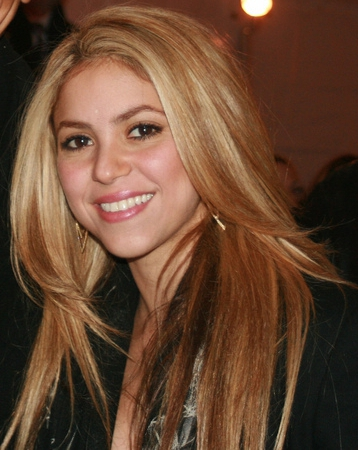
Colombian singer Shakira (pictured in 2009), the most awarded performer with nine wins

Year	Performer	Ref
1989 (1st)	Isabel Pantoja‡	
1989 (1st)	Ana Gabriel	
1989 (1st)	Yolandita Monge	
1989 (1st)	Yuri	
1990 (2nd)	Ana Gabriel‡	
1990 (2nd)	Rocío Dúrcal	
1990 (2nd)	Marisela	
1990 (2nd)	Isabel Pantoja	
1991 (3rd)	Ana Gabriel‡	
1991 (3rd)	Gloria Estefan	
1991 (3rd)	Myriam Hernández	
1991 (3rd)	Daniela Romo	
1992 (4th)	Ana Gabriel‡	
1992 (4th)	Vikki Carr	
1992 (4th)	Daniela Romo	
1992 (4th)	Gloria Trevi	
1993 (5th)	Ana Gabriel‡	
1993 (5th)	Daniela Romo	
1993 (5th)	Paulina Rubio	
1993 (5th)	Gloria Trevi	
1994 (6th)	Gloria Estefan‡	
1994 (6th)	Ana Gabriel	
1994 (6th)	Lucero	
1994 (6th)	Ednita Nazario	
1995 (7th)	Selena‡	
1995 (7th)	Gloria Estefan	
1995 (7th)	Ana Gabriel	
1995 (7th)	Yuri	
1996 (8th)	Gloria Estefan‡	
1996 (8th)	Rocío Dúrcal	
1996 (8th)	Lucero	
1996 (8th)	Thalía	
1997 (9th)	Shakira‡	
1997 (9th)	Laura Pausini	
1997 (9th)	Olga Tañón	
1997 (9th)	Thalía	
1998 (10th)	Thalía‡	
1998 (10th)	Rocío Dúrcal	
1998 (10th)	Laura Flores	
1998 (10th)	Lucero	
1999 (11th)	Shakira‡	
1999 (11th)	Gloria Estefan	
1999 (11th)	Fey	
1999 (11th)	Olga Tañón	
2000 (12th)	Shakira‡	
2000 (12th)	Jennifer Lopez	
2000 (12th)	Noelia	
2000 (12th)	Jaci Velasquez	
2001 (13th)	Christina Aguilera‡	
2001 (13th)	Paulina Rubio	
2001 (13th)	Shakira	
2001 (13th)	Jaci Velasquez	
2002 (14th)	Paulina Rubio‡	
2002 (14th)	Christina Aguilera	
2002 (14th)	Laura Pausini	
2002 (14th)	Jaci Velasquez	
2003 (15th)	Shakira‡	
2003 (15th)	Alejandra Guzmán	
2003 (15th)	Pilar Montenegro	
2003 (15th)	Jennifer Peña	
2003 (15th)	Laura Pausini	
2003 (15th)	Thalía	
2004 (16th)	Shakira‡	
2004 (16th)	Millie Corretjer	
2004 (16th)	Soraya	
2004 (16th)	Thalía	
2005 (17th)	Paulina Rubio‡	
2005 (17th)	Ednita Nazario	
2005 (17th)	Jennifer Peña	
2005 (17th)	Thalía	
2006 (18th)	Laura Pausini‡	
2006 (18th)	Jimena	
2006 (18th)	Julieta Venegas	
2006 (18th)	Paulina Rubio	
2007 (19th)	Shakira‡	
2007 (19th)	Anaís	
2007 (19th)	Laura Pausini	
2007 (19th)	Julieta Venegas	
2008 (20th)	Belinda‡	
2008 (20th)	Paulina Rubio	
2008 (20th)	Julieta Venegas	
2008 (20th)	Yuridia	
2009 (21st)	Gloria Trevi‡	
2009 (21st)	Kany García	
2009 (21st)	Alejandra Guzmán	
2009 (21st)	Julieta Venegas	
2009 (21st)	Yuridia	
2010 (22nd)	Laura Pausini‡	
2010 (22nd)	Fanny Lú	
2010 (22nd)	Nelly Furtado	
2010 (22nd)	Paulina Rubio	
2010 (22nd)	Gloria Trevi	
2011 (23rd)	Shakira‡	
2011 (23rd)	Nelly Furtado	
2011 (23rd)	Kany García	
2011 (23rd)	Paulina Rubio	
2011 (23rd)	Thalía	
2012 (24th)	Shakira‡	
2012 (24th)	Gloria Trevi	
2012 (24th)	Natalia Jiménez	
2012 (24th)	Norka	
2013 (25th)	Jenni Rivera‡	
2013 (25th)	Paulina Rubio	
2013 (25th)	Shakira	
2013 (25th)	Gloria Trevi	
2014 (26th)	Jenni Rivera‡	
2014 (26th)	Paulina Rubio	
2014 (26th)	América Sierra	
2014 (26th)	Thalía	
2014 (26th)	Yuridia	
2015 (27th)	Shakira‡	
2015 (27th)	Becky G	
2015 (27th)	Alejandra Guzmán	
2015 (27th)	Laura Pausini	
2015 (27th)	Gloria Trevi	
2016 (28th)	Natalia Jiménez‡	
2016 (28th)	Shakira	
2016 (28th)	Thalía	
2016 (28th)	Gloria Trevi	
2017 (29th)	Thalía	
2017 (29th)	Leslie Grace	
2017 (29th)	Sofia Reyes	
2017 (29th)	Gloria Trevi	

== See also ==
- List of music awards honoring women
- Grammy Award for Best Latin Pop Album
- Latin Grammy Award for Best Female Pop Vocal Album
