= Tradicional =

Studio album by Ana Gabriel
- Released: 14 September 2004 (Mexico)
- Recorded: 2003–2004
- Genre: Huapango; Ranchera; Banda; Corrido; Bolero; Norteño
- Label: Sony Discos

Ana Gabriel chronology
Dulce y salado (2003)	Tradicional (2004)	Dos amores un amante (2005)

Tradicional (English Traditional) is the 19th studio album by Mexican pop singer, Ana Gabriel. It was released in 2004. This album goes from the regional styles of Mexican music to ska. It was nominated in the category of Best Ranchero Album in the Latin Grammy Awards of 2005, but lost to Luis Miguel's México en la Piel.

== Track listing ==
Tracks:

1. Con las Alas Atadas (Huapango) 03:18
2. La Araña (Ranchera) 03:14
3. Volver, Volver (Balada) 03:16
4. Me Robaste el Amor (Bolero) 03:14
5. Simón Blanco (Corrido) 03:13
6. Que Te Vaya Bonito (Ranchera) 02:54
7. Al Maestro Con Cariño (Norteño) 03:08
8. Amarga Navidad (Ranchera) 02:59
9. Peladito y en la Boca (Ska) 02:27
10. Tú y las Nubes (Banda) 2:43
11. Y Tú No Estás (Instrumental) 03:17

== Album charts ==
#	Chart	U.S. Peak Position
1.	"Reg. Mex. Albums"	#20
2.	"Top Lat. Albums"	#30

- Note: This release reached the #20 position in Billboard Regional Mexican Albums staying for 1 week and it reached the #30 position in the Billboard Top Latin Albums staying for 6 weeks in the chart.
