= Premio Lo Nuestro 1992 =

4th Lo Nuestro Awards
- Date: Thursday, May 14, 1992
- Site: Caesars Palace; Las Vegas, Nevada, USA

Highlights
- Most awards: Ana Gabriel (4)
- Most nominations: Ana Gabriel (5)

The 4th Lo Nuestro Awards ceremony, presented by Univision honoring the best Latin music of 1991 and 1992 took place on May 14, 1992, at a live presentation held at the Caesars Palace in Las Vegas, Nevada. The ceremony was broadcast in the United States and Latin America by Univision.

During the ceremony, nineteen categories were presented. Winners were announced at the live event and included Mexican singer-songwriter Ana Gabriel receiving four competitive awards. Dominican singer Juan Luis Guerra, Mexican group Pandora, and American band La Mafia earned two accolades each.

== Background ==
In 1989, the Lo Nuestro Awards were established by Univision, to recognize the most talented performers of Latin music. The nominees and winners were selected by a voting poll conducted among program directors of Spanish-language radio stations in the United States and also based on chart performance on Billboard Latin music charts, with the results being tabulated and certified by the accounting firm Deloitte. The award included a trophy shaped like a treble clef. The categories were for the Pop, Tropical/Salsa, Regional Mexican genres and Music Video fields, and for the first time a Rap field was also considered. The 4th Lo Nuestro Awards ceremony was held on May 14, 1992, in a live presentation held at the Caesars Palace in Las Vegas. The ceremony was broadcast in the United States and Latin America by Univision.

== Winners and nominees ==
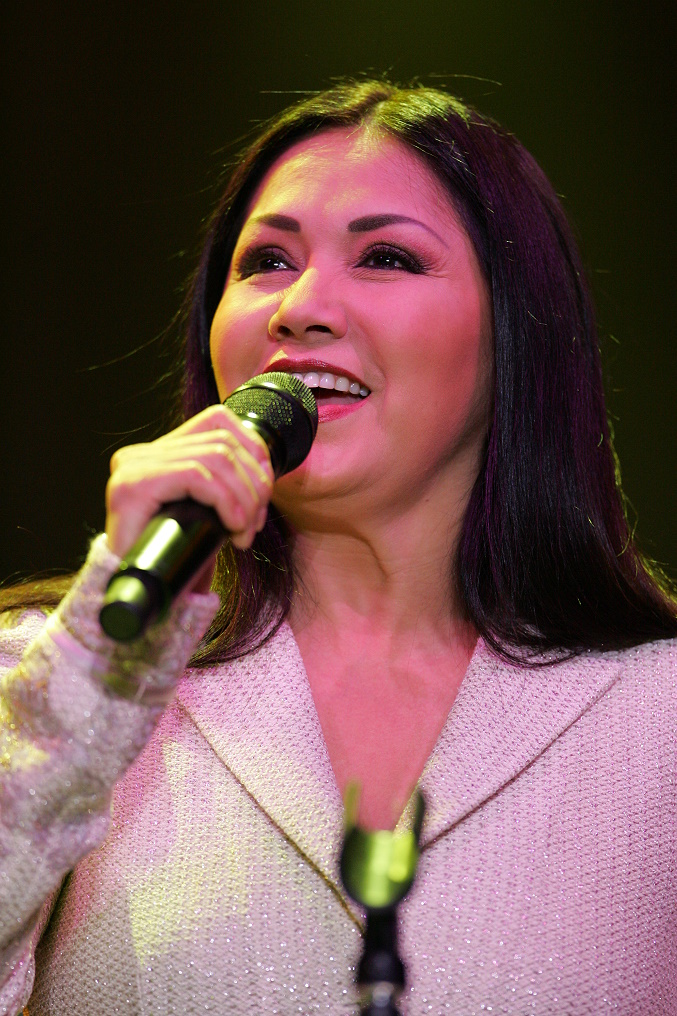
Mexican singer Ana Gabriel (pictured in 2006) won the Lo Nuestro Award for Pop Female Artist of the Year.

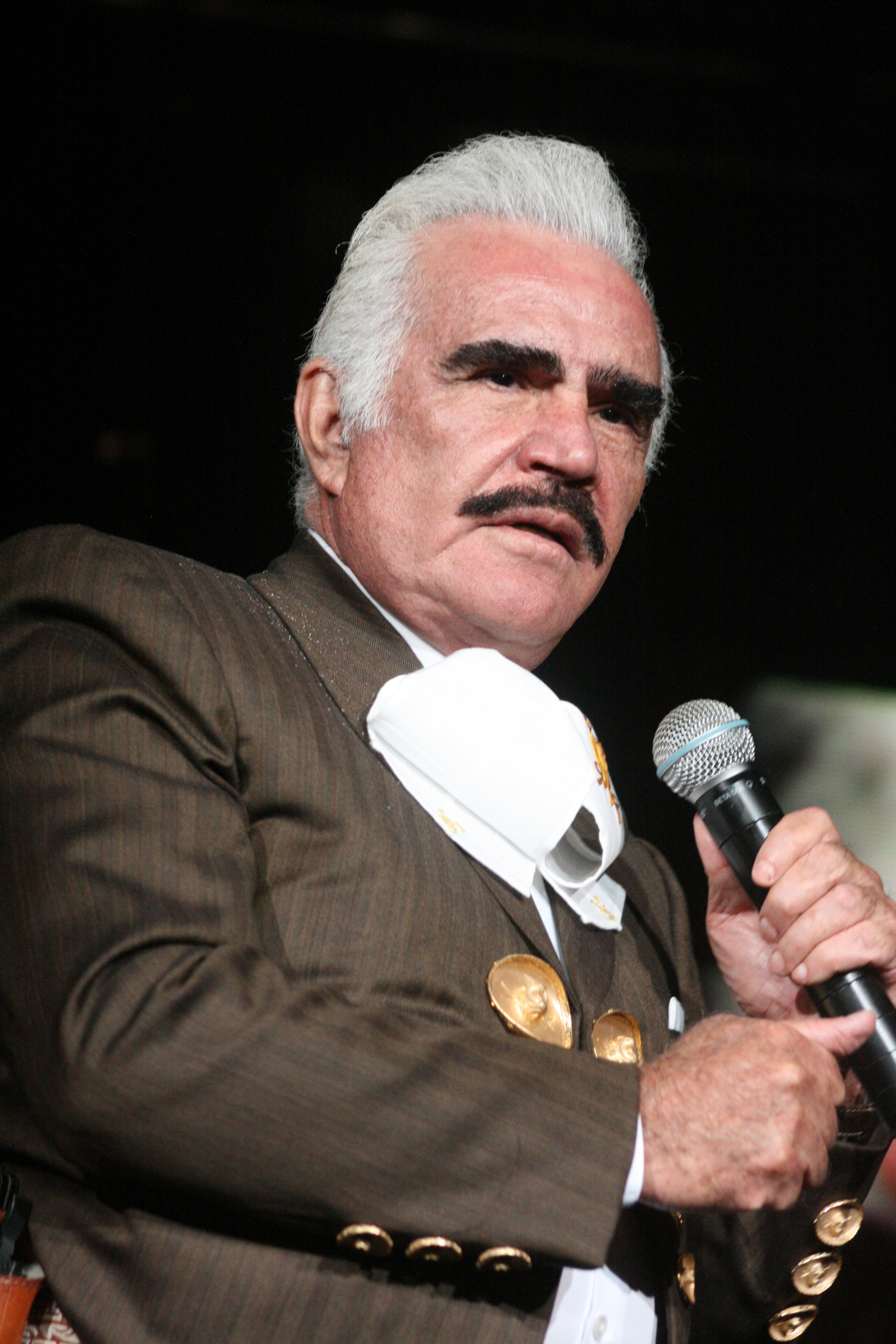
Singer Vicente Fernández (pictured in 2011) received the Male Regional Mexican Artist of the Year Award.

Winners were announced before the live audience during the ceremony. Mexican singer-songwriter Ana Gabriel set a record for most wins ever in a single ceremony, receiving four awards: Pop and Regional Mexican Female Artist of the Year, Pop Song of the Year ("Cosas del Amor"), and Regional Mexican Album of the Year for Mi México.

Dominican band Juan Luis Guerra y 440 were awarded Tropical Salsa Album of the Year for Bachata Rosa, which also received a Grammy Award for Best Tropical Latin Album. Mexican group Pandora won two awards, for Pop Group and Pop Album of the Year for their Grammy-nominated set Con Amor Eterno. Mexican singer Daniela Romo earned the accolade for Video of the Year for her number-one single "Todo, Todo, Todo". Cuban-American singer-songwriter Gloria Estefan received the Lifetime Achievement Award.

Winners and nominees of the 4th Annual Lo Nuestro Awards.
Pop Album of the Year	Pop Song of the Year
Pandora – Con Amor Eterno; Ana Gabriel – En Vivo; Juan Gabriel – En el Palacio de Bellas Artes; Ricardo Montaner – En el Último Lugar del Mundo; Daniela Romo – Amada Más Que Nunca	Vikki Carr and Ana Gabriel – "Cosas del Amor"; Los Bukis – "Mi Deseo"; Ricardo Montaner – "Déjame Llorar"; Daniela Romo – "Todo, Todo, Todo"; Camilo Sesto – "Amor Mío, ¿Qué Me Has Hecho?"
Pop Male Artist of the Year	Pop Female Artist of the Year
Luis Miguel; Raúl di Blasio; Juan Gabriel; Ricardo Montaner	Ana Gabriel; Vikki Carr; Daniela Romo; Gloria Trevi
Pop Group of the Year	New Pop Artist of the Year
Pandora; Azúcar Moreno; Los Bukis; Gipsy Kings	Magneto; H2O; Ricky Martin; Simone
Regional Mexican Album of the Year	Regional Mexican Song of the Year
Ana Gabriel – Mi México; Bronco – Amigo; Vicente Fernández and Ramón Ayala – Arriba el Norte y Arriba el Sur; Mazz – Para Nuestra Gente; Various Artists – México, Voz y Sentimiento	La Mafia – "Como Me Duele Amor"; Bronco – "Déjame Amarte Otra Vez"; Bronco – "Si Te Vuelves a Enamorar"; Los Caminantes – "Dos Cartas y Una Flor"; Vicente Fernández – "Que Sepan Todos"
Male Regional Mexican Artist of the Year	Female Regional Mexican Artist of the Year
Vicente Fernández; Ramón Ayala; Roberto Pulido; Juan Valentin	Ana Gabriel; Rocío Banquells; Linda Ronstadt; Selena
Regional Mexican Group of the Year	Regional Mexican New Artist of the Year
La Mafia; Bronco; Mazz; La Sombra	Grupo Mojado; Esmeralda; Lalo y Los Descalzos; Tecno Banda
Tropical Salsa Album of the Year	Tropical Salsa Song of the Year
Juan Luis Guerra y 440 – Bachata Rosa; Banda Blanca – Fiesta Tropical; Luis Enrique – Luces del Alma; Jerry Rivera – Abriendo Puertas; Eddie Santiago – Soy el Mismo	La Banda Show – "Ella Me Vacila"; Banda Blanca – "Fiesta"; Juan Luis Guerra y 440 – "Frío, Frío"; Víctor Víctor – "Ando Buscando Un Amor"; Víctor Víctor – "Mesita de Noche"
Tropical Salsa Artist of the Year	Tropical Salsa Group of the Year
Eddie Santiago; Luis Enrique; Jerry Rivera; Nino Segarra	Juan Luis Guerra y 440; Banda Blanca; Grupo Niche; Orquesta de la Luz
Tropical Salsa New Artist of the Year	Rap Artist of the Year
Víctor Víctor; Alex D'Castro; Antonio Cruz; Xavier	El General; Lisa M; Vico C; Fransheska
Video of the Year
Daniela Romo – "Todo, Todo, Todo"; Vikki Carr and Ana Gabriel – "Cosas del Amor"; Camilo Sesto – "Amor Mío, ¿Qué Me Has Hecho?"; Ricardo Montaner – "Sera"; Ricardo Montaner – "Déjame Llorar"; Franco De Vita – "No Basta"; Magneto – "Vuela Vuela"; Emmanuel – "No He Podido Verte"; Pandora – "Popurri"; Banda Blanca – "Fiesta"

== See also ==
- 1991 in Latin music
- 1992 in Latin music
- Grammy Award for Best Latin Pop Album
