= Luna (Ana Gabriel album) =

Studio album by Ana Gabriel
- Released: November 9, 1993
- Recorded: 1993
- Genre: Pop
- Label: Sony Music
- Producer: Ana Gabriel

Ana Gabriel chronology
Personalidad: 20 Éxitos (1992)	Luna (1993)	Ayer y hoy (1994)

Luna (English Moon) is the ninth studio album by Mexican pop singer Ana Gabriel. It was released on November 9, 1993. This material was produced by herself.

== Track listing ==
Tracks:

1. Tu Nombre Es Traición
2. Luna (Juan Gabriel)
3. Pacto de Amor
4. Estas Emociones (Ode E Adao)
5. Me Estoy Enamorando
6. Somos Dos
7. Sé Que Te Vas
8. Dame Una Oportunidad
9. Eres Diferente
10. Vaya Fin de Semana
11. Háblame de Frente
12. Entre Dos (O Bondade)
13. Eres Diferente (Ft. Yuri)

== Singles ==
- Luna (Her 7th #1 for 3 weeks in Hot Latin Songs)
- Estas Emociones
- Háblame de frente

=== Singles charts ===
- "Luna" reached #1 on Hot Latin Songs.
- "Estas Emociones" reached #15 on Hot Latin Songs.
- "Háblame de Frente"reached #5 on Hot Latin Songs.

== Charts ==
Luna peaked at number nine on the Billboard Top Latin Albums chart during a 30-week stay and number six on the Latin Pop Albums chart where it remained on the chart for 26 weeks.

== Certifications ==
Region	Certification	Certified units/sales
Mexico (AMPROFON)	Platinum	250,000^{‡}
United States (RIAA)	2× Platinum (Latin)	200,000^{^}
^{^} Shipments figures based on certification alone.^{‡} Sales+streaming figures based on certification alone.
