= Mestizzo =

Mexican pop music band

Mestizzo is a Mexican pop music band. The group was created in 1994 in Mexico City. The group is one of the few Mexican entertainment productions to showcase Afro-Mexican talent, as one of their singers is a Black woman.

The band debuted at the 1994 Acapulco Festival. The band went on a nationwide tour in Mexico during 1995. By early 1997, the band was known to United States Hispanic audiences with their hit "El Tongoneo", for which the band made a video. Mestizzo was sponsored in the United States by Miller Beer, a commercial of the beer brand featuring a version of El Tongoneo that mentioned Miller Beer.

The band was personally invited by Prince Albert of Monaco to perform at the Cannes Festival in France.

Among other Mestizzo hits was a cover version of La Macarena, and a song named "El Ruletero".

== Members ==
- Pablo Montero
- Adrián Casasola
- Lucía Muñoz
- Claudia Yatana
- Heriberto – joined the group on the "Baila Morena" cd
- Humberto Ramos
- Jéssica Díaz de León
- Patricia – joined the group on the "Baila Morena' cd
- Raúl Magaña
- Sheila Berrio
- Verónica Jaspeado
- Karenka Juantorena – joined the group on the "Baila Morena" cd
