= Dos amores un amante =

Dos amores, un amante

Studio album by Ana Gabriel
- Released: 5 December 2005 (Mexico)
- Recorded: 2005
- Genre: Ranchera
- Label: EMI Music
- Producer: Ana Gabriel

Ana Gabriel chronology
Tradicional (2004)	Dos amores, un amante (2005)	Arpegios de Amor (2007)

Professional ratings
Review scores
Source	Rating
Allmusic	4.5/5 stars

Dos amores un amante (English Two loves one lover) is the 20th studio album by the Mexican pop singer, Ana Gabriel. It was released in 2005. It was produced by herself. It was nominated in the category of Female Latin Pop Album Of The Year in the Latin Billboard Music Awards of 2007, but lost to Paulina Rubio's Ananda.

== Track listing ==
Tracks:

1. Olvídate de Ellos 03:40
2. Desahogo - Erasmo Carlos / Roberto Carlos 03:16
3. La Farsante - Juan Gabriel 03:17
4. Te Llegará Mi Olvido - Juan Gabriel 02:24
5. Sin Tu Amor 04:01
6. La Distancia - Erasmo Carlos / Roberto Carlos 03:41
7. Aprendiste a Volar 02:54
8. Las Llaves de Mi Alma - Vicente Fernández 02:47
9. Debo Hacerlo - Juan Gabriel 04:28
10. Qué Será de Ti - Antonio Marcos / M. Marcos03:26 deluxe
11. Por Tu Maldito Amor 03:43
12. Siete Veces Siete Más 02:51
13. Qué Será de Ti 03:26

== Album charts ==
#	Chart	U.S. Peak Position
1.	"Lat. Pop Albums"	#8
2.	"Top Lat. Albums"	#22
3.	"Heatseekers (South Atlantic)"	#4
4.	"Top Heatseekers"	#18

- Note: This release reached the #8 position in Billboard Latin Pop Albums staying for 16 weeks and it reached the #22 position in the Billboard Top Latin Albums staying for 11 weeks in the chart.

== Singles ==
- Sin Tu Amor
- Olvídate de Ellos
- Desahogo

=== Singles charts ===
"Sin tu amor" reaheced #39 on Hot Latin Songs and #10 on Latin Pop Airplay.

== Sales and certifications ==
Region	Certification	Certified units/sales
United States (RIAA)	Platinum (Latin)	100,000^{^}
^{^} Shipments figures based on certification alone.

== Awards and nominations ==
#	Award	Category	Result	Notes
1.	Billboard Latin Music Awards	Female Latin Pop Album	Nominated	Lost to Paulina Rubio's Ananda
2.	Latin Grammy Awards	Best Ranchero Album	Nominated	Lost to Pepe Aguilar's Historias de Mi Tierra
3.	Latin Grammy Awards	Best Regional Mexican Song: Sin Tu Amor	Nominated	Lost to Conjunto Primavera's Aún Sigues Siendo Mia
