= Soy como soy =

Studio album by Ana Gabriel
- Released: 27 April 1999 (Mexico)
- Recorded: 1998
- Genre: Pop
- Length: 37:51
- Label: Sony Internacional
- Producer: Kike Santander; Juan Vicente Zambrano; Héctor Garrido

Ana Gabriel chronology
...En la Plaza de Toros México (1998)	Soy como soy (1999)	Eternamente (2000)

Professional ratings
Review scores
Source	Rating
Billboard	4.5/5 stars

Soy como soy (English I am just the way I am) is the 15th studio album by Mexican pop singer, Ana Gabriel. It was released on 1999. This material shows her firmly planted in the pop music, guided by the masterful hand of producer Emilio Estefan Jr. Gabriel composed some of the songs, with collaborations by Estefan himself, as well as renowned pop composer Kike Santander. It was recorded at Crescent Moon Studios, Miami, Florida.

== Track listing ==
Tracks:

1. Lo Sé 04:11
2. Si Me Faltarás 03:48
3. No A Pedir Perdón 03:50
4. Obsesión 03:38
5. Siempre Tú 04:45
6. Porqué Volviste 03:26
7. Sólo Quiero Ser Amada 03:30
8. Me Haces Falta 04:34
9. Soy Como Quise Ser 03:27
10. Claro De Luna 02:52

== Charts ==
Chart	Peak position
US Top Latin Albums (Billboard)	19
US Latin Pop Albums (Billboard)	9

== Singles ==
- Si Me Faltaras reached #30 on Hot Latin Tracks and #32 on Latin Pop Airplay.
- No A Pedir Perdón
- Obsesión

== Sales and certifications ==
Region	Certification	Certified units/sales
Mexico (AMPROFON)	Gold	75,000^{^}
United States (RIAA)	Platinum (Latin)	100,000^{^}
^{^} Shipments figures based on certification alone.
