= Eternamente (album) =

Album by Ana Gabriel

Studio album by Ana Gabriel
- Released: 4 April 2000 (Mexico)
- Genre: Bolero
- Length: 38:34
- Label: Sony Internacional
- Producer: Ana Gabriel; Ernesto Abrego

Ana Gabriel chronology
Soy como soy (1999)	Eternamente (2000)	Huelo a soledad (2001)

Professional ratings
Review scores
Source	Rating
Allmusic	3.5/5 stars
Billboard	4.0/5 stars

Eternamente (English Endlessly) is the 16th studio album by Mexican pop singer Ana Gabriel. It was released in 2000. This material shows a nostalgic Ana Gabriel where she pays tribute to the Bolero's fathers Los Panchos and Los Diamantes. It was recorded at Sony Studios, Mexico.

== Track listing ==
Tracks:

1. Poquita Fe 03:06
2. Como Un Lunar 02:53
3. Dios No Lo Quiera 03:24
4. No Lloraré 02:48
5. Caminos Diferentes 02:58
6. Por Ti 04:21
7. Flores Negras 03:29
8. Tú Me Acostumbraste 02:46
9. Historia de un Amor 03:08
10. Franqueza 03:21
11. Más Que Un Simple Amor (Te Quieres Engañar) 03:37
12. Eternamente 02:55

== Album charts ==
#	Chart	U.S. Peak Position
1.	"Lat. Pop Albums"	#11
2.	"Top Lat. Albums"	#23

- Note: This release reached the #11 position in Billboard Latin Pop Albums staying for 5 weeks and it reached the #23 position in the Billboard Top Latin Albums staying for 13 weeks in the chart.

== Sales and certifications ==
Region	Certification	Certified units/sales
Mexico (AMPROFON)	Gold	75,000^{^}
United States (RIAA)	Platinum (Latin)	100,000^{^}
^{^} Shipments figures based on certification alone.
