= Ayer y Hoy (Ana Gabriel album) =

Studio album by Ana Gabriel
- Released: 1994
- Recorded: 1994
- Genres: Ranchera; Regional
- Label: Sony Discos
- Producer: Ana Gabriel

Ana Gabriel chronology
Luna (1993)	Ayer y Hoy (1994)	Joyas de dos siglos (1995)

Ayer y Hoy (English Yesterday and today) is the 10th studio album by Mexican pop singer Ana Gabriel. It was released on 1994. This material was produced by herself. She praises several idols of ranchera music with this material like Agustín Lara, José A. Jiménez, Juan Gabriel, Armando Manzanero and Cuco Sánchez. Ayer y Hoy was nominated for a Lo Nuestro Award for Regional Mexican Album of the Year at the 7th Lo Nuestro Awards.

== Track listing ==
Tracks:

1. Mírales, Escúchales - 03:22
2. Que Manera De Perder - 03:28
3. Dos Locos De Amor - 03:05
4. Como Agua Para Chocolate - 04:09
5. Tú Lo Decidiste - 03:49
6. Último Adiós - 03:30
7. Parece Que Fue Ayer - 03:10
8. Vámonos - 02:59
9. No Tengo Dinero - 03:14
10. De Aquí Para Allá - 03:45
11. Silverio Pérez - 02:37
12. México Lindo & Querido/Cielito Lindo - 05:25

== Singles ==
- Tú Lo Decidiste
- Como Agua Para Chocolate
- No Tengo Dinero

== Album chart ==
This release reached the #2 position in Regional Mexican Albums staying for 26 weeks and it reached the #6 position in the Billboard Top Latin Albums staying for 35 weeks in the chart.

== Certifications ==
Region	Certification	Certified units/sales
Mexico (AMPROFON)	Platinum+Gold	350,000^{‡}
United States (RIAA)	2× Platinum (Latin)	200,000^{^}
^{^} Shipments figures based on certification alone.^{‡} Sales+streaming figures based on certification alone.
