= La Reina Canta a México =

La Reina Canta a Mexico

Compilation album by Ana Gabriel
- Released: 7 November 2006 (Mexico)
- Recorded: 2006
- Genre: Ranchera; Regional; Corrido
- Label: Sony International

Ana Gabriel Compilations chronology
Canciones de Amor (2006)	La Reina Canta a Mexico (2006)	Best of Ana Gabriel (2006)

La Reina Canta a México (English The Queen Sings to Mexico) is a compilation album by the Mexican pop singer, Ana Gabriel. It was released in 2006. It won in the category of Regional Mexican Album of the Year, Female Group or Female Solo Artist in the Latin Billboard Music Awards of 2007.

== Track listing ==
Tracks:

1. Volver, Volver 03:18
2. Parece Que Fue Ayer 03:14
3. La Despedida 02:56
4. México Lindo y Querido 02:51
5. El Gallo de Oro 02:32
6. Vámonos 03:03
7. Cielito Lindo 02:38
8. La Barca de Oro 02:59
9. No Tengo Dinero 03:17
10. Me Equivoqué Contigo 02:55
11. Qué Manera de Perder 03:30
12. Silverio Pérez 02:42
13. Que Te Vaya Bonito 02:56
14. Tú lo Decidiste 03:53
15. Tú y Las Nubes 02:46
16. Hasta Que Te Conocí 03:47

== Album charts ==
#	Chart	U.S. Peak Position
1.	"Reg. Mex. Albums"	#1
2.	"Top Lat. Albums"	#9
3.	"Top Heatseekers"	#3
4.	"Heatseekers (Mountain)"	#1
5.	"Heatseekers (South Atlantic)"	#4
6.	"Heatseekers (South Central)"	#2
7.	"Heatseekers (Pacific)"	#1
8.	"Billboard 200"	#166

- Note: This release reached the #1 position in Billboard Regional Mexican Albums staying for 17 weeks and it reached the #9 position in the Billboard Top Latin Albums staying for 7 weeks in the chart. This was also her second entry to the Billboard 200.

== Certifications ==
Region	Certification	Certified units/sales
Mexico (AMPROFON)	Platinum	100,000^{‡}
^{‡} Sales+streaming figures based on certification alone.
