= Quién como tú =

Studio album by Ana Gabriel
- Released: November 17, 1989
- Recorded: 1989
- Genre: Pop
- Label: Sony Music
- Producer: Óscar Gómez

Ana Gabriel chronology
Tierra de Nadie (1988)	Quién como tú (1989)	En Vivo (1990)

Professional ratings
Review scores
Source	Rating
La Opinión	4/4 stars

Quién como tú (English Who like you) is the fifth studio album by Mexican pop singer Ana Gabriel. It was released on November 17, 1989. The album was nominated to the Grammy Award for Best Latin Pop Album in 1990, but lost to José Feliciano's ¿Por Qué Te Tengo Que Olvidar? (Why do I have to forget you?). The album was awarded "Pop Album of the Year" at the 1991 Lo Nuestro awards. The album reached number one in the Billboard Latin Pop Albums staying in the chart for 48 weeks.

== Track listing ==
Tracks:

1. Quién Como Tú - 03:35
2. Baila El Reggae - 03:36
3. Ni Un Roce (Nem Um Toque) - 04:32
4. En la Oscuridad - 03:56
5. Adiós Tristeza (Bye Bye Tristeza) - 04:18
6. Algo (Something) (George Harrison) - 03:19
7. Hice Bien Quererte [Lambada] Version Corta - 04:04
8. Sólo Quiero Ser Amada - 03:30
9. Déjame Sola - 03:30
10. Fui Yo - 05:10

== Singles ==
- Quién como tú reached #1 on Hot Latin Tracks.
- Ni Un Roce reached #4 on Hot Latin Songs.
- Hice Bien Quererte

== Commercial performance ==
Quién Como Tú reached number one on the Billboard Latin Pop Albums, making it her second album to top the chart.

== Certifications ==
Region	Certification	Certified units/sales
Mexico (AMPROFON)	2× Platinum	500,000^{‡}
^{‡} Sales+streaming figures based on certification alone.

== See also ==
- List of number-one Billboard Latin Pop Albums from the 1980s
