= Dulce y salado =

Album by Ana Gabriel

Dulce y Salado

Studio album by Ana Gabriel
- Released: 14 November 2003 (Mexico)
- Genre: Ranchera; Regional; Mariachi
- Label: Sony Internacional
- Producer: Ana Gabriel; Roberto Roffiel

Ana Gabriel chronology
| Huelo a soledad (2001/2002) | Dulce y Salado (2003) | Tradicional (2004) |

Dulce y salado (English Sweet and salty) is the 18th studio album by Mexican pop singer, Ana Gabriel. It was released in 2003. This album won for Regional Mexican Album Of The Year, Female Group or Female Solo Artist in the Billboard Latin Music Awards.

== Track listing ==
Tracks:

1. Dulce y Salado 04:20
2. Llorándote 04:17
3. La Reina 03:37
4. Estoy Tan Sola 03:50
5. Pensando en Ti (Y Aquí Estoy Yo) 03:23
6. Y Tú No Estás 03:12
7. Mariachi Con Tambor 03:57
8. Jazmín 04:26
9. Amantes de Ocasión 04:37
10. Tengo Que Esperar 03:23
11. Sweet and Salty 04:16

== Album charts ==
| # | Chart | U.S. Peak Position |
|---|---|---|
| 1. | "Lat. Pop Albums" | #14 |
| 2. | "Top Lat. Albums" | #27 |

- Note: This release reached the #11 position in Billboard Regional Mexican Albums staying for 5 weeks and it reached the #27 position in the Billboard Top Latin Albums staying for 4 weeks in the chart.

== Singles ==
La Reina reached #39 on Latin Regional Mexican Airplay and #32 on Latin Pop Airplay.
