= En Vivo (Ana Gabriel album) =

Live album by Ana Gabriel
- Released: 1990 (Mexico)
- Recorded: 1990
- Genre: Pop; Concert
- Length: 59:29
- Label: Sony Discos
- Director: Max Pierre

Ana Gabriel chronology
Quién como tú (1989)	En Vivo (1990)	Mi México (1991)

En Vivo (English Live) is the sixth album by Mexican pop singer, Ana Gabriel. It was released on 1990. This album reached No. 1 in the Billboard Latin Pop Albums. This was her first live material and was nominated for Pop Album of the Year at the Lo Nuestro Awards of 1992.

== Track listing ==
Tracks:

1. En la Oscuridad - 04:39
2. Mar Y Arena - 03:18
3. Amor - 04:14
4. Es el Amor Quien Llega - 03:45
5. Pecado Original - 03:24
6. Quien Como Tu - 03:29
7. Ay Amor - 03:06
8. Destino - 03:55
9. Hasta Que Te Conocí - 03:39
10. Propuesta - 03:21
11. Solamente Una Vez - 02:31
12. Ni Un Roce (featuring Rosana) - 04:37
13. Y Aquí Estoy - 03:43
14. Soledad - 03:47
15. Simplemente Amigos - 03:31
16. Hice Bien Quererte - 04:46

== Album chart ==
This release reached the No. 1 position on the Billboard Latin Pop Albums chart, her third album to top the chart.

== Certifications ==
Region	Certification	Certified units/sales
Argentina (CAPIF)	Platinum	60,000^{^}
Mexico (AMPROFON)	Diamond	1,000,000^{‡}
United States (RIAA)	2× Platinum (Latin)	200,000^{^}
^{^} Shipments figures based on certification alone.^{‡} Sales+streaming figures based on certification alone.

== See also ==
- List of best-selling albums in Mexico
- List of number-one Billboard Latin Pop Albums from the 1990s
