= Un estilo =

Un Estilo

Studio album by Ana Gabriel
- Released: 1985
- Recorded: 1983–85
- Genre: Pop
- Label: Sony Music

Ana Gabriel chronology
Un Estilo (1985)	Sagitario (1986)

Un Estilo (English A style) is the first studio album by Mexican pop singer Ana Gabriel. It was released on 1985. She participated with the song Búscame (Look for me) in the OTI Festival which media started to know about her. In the beginning she found it difficult, as no label was willing to give her the opportunity, til the then-label CBS Records, now Columbia Records, signed her. The sales of the album were low, though it was received well. The album also features a cover of the Eurythmics song "Right By Your Side" entitled Sin ti no sé amar.

== Track listing ==
Tracks:

1. Búscame
2. ¿Qué nos pasó?
3. Sin ti no sé amar (Right by your Side)
4. Lo quiero todo
5. ¿Quién te crees que soy?
6. Amor sin memoria
7. Promesas
8. No me lastimes más
9. Pienso en ti
10. Déjame vivir
11. Que sea por amor
