= Arpegios de amor: Requiem por tres almas =

Arpegios de Amor: Requiem por Tres Almas

Studio album by Ana Gabriel
- Released: September 25, 2007 (Mexico)
- Recorded: 2007
- Genre: Pop
- Length: 41 min
- Label: EMI Music
- Producer: Ana Gabriel; Roberto Roffiel

Ana Gabriel chronology
Dos amores, un amante (2005)	Arpegios de Amor: Requiem por Tres Almas (2007)

Arpegios de amor: Requiem por tres almas (English Arpeggios of love: Requiem for three souls) is the 21st studio album by the Mexican pop singer Ana Gabriel. It was released in 2007. It was produced by herself and Roberto Roffiel. It was nominated in the category of Best Female Pop Vocal Album in the Latin Grammy Awards of 2008, but lost to Kany García's Cualquier Día.

== Track listing ==
Tracks:

1. Cuanto Te Exraño 04:21
2. Te Diré 03:45
3. Como Duele 04:23
4. Sin Miedo a La Verdad 04:15
5. Pena de Amor 04:01
6. Se Necesita Algo Más 04:16
7. Te Amo 04:07
8. Contigo 03:30
9. Que Pena 03:09
10. Te Diré (Grupera Version) 03:44
11. Ven a Ver Llover 02:38

== Album charts ==
#	Chart	United States Peak Position
1.	"Lat. Pop Albums"	13
2.	"Top Lat. Albums"	50

The album reached the #13 position in Billboard Latin Pop Albums chart staying for six weeks and it reached the #50 position in the Billboard Top Latin Albums staying for two weeks in the chart.

== Singles ==
In the US, "Te diré" reached #50 on the Hot Latin Songs chart and #21 the on Latin Hot Airplay chart.
