= Los Fugitivos =

American grupera band founded in 1985

- Origin: Los Angeles, California, US
- Genre: Grupero
- Years active: 1985 - Present
- Labels: Rodven Universal Music Latin Entertainment, Sony Discos, Fugi Music Studios, JC Music Studios
- Members: Jaime Espinoza; Rogelio Peña; Angel Morales; Chris Salinas; Aarón Salinas
- Past members: Edi Espinoza (1985-2010); Roberto Nieto (1988- 1999); Hekar Rivero (1999- 2004); Miguel Angel Galarza (1985- 2010); Sergio Galarza (1990-2007); Mario Jimenez (1989); Marco Pedroza (2010-2014); Mario Alberto Oritz (7 mo)

Los Fugitivos is an American grupero from Los Angeles, California. The band was formed in 1985 as Grupo Kariño by brothers Jaime and Edi Espinoza. In 1991, with the addition singer-guitarist Roberto Nieto, the band rebranded as Los Fugitivos. Initially, they gained success with covers including "Esperando Por Ti," a Spanish-language version of Richard Marx's "Right Here Waiting." In 1993, they achieved their biggest hit with José Luis Perales' "La Loca," which peaked at number 3 on the Billboard Hot Latin Tracks chart. In 1998, they had another hit with a cover of Roberto Carlos' "Pajaro Herido," featured on their album Secretos. In 1999, Nieto was replaced by Hekar Rivero, and the band switched labels from PolyGram to Sony Discos, releasing their album "Mi Última Tentación" shortly after. Los Fugitivos recorded 10 albums, earning seven gold records and two platinum albums.

== Discography ==
=== As Grupo Kariño ===
- 1986 Este Dolor
- 1987 Locuras del Corazón
- 1988 Perdoname
- 1989 Tristes Momentos

=== As Los Fugitivos ===
- 1990 Corazón Gitano
- 1992 No Supiste Comprender
- 1993 Vanidosa
- 1994 Te Conquistaré
- 1995 Ilusiones
- 1996 Dios
- 1998 Secretos
- 1999 Mi Última Tentación
- 2000 Mil Fantasías
- 2001 Cancionero
- 2003 Un Ángel a Mi Lado
- 2005 Fue En un Cafe
- 2009 Nomás Contigo
- 2012 Quiero Ser
