= Huelo a soledad =

Studio album by Ana Gabriel
- Released: 18 September 2001 (Mexico)
- Genre: Pop
- Label: Sony Internacional
- Producer: Ana Gabriel; Mariano Pérez

Ana Gabriel chronology
Eternamente (2000)	Huelo a soledad (2001)	Dulce y salado (2003)

Professional ratings
Review scores
Source	Rating
Allmusic	3.0/5 stars

Huelo a soledad (English I smell the solitude) is the 17th studio album by Mexican pop singer Ana Gabriel. It was released in 2001. This album was nominated for Female Pop album of the Year in the Billboard Latin Music Awards, but lost to Jaci Velasquez's Mi Corazón.

== Track listing ==
=== Tracks ===
1. Miento a Mi Verdad 04:34
2. Amado Mio 05:22
3. Amigo Amante 05:15
4. Huelo a Soledad (A Capella) 04:22
5. Cinco Dias 04:06
6. Amándote 04:16
7. Tanto Amor 04:47
8. Huelo a Soledad 04:20
9. Desencuentro 03:47
10. Me He Cansado de Ti 04:24
11. Cuando Tienes Ganas 06:30

=== Bonus tracks ===
- 12. Huelo a Soledad (Banda Version) 03:52
- 13. Huelo a Soledad (Ranchera Version) 04:02

== Album charts ==
#	Chart	U.S. Peak Position
1.	"Lat. Pop Albums"	#14
2.	"Top Lat. Albums"	#26

- Note: This release reached the #14 position in Billboard Latin Pop Albums staying for 3 weeks and it reached the #26 position in the Billboard Top Latin Albums staying for 21 weeks in the chart.

== Singles ==
- Huelo a Soledad reached #8 on Hot Latin Songs and #9 on Latin Pop Airplay.

== Sales and certifications ==
Region	Certification	Certified units/sales
United States (RIAA)	Platinum (Latin)	100,000^{^}
^{^} Shipments figures based on certification alone.
