= Silueta (album) =

Studio album by Ana Gabriel
- Released: 1992 (Mexico); 1993 (U.S.)
- Recorded: 1992
- Genre: Pop
- Label: Sony Discos
- Producer: Max Pierre; Ana Gabriel

Ana Gabriel chronology
Mi México (1991)	Silueta (1992)	Personalidad: 20 Éxitos (1992)

Silueta (English Silhouette) is the eighth studio album by Mexican pop singer Ana Gabriel. It was released in 1992. This material was produced by Gabriel and Max Pierre.

== Track listing ==
1. "Tú Y Yo"
2. "Todavía Tenemos Tiempo"
3. "Amándole"
4. "Llena de Romance"
5. "Mal Contigo, Peor Sin Ti"
6. "Que Bien Me Siento"
7. "Silueta"
8. "Todo Terminó"
9. "Hay Que Hablar"
10. "Quiero Yo Saber"
11. "Evidencias"
12. "Te Amo"

== Singles ==
- "Silueta"
- "Hay Que Hablar"
- "Todavía Tenemos Tiempo"
- "Tú Y Yo"
- "Evidencias" (1993)

== Charts ==
Silueta reached number one on the Billboard Latin Pop Albums chart, her fourth album to do so, and remained on the chart for 43 weeks.

== Certifications ==
Region	Certification	Certified units/sales
Mexico (AMPROFON)	Platinum	250,000^{‡}
^{‡} Sales+streaming figures based on certification alone.

== See also ==
- List of number-one Billboard Latin Pop Albums from the 1990s
