= Vivencias (Ana Gabriel album) =

Studio album by Ana Gabriel
- Released: 1996
- Recorded: 1996
- Genre: Pop
- Length: 43:14
- Label: Sony Internacional
- Producer: Ana Gabriel

Ana Gabriel chronology
Joyas de dos siglos (1995)	Vivencias (1996)	Con un mismo corazón (1997)

Vivencias (English Experiences) is the twelfth studio album by Mexican pop singer, Ana Gabriel. It was released on 1996. This material was produced by herself.

== Track listing ==
Tracks:

1. No Te Hago Falta 05:00
2. Es Tarde Ya 04:12
3. Sólo Fantasía (Como Imaginar) 05:19
4. Yo No Te Dije Adiós 03:55
5. Fue en Un Café (Under the Boardwalk) 03:34
6. No Sabes 03:52
7. Miedo 03:30
8. Esta Noche 03:26
9. Tú No Te Imaginas 03:44
10. Que Haré Sin Ti 03:19
11. Under the Boardwalk 03:34

== Album Charts ==
#	Chart	U.S. Peak Position
1.	"Lat. Pop Alb."	#14
2.	"Top Lat. Albums"	#28

- Note: This release reached the #14 position in Billboard Latin Pop Albums staying for 5 weeks and it reached the #28 position in the Billboard Top Latin Albums staying for 15 weeks in the chart.

== Certifications ==
Region	Certification	Certified units/sales
Mexico (AMPROFON)	Gold	100,000^{‡}
^{‡} Sales+streaming figures based on certification alone.

== Singles ==
- No Te Hago Falta reached #12 on Hot Latin Songs.
