= Joyas de dos siglos =

Joyas de Dos Siglos

Studio album by Ana Gabriel
- Released: 1995
- Recorded: 1995
- Genre: Ranchera; Regional
- Length: 46:43
- Label: Sony Discos
- Producer: Ana Gabriel; Diana Veronica Paredes

Ana Gabriel chronology
Ayer y Hoy (1994)	Joyas de Dos Siglos (1995)	Vivencias (1996)

Professional ratings
Review scores
Source	Rating
Allmusic	4.0/5 stars

Joyas de dos siglos (English Gems of two centuries) is the eleventh studio album by Mexican pop singer, Ana Gabriel. It was released on 1995. This material was produced by herself and Diana Veronica Paredes. This album is somewhat of a departure from Gabriel's usual style, but it is one of the artistic high points of her career. It was nominated for Regional Mexican Album of the Year at the Lo Nuestro Awards of 1996.

== Track listing ==
Tracks:

1. Clemencia 03:14
2. Un Viejo Amor 03:17
3. Aburrido Me Voy 02:59
4. Ya Se Va la Embarcación 02:24
5. Despedida 02:55
6. Reconciliación 03:15
7. Hay Unos Ojos 02:57
8. Flor Triste 02:39
9. Boda Negra 03:47
10. Marchita el Alma 03:26
11. Orilla de Un Palmar 03:36
12. Pobre Bohemio 02:58
13. Adiós Mi Chaparrita 03:08
14. Barca de Oro 02:58
15. Valentín de la Sierra 03:25

== Album charts ==
#	Chart	United States Peak Position
1.	"Reg. Mex. Albums"	#5
2.	"Top Lat. Albums"	#12

- Note: This release reached the #5 position in Regional Mexican Albums staying for 17 weeks and it reached the #12 position in the Billboard Top Latin Albums staying for 23 weeks in the chart.

== Certifications ==
Region	Certification	Certified units/sales
Mexico (AMPROFON)	Platinum+Gold	350,000^{‡}
United States (RIAA)	2× Platinum (Latin)	200,000^{^}
^{^} Shipments figures based on certification alone.^{‡} Sales+streaming figures based on certification alone.
