= Sagitario (album) =

Studio album by Ana Gabriel
- Released: 1986
- Recorded: 1986
- Genre: Pop
- Label: CBS Mexico

Ana Gabriel chronology
Un estilo (1985)	Sagitario (1986)	Pecado Original (1987)

Sagitario (English Sagittarius) is the second studio album by Mexican pop singer Ana Gabriel. It was released in 1986. Once again, she participated in the OTI Festival with the song A tu Lado (By your side) which she achieved the 5th place.

== Track listing ==
Tracks:

1. Mar y Arena
2. Y Aquí Estoy
3. Eso no Basta
4. Tú y Yo (Dúo Con José Alberto Fuentes)
5. Qué poco Hombre
6. Malvado
7. Hasta Cuando (Até Quando)
8. A tu Lado
9. Besos Prohibidos
10. Llévame

== Certifications ==
Region	Certification	Certified units/sales
Mexico (AMPROFON)	Platinum	250,000^{‡}
^{‡} Sales+streaming figures based on certification alone.
