= Ana Gabriel =

Mexican singer and songwriter

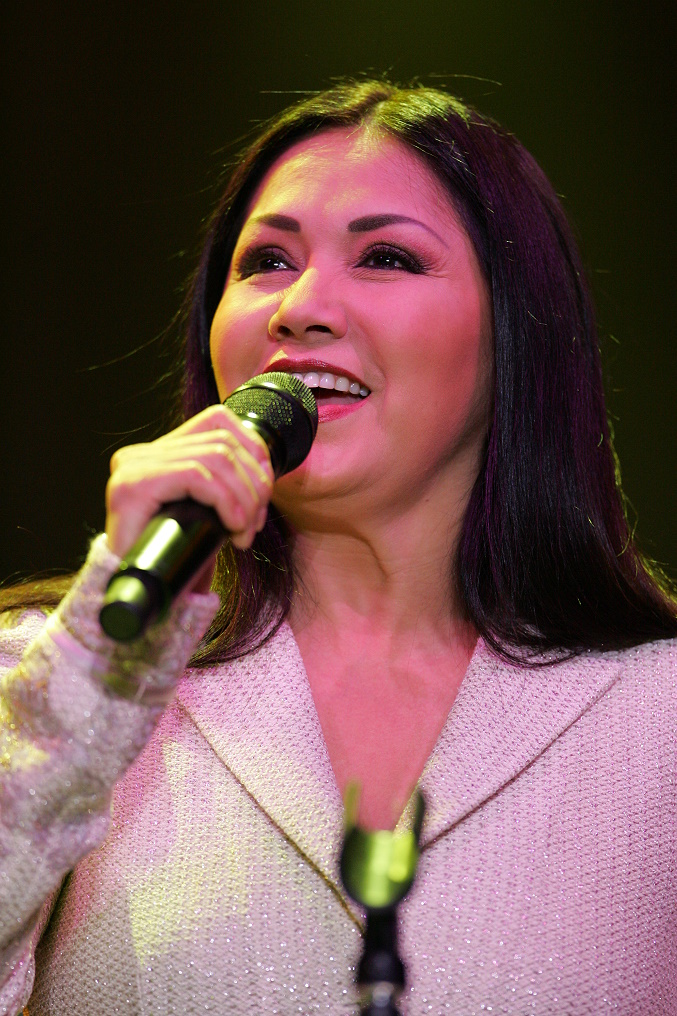
- Ana Gabriel performing in 2006
- Born: María Guadalupe Araujo Yong; December 10, 1955 (age 70); Guamúchil, Sinaloa, Mexico
- Occupations: Singer; songwriter; record producer
- Musical career
- Genres: Latin pop, Latin ballad, ranchera, mariachi, rock
- Years active: 1977–present
- Label: Sony

María Guadalupe Araujo Yong (born December 10, 1955), known professionally as Ana Gabriel, is a Mexican singer and songwriter. With over 40 million records sold worldwide, Gabriel is the best-selling Mexican female artist, and one of the best-selling Latin music artists of all time. Dubbed as the "Diva de América" and the "Luna de América", during her long career, she has performed different genres of music (primarily Latin pop, Latin ballad and Ranchera).

As of 2013, Gabriel had released twenty studio albums, three live albums, and fifteen compilation albums. Three of Gabriel's albums have topped the Top Latin Albums chart, and has achieved 7 number-one singles and 20 top 10 hits on the Hot Latin Songs chart, including "¡Ay, amor!", "Es Demasiado Tarde", and "Quién como tú"; for which she has been named the chart's seventh Greatest of All Time Artist.

She was included among the Greatest Latin Artists of All Time by Billboard. Her accolades include a Grammy Award nomination, four Latin Grammy Award nominations, five Billboard Latin Music Awards, thirteen Lo Nuestro Awards (including the Excellence Award), the Living Legend Award by Billboard Latin Women in Music; as well as awards from the American Society of Composers, Authors and Publishers (ASCAP), a star on the Hollywood Walk of Fame, and was inducted into the Latin Songwriters Hall of Fame in 2017.

== Early life ==
María Guadalupe Araujo Yong was born in Guamúchil, Sinaloa, Mexico on December 10, 1955. She did not receive formal training for singing and she credits her maternal grandfather Roberto Yong, an immigrant from China, for providing the only singing coaching she received.

She first sang on the stage at age six, singing "Regalo A Dios" by José Alfredo Jiménez. She moved to Tijuana, Baja California and studied accounting. At age 21, in 1977, she recorded her first song, titled "Compréndeme".

== Career ==
On October 4, 1987, Ana Gabriel won the 16th Mexican national selection for the OTI Festival with her own pop-power ballad song "¡Ay, amor!", and thus represented Mexico at the OTI Festival 1987 where she placed third. The song, performed with an orchestral arrangement in the festival, was later released as a single in its album version; it climbed to the top position in Mexico, throughout Ibero-America and on the Billboard Hot Latin Tracks chart for 14 consecutive weeks.

In 1988, Gabriel released her third album, Pecado Original, followed by Tierra de Nadie in 1989, which met with some chart success. Her 1990 album Quién Como Tú made her a force within the Mexican music industry. Eight months later, her live album En Vivo showcased her powerful stage act and scored several hits: "Hice Bien Quererte", "Propuesta", and "Solamente una Vez".

Throughout the 1990s, Gabriel released an album almost every year. A versatile singer, she showcased her talent as an interpreter of many different musical styles, from lambada to mariachi and romantic ballads to pop music. She also honed her skills as a songwriter and a producer, releasing Mi México, a ranchera-influenced, mariachi-backed pop album, in 1991. This unique blend of styles was also reflected in the songs, all written by Gabriel. Her lyrics described strong, active women involved in their love lives, counter to their passive, traditional depiction in older songs. The album also included a tribute to Mexico's most popular singer-songwriter, Juan Gabriel (no relation).

Gabriel scored a number-one hit with the duet "Cosas del Amor" in 1991, which she sang with Vikki Carr, a Mexican-American pop singer. The single earned Gabriel a Lo Nuestro Award for Song of the Year in 1992. At the same awards ceremony, Gabriel was also named Female Artist of the Year in the Regional Mexican category and Pop Female Artist of the Year; Mi México was named Regional Mexican Album of the Year. In 1993, Gabriel was awarded Best Pop Female Performer at the Lo Nuestro Awards. The following year, she appeared as a guest artist on Plácido Domingo's Grammy-nominated album, De Mi Alma Latina.

In 1996, she released the pop-oriented Vivencias. She followed this with the traditional ranchera album Con un Mismo Corazón in 1997, an album she wrote and produced herself. Of particular interest is her title-track duet with Vicente Fernández, one of the most prolific and popular ranchera singers in Mexican history. Burr wrote of the duet, "The beauty here lies in the melding of two great voices—Gabriel's husky sensuality and Fernandez's powerful, understated expressions—set against a 25-piece symphony."

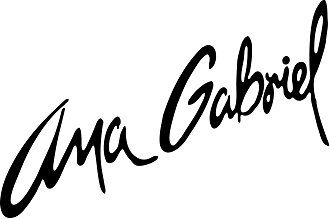
The logo that identifies Ana Gabriel in her career as a soloist.

Gabriel released another live album in 1998, En la Plaza de Toros México, a 30-track boxed set. That same year she traveled to Miami to work with the producer Emilio Estefan, Jr., on her 1999 album Soy Como Soy. The result was a pop-influenced ranchera album that went gold in the Latin music market and helped Gabriel win the Ritmo Latino Music Award for Female Pop Artist of the Year in 2000.

With the release of Eternamente in 2000, Gabriel returned to mariachi love ballads, using only guitar as accompaniment. That same year she also appeared with other Mexican music icons in an Independence Day television special called Viva Mexico, a celebration of Mexican music and history. In 2001 Gabriel released Huelo a Soledad, once again balancing the traditional sounds of Eternamente with sophisticated pop songs, a cappella numbers, and dance tracks.

In 2002, Gabriel's platinum-selling album Sagitario was released. In that same year, she won the Billboard Latin Music Estrella Award in recognition of her contribution to the Latin music industry, performed at a tribute concert for Vicente Fernandez sponsored by the Latin Music Awards, and participated in the ninth annual Las Cruces International Mariachi Concert and Festival in New Mexico. In December of that year, she was scheduled to perform at the eleventh annual Christmas Mariachi Festival in Phoenix, Arizona, but was denied a work visa and refused entry into the United States.

In December 2014, singer Ana Gabriel told reporters on TV Azteca's Ventaneando program that in 2015 she would release her new recording project after seven years without releasing an album with unreleased songs. She performed at the 2014 Viña del Mar Festival, receiving the award for most popular artist along with the Golden and Silver Seagull and Torch awards. In 2015, she received the Legend Award at the Hispanic Heritage Awards. Two years later, she was inducted into the Latin American Songwriters Hall Of Fame.

In 2017, Gabriel appeared in the multi award-winning documentary film The American Epic Sessions directed by Bernard MacMahon. In the film, Gabriel recorded live on the restored first electrical sound recording system from the 1920s. She performed Lydia Mendoza's "Mal Hombre" accompanied by a large band featuring Omar Rodríguez-López and Van Dyke Parks. Stephen Dalton in The Hollywood Reporter described her performance as "fantastic".

== Personal life ==
Gabriel is asexual.

== Discography ==
=== Studio albums ===
- Un estilo (1985)
- Sagitario (1986)
- Pecado Original (1987)
- Tierra de nadie (1988)
- Quién como tú (1989)
- Mi México (1991)
- Silueta (1992)
- Luna (1993)
- Ayer y hoy (1994)
- Joyas de dos siglos (1995)
- Vivencias (1996)
- Con un mismo corazón (1997)
- Soy como soy (1999)
- Eternamente (2000)
- Huelo a soledad (2001)
- Dulce y salado (2003)
- Tradicional (2004)
- Dos amores, un amante (2006)
- Arpegios de amor (2007)
- Renacer... Homenaje a Lucha Villa (2009)
- Por Amor a Ustedes (2020)

=== Live albums ===
- En Vivo (1990)
- ...En la Plaza de Toros México (1998)
- Altos de Chavón: El Concierto (2013)
- Un Mariachi en Altos de Chavón (2013)

=== Compilation albums ===
- The Best (1992)
- Amores (1992)
- Ayer y Hoy (1995)
- The Best: The Latin Stars Series (1998)
- 20th Anniversary (1999)
- 3 CD Box (1999)
- Una Voz Para tu Corazón - 30 Grandes Éxitos (2001)
- Colección de Oro (2002)
- Personalidad: 20 Éxitos (1992)
- Historia de Una Reina (2005)
- Canciones de Amor (2006)
- La Reina Canta a México (2006)
- Best of Ana Gabriel (2006)
- Con Sentimiento (2006)
- Los Gabriel… Simplemente Amigos (2007)
- Los Gabriel: Cantan a México (2008)
- Mis Favoritas (2010)
- Mi Regalo, Mis Número 1... (2015)
- Personalidad (2nd. Edition) (2016)
- Music from The American Epic Sessions (2017)

== Awards ==
=== Grammy Awards ===
The Grammy Awards are awarded annually by the National Academy of Recording Arts and Sciences in the United States. Ana Gabriel has received one nomination.

Year	Nominee / work	Award	Result
1991	Quién como tú	Best Latin Pop Performance	Nominated

=== Latin Grammy Awards ===
The Latin Grammy Awards are awarded annually by the Latin Academy of Recording Arts & Sciences in the United States. Gabriel has received four nominations.

Year	Nominee / work	Award	Result
2005	Tradicional	Best Ranchero Album	Nominated
2006	Dos amores un amante	Best Ranchero Album	Nominated
2006	"Sin Tu Amor"	Best Regional/Mexican Song	Nominated
2008	Arpegios de amor: Requiem por tres almas	Best Female Pop Vocal Album	Nominated

=== Lo Nuestro Awards ===
The Lo Nuestro Awards are awarded annually by television network Univision in the United States. Ana Gabriel has received thirteen awards from twenty-nine nominations.

Year	Nominee / work	Award	Result
1989	Herself	Best Pop Female Artist	Nominated
1990	Tierra de Nadie	Pop Album of the Year	Won
1990	"Simplemente Amigos"	Pop Song of the Year	Nominated
1990	Herself	Best Pop Female Artist	Won
1991	Quién como tú	Pop Album of the Year	Won
1991	Herself	Best Pop Female Artist	Won
1991	"Es Demasiado Tarde"	Pop Song of the Year	Won
1991	"Quién Como Tú"	Pop Song of the Year	Nominated
1992	En Vivo	Pop Album of the Year	Nominated
1992	"Cosas del Amor" (with Vikki Carr)	Pop Song of the Year	Won
1992	Mi México	Regional/Mexican Album of the Year	Won
1992	Herself	Best Pop Female Artist	Won
1992	Herself	Best Regional/Mexican Female Artist	Won
1993	Herself	Best Pop Female Artist	Won
1993	"Evidencias"	Pop Song of the Year	Nominated
1993	Herself	Best Regional/Mexican Female Artist	Nominated
1994	Luna	Pop Album of the Year	Nominated
1994	Herself	Best Pop Female Artist	Nominated
1995	"Luna"	Pop Song of the Year	Nominated
1995	Herself	Best Pop Female Artist	Nominated
1995	Ayer y Hoy	Regional/Mexican Album of the Year	Nominated
1995	Herself	Best Regional/Mexican Female Artist	Nominated
1996	Herself	Best Regional/Mexican Female Artist	Nominated
1996	Joyas de dos siglos	Regional/Mexican Album of the Year	Nominated
1998	Herself	Best Regional/Mexican Female Artist	Nominated
1998	Con un mismo corazón	Regional/Mexican Album of the Year	Nominated
1999	Herself	Best Regional/Mexican Female Artist	Won
2000	Herself	Best Regional/Mexican Female Artist	Won
2006	Herself	Excellence Award	Won

== See also ==
- List of best-selling Latin music artists

== Bibliography ==
- Lipsitz, George, Footsteps in the Dark: The Hidden Histories of Popular Music, U of Minnesota Press, 2007, ISBN 0-8166-5020-9
