= Mi México =

Studio album by Ana Gabriel
- Released: 1991
- Recorded: 1991
- Genre: Ranchera; Regional
- Label: Sony International
- Producer: Ernesto Abrego

Ana Gabriel chronology
En Vivo (1990)	Mi México (1991)	Silueta (1992)

Mi México (English My Mexico) is the sixth studio album by Mexican pop singer Ana Gabriel. It was released in 1991. In this album, she left behind her usual pop genre and instead sang in ranchera and regional styles. By 2009, Mi México had sold 4.5 million copies worldwide.

== Track listing ==
Tracks:

1. Mi Talismán — 04:51
2. ¿Cómo Olvidar? — 04:22
3. No Entiendo — 03:45
4. Oye — 03:16
5. Y Aquí Estoy — 04:12
6. Amigo Mío — 03:41
7. Ahora — 03:23
8. Sin Problemas — 03:33
9. Hechizo — 03:29
10. Voy A Ser — 04:06
11. No Siempre Se Gana — 02:28

== Singles ==
- Ahora reached #2 on Hot Latin Tracks.
- Sin Problemas reached #9 on Hot Latin Tracks.

== Album charts ==
The album reached number one on the Billboard Regional Mexican Albums chart and number nine on the Billboard Top Latin Albums chart.

== Sales and certifications ==
Region	Certification	Certified units/sales
Chile	—	200,000
Mexico (AMPROFON)	3× Platinum+Gold	850,000^{‡}
United States (RIAA)	4× Platinum (Latin)	400,000^{^}
^{^} Shipments figures based on certification alone.^{‡} Sales+streaming figures based on certification alone.
