= Lo Nuestro Award for Rock/Alternative Artist of the Year =

Latin music award

Lo Nuestro Awards for Rock/Alternative Artist of the Year
- Awarded for: Rock/Alternative Artist of the Year
- Country: United States
- Presented by: Univision
- First award: 2001
- Final award: 2013
- Currently held by: Maná (2013)

Highlights
- Most awards: Juanes (6)
- Website: univision.com/premiolonuestro

The Lo Nuestro Award for Rock/Alternative Artist of the Year was an honor presented annually by American network Univision. The Lo Nuestro Awards have been held since 1989 to recognize the most talented performers of Latin music. The nominees and winners were originally selected by a voting poll conducted among program directors of Spanish-language radio stations in the United States and also based on chart performance on Billboard Latin music charts, with the results being tabulated and certified by the accounting firm Arthur Andersen. At the present time, the winners are selected by the audience through an online survey. The trophy is shaped in the form of a treble clef. The categories awarded were for the Pop, Tropical/Salsa, Regional Mexican and Music Video fields before the 2000 awards, and from the following year onwards categories were expanded and included a Rock field for Album and Performer of the Year.

The award was first presented to Colombian singer Shakira, the only female winner. Colombian performer Juanes was the most nominated and biggest winner in the category, with six wins out of nine nominations. Mexican band Maná won the award four times. Mexican singer Alejandra Guzmán and ensembles Café Tacuba and Motel were the most nominated acts without a win, with three unsuccessful nominations each. In 2013, all the categories in the Rock Field (Artist, Album and Song of the Year) were merged into the Pop Field.

== Winners and nominees ==
Listed below are the winners of the award for each year, as well as the other nominees for the majority of the years awarded.

Key	Meaning
‡	Indicates the winning album

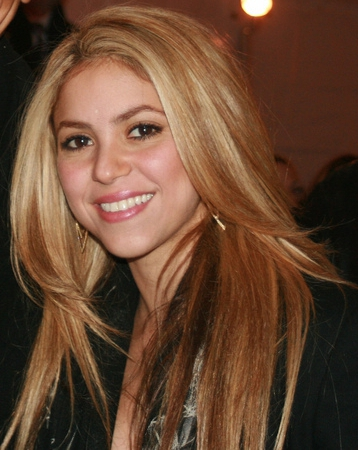
Colombian performer Shakira (pictured in 2009), winner in 2001.

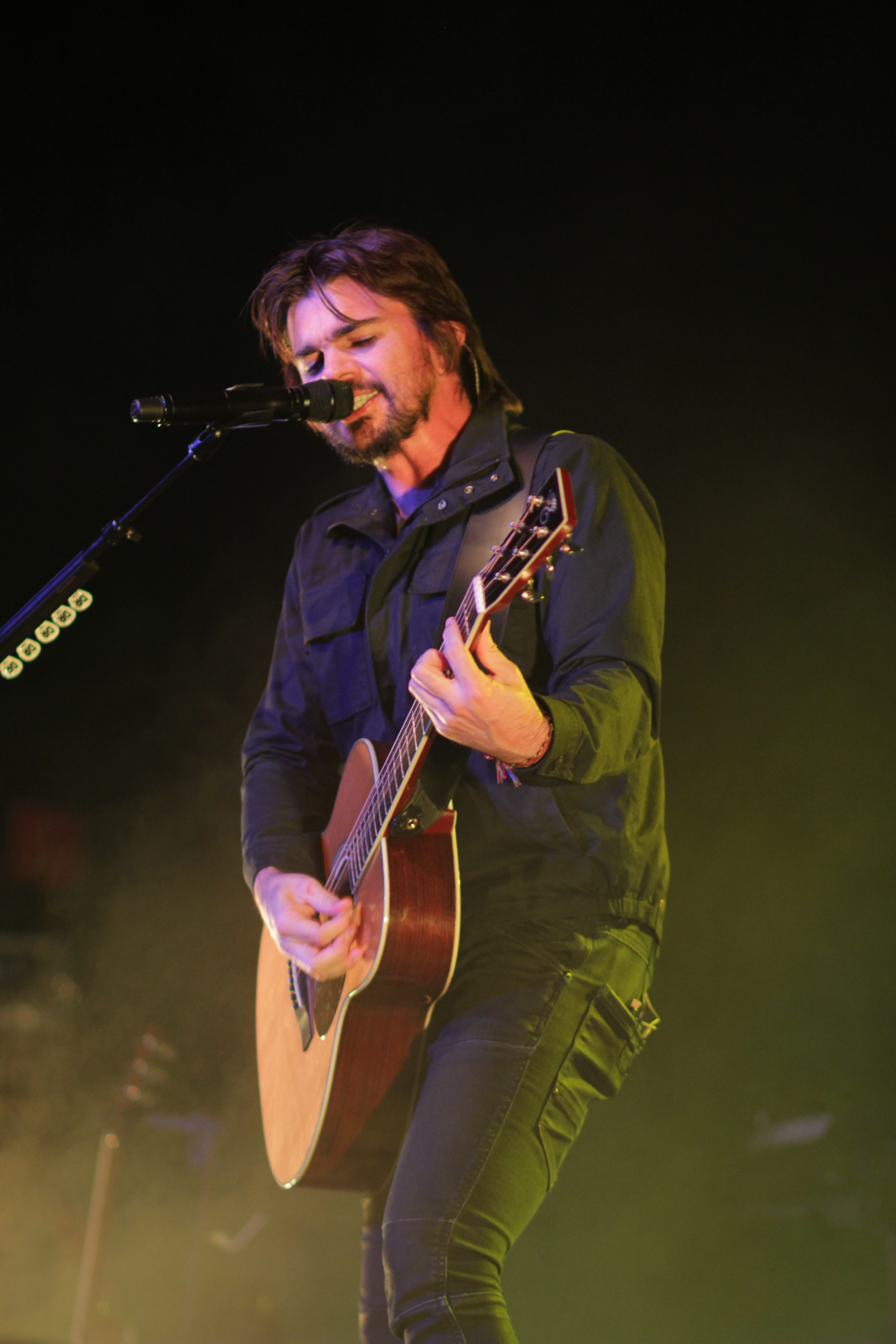
Colombian performer Juanes (pictured in 2012), the most awarded performer with six wins.

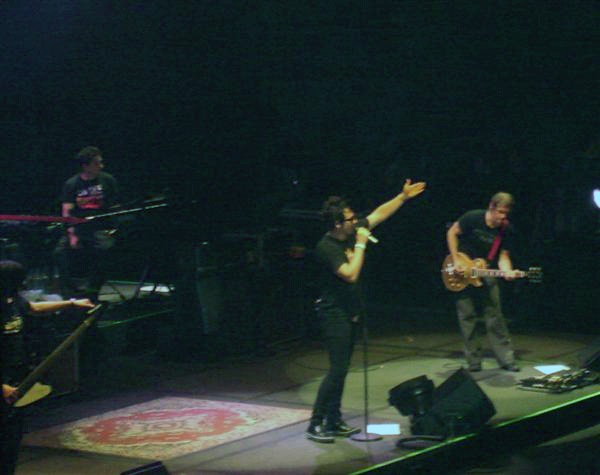
Chilean band La Ley (pictured in 2005), winners in 2002.

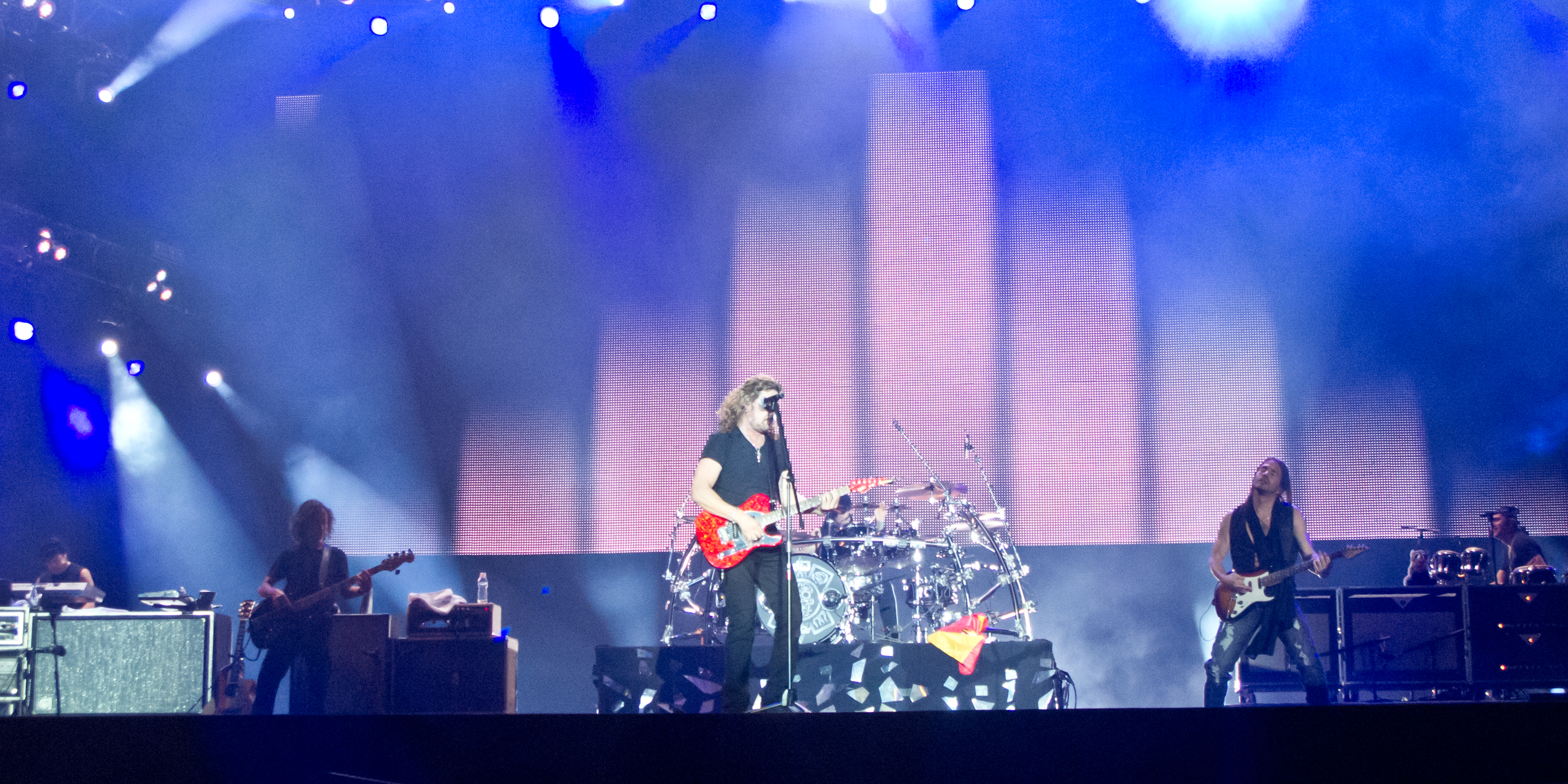
Four-time winners, Mexican band Maná

Year	Performer(s)	Ref
2001 (13th)	Shakira‡	
2001 (13th)	La Ley	
2001 (13th)	Maldita Vecindad	
2001 (13th)	El Tri	
2002 (14th)	La Ley‡	
2002 (14th)	Aterciopelados	
2002 (14th)	Café Tacuba	
2002 (14th)	El Gran Silencio	
2002 (14th)	Jaguares	
2003 (15th)	Juanes‡	
2003 (15th)	Cabas	
2003 (15th)	Los Rabanes	
2003 (15th)	Maná	
2004 (16th)	Jaguares‡	
2004 (16th)	Café Tacuba	
2004 (16th)	El Gran Silencio	
2004 (16th)	Molotov	
2005 (17th)	Juanes‡	
2005 (17th)	Kinky	
2005 (17th)	Maná	
2005 (17th)	Julieta Venegas	
2006 (18th)	Juanes‡	
2006 (18th)	Enjambre	
2006 (18th)	Circo	
2006 (18th)	La Secta AllStar	
2007 (19th)	Maná‡	
2007 (19th)	Babasónicos	
2007 (19th)	Alejandra Guzmán	
2007 (19th)	Juanes	
2008 (20th)	Maná‡	
2008 (20th)	Allison	
2008 (20th)	Moderatto	
2008 (20th)	Motel	
2009 (21st)	Juanes‡	
2009 (21st)	Black Guayaba	
2009 (21st)	Café Tacuba	
2009 (21st)	Maná	
2009 (21st)	Motel	
2010 (22nd)	Juanes‡	
2010 (22nd)	Beto Cuevas	
2010 (22nd)	Maná	
2010 (22nd)	Motel	
2010 (22nd)	La Secta AllStar	
2011 (23rd)	Juanes‡	
2011 (23rd)	Bunbury	
2011 (23rd)	El Canto del Loco	
2011 (23rd)	Draco	
2011 (23rd)	Vivanativa	
2012 (24th)	Maná‡	
2012 (24th)	Juanes	
2012 (24th)	Alejandra Guzmán	
2012 (24th)	Zoé	
2013 (25th)	Maná‡	
2013 (25th)	Beto Cuevas	
2013 (25th)	Alejandra Guzmán	
2013 (25th)	Juanes	

== See also ==
- Grammy Award for Best Latin Pop, Rock or Urban Album
- Grammy Award for Best Latin Rock, Urban or Alternative Album
- Latin Grammy Award for Best Alternative Music Album
- Latin Grammy Award for Best Rock Album
