= Lo Nuestro Award for Tropical Contemporary Artist of the Year =

Latin music award

- Awarded for: Best Tropical Contemporary Performance
- Country: United States
- Presented by: Univision
- First award: 2001
- Currently held by: Prince Royce (2014)

Highlights
- Most awards: Aventura (6)
- Most nominations: Aventura (8)
- Website: univision.com/premiolonuestro

The Lo Nuestro Award for Tropical Traditional Performance is an honor presented annually by American network Univision. The Lo Nuestro Awards were first awarded in 1989 and has been given annually since to recognize the most talented performers of Latin music. The nominees and winners were originally selected by a voting poll conducted among program directors of Spanish-language radio stations in the United States and also based on chart performance on Billboard Latin music charts, with the results being tabulated and certified by the accounting firm Deloitte. At the present time, the winners are selected by the audience through an online survey. The trophy awarded is shaped in the form of a treble clef. The award name was changed in 2013 to Lo Nuestro Award for Tropical Contemporary Artist of the Year.

The award was first presented to Colombian singer-songwriter Carlos Vives in 2001. American band Aventura holds the record for the most awards with six, and most nominations with eight. Dominican singer Andy Andy and Colombian performer Fonseca are the most nominated performer without a win, with four unsuccessful nominations each.

== Winners and nominees ==
Listed below are the winners and nominees of the award for each year.

Key	Meaning
‡	Indicates the winner

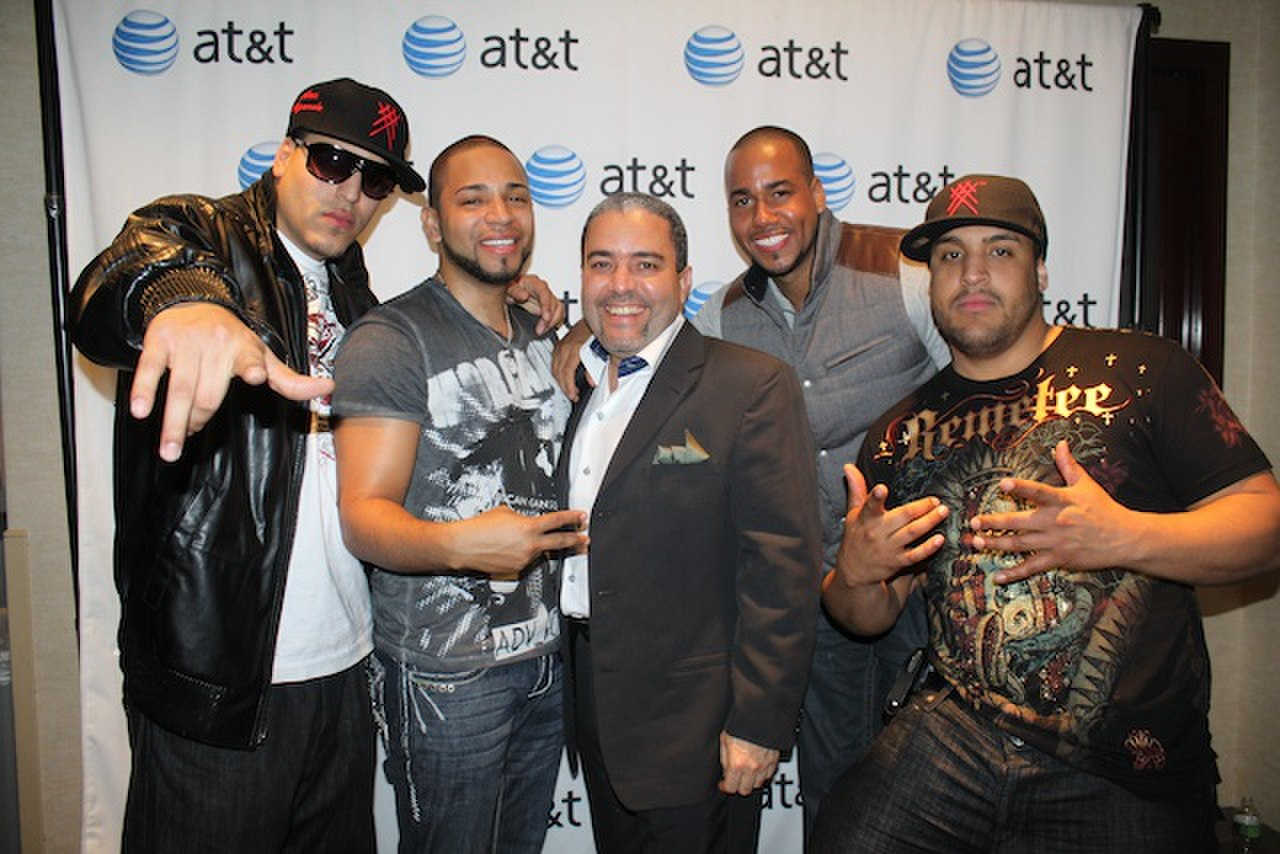
American band Aventura, six-time winners

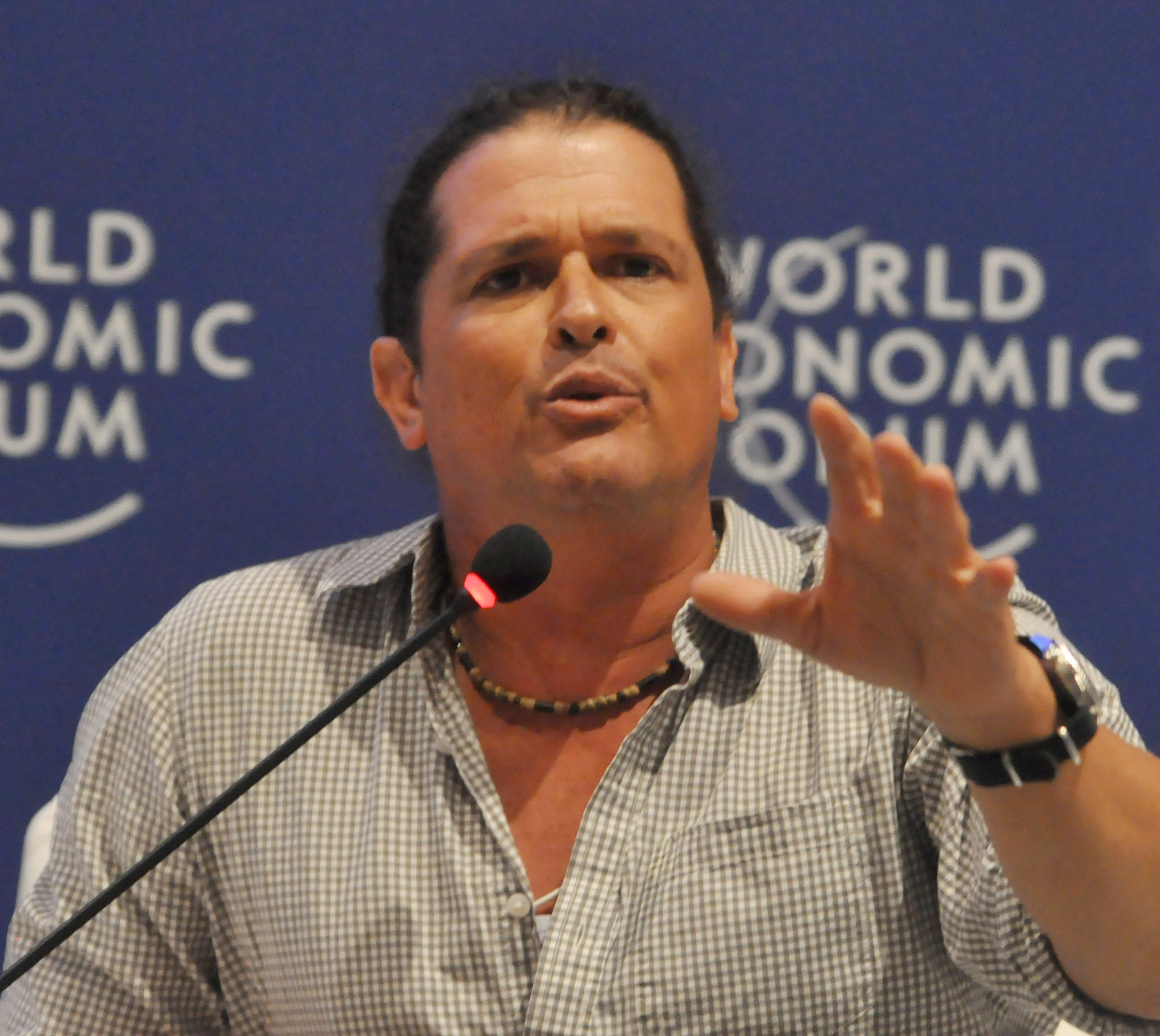
Colombian performer Carlos Vives (pictured in 2010), five-time nominee and winner in 2001 and 2005

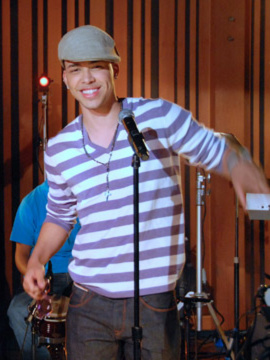
American singer Prince Royce (pictured in 2012), winner in 2012 and 2013

Year	Performer	Ref
2001 (13th)	Carlos Vives‡	
2001 (13th)	Banda Blanca	
2001 (13th)	Alex Bueno	
2001 (13th)	Gloria Estefan	
2001 (13th)	Sonora Tropicana	
2002 (14th)	Alquimia‡	
2002 (14th)	Antony Santos	
2002 (14th)	Frank Reyes	
2002 (14th)	Luis Vargas	
2003 (15th)	Celso Piña y su Ronda Bogotá‡	
2003 (15th)	Monchy & Alexandra	
2003 (15th)	Fito Olivares	
2003 (15th)	Carlos Vives	
2004 (16th)	Monchy & Alexandra‡	
2004 (16th)	Aventura	
2004 (16th)	Elvis Martínez	
2004 (16th)	Nueva Era	
2005 (17th)	Carlos Vives‡	
2005 (17th)	Andy Andy	
2005 (17th)	Aventura	
2005 (17th)	Elvis Martínez	
2006 (18th)	Aventura‡	
2006 (18th)	Andy Andy	
2006 (18th)	Monchy & Alexandra	
2006 (18th)	Carlos Vives	
2007 (19th)	Aventura‡	
2007 (19th)	Andy Andy	
2007 (19th)	Fonseca	
2007 (19th)	Monchy & Alexandra	
2008 (20th)	Aventura‡	
2008 (20th)	Fanny Lú	
2008 (20th)	Fonseca	
2008 (20th)	Xtreme	
2009 (21st)	Aventura‡	
2009 (21st)	Héctor Acosta	
2009 (21st)	Andy Andy	
2009 (21st)	Fonseca	
2009 (21st)	Frank Reyes	
2010 (22nd)	Aventura‡	
2010 (22nd)	Héctor Acosta	
2010 (22nd)	Jorge Celedón and Jimmy Zambrano	
2010 (22nd)	Fonseca	
2010 (22nd)	Domenic Marte	
2011 (23rd)	Aventura‡	
2011 (23rd)	Héctor Acosta	
2011 (23rd)	Carlos & Alejandra	
2011 (23rd)	Prince Royce	
2012 (24th)	Prince Royce‡	
2012 (24th)	Juan Luis Guerra	
2012 (24th)	Romeo Santos	
2012 (24th)	Tito El Bambino	
2013 (25th)	Prince Royce‡	
2013 (25th)	Chino & Nacho	
2013 (25th)	Romeo Santos	
2013 (25th)	Tito El Bambino	
2014 (26th)	Prince Royce	
2014 (26th)	Chino & Nacho	
2014 (26th)	Romeo Santos	
2014 (26th)	Carlos Vives	
2015 (27th)	TBA	
2015 (27th)	Chino & Nacho	
2015 (27th)	Prince Royce	
2015 (27th)	Romeo Santos	
2015 (27th)	Carlos Vives	

== Multiple wins/nominations ==
Number	Performer(s)
Wins
6	Aventura
3	Prince Royce
2	Carlos Vives
Nominations
8	Aventura
6	Carlos Vives
5	Prince Royce
4	Andy Andy
4	Fonseca
4	Monchy & Alexandra
4	Prince Royce
4	Romeo Santos
3	Chino & Nacho
3	Héctor Acosta
3	Tito El Bambino
2	Elvis Martínez
2	Frank Reyes

== See also ==
- Grammy Award for Best Traditional Tropical Latin Album
- Latin Grammy Award for Best Contemporary Tropical Album
