= List of awards and nominations received by Bobby Pulido =

Bobby Pulido awards and nominations
Awards and nominations
Award	Wins	Nominations
Lo Nuestro Awards	0	1
Latin Grammy Awards	2	5
Fiestas Mexico	1	1
Tejano Music Awards	1	3
Lo Nuestro Awards	8	22

Totals (Note: Certain award groups do not simply award one winner. They acknowledge several different recipients, have runners-up, and have third place. Since this is a specific recognition and is different from losing an award, runner-up mentions are considered wins in this award tally. For simplification and to avoid errors, each award in this list has been presumed to have had a prior nomination.)
- Wins: 12
- Nominations: 32

Bobby Pulido is an American Tejano music singer who has won 12 awards against 32 nominations.

== Awards and nominations ==
=== Lo Nuestro ===
Pulido was nominated for one award.

Year	Nominee / work	Award	Result
1997	Bobby Pulido	Regional Mexican New Artist of the Year	Nominated

=== Latin Grammy Awards ===
Year	Nominee / work	Award	Result
2000	El Cazador	Best Tejano Album	Nominated
2004	Móntame	Best Tejano Album	Nominated
2005	Vive	Best Tejano Album	Nominated
2022	Para Que Baile Mi Pueblo	Best Tejano Album	Won
2025	Bobby Pulido & Friends Una Tuya y Una Mía (Vol. 1/En Vivo)	Best Tejano Album	Won
2026	Bobby Pulido & Friends Una Tuya y Una Mía (Vol. 2/En Vivo)	Best Tejano Album	Won

=== Fiestas Mexican Awards ===
Pulido became the youngest recipient to win an Orgullo de la Frontera award in 1999.

Year	Nominee / work	Award	Result
1999	Bobby Pulido	Orgullo de la Frontera	Won

=== Tejano Music Awards ===
Nominated for 22, Pulido won eight Tejano Music Awards, which are awarded annually in San Antonio, Texas, honoring Tejano acts.

Year	Nominee / work	Award	Result
1996	Bobby Pulido	Most Promising Band	Nominated
1997	Bobby Pulido	Male Entertainer of the Year	Nominated
1997	Bobby Pulido	Most Promising Band	Won
1997	Bobby Pulido and Roberto Pulido	Vocal Duo of the Year	Nominated
1998	Bobby Pulido	Male Vocalist of the Year	Won
1998	Bobby Pulido	Male Entertainer of the Year	Won
1998	Llegaste A Me Vida	Album of the Year – Group	Won
1998	Bobby Pulido	Crossover of the Year	Won
1998	Bobby Pulido	Music Video of the Year	Won
1999	Bobby Pulido	Male Vocalist of the Year	Nominated
1999	Bobby Pulido	Male Entertainer of the Year	Won
1999	"Que Mas Te Puede Dar"	Tejano Crossover Song of the Year	Nominated
2000	Bobby Pulido	Male Entertainer of the Year	Won
2002	Bobby Pulido	Male Vocalist of the Year	Nominated
2003	Bobby Pulido	Male Vocalist of the Year	Nominated
2003	"Vanidosa"	Song of the Year	Nominated
2003	Bobby	Tejano Album of the Year	Nominated
2004	"Vanidosa"	Tejano Crossover Song of the Year	Nominated
2011	Bobby Pulido	Male Vocalist of the Year	Nominated
2011	Bobby Pulido	Entertainer of the Year	Nominated
2011	"Dias de Ayer"	Song of the Year	Nominated
2014	Bobby Pulido	Male Vocalist of the Year	Nominated
