= Lo Nuestro Award for Tropical New Artist of the Year =

Latin music award

- Awarded for: Tropical New Artist of the Year
- Country: United States
- Presented by: Univision
- First award: 1989
- Final award: 2014
- Website: univision.com/premiolonuestro

The Lo Nuestro Award for Tropical/Salsa New Artist of the Year is an honor presented annually by American network Univision. It was first awarded in 1989 and has been given annually since to recognize the most talented performers of Latin music. The nominees and winners were originally selected by a voting poll conducted among program directors of Spanish-language radio stations in the United States and also based on chart performance on Billboard Latin music charts, with the results being tabulated and certified by the accounting firm Deloitte. At the present time, the winners are selected by the audience through an online survey. The trophy awarded is shaped in the form of a treble clef.

The award was first presented to Nicaraguan singer Luis Enrique. Puerto-Rican American performer Olga Tañón was a nominee in 1993 and eventually became the most awarded performer in Lo Nuestro Awards history, with 22 accolades. American singer Marc Anthony won the following year and also received the Grammy Award for Best Tropical Latin Performance for the album Contra la Corriente in 1998. Puerto-Rican American artist Elvis Crespo earned the award in 1999, the same year that his songs "Suavemente" and "Tu Sonrisa" peaked at number-one at the Billboard Latin Songs chart. At the 12th Lo Nuestro Awards, Son by Four was named Tropical New Artist of the Year aided by the massive success of their single "A Puro Dolor", which later ranked 1st at the Hot Latin Songs 25th Anniversary chart. Colombian singer-songwriter Fonseca won in 2007 and also earned the Latin Grammy Award for Best Tropical Song. In 2013, the Pop, Regional Mexican and Tropical/Salsa New Artist of the Year categories were merged on a Lo Nuestro Award for Best New Artist category in the General Field; however, the following year, the Lo Nuestro Award for Tropical New Artist of the Year was reincorporated.

== Winners and nominees ==
Listed below are the winners of the award for each year, as well as the other nominees for the majority of the years awarded.

| Key | Meaning |
|---|---|
| ‡ | Indicates the winner |

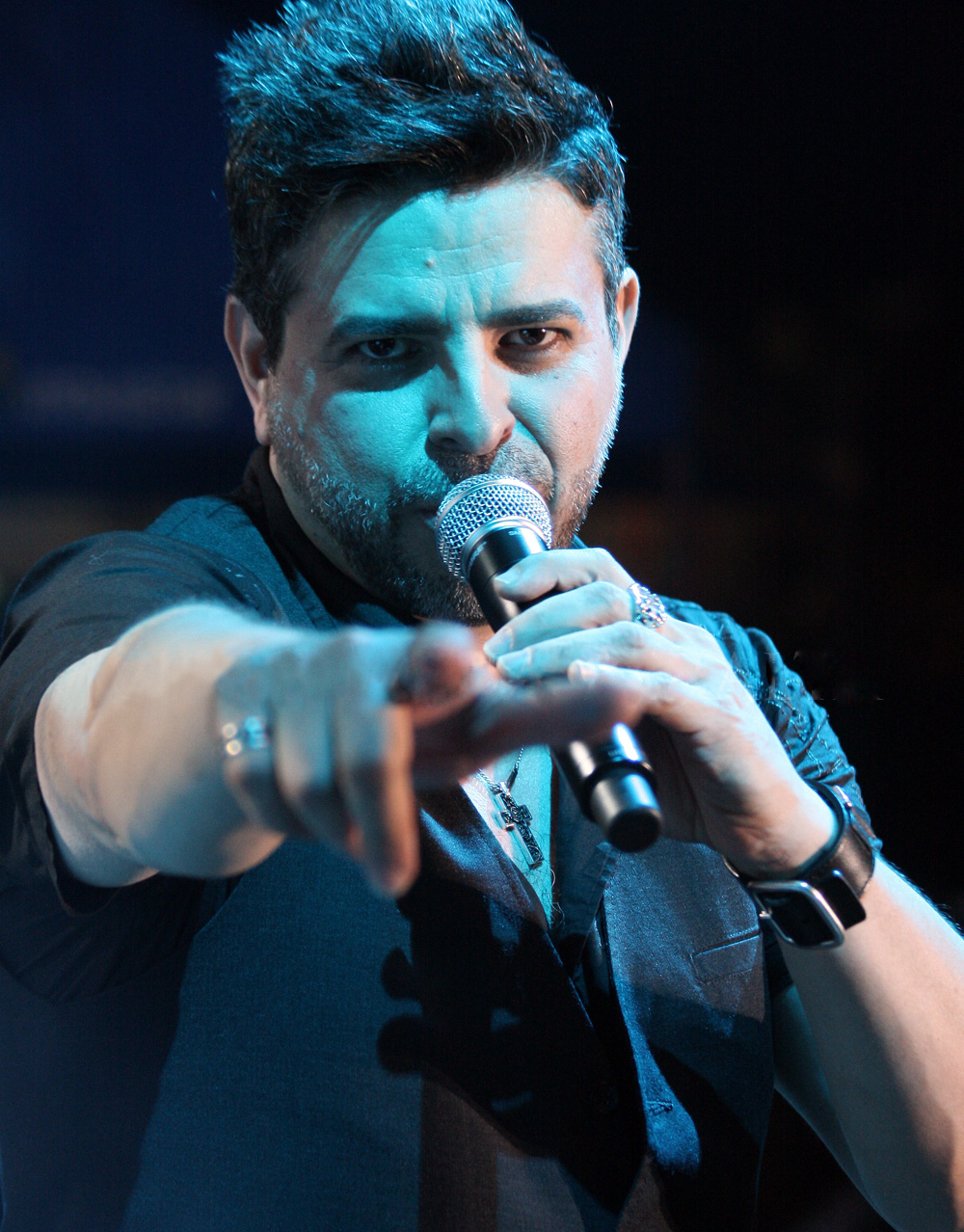
Nicaraguan performer Luis Enrique (pictured in 2010), the first winner

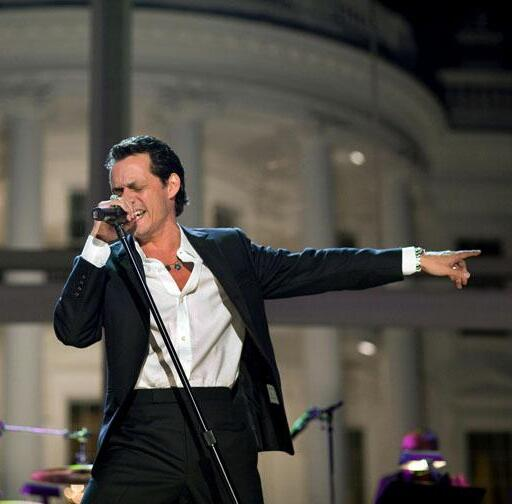
American singer Marc Anthony (pictured in 2009), winner in 1994

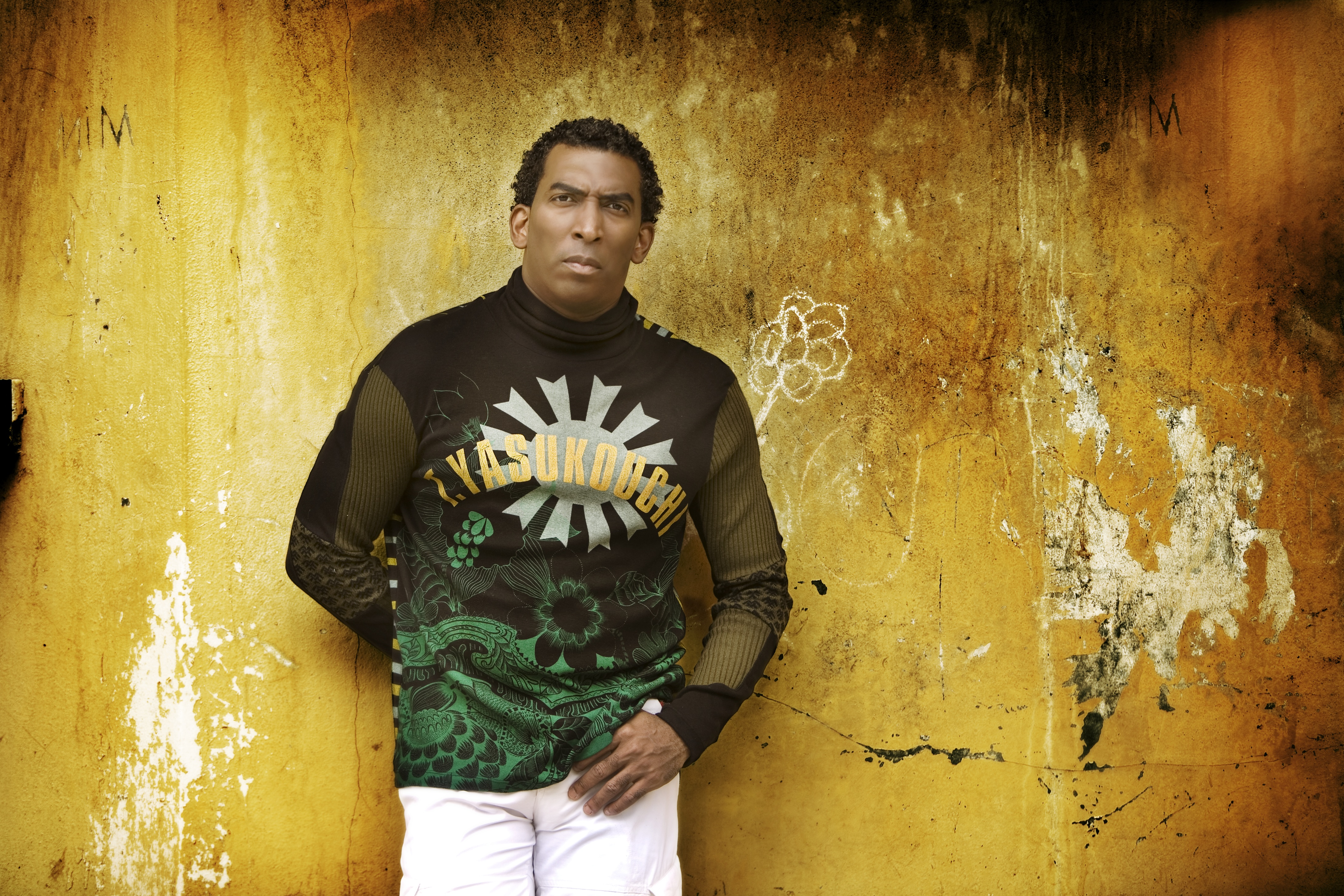
Dominican singer Chichi Peralta (pictured in 2010), winner in 1998

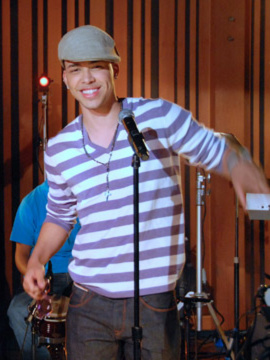
American singer Prince Royce (pictured in 2012), winner in 2012

| Year | Performer | Ref |
|---|---|---|
| 1989 (1st) | Luis Enrique‡ | |
| 1989 (1st) | Willie González | |
| 1989 (1st) | Lalo Rodríguez | |
| 1989 (1st) | Max Torres | |
| 1990 (2nd) | Chantelle‡ | |
| 1990 (2nd) | Hansel | |
| 1990 (2nd) | David Pabon | |
| 1990 (2nd) | Tony Vega | |
| 1990 (2nd) | Viti Ruiz | |
| 1991 (3rd) | Banda Blanca‡ | |
| 1991 (3rd) | Angel Javier | |
| 1991 (3rd) | Orquesta de la Luz | |
| 1991 (3rd) | Jerry Rivera | |
| 1992 (4th) | Víctor Víctor‡ | |
| 1992 (4th) | Antonio Cruz | |
| 1992 (4th) | Alex D'Castro | |
| 1992 (4th) | Xavier | |
| 1993 (5th) | Rey Ruiz‡ | |
| 1993 (5th) | Caña Brava | |
| 1993 (5th) | Olga Tañón | |
| 1993 (5th) | Zona Roja | |
| 1994 (6th) | Marc Anthony‡ | |
| 1995 (7th) | Giro‡ | |
| 1996 (8th) | Ilegales‡ | |
| 1996 (8th) | Jailene Cintrón | |
| 1996 (8th) | Manny Manuel | |
| 1996 (8th) | Mayra Mayra | |
| 1997 (9th) | Grupo Manía‡ | |
| 1997 (9th) | Luis Damón | |
| 1997 (9th) | DLG | |
| 1997 (9th) | La Makina | |
| 1998 (10th) | Chichi Peralta and Son Familia‡ | |
| 1998 (10th) | Alquimia y los Adolescentes | |
| 1998 (10th) | Michael Stuart | |
| 1999 (11th) | Elvis Crespo‡ | |
| 1999 (11th) | Charlie Cardona | |
| 1999 (11th) | Fulanito | |
| 1999 (11th) | Servando & Florentino | |
| 2000 (12th) | Son by Four‡ | |
| 2001 (13th) | Kevin Ceballo‡ | |
| 2001 (13th) | Inocentes MC | |
| 2001 (13th) | Los Hidalgo | |
| 2001 (13th) | Vanessa | |
| 2002 (14th) | Huey Dunbar‡ | |
| 2002 (14th) | Jay Lozada | |
| 2002 (14th) | Ricardo y Alberto | |
| 2002 (14th) | Zona Prieta | |
| 2003 (15th) | Proyecto Nuevo‡ | |
| 2003 (15th) | Doble Filo | |
| 2003 (15th) | Rafy Burgos "El Cupido" | |
| 2004 (16th) | Son de Cali‡ | |
| 2004 (16th) | Daniel | |
| 2004 (16th) | Puerto Raíces | |
| 2004 (16th) | Seaxappeal | |
| 2004 (16th) | Son Callejero | |
| 2005 (17th) | Luna Llena‡ | |
| 2005 (17th) | Domenic Marte | |
| 2005 (17th) | El Florido Flores | |
| 2005 (17th) | N'Klabe | |
| 2006 (18th) | Xtreme‡ | |
| 2006 (18th) | Ciclón | |
| 2006 (18th) | Edgar Daniel | |
| 2006 (18th) | T4 | |
| 2007 (19th) | Fonseca‡ | |
| 2007 (19th) | Orlando Conga | |
| 2007 (19th) | Marlon | |
| 2010 (22nd) | Carlos & Alejandra‡ | |
| 2010 (22nd) | Grupo Rush | |
| 2010 (22nd) | Indio | |
| 2010 (22nd) | Marcy Place | |
| 2010 (22nd) | Rafely Rosario | |
| 2011 (23rd) | Prince Royce‡ | |
| 2011 (23rd) | Bachata Heightz | |
| 2011 (23rd) | J'Martin | |
| 2011 (23rd) | La Morena | |
| 2011 (23rd) | Los Aviadores | |
| 2012 (24th) | Monchy & Nathalia‡ | |
| 2012 (24th) | A & C | |
| 2012 (24th) | Yunel Cruz | |
| 2012 (24th) | Loisaidas | |
| 2014 (26th) | Alex Matos | |
| 2014 (26th) | Benavides | |
| 2014 (26th) | Juan Esteban | |

== See also ==
- Latin Grammy Award for Best New Artist
