= Premio Lo Nuestro 2003 =

Latin Music awards show

15th Lo Nuestro Awards
- Date: Thursday, February 6, 2003
- Site: James L. Knight Center, Miami, Florida, USA
- Hosted by: Marco Antonio Regil; Adal Ramones

Highlights
- Most awards: Celia Cruz (4)
- Most nominations: Celia Cruz (4)

Premio Lo Nuestro 2003 was the 15th anniversary of the awards. the show was hosted by Mexican presenters Marco Antonio Regil and Adal Ramones. Juanes, Thalía, Marc Anthony, Pilar Montenegro, Sin Bandera, Banda el Recodo and other Latin music greats gave electrifying performances. In the show, there was 36 awards winners with 135 nominations. In Pop genre, Awards was given for : Album of the Year, Best Male Artist, Best Female Artist, Best Group or duo, Best New Artist and Song of the Year. In Rock Genre : Best Rock Album and Best rock Performer of the Year. In Tropical genre : Best Tropical Album of the Year, Best Tropical Male Artist, Best Tropical Female Artist, Best Tropical Group or Duo of the Year, Best Tropical New Artist, Tropical Song of the Year, Best Merengue Performance, Best Salsa Performance and Best Traditional Performance. Juanes was the biggest winner of night, took home four awards Best Pop Male Artist, Best Music Video, Best Rock Performance, and Pop Song of the Year . In the Regional Mexican, Pilar Montenegro took three awards for Regional Mexican Song of the Year, Pop Song of the Year ("Quitame Ese Hombre"), and for Best Regional Mexican Female Artist. In the tropical genre, Celia Cruz took home with four great awards of the night for Best Salsa Performance, Best Tropical Female Artist, Best Tropical Song of the year and Tropical Album of the Year. At the night, the greatest performance was a medley of top Latin hits from the last 15 years, performed by the artists that made them famous, including Vikki Carr, Son by Four, Los Ilegales, La Mafia, Luis Enrique, Wilfrido Vargas and Olga Tañón. There was a great tribute to Celia Cruz by the world-famous salsa group "Fania All-Stars", of which Cruz was a member during the 1970s, reunited for an exclusive performance that rocked the house.

== Appearances ==
- Alejandra Guzmán
- Alejandro Montaner
- Alicia Machado
- Arath de la Torre
- Cynthia Klitbo
- Edith González
- Erika Buenfil
- Jennifer Peña
- Jon Secada
- Jorge Aravena
- Maribel Guardia
- Roselyn Sánchez
- Saúl Lisazo
- Scarlet Ortiz
- Sofía Vergara
- Valentino Lanús

== Performances ==
- Banda el Recodo
- Fania All-Stars
- Juanes
- Marc Anthony
- Pilar Montenegro
- Sin Bandera
- Thalía
- Medley Performance performers:
  - Vikki Carr
  - Son by Four
  - Los Ilegales
  - La Mafia
  - Luis Enrique
  - Wilfrido Vargas
  - Olga Tañón

== Nominees and winners ==
Pop Album	Pop Song
Sin Bandera – Sin Bandera; Las Ketchup – Hijas del Tomate; Alejandro Sanz – MTV Unplugged; Enrique Iglesias – Quizás; Thalía – Thalía	Juanes – "A Dios le Pido" and Pilar Montenegro – "Quitame Ese Hombre"; Sin Bandera – "Entra en Mi Vida"; Shakira – "Suerte"; Chayanne – "Y Tú Te Vas"
Pop Male Artist	Pop Female Artist
Juanes; Chayanne; Cristian; Enrique Iglesias; Luis Miguel	Shakira; Alejandra Guzmán; Pilar Montenegro; Laura Pausini; Jennifer Peña; Thalía
Pop Group or Duo	Pop New Artist
Sin Bandera; Kabah; Las Ketchup; OV7	Las Ketchup; Alejandro Montaner; Area 305; Sin Bandera
Rock Album	Rock Artist
Maná – Revolución de Amor; Cabas – Buenos Muchachos - La Mosca Tsé Tsé Cabas; Los Rabanes – Money Pa' Qué; Juanes – Un Día Normal	Juanes; Cabas; Maná; Los Rabanes
Urban Album	Urban Artist
El General– Is Back; Proyecto Uno– Pura Gozadera; Vico C– Emboscada; Big Boy – Emboscada; Sindicato Argentino del Hip Hop – Un Paso a la Eternidad	El General; Big Boy; Proyecto Uno; Vico C
Regional Mexican Album	Regional Mexican Song
Conjunto Primavera – Perdóname Mi Amor; Liberación – Ahora y Siempre; Lupillo Rivera – Amorcito Corazón; Tucanes de Tijuana – Juego a la Vida; Intocable – Sueños	Pilar Montenegro – "Quitame Ese Hombre"; Germán Lizárraga and su Banda Estrellas de Sinaloa – "Estoy Sufriendo"; Banda el Recodo – "No Me Se Rajar"; Conjunto Primavera – "Perdóname Mi Amor"; Alberto and Roberto – "Tu Forma de Ser"
Regional Mexican Male Artist	Regional Mexican Female Artist
Joan Sebastian; Lupillo Rivera; Marco Antonio Solís; Pedro Fernández	Pilar Montenegro; Aracely Arámbula; Jenni Rivera; Paquita la del Barrio
Regional Mexican Group or Duo	Regional Mexican New Artist
Intocable; Alberto and Roberto; Banda el Recodo; Conjunto Primavera; Germán Lizárraga and su Banda Estrellas de Sinaloa	Germán Lizárraga and su Banda Estrellas de Sinaloa; Adolfo Urías y su Lobo Norteño; Aracely Arámbula; Aroma
Tejano Performance	Grupero Performance
Intocable; Jimmy González and el Grupo Mazz; Los Palominos; Control; Bobby Pulido	Los Temerarios; Alberto and Roberto; Liberación; Joan Sebastian
Ranchero Performance	Banda Performance
Vicente Fernández; Pablo Montero; Paquita la del Barrio; Pedro Fernández	Banda el Recodo; El Coyote and su Banda Tierra Santa; Germán Lizárraga and su Banda Estrellas de Sinaloa; Lupillo Rivera; Rogelio Martínez
Norteño Performance
Conjunto Primavera; El Poder del Norte; Los Tigres del Norte; Ramón Ayala y sus Bravos del Norte
Tropical Album	Tropical Song
Celia Cruz – La Negra Tiene Tumbao; Celso Piña and su Ronda Bogotá – A Bailar Cumbia; Monchy & Alexandra – Confesiones; Carlos Vives – Déjame Entrar; Marc Anthony – Libre	Celia Cruz – "La Vida es un Carnaval"; Celso Piña and su Ronda Bogotá – "Cumba Sobre el Río"; Celia Cruz – "La Negra Tiene Tumbao"; Marc Anthony – "Viviendo"
Tropical Male Artist	Tropical Female Artist
Marc Anthony; Carlos Vives; Elvis Crespo; Gilberto Santa Rosa	Celia Cruz; Brenda K. Starr; Susana Baca; Milly Quezada
Merengue Artist	Salsa Artist
Elvis Crespo; Ilegales; Fulanito; Oro Solido	Celia Cruz; El Gran Combo de Puerto Rico; Gilberto Santa Rosa; Marc Anthony
Tropical Duo or Group	Tropical New Artist
Celso Piña and su Ronda Bogotá; Fulanito; Ilegales; Monchy & Alexandra	Proyecto Nuevo; Dooble Fiilo; Rafy Burgos "El Cupido"
Traditional Performance	Video of the Year
Celso Piña and su Ronda Bogotá; Carlos Vives; Fito Olivares; Monchy & Alexandra	Juanes – "A Dios le Pido" (dir. Gustavo Garzón); Maná – "Ángel de Amor" (dir. Marlene Rodriguez); Carlos Vives – "Carito" (dir. Oscar Azul); Pablo Montero – "Hay Otra en Tu Lugar" (dir. Martin White Eagle); Cristian – "Lloviendo Estrellas" (dir. Paolo Scarfo); Enrique Iglesias – "Mentiroso" (dir. Simon Brand); Jorge Moreno – "Mi Sufrimiento" (dir. Jorge Moreno); Paulina Rubio – "Si Tú Te Vas" (banda version) (dir. Wayne Isham); Cabas – "Tu Boca" (dir. Felipe Dothee-Cigoto); Jerry Rivera – "Vuela Muy Alto" (dir. Marcelo Paez)

== Special awards ==
- Lo Nuestro Excellence Award: Luis Miguel
- People's Choice:
  - Pop: Thalía
  - Rock: Shakira
  - Tropical: Marc Anthony
  - Regional/Mexican: Vicente Fernández
  - Urban: El General
