= Desvelado =

Desvelado ("sleepless") may refer to

- Desvelado (Bobby Pulido album), 1995
- Desvelado (Eslabon Armado album), 2023
