= Sotelúm =

Mexican musician

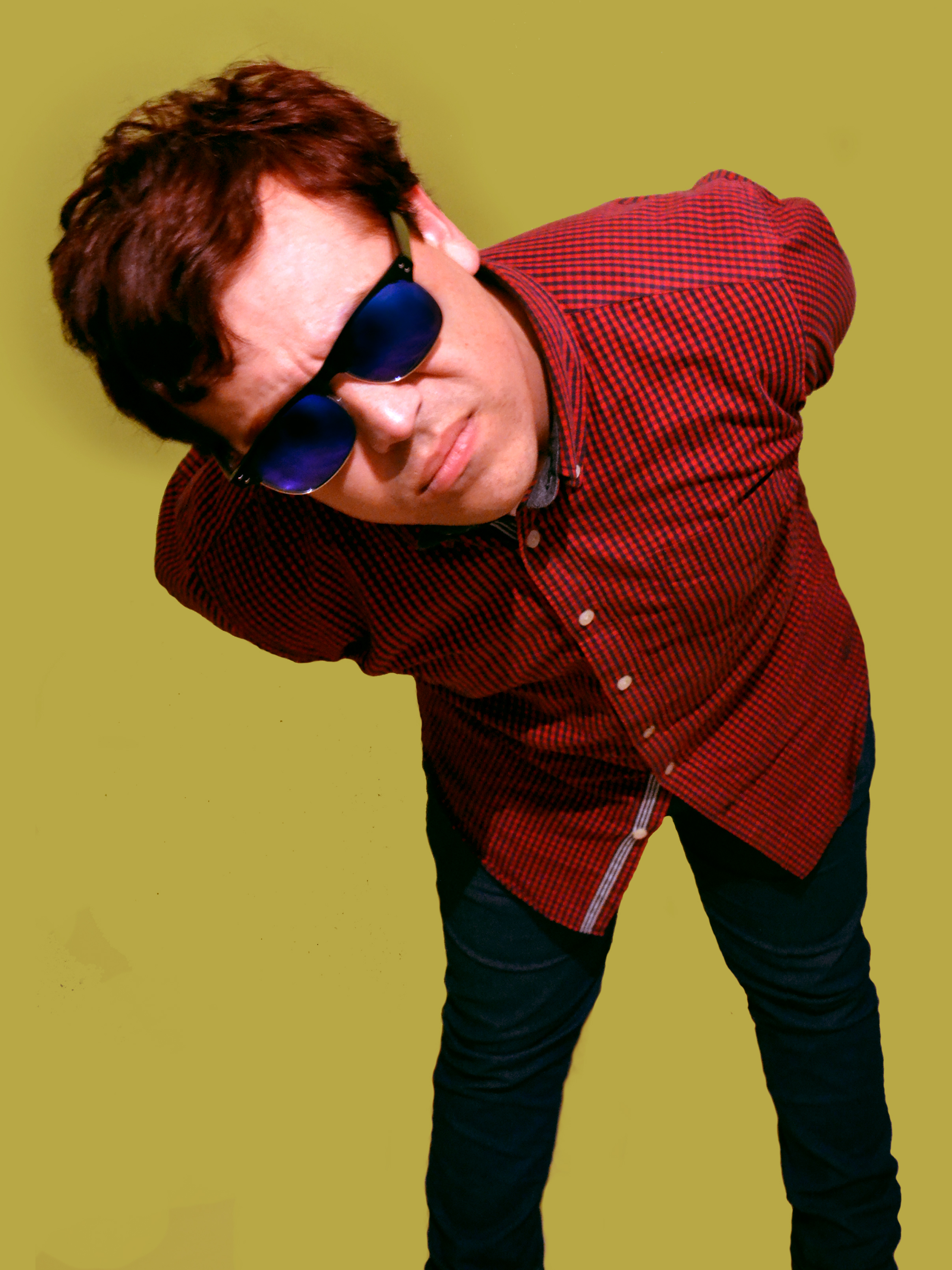
- Sotelúm's 2015 promotional photo

Background information
- Also known as: שלוּם סוטלו
- Born: Jorge Sotelo; December 1, 1989 (age 35); Tijuana, Mexico
- Origin: Sephardic
- Genres: Synth; folk
- Occupation(s): Music producer, musician, songwriter
- Instrument(s): Synthesizer, trumpet
- Years active: 2006–present
- Labels: Share The Light Music
- Website: www.sotelum.com

Sotelúm (Shlúm «Lúm» Sotelo Hebrew: שלוּם; born December 1, 1989) is a modernist and independent music artist, listed by UABC Radio and other local press media as an elemental post-nortec visionary in the Mexican avant garde of electronic music.

== Career ==
From his early experiences as trumpet player, Sotelúm always expressed his affinity for Mexican folklore and Hebrew music, especially sephardic brass and klezmer styles. His music career began professionally in 2006 when he joined a mariachi street band on the world-famous Santa Cecilia square, where he practiced the Mexican music tradition, unnoticed until 2008.

From 2008 Sotelúm performed live in many projects including Nortec Panoptica Orchestra, Pato Banton & The Ghostownians and Sotelúm & The Minarete Brass Orchestra (his own production).

In early 2010, with the help of Pato Banton, Sotelúm founded Share The Light Music and launch his first studio LP; Minarete Brass an album that mixed Mexican folk music from the huasteca and tapatia regions with American standard styles like swing and jazz, clearly influenced by Herb Alpert & The Tijuana Brass.

During Hanukkah 2011, Sotelúm released his first formal approach to electronic music with the exposure of his first studio EP; Synthetiklezmer a bold and experimental fusion between sephardic brass and klezmer with the drum machines and synthesizers that introduced him to the EDM scene. The EP counted with the special collaboration of Gustavo Bulgach, Argentine-American clarinetist and bandleader of Klezmer Juice and Yiddish Tango Club.

In 2012, and after continuous collaborations with Big Javy from Inspector and Sonidero Travesura, Sotelúm released his second studio EP Huastech, a craft that mixed folk and electronic music heard in Synthetiklezmer, but this time with Mexican styles like mariachi and huasteca music. This material was produced and released in Guadalajara Mexico and many samples from Minarete Brass can be heard.

In 2013, Sotelúm launched his third studio EP Share The Light, that exposes the same synth/folk previous proffers, but incorporating his own vocals and voice participations of the Mexican singer Linda Owlen and the Peruvian-Israeli singer Einat Schmal.

In 2014, Sotelúm launched an eponymous compilation LP, Sotelúm.

== Discography ==
=== LPs ===
- Minarete Brass (2010)
- Sotelúm (2014)

=== EPs ===
- Synthetiklezmer (2011)
- Huastech (2012)
- Share the Light (2013)
