= Rafely Rosario =

Dominican singer (born 1986)

Rafely Rosario (born 8 September 1986 in Santo Domingo) is a Dominican singer. In 2010, Rosario was nominated for a Lo Nuestro Award for Tropical New Artist of the Year.
