= Circo (band) =

Puerto Rico band formed in 2001

- Origin: San Juan, Puerto Rico
- Genres: Alternative rock, new wave, indie, eclectic, electroacoustic, Latin
- Years active: 2001–present
- Labels: Sony/BMG; Universal Latino; Universal
- Members: Jose Luis "Fofé" Abreu; Edgardo "Egui" Santiago; José David Pérez; Orlando Méndez
- Past members: Nicolás Cordero

Circo is a band from Puerto Rico which formed in 2001. Its members are Jose Luis "Fofé" Abreu (vocals), Edgardo "Egui" Santiago (keyboards), José David Pérez (drums, vibes), Nicolás Cordero (bass)(Nico is no longer with the band), and Orlando Méndez (guitar). The band was nominated for Rock New Artist at the 16th Lo Nuestro Awards, losing to Mexican singer Alessandra Rosaldo. They also have been nominated for various Latin Grammy Awards in Latin Grammy Awards of 2002, Latin Grammy Awards of 2005 and Latin Grammy Awards of 2008.

== Discography ==
- No Todo lo que es Pop es Bueno (2001)
- No Todo lo que es Pop es Bueno (Special 2 disc edition) (2003)
- En el Cielo de tu Boca (2005)
- Cursi (2007)
- Adiós, Hola (2020)
- Morir En Reversa (2026)

== See also ==
- Puerto Rican rock
