= Lo Nuestro Award for Rock New Artist of the Year =

Latin music award

Lo Nuestro Awards for New Rock Artist of the Year
- Country: United States
- Presented by: Univision
- First award: 2004
- Final award: 2004
- Website: univision.com/premiolonuestro

The Lo Nuestro Award for New Rock Artist of the Year is an honor presented annually by American network Univision. The Lo Nuestro Awards have been held since 1989 to recognize the most talented performers of Latin music. The nominees and winners were originally selected by a voting poll conducted among program directors of Spanish-language radio stations in the United States and also based on chart performance on Billboard Latin music charts, with the results tabulated and certified by the accounting firm Arthur Andersen. Starting from 2004, the winners are selected by the audience through an online survey. The trophy is shaped in the form of a treble clef.

The award was first presented in every field awarded on the Lo Nuestro Awards: Pop, Tropical, Regional Mexican and, for one time only, Rock/Alternative; In 2004, the nominees included Puerto-Rican ensemble Circo, Mexican group Inspector, Spanish R&B trio Las Niñas, Argentinian band La Zurda, and Mexican solo singers Jorge Correa, Natalia Lafourcade, and Alessandra Rosaldo; with Rosaldo receiving the award.

== Winners and nominees ==
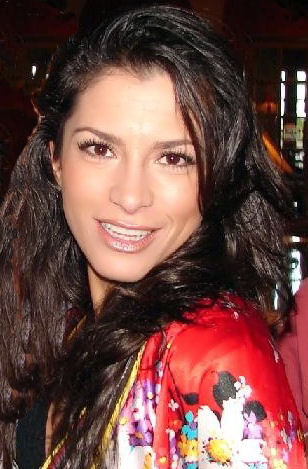
Mexican singer Alessandra Rosaldo (pictured in 2006), winner in 2004

Listed below are the winners of the award for each year, as well as the other nominees.

Key	Meaning
‡	Indicates the winning artist

Year	Performer(s)	Ref
2004 (16th)	Alessandra Rosaldo‡	
2004 (16th)	Circo	
2004 (16th)	Jorge Correa	
2004 (16th)	Inspector	
2004 (16th)	La Zurda	
2004 (16th)	Las Niñas	
2004 (16th)	Natalia Lafourcade	

== See also ==
- Grammy Award for Best New Artist
- Latin Grammy Award for Best New Artist
