= Minarete Brass =

Studio album by Sotelúm
- Released: October 20, 2010
- Recorded: 2009–2010
- Genre: Mod Jazz; Neo-Swing; Son Huasteco; Mariachi
- Length: 28:00
- Label: Share The Light Music
- Producer: Sotelúm

Minarete Brass was the first LP release by the Mexican producer and recording artist Sotelúm. Considered by some Nortec Collective members as one of the most purposeful pieces of art in Tijuana. This album is the result of Sotelúm's concerns to amalgamate modern jazz with mariachi and mexican folk music from the huasteca and tapatia regions of Mexico. The music from this album is performed by Sotelúm & The Minarete Brass Orchestra, a live sub-project band specially grouped for live shows that has been described as "regional pride" by the IMAC and ICBC public institutions of culture.
