= Sonidero Travesura =

- Also known as: "El Tigre Digital"
- Origin: Tijuana, Mexico
- Genres: Synthpop, Latin
- Years active: 2007–present
- Labels: V.I.C.I.O
- Members: Dardin Coria; Omar Lizarraga

Sonidero Travesura is a Latin-synth duo from Tijuana, Mexico. The name roughly translates to "playful" or "mischievous sound system" and uses cumbia sonidera culture as an inspirational starting point.

== Musical career ==
The group, active since 2007 is an elemental member of "La Súper Cumbia Futuristica" collective, the two central members are synthesist Dardin Coria and drummer Omar Lizarraga, also known as forming members of Casa Wagner. The Latin flavor of the self-claimed "Tigre Digital" style, now incorporates an assortment of instruments from organs and electric guitar to accordions and brass, usually rounding out their live shows with musical guests ranging from DJs like Dj Chucuchu to trumpet players like Sotelúm.

== Discography ==
- Greatest Hits (2012) V.I.C.I.O
- The Exotic Sounds of TJ (2014)
