= Andy Andy =

Dominican musician

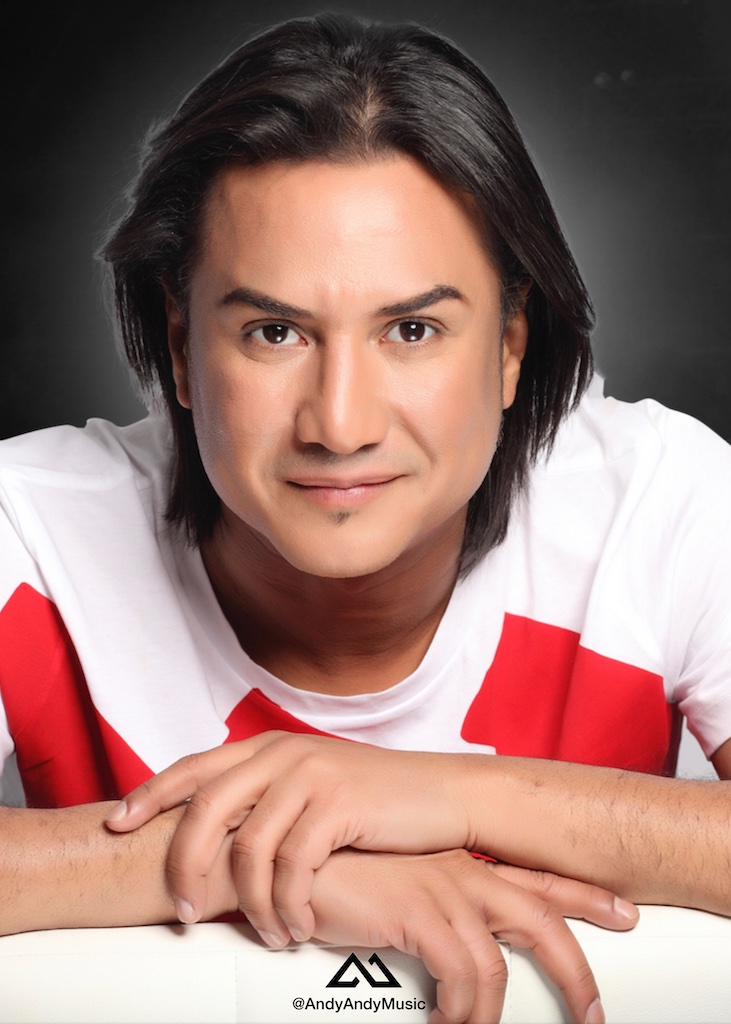

Background information
- Born: Azua de Compostela
- Genres: Bachata; Latin pop; merengue
- Occupations: Singer; songwriter
- Years active: 1996 - present
- Labels: Sony; UBO; EMI
- Website: andyandymusic.com

Angel Villalona better known as Andy Andy is a Dominican musician from the Villalona family. Starting as a merenguero, he gained fame when he changed to bachata.

== Career ==
Andy Andy is one of the most successful Dominican artists in the world, having sold over one million records in the United States to date, and held the Number 1 sales position for more than 39 consecutive weeks. He is the first Dominican artist in Latin music history to win three Billboard Awards in a single night.

Multiple nominations: Latin Grammys, 7 nominations to Premio Lo Nuestro, Premios Casandra winner and others. He has also occupied multiple top spots on a variety of important radio charts and other preferred media showcases in the country.

He produced all seven of his bachata albums. He sang duets with important Latin international singers such as Tito "El Bambino", Milly Quezada, Angel y Khriz, Fernando Villalona, Luis Segura, LDA, Alex Matos, Bimbo and others.

His first music album, Aquí Conmigo ("Here With Me"), was released in 2002. His second album, Necesito Un Amor ("I Need A Love"), was released in 2003 with the hits Voy A Tener Que Olividarte and Necesito Un Amor. His next album, Ironia ("Irony"), was released in 2005. His hit, Que Ironia, came in three forms: bachata, reggaeton, and balada, and his second hit, A Quien Le Importa, was featured in bachata and balada.

In 2002, Andy's debut album, Aqui Conmigo was nominated as best "New Artist Tropical Salsa Air Play Track of the Year" at the Billboard Awards. In 2003, Andy's second album, Necesito un Amor, was nominated for a Latin Grammy for "Best Contemporary Tropical Album of the Year".

- 2005, Winner in Dominican Republic of the Casadra Awards as "Best Video" with "Que Ironia".
- 2006, First Dominican Artist who wins 3 Latin Billboard Awards in one single night in the history of Latin Music. Categories: Best Tropical Album "Ironia", Best Traditional Tropical Album "Ironia", and Best Tropical Song "Que Ironia".
- Honored by the Mayor of Yonkers, New York, Philip A. Amicone in 2006.
- 2006 In Mexico he was nominated for Best New Artist for the Premios Oye.
- 7 Premio Lo Nuestro nominations:

2004, One Nomination for "Best Traditional Tropical Artist" for his album Necesito Un Amor 2005, Three Nominations for "Best Tropical Album", "Best Traditional Tropical Artist" and "Best Tropical Song" categories for his album "Ironia". 2006, Two Nominations for Best Tropical Male Artist and Best Traditional Tropical Artist, for his concept album “My Life,” 2009, Andy Andy was nominated once again for "Premio Lo Nuestro" as "Best Traditional Tropical Artist.”

- July 4, 2011, Andy Andy released his new single "Mi Alma Loca" reaching the Top 10 of the Latin Tropical Billboard.
- September 4, 2011, Andy Andy received a key to the city from Mayor Robert Romano and declared the date of September 4, 2011 as the day of Andy Andy.
- April 10, 2013, Andy Andy, Olga Tañon and Alvaro Torres were guest artists to sing in front of the National Capitol Building in Washington, DC.

== Discography ==
- Por Una Mujer (1997)
- Cójele el Swing (1998)
- Justo a Tiempo (2000)
- Aquí Conmigo (2002)
- Necesito Un Amor (2003)
- Ironía (2005)
- Tú Me Haces Falta (2007)
- Mi Música... Dos Tiempos (2008)
- Placer y Castigo (2009)
- El Cariño Es Como Una Flor(2012)
- Soy De Llorar (2013)
- Es Mejor Decir Adios (2014)
- Vive Tu Vida (2015)
- Yo Te Amo (2015)
- Amor Eterno Homenaje (2016)
- Un Hombre Nuevo (2017)
- Sigo Siendo El Dueńo (2017)
- Adios Amor (2018)
- Tontos y Locos (2019)
- Lazaro (2020)
- Te Imagino (2022)
- Mis Primeras Bachatas (2023)

== Compilations ==
- My Life (2006)
- 10 de Colección (2007)
