= Desvelado (Bobby Pulido album) =

Studio album by Bobby Pulido
- Released: September 26, 1995
- Recorded: 1995
- Studio: Pro Sound Studio (McAllen, Texas)
- Genres: Tejano; country; cumbia norteña
- Length: 33:59
- Languages: Spanish; English
- Label: EMI Latin
- Producers: Enrique Elizondo; Roberto Pulido

Bobby Pulido chronology
Desvelado (1995)	Enséñame (1996)

Singles from Desvelado
- 1. "No Se Por Que" Released: 1995; 2. "Te Voy a Amar" Released: 1995; 3. "Desvelado" Released: 1996

Desvelado (English: Sleepless) is the debut studio album by American Tejano singer Bobby Pulido. The album charted in the top 10 of the US Top Latin Albums chart and sold over 100,000 copies in the US. It is also known for its title track, which became its third single and was written by Jorge Avena.

== Track listing ==
No.	Title	Writer(s)	Length
1.	"No Sé Por Qué"	Humerto Ramón
2.	"Desvelado"	Jorge Avena
3.	"Sabes"	Pedro Reyna
4.	"Cuando Me Dejes de Amar"	Juanita Cruz
5.	"Cindy Don't Know"	Daniel Adami
6.	"Te Voy a Amar"	Bobby Pulido
7.	"Quiero Decirte"	Juan H. Barrón
8.	"Se Me Olvidó Olvidarte"	Luis Padilla
9.	"Ya No Quiero Soñar"	Pulido
10.	"Regretfully"	Pulido
Total length:			33:59

== Personnel ==
- Bobby Pulido – vocals, production assistant
- Crossfire – music
- Brando Mireles – arrangements
- Jesse Cavazos – recording engineer
- Rob Russell – mixing engineer
- Enrique Elizondo – producer
- Roberto Pulido – producer for tracks 1 and 6
- Barbie Insua – design
- Mario Castellanos – photography

== Charts ==
=== Weekly charts ===
Weekly chart performance for Desvelado
Chart (1996)	Peak position
US Regional Mexican Albums (Billboard)	3
US Top Latin Albums (Billboard)	9

=== Year-end charts ===
Year-end chart performance for Desvelado
Chart (1996)	Position
US Regional Mexican Albums (Billboard)	11
US Top Latin Albums (Billboard)	30

== Certifications ==
Certifications for Desvelado
Region	Certification	Certified units/sales
United States (RIAA)	Platinum (Latin)	100,000^{^}
Summaries
^{^} Shipments figures based on certification alone.

== See also ==
- 1995 in Latin music
- Latin American music in the United States
