= Inocentes MC =

Inocentes MC is a merengue and reggaeton band. They released in 2000 their self-titled debut and were nominated for a Lo Nuestro Award for Tropical New Artist of the Year, losing to Kevin Ceballo. Their single "Me la Pego Con Otra Mujer" reached number thirty on the Billboard Latin Tropical Airplay chart.
