= El Florido Flores =

Salvadoran Latin-American performer

El Florido Flores is a Salvadoran Latin-American performer. In 2004, Flores released his debut album Aquí Estoy Yo... Arrastrando los Zapatos and the following year received a Lo Nuestro Award nomination for Tropical New Artist of the Year.
