= Orlando Conga =

Latin-American singer

Orlando Conga is a Latin-American singer. In 2007, Conga received a nomination for a Lo Nuestro Award for Tropical New Artist of the Year.
