= Luis Damón =

American singer

Luis Damón is an American singer. In 1996 released his debut album titled Solo (Alone) and was nominated the following year for a Lo Nuestro Award for Tropical New Artist of the Year. In 1998, Damón recorded a duet with Puerto-Rican American singer Olga Tañón, "Para Estar Contigo" ("To be With You"), which peaked at number 30 in the Billboard Latin Songs chart.
