= Inspector (band) =

Mexican band

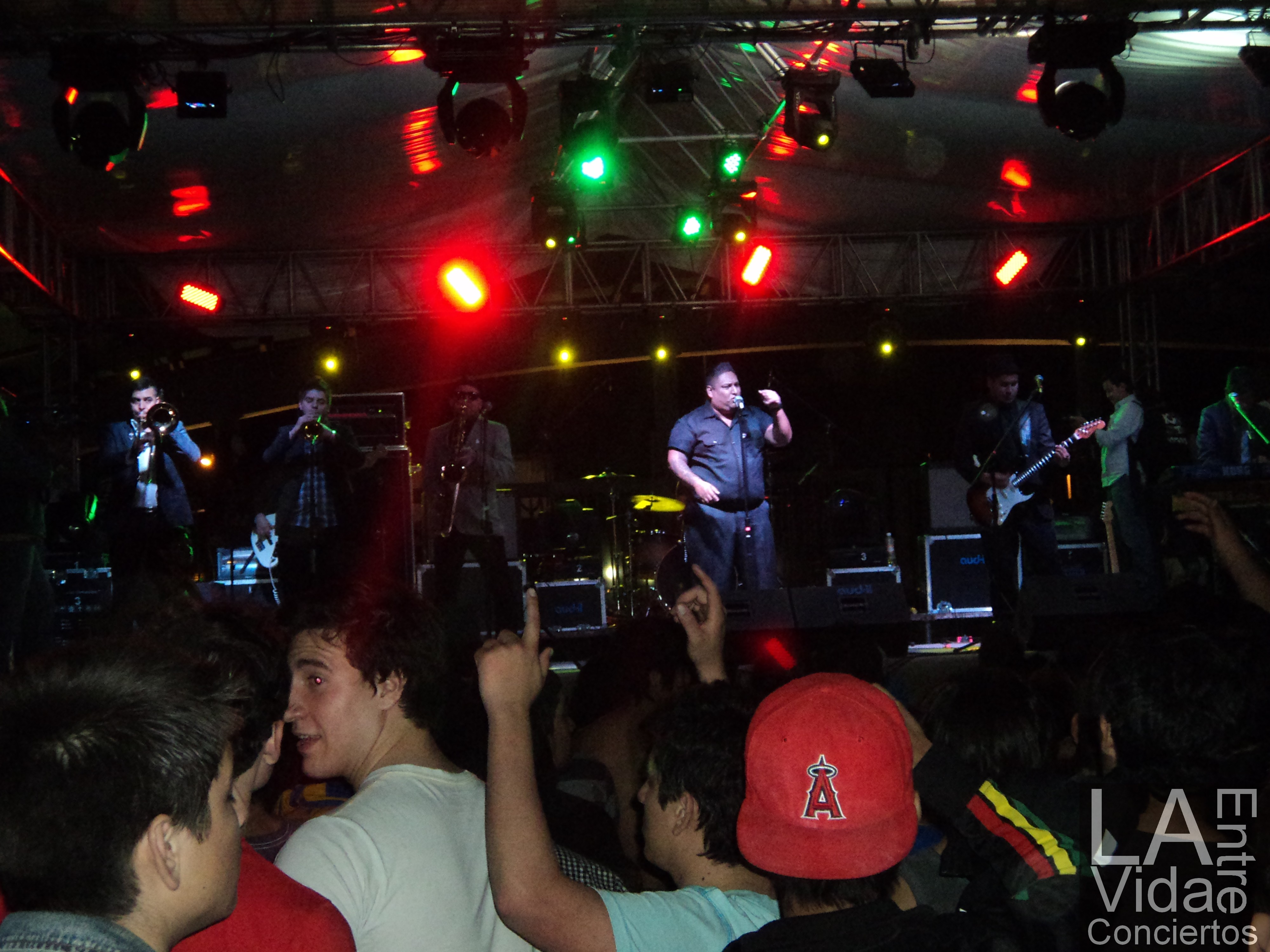
- Inspector at FutRock Fundidora on its 16th anniversary

Background information
- Origin: Monterrey, Nuevo León, Mexico
- Genre: ska
- Years active: 1995–present
- Members: Big Javy (Voice); Jesús Arriaga Moreno 'Padrino' (Tenor Sax); Homero Ontiveros (Teclado y Voz y Keyboards); Fabian Dee (Guitar); Chapa (Drums); Gil Treviño (Trumpet); Luis "Grillo Drummond" (Trombone); Alexis Manjarrez (Alto Sax); Honorio (Bass)
- Website: official web-site

Inspector is a band from Monterrey, Nuevo Leon. Their style is a blend of ska, reggae, 1960s rock-n-roll and romantic groups of the 1970s. They are part of the musical movement called the Avanzada Regia.

== History ==
Inspector was formed in November 1995. They recorded an independent album called Blanco y Negro in 1998 that made them known in the music scene in Monterrey and other cities such as Guadalajara, San Luis Potosí, Leon, Querétaro and Mexico City. In 1998, they won the prize "Nuestro Rock" for best new group which caused them to perform in more cities.

After hundreds of concerts throughout Mexico, in 2001, they were signed by the record company Universal Music Mexico and released their album Alma en fuego, an album that would go platinum due to its high sales and which resulted in their first single "Amnesia", which they performed in collaboration with Roco (vocalist from the group Maldita Vecindad) and Ruben Albarran (vocalist for Café Tacuba). This first single was followed by the singles "Amargo Adiós", "Cara de chango", "Sin rencor" and the footballing theme "Aguante". Alma en Fuego was nominated for a Lo Nuestro Award for Rock/Alternative Album of the Year while the band was listed for Rock New Artist at the 16th Lo Nuestro Awards, losing both to Chilean band La Ley and Mexican singer Alessandra Rosaldo, respectively.

In 2008, they released their third album, Unidad, Cerveza y Ska, an album where the idea was to give continuity between ska and the Mexican-ness and style of the band. From this production the following singles were released: "Ska Voovee Boobie Baby", "Cómo te extraño" and "Por última vez".

In 2009, their fourth album, Amar o morir, was released, where Inspector tried to re-discover their own style and express it in a fresh and interesting way by "travelling" through rhythms that range from punk to soul, or blues to funk through Ska. Their first single from this album is "El Dejado".

Inspector returned in 2009 with their fifth production called "INSPECTOR", which waw produced independently with 13 tracks, among which are the covers: "Besame Mucho" and "Our House", and a duet of the track "November" with the Mexican singer Ely Guerra.

== Members ==
- Big Javy: Vocals
- Padrino: Tenor Sax
- Homero: Keyboards
- Fabian moralez: Guitar
- Gil Ruzzo Treviño: Trumpet
- Luis Grillo: Trombone
- Jose Honorio: Bass
- Chapa Garcia: Drums

== Demos ==
- Mision Ska (Demo) (1996)
- Ska Live! (Demo) (1997)

== Studio discography ==
- Blanco y negro (1998)
- Alma en fuego (2001)
- Unidad, Cerveza y Ska (2004)
- Amar O Morir (2006)
- Inspector (2009)
- Ska A La Carta Vol 1 (2011)
- Inspección Retroacústica (2014)
- Páginas en Blanco (2018)
- Serpientes Y Escaleras (2023)

== Music videos ==
- "Amnesia"
- "Amargo Adiós"
- "Cara de Chango"
- "Ska Voovee Boobie Baby"
- "El dejado"
- "Cómo te extraño"
- "Me Estoy Enamorando"
