= Bobby Pulido =

American singer and politician (born 1973)

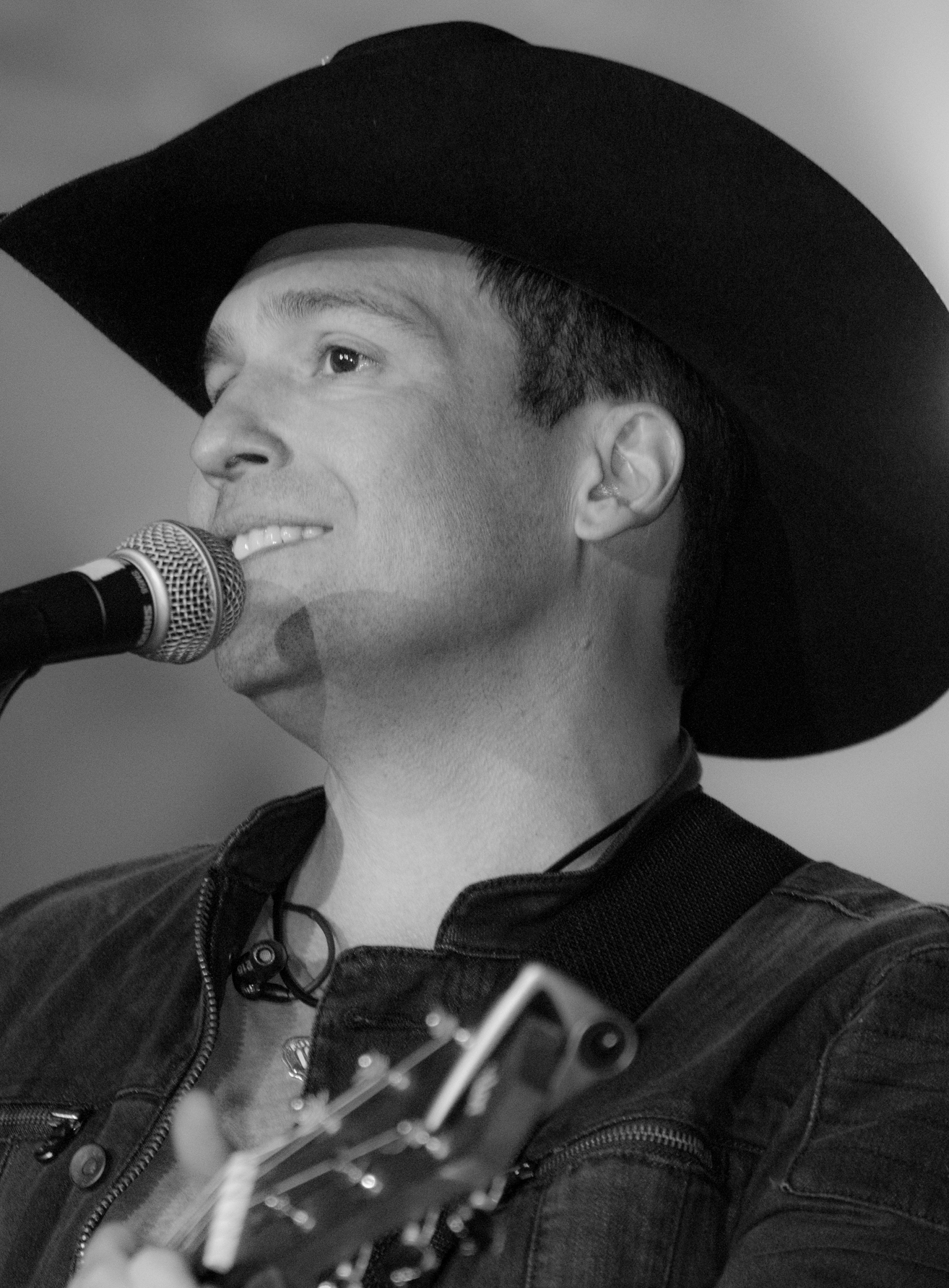
- Pulido in 2016

Member-elect of the U.S. House of Representatives from Texas's 15th district
- Assuming office January 3, 2027
- Succeeding: Monica De La Cruz

Personal details
- Born: José Roberto Pulido Jr. April 25, 1973 (age 53) Edinburg, Texas, U.S.
- Party: Democratic
- Spouses: Eliza Anzaldua (m. 1996; div. 2013); Mariana Morales (m. 2018)
- Children: 4
- Relatives: Roberto Pulido (father)
- Education: St. Mary's University, Texas (attended)
- Awards: See list
- Website: Official website
- Musical career
- Genres: Tejano; norteño; cumbia; country
- Labels: FONO; EMI Latin; Universal Latino; Apodaca

José Roberto Pulido Jr. (born April 25, 1973) is an American musician and politician who is the U.S. representative-elect from Texas's 15th congressional district. A 3 time Latin Grammy winner for Best Tejano Album, He is credited with expanding the audience for Tejano music among younger listeners, emerging as a teen idol among Mexican-American teenagers in the 1990s and becoming one of Tejano music's most prominent recording artists.

In 1995, Pulido debuted with his eponymous band. During the same year, he signed a recording contract with EMI Latin and released his debut album, Desvelado. It peaked at number nine on the United States Billboard Top Latin Albums chart and at number three on the US Billboard Regional Mexican Albums chart. The Recording Industry Association of America (RIAA) certified the album platinum, denoting shipments of 100,000 units. The title track established Pulido as a leading Tejano singer, although some veteran musicians argued that his success in the genre derived from the established musical success of his father, Roberto Pulido.

Pulido's album Enséñame (1996), which peaked at number two on the Billboard Regional Mexican Albums chart, garnered him a nomination for the Tejano Music Award for Male Entertainer of the Year and the Lo Nuestro Award for Regional Mexican New Artist of the Year. In 1998, Pulido performed a sold-out performance at the Auditorio Coca-Cola in Monterrey, becoming the first Tejano artist to do so. Pulido became the youngest honoree to receive the Orgullo de la Frontera award by the Fiestas Mexicanas in February 1999. Between 1998 and 2000, he was awarded the Male Entertainer of the Year at the Tejano Music Awards for three consecutive years. By 2000, the waning popularity of Tejano music resulted in Pulido's subsequent albums being less commercially successful and eventually ceasing to chart on Billboard.

In 2003, Pulido made his acting debut in the made-for-television film La Decada Furiosa, in which he played the lead role. He also appeared in the telenovelas Fuego en la sangre and Qué pobres tan ricos. Following the commercial disappointment of the album Enfermo de Amor (2007), he took a three-year hiatus. He returned to music with the release of Dias de Ayer (2010). He also returned to acting, appearing in the film Noches Con Platanito. In 2024, Pulido announced a farewell tour before launching a campaign for public office in Texas.

Pulido was the Democratic nominee for Texas's 15th congressional district in the 2026 election, defeating Republican incumbent Monica De La Cruz.

== Early life ==
Jose Roberto Pulido Jr. was born on April 25, 1973, in Edinburg, Texas. He is the oldest child of Roberto Pulido, an award-winning Tejano music singer, and Diana Montez, daughter of norteño musician Mario Montez of Los Donneños. Known professionally as Bobby Pulido, he attended Edinburg High School and became a member of the school's mariachi ensemble before joining his father's band, Los Clásicos, where he contributed as a saxophonist and backup vocalist. In 1994, EMI Latin released a compilation album titled Branding Icons, which included his collaboration with his father on "Contigo". Pulido was accepted at St. Mary's University, where he pursued a major in political science. Following the album's release, Pulido left college and pursued a singing career during Tejano music's golden age.

== Musical career ==
=== 1995–1999: Debut album and commercial success ===
Pulido formed his own band, with guitarist Gilbert Trejo, bassist Mike Fox, drummer and uncle Jimmy Montez, keyboardist Rey Gutierrez, and Frank Caballero on accordion. Initially, Pulido encountered criticism from Tejano musicians, who contended that he was capitalizing on the fame amassed by his father's well-established musical career. In May 1995, Pulido signed a recording agreement with EMI Latin, which led to the release of his debut album, Desvelado, that September. President of EMI Latin, Jose Behar, shared with Billboard his optimism for the singer's prospects within the country music market. His debut single "No Se Por Que" peaked at number 33 on the United States Billboard Hot Latin Tracks chart in December 1995. Debuting at number 44 on the Top Latin Albums, Desvelado produced the title track "Desvelado", where it peaked at number 21. The album established Pulido as one of the most popular Tejano artists. In April 1996, the album peaked at number nine on the Top Latin Albums chart and number three on the Billboard Regional Mexican Albums chart. Billboard's John Lannert described Pulido's chart placement as "impressive" and called him a "fast-rising artist". It was certified platinum by the Recording Industry Association of America (RIAA), signifying shipments of 100,000 units in the US. Pulido ended 1996 as the eighth best-selling regional Mexican artist and Desvelado ended the year as the eleventh best-selling regional Mexican album. The album reached sales of 100,000 units by the end of 1999. At the 1996 Tejano Music Awards, Pulido tied first place with Eddie Gonzales for Best New Rising Male Tejano Artist.

In July 1996, Pulido married Eliza Anzaldua, prompting a brief hiatus from his career. Pulido promoted his second album, Enséñame, which was released a month following his marriage. Billboard described Enséñame as at its essence a resounding ranchera album infused with catchy cumbia undertones, surmised that Pulido aimed to emulate Emilio Navaira, who sought to crossover and establish himself as a country music singer. Writing in the San Antonio Express-News, Ramiro Burr agreed that Pulido's vocals had undergone significant refinement compared to the preceding recordings. Enséñame peaked at number ten on the Top Latin Albums and number two on the Regional Mexican Albums charts. The album produced three top-20 Regional Mexican Airplay singles; "Enséñame", "Se Murió De Amor", and "La Rosa". The album earned Pulido a nomination for the Tejano Music Award for Male Entertainer of the Year and the Lo Nuestro Award for Regional Mexican New Artist of the Year. In collaboration with Graciela Beltrán, the Barrio Boyzz, Emilio Navaira, Pete Astudillo, and Jennifer Peña, Pulido contributed to the rendition of "Viviras Selena" for the 1997 soundtrack to the biopic film about Selena, referred to as the "Queen of Tejano Music" who was shot and killed in March 1995. By 1997, Pulido was recognized for helping introduce Tejano music to a younger demographic in the US. That year, he was awarded the Most Promising Band of the Year award at the 1997 Tejano Music Awards.

In 1998, Pulido released his third studio album Llegaste a Mi Vida, which peaked at number two on the Regional Mexican Albums chart and at number eleven on the Top Latin Albums chart. The only single to appear on the Latin singles chart, "Pedire", peaked at number 28 on the Hot Latin Songs. Llegaste a Mi Vida earned Pulido five of twelve nominations at the 1998 Tejano Music Awards; winning Male Vocalist of the Year, Male Entertainer of the Year, Tejano Crossover Song of the Year for "¿Dónde Estás?", and Tejano Album of the Year. The same year, Desvelado and Llegaste a Mi Vida, each sold 100,000 units in Mexico—a milestone for the singer. In September 1998, Pulido released his first live album En Vivo: Desde Monterrey Mexico, which was recorded on April 24, 1998. The album became the singer's fourth top-ten US recording and peaked at number 21 on the Top Latin Albums chart. Performing at a sold-out concert at the Auditorio Coca-Cola in Monterrey, Pulido became the first Tejano grupo musician to sell out the venue. In March 1999, he released his fourth studio album El Cazador, which produced the top-thirty Regional Mexican Airplay single "Cantarle a Ella". Pulido became the youngest recipient to be awarded the Orgullo de la Frontera from the Fiestas Mexicanas in February 1999. In an April 1999 interview, Pulido expressed interest in recording a Latin pop album, but said he had no interest in crossing over or recording English-language albums.

=== 2000–2009: Decline in popularity and hiatus ===
By 2000, Tejano music's popularity continued to wane, despite music critics' projections that the genre would recover by this time. Critics observed the dominance of more established Tejano singers like Navaira, Selena, Mazz, Michael Salgado, and Pulido on the airwaves of the US, where older generations of singers were not able to compete. Pulido became a teen idol among Mexican American teenage girls and one of the most influential Tejano recording artists in the same demographic. In March 2000, Pulido released Zona de Peligro, though it failed to match the commercial success of his earlier albums. None of its singles were commercially successful, though Pulido won the Tejano Music Award for Male Entertainer of the Year—his third consecutive win. According to musicologist Guadalupe San Miguel, Tejano musicians in the late 20th century and the early 21st century had become increasingly indistinguishable from each other. Pulido released his sixth studio album, Siempre Pensando En Ti, in March 2001; it was less commercially successful, peaking at number 50 on the Top Latin Albums chart. The album was Pulido's last recording to chart on Billboard. In 2002, Pulido hosted the Celebrity Golf Classic, which raised $50,000 (2002 USD) for the Easter Seals program. McAllen Mayor Leo Montalvo announced at the event that November 2, 2002, would be "Bobby Pulido Day".

Pulido released his eponymous album, Bobby, which produced the top 40 US single "Vanidosa". He recorded a cover version of Mexican singer Juan Gabriel's 1999 single "Se Me Olvidó Otra Vez" for Bobby. His subsequent albums, Montame (2003) and Vive (2005), failed to chart, ending his eight-year presence on Billboard. Pulido performed and recorded "Ya Ves" for the live televised benefit concert, Selena ¡VIVE!, in April 2005. His following album, Enfermo de Amor, was released in August 2007. AllMusic's Evan Gutierrez complimented Pulido's blending of music genres without "[pushing] the envelope very far", and said the album "sound[s] fresh rather than repetitive", although he found its production lacking. He called the title track and "Una Más" a roots rock recording, and "Desvelado Acústico" a "sophisticated acoustic" Latin pop track.

=== 2010–2026: Return to music ===
Pulido returned to recording music in 2010 and released Dias de Ayer in March. It earned Pulido a nomination for the Tejano Music Award for Male Vocalist of the Year, his first since 2003. Two years later, he released Lo Mio, his first album on Apodaca Records. In 2013, Pulido recorded with former Aventura vocalist Henry Santos on Santos' song "No Sé Vivir Sin Tí".

In November 2015, Pulido released "No Es Como Tú", a track from his twelfth studio album, Hoy. The album was Pulido's first in which he was the sole songwriter. Pulido told the Mexican newspaper Publimentero that he planned to release Hoy exclusively through his social networking sites to combat piracy and encourage physical album sales, saying he wanted to "help fight the war" against declining physical music consumption. He was against the digital age of downloading and music streaming in the popular market.

In a May 2016 concert, Pulido performed "Si No Te Hubiera Conocido", a song he recorded with Miguel Luna that had remained unreleased for years. At the 2022 Latin Grammy Awards, Pulido won Best Tejano Album for his studio album, Para Que Baile Mi Pueblo. In November 2024, Pulido announced his retirement from music to pursue a career in politics after a farewell tour starting in January 2025. At the 2025 Latin Grammy Awards, Pulido won his second Latin Grammy for Best Tejano Album for his live album, Bobby Pulido & Friends: Una Tuya y Una Mía (Vol. 1/En Vivo). Pulido earned a 2026 American Grammy nomination for Best Mexican Music Album (Including Tejano) for his live album Bobby Pulido & Friends: Una Tuya y Una Mía - Por La Puerta Grande (En Vivo). At the 2026 Latin Grammy Awards, Pulido won his third Latin Grammy for best Tejano Album for his live album, Bobby Pulido & Friends: Una Tuya y Una Mía (Vol.2/En Vivo). He had won it nine days after winning his congressional seat race.

== Acting career ==
In 2003, Pulido made his acting debut in the telenovela television movie La Decada Furiosa, in which he played himself. Two years later, he appeared as a guest on the reality television show Big Brother México. In 2008, Pulido guest starred in three episodes of the telenovela series Fuego en La Sangre as himself. He returned to acting and guest starred as himself in two episodes of the talk show Noches con Platanito (2013–15). In 2014, he had a reoccurring minor role as himself in the telenovela Qué pobres tan ricos.

== Political career ==
External videos
- "Rep.-Elect Bobby Pulido Says Whoever Wants to Get the Latino Vote in 2028 Must Prioritize Immigration Reform", November 11, 2026, C-SPAN

On September 17, 2025, Pulido announced that he would run for the U.S. House of Representatives in Texas's 15th congressional district as a Democrat in the 2026 election, challenging Republican incumbent Monica De La Cruz. The 15th district was redrawn in 2025 Texas redistricting to be more favorable to Republicans. Pulido made appearances at quinceañeras, a major aspect of his campaign after his opponent dismissed him as a performer. He was an outspoken opponent of Trump. Pulido has faced criticism for his social media posts, including what the Associated Press called "crude and sexist jokes and links to pornographic websites." Pulido uploaded an image of himself pretending to urinate on Trump's star on the Hollywood Walk of Fame. In response, Pulido said his sense of humor, mostly in Spanish, "doesn't translate" well and is embarrassed by some of his posts. He ran as a "Blue Dog Democrat", seeking to recapture Hispanic voters who had largely moved to the right.

On Election Day, Pulido ousted De La Cruz as part of the 2026 blue wave. His 25 percentage point margin of victory was a 39 point shift from 2024, when De La Cruz won the district by 14 points.

== Personal life ==
Pulido married Eliza Anzaldua in July 1996. They had three sons, born in 1996, 1998 and 2005. However, Pulido filed for divorce in September 2013, after 17 years of marriage and four months of separation. He married Mariana Morales in November 2018 and his fourth son was born in December 2019.

During his musical career, Pulido's fans questioned his sexuality; he said he is not homosexual. Pulido spoke to a Mexican television news program in 2013 and told viewers he is straight and that he has gay fans, which he said did not concern him. In April 2010, media outlets questioned Pulido after he released a music video in which he plays a stereotypical gay male; the singer said he wanted to "try something different [in his music videos]" and defended his gay followers, saying he has nothing against the LGBT community. After Puerto Rican pop singer Ricky Martin came out, Pulido defended Martin's decision, saying "he is living his dreams".

== Discography ==
- Desvelado (1995)
- Enséñame (1996)
- Llegaste a Mi Vida (1997)
- El Cazador (1999)
- Zona de Peligro (2000)
- Siempre Pensando En Ti (2001)
- Bobby (2002)
- Móntame (2003)
- Vive (2005)
- Enfermo de Amor (2007)
- Dias de Ayer (2010)
- Lo Mío (2013)
- Para Que Baile Mi Pueblo (2022)

== Filmography ==
Film and television roles
Year	Title	Role	Notes
1999	¡Mi Gente! My People!	Himself	TV documentary
2003	La decada furiosa	Himself	
2005	Selena ¡VIVE!	Himself	Performer
2005	Big Brother Mexico	Himself	Guest
2006	México grupero	Himself	TV documentary
2008	Fuego en la sangre	Himself	Guest starred in three episodes
2012	This Is MY Country, Twin Fiddles and Accordion	Himself	TV documentary
2013–15	Noches Con Platanito	Himself	Musical guest, and guest
2014	Qué pobres tan ricos	Himself	Guest starred in four episodes
2018	Enamorándonos	Himself	TV documentary
2018	Las Buchonas	El Trueno	

== See also ==
- Music of Texas
- List of Hispanic and Latino Americans

== Works cited ==
- Cooper, Jonathan J. (February 28, 2026). "Democrats look to Tejano music star Bobby Pulido in a high-stakes South Texas congressional race". AP News. Archived from the original on August 5, 2026.
- Cardenas, Frank (November 21, 2024). "Bobby Pulido announces retirement from Tejano to become politician". San Antonio Express-News. Archived from the original on November 23, 2024.
- Medina, John Henry (November 22, 2024). "Bobby Pulido Announces Final Tour, Retirement, Plans For Public Office". Tejano Nation. Archived from the original on March 4, 2026.
- Medina, John Henry (November 17, 2022). "Bobby Pulido wins Best Tejano Album at 23rd annual Latin Grammy Awards". Tejano Nation. Archived from the original on June 2, 2023.
- Burr, Ramiro (1999). The Billboard Guide to Tejano and Regional Mexican Music. Billboard books. ISBN 0-8230-7691-1.
- Dorsey, Margaret E. (2002). Pachangas: Borderlands Music, U.S. Politics, and Transnational Marketing. University of Texas Press. ISBN 0-292-78223-3.
- San Miguel, Guadalupe (2002). Tejano Proud: Tex-Mex Music in the Twentieth Century. Texas A&M University Press. ISBN 1-58544-188-0. - Read online, registration required
- Mayer, Vicki A. (2000). Mexican Americans, Mass Media, and Cultural Citizenship: Cultural Affirmation and Consumer Alienation in San Antonio, Texas. University of Texas Press.
- Pulido, Bobby. "Biography". Bobbypulido.com (in Spanish). Archived from the original on April 1, 2016.
- Bush, John. "Bobby Pulido > Biography". AllMusic. Rovi Corporation. Archived from the original on September 28, 2016.
- Lannert, John (May 27, 1995). "Latin Notas". Billboard. Vol. 107, no. 21.
- Burr, Ramiro (September 2, 1995). "Crossing the Country". Billboard. Vol. 107, no. 35. p. 42.
- "Billboard Hot Latin Tracks > December 16, 1995". Billboard. Vol. 108, no. 50. December 16, 1995. p. 65.
- "Billboard Top Latin Albums > February 3, 1996". Billboard. Vol. 108, no. 5. February 3, 1996. pp. 42, 45.
- Massa, Lavive (May 13, 2016). "Visita el 'golden boy' bobby pulido convive con sus seguidores". Diario la Verdad (in Spanish). Archived from the original on May 14, 2016.
- "Billboard Top Latin Albums > April 13, 1996". Billboard. Vol. 108, no. 15. April 13, 1996. p. 42.
- Lannert, John (May 4, 1996). "Latin Notas". Billboard. Vol. 108, no. 18. pp. 28, 36.
- "The Year in Music 1996". Billboard. Vol. 108, no. 52. December 28, 1996. p. 41.
- "1996 Tejano Music Awards Winners". Career Focus for Today's Rising Black Professional (3): 48. "Those claiming the honor of Best New Rising Tejano Artists were Eddie Gonzales and Grupo Vida, group category; Elida Reyna, female; and a tie between Bobby Pulido and Eddie Gonzales; male."
- Verna, Paul (October 5, 1996). "Album Reviews". Billboard. Vol. 108, no. 40. pp. 91–92.
- Burr, Ramiro (July 19, 1997). "The New Faces". Billboard. Vol. 109, no. 29. p. 50.
- "Premios a Lo Mejor De La Música Latina". El Tiempo (in Spanish). Casa Editorial El Tiempo S.A. April 8, 1997. Archived from the original on September 8, 2013.
- Burr, Ramiro (February 28, 1997). "Tejano's big event – Awards may go to more than the usual names Saturday night". San Antonio Express-News.
- Lannert, John (February 8, 1997). "Latin Notas". Billboard. Vol. 109, no. 6. p. 30.
- Flores, Daniel (March 29, 2015). "Selena's Legacy: Queen of Tejano still reigns". Valley Morning Star. p. 1 – via Newspapers.com.
- "One Liners". Hispanic Link Weekly Report. 41. 1998. "Tejano singer Bobby Pulido, a big winner at last month's Tejano Music Awards, is finding unprecedented success in Mexico; his two albums Desvelado and Llegaste a mi vida have each sold over 100,000 copies in the country."
- "En Vivo: Desde Monterrey Mexico > AllMusic". AllMusic. Archived from the original on September 28, 2016.
- Burr, Ramiro (July 25, 1998). "Tejano Territory". Billboard. Vol. 110, no. 30. p. 54.
- "Artists & Music". Billboard. Vol. 111, no. 17. April 24, 1999. p. 52.
- Lannert, John (May 27, 2000). "Latin Notas". Billboard. Vol. 112, no. 22. p. 70.
- "Bobby Pulido > Acting career". IMDb.com. Archived from the original on January 9, 2016.
- Metz, John Powell (June 28, 2005). "Lasting Tribute". Corpus Christi Caller Times. Archived from the original on March 4, 2016.
- Gutierrez, Evan C. (2007). "Enfermo de Amor". AllMusic. Archived from the original on September 28, 2016.
- Pulido, Bobby (2010). Dias de Ayer (Compact disc). Bobby Pulido Music.
- "31st Annual Tejano Music Awards Announce Top 5 Nominees". Broadway.com. September 9, 2011. Archived from the original on May 14, 2016.
- "2003 Tejano Music Awards Nominees". Billboard. March 18, 2003. Archived from the original on May 29, 2016.
- Perez, Daniella (November 17, 2015). "Se avienta Bobby Pulido a experimentar en su nuevo disco". Publimetro (in Spanish). Archived from the original on August 9, 2016.
- "Bobby Pulido se divorcia tras 17 años de matrimonio". People en Español (in Spanish). September 23, 2013. Archived from the original on May 6, 2016.
- Reyes, Roberto (July 14, 2013). "Habla de Su Sexualidad". Milenio (in Spanish). Archived from the original on April 12, 2018.
- "Bobby Pulido y su controversial video". Info7 (Monterrey, Mexico) (in Spanish). April 22, 2010. Archived from the original on September 13, 2016.
- Salinas, Aidee (May 31, 2016). "Bobby Pulido publica polémica foto en Instagram". Univision (in Spanish). Archived from the original on June 15, 2016.
- Mier, Tomás (September 17, 2025). "Tejano Icon Bobby Pulido Is Officially Running for Congress: South Texas Is 'In My DNA'". Rolling Stone. Archived from the original on September 17, 2025.
- Flores, Rosa; Guerrero, Kay (September 17, 2025). "Tejano music star Bobby Pulido launches bid for Congress as a Democrat in deep red Texas". MSNBC. Archived from the original on September 17, 2025.
- Salinas, Roy (March 12, 1997). "Tejano Music Awards draw 30,000 fans to Alamodome in San Antonio". Duval County Picture. Vol. 12, no. 11. San Diego, Texas. p. 3 – via Portal to Texas History.
- Medina, John Henry (November 13, 2025). "Bobby Pulido Wins Best Tejano Album at 26th Annual Latin Grammy Awards". Tejano Nation. Archived from the original on January 2, 2026.

U.S. House of Representatives
Preceded by Monica De La Cruz	Member of the U.S. House of Representatives from Texas's 15th congressional district Taking office 2027	Elect
