= Rafy Burgos =

Dominican singer

Rafy Burgos (also known as El Cupido) is a Dominican singer. In 2003, Burgos received a nomination for a Lo Nuestro Award for Tropical New Artist of the Year.
