= Palomo =

Mountain in Chile

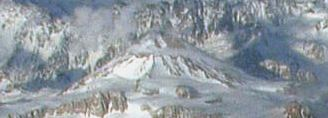
- Palomo volcano

Highest point
- Elevation: 4,860 m (15,940 ft)
- Coordinates: 34.608°S 70.295°W

Geography
- Location: Chile
- Parent range: Andes

Geology
- Mountain type: Stratovolcano

Palomo ("dove"; after the shape of its glaciers) is a 4,860 metres (15,940 ft) high Chilean stratovolcano located in the commune of Machali, Cachapoal province, Libertador General Bernardo O'Higgins Region, west of Caldera del Atuel. Together with Tinguiririca it is one of two volcanoes in the region with evidence of Holocene volcanism. The volcano is remote and knowledge on its geology and potential volcanic hazards is limited.

The edifice of the volcano is irregular and various estimates of its volume exist, ranging 16.6–35.5 cubic kilometres (4.0–8.5 cu mi). The best estimate is considered to be 9.2 cubic kilometres (2.2 cu mi). Palomo rises from an elevation of about 3,215 metres (10,548 ft), and it covers a surface area of 22.4 square kilometres (8.6 sq mi). Beneath the volcano lie two calderas with diameters of 3 kilometres (1.9 mi) and 5 kilometres (3.1 mi); the summit has a double crater as well, which may reflect a northeastward migration of volcanic activity. 4.5 kilometres (2.8 mi) northeast of Palomo lies the 3,300 metres (10,800 ft) high Andrès subsidiary vent. This vent features a 500 metres (1,600 ft) wide crater that opens to the south. Andrés is constructed on a granitoid basement that slopes into the valley of Rio Cortaderal, and its name relates to the son of Reynaldo Charrier, a geologist who described the subsidiary centre in 2010 and who hoped that his son would one day also know the mountain range. It and Palomo are located on the El Diablo fault; a number of other volcanoes and geothermal manifestations are located along its trace, which separates Mesozoic and Cenozoic geological formations.

The volcano is flanked by glaciers. Several of these sizeable glaciers form the Rio Blanco, Rio Cortaderal and Rio de los Cipreses on the northern flank, which drain into the Cachapoal River. A thermal event in the volcano in 1847 caused a meltwater flood on the Cachapoal River. The southern slope features the 10 kilometres (6.2 mi) Universidad Glacier, which forms the Rio San Andrés which drains into the Tinguiririrca River. With a snowline altitude of 3,100–3,300 metres (10,200–10,800 ft), it was the second longest glacier in Central Chile in 1958, but since then glaciers in the region have shrunk.

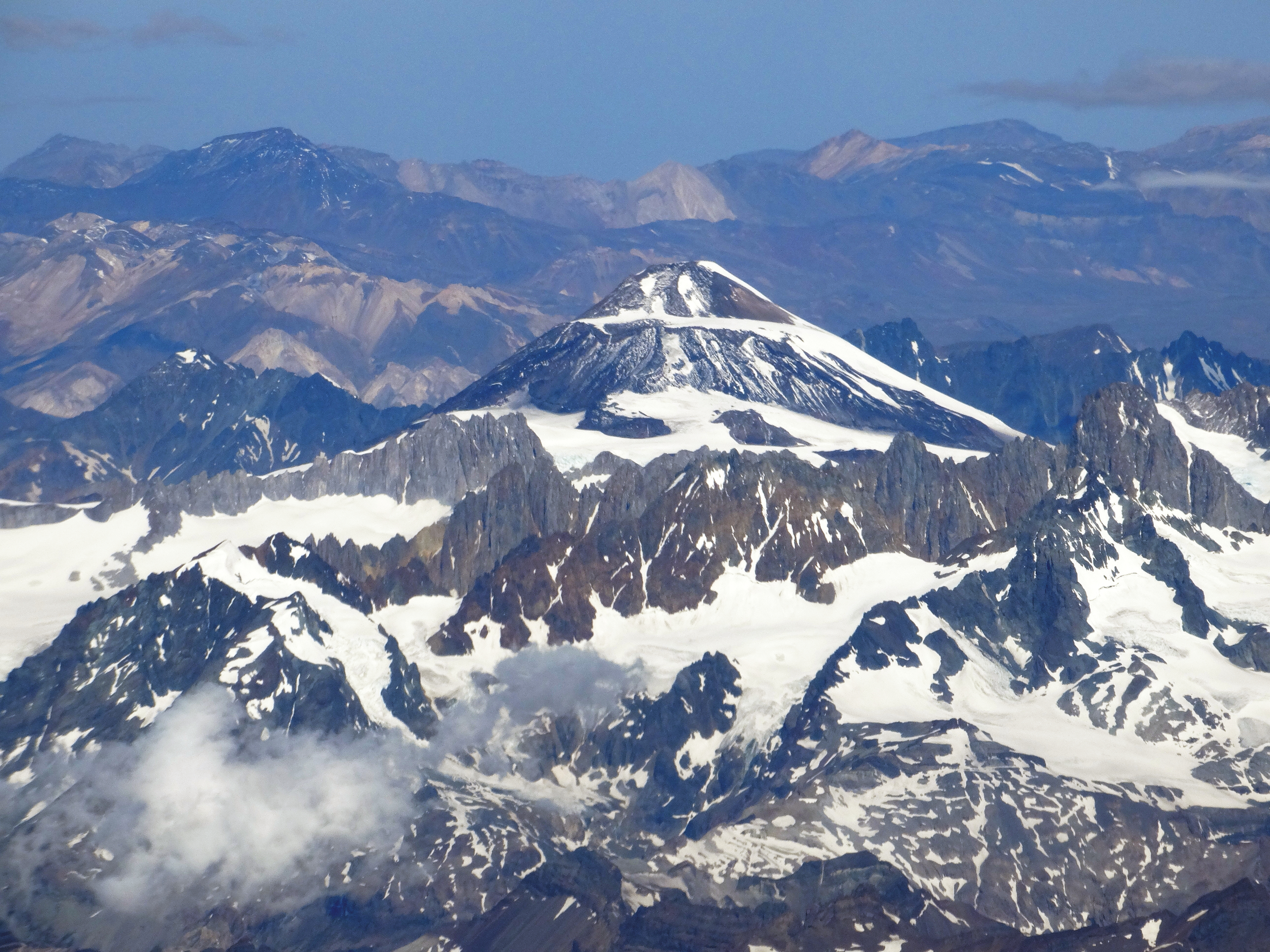
Palomo volcano from the air (view to the east)

The edifice is mainly constructed by lava flows that bury parts of the calderas in the foot of the volcano. Palomo has erupted andesite and dacite, as well as basaltic andesite. All rocks are calc-alkaline rocks of medium potassium content. The main edifice rocks contain abundant phenocrysts dominated by plagioclase; clinopyroxene, orthopyroxene and other minerals are less prevalent. The Andrés edifice has a distinct composition, with more amphibole and olivine and less plagioclase than the main edifice.

Argon–argon dating has been used to date the rocks erupted by Palomo. The main summit yielded dates of 100,000 ± 40,000 years ago, while postglacial lavas of Andrés are dated at 40,000 ± 30,000 years ago, but volcanic activity at Palomo may have continued into pre-Hispanic times. A flood in the Cachapoal Valley in 1847 may have been triggered by a geothermal event on the Palomo volcano. Future activity at Palomo might generate lahars through the melting of ice, which could affect the valleys of the rivers draining the volcano.

== See also ==
- List of volcanoes in Chile
- List of mountains in the Andes
