= Villalona =

Villalona is a surname. Notable people with the surname include:

- Angel Villalona (born 1990), Dominican Republic baseball player
- Fernando Villalona (born 1955), Dominican Republic singer
