= Alessandra Rosaldo =

Mexican actress, singer and dancer (born 1971)

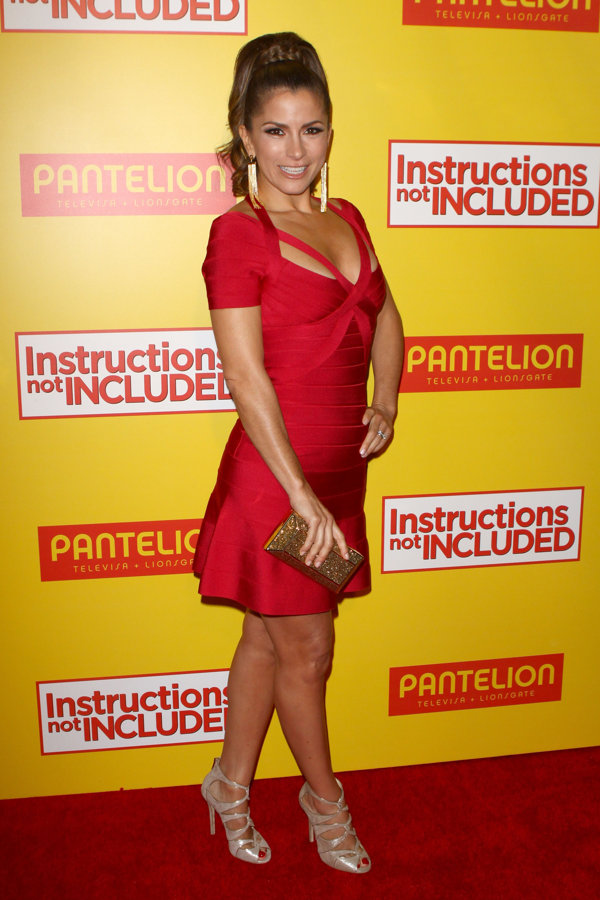
- Rosaldo in 2012
- Born: Alejandra Sánchez Barrero; September 11, 1971 (age 55); Mexico City, Mexico
- Occupations: Singer-songwriter, musician, actress
- Years active: 1989–present
- Spouse: Eugenio Derbez (m. 2012)
- Children: 1

Alejandra Sánchez Barrero (born September 11, 1971), known professionally as Alessandra Rosaldo, is a Mexican actress, singer and dancer. In 2006, she was the winner of the first prize in Televisa Network's, later broadcast in Univision Bailando por un Sueño.

She has played main and supporting roles in many telenovelas. She has sold over 4 million records as the lead singer of her pop music band Sentidos Opuestos and as a solo singer, for which she received the Lo Nuestro Award for Rock New Artist of the Year at the 16th Lo Nuestro Awards.

== Early life ==
She was named Alejandra Sánchez Barrero by her parents Gabriela Barrero and Jaime Sánchez Rosaldo, the first of three sisters, followed by Valeria and Mariana. She studied at Colegio Alemán Alexander von Humboldt, where she became fluent in German and English. She finished her high school studies at the American School Foundation, also in Mexico City. As the daughter of a successful pop music producer she met studio musicians and singers and at age 12 began to work with her father as a studio backup singer.

== Career ==
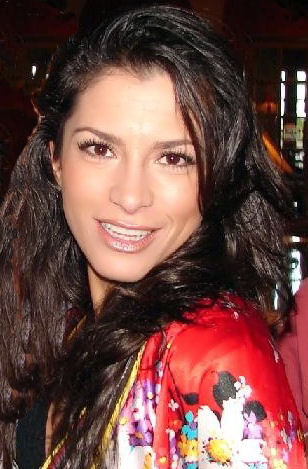
Rosaldo in 2006.

Rosaldo is the lead singer of the band Sentidos Opuestos.

=== Telenovelas ===
Rosaldo played the antagonist Brenda Sakal in DKDA: Sueños de juventud from 1999-2000. She appeared as La Flower Aventuras en el Tiempo (Adventures through Time) in 2001. She portrayed Karla Cancino in Salomé. She was Paulina Almazan Amarte es mi Pecado in 2003-2004. She played Julia Mistral in the soap opera Ni contigo ni sin ti.

== Personal life ==
She is married to actor and comedian Eugenio Derbez. They have a daughter.
