= Roberto Pulido =

American musician (born 1950)

José Roberto Pulido (born March 1, 1950), known as Roberto "El Primo" Pulido, is an American musician who has been recognized as a Tejano music pioneer. Pulido is known for his introduction of the accordion and saxophone into his music which "helped bridged the traditional conjunto and the modern Tejano camps" in the mid-1970s. Pulido is the father of Tejano musicians Alma Pulido and Bobby Pulido.

== Background ==
Roberto "El Primo" Pulido was born and raised in Edinburg, Texas to José "Don Chuy" Pulido and Adelina. Pulido first gained interest in the music industry after his uncle Leonel Pulido's band (the Los Cardenales de Leonel Pulido) introduced him to the genre and taught him the basics of music. At the age of twelve, Pulido repaired his grandfather's guitar and began playing it and singing around the house. When he was fifteen, he joined the Los Hermanos Layton in Elsa, Texas. Pulido's father bought him his first saxophone in the 1960s. In 1969, a senior, Pulido garnered several music scholarships and enrolled at Pan American University and took music studies as his major. A year later, he married Diana Montes, daughter of Mario Montes of Los Donnenos. In 1973, Pulido gained a bachelor's degree and began teaching music in high school for an annual salary of $6,100. After a couple of years, Pulido retired from teaching and started his own band Los Clasicos, which included his uncle Leonel and brothers Roel and Joel Pulido on sax. The band was signed to indie labels and produced only regional hits, including "Copa Tras Copa", "Simplemente", "Senorita Cantinera", "No Nos Quieren, Corazon", and "Flecha Envenenada".

Pulido won the first Tejano Music Award for Male Vocalist of the Year and the Tejano Music Award for Male Entertainer of the Year in 1981 and won once more in 1985 (Male Vocalist of the Year). In 1989, Pulido signed with EMI Latin, which helped increased public awareness and record sales. His 1994 album, Te Vi Partir, peaked at number 33 on the United States Billboard Top Latin Albums chart and number 12 on the Billboard Regional Mexican Albums chart. The album also produced the top twenty single "Ya Ahora Es Tarde". That same year, EMI Latin released a compilation album Branding Icons featuring Pulido on the album with his son Bobby Pulido on the song "Contigo". The song was responsible for jump-starting Bobby's musical career.

== Discography ==
Roberto Pulido Discography
Record Label	Album	Year
GCP Records	Vol. 1	
GCP Records	Vol. 2	1975
GCP Records	Vol. 3	1976
GCP Records	Hojita	1976
Falcon/ARV Records	Copa Tras Copa	1977
Falcon/ARV Records	On Tour	1978
Falcon/ARV Records	Seguire Mi Camino	1978
Falcon/ARV Records	El Primo	1979
Falcon/ARV Records	Mi Pequeñito	1980
Falcon/ARV Records	Polkas, Redovas y Huapangos	
Falcon/ARV Records	Llorando En Mi Tumba	
Falcon/ARV Records	Aquí	1981
Falcon/ARV Records	Amor Derecho	1984
Profono International Records	Envidias	1982
Profono International Records	La Silla De Tu Abuelo	1983
Freddie Records	Voy A Tirarme A Los Vicios	1984
Freddie Records	Dame Amor - Con Las Alas Rotas	1984
Freddie Records	Otra Vez A La Cantina	1985
Freddie Records	Un Rosal	1985
Freddie Records	Simplemente	1986
Freddie Records	El Bandolero	1987
Freddie Records	Desde Mi Rancho	1987
Freddie Records	Un Día Llegasrte - Corazon De Hielo	1988
Freddie Records	Amor Ingrato	1989
Freddie Records	Que Esperabas De Mi	
Capitol/EMI Records	Nuevos Caminos	1990
Capitol/EMI Records	Si a todas Fueran Como Tu	1990
Capitol/EMI Records	Si Te Decides	1992
Capitol/EMI Records	LIVE!	1993
Capitol/EMI Records	Dulces Recuerdos	1993
Capitol/EMI Records	Te Vi Partir	1994
Capitol/EMI Records	Toro Prieto	1995
Capitol/EMI Records	A Través De Los Años	1996
Capitol/EMI Records	Todavia Creo En El Amor	1998
Primo/Sniper Records	Bien Pulido	2001
Primo/Sniper Records	Vino Tequila y Cerveza	
Primo/Sniper Records	Ahora Que	2009

== See also ==
- Music of Texas
- List of Hispanic and Latino Americans

== Notes ==
- Burr, Ramiro (1999). The Billboard Guide to Tejano and Regional Mexican Music. Billboard books. ISBN 0-8230-7691-1.
