= Lo Nuestro Award for Regional Mexican New Artist of the Year =

Latin music award

- Awarded for: Regional Mexican New Artist of the Year
- Country: United States
- Presented by: Univision
- First award: 1989
- Final award: 2012
- Website: univision.com/premiolonuestro

The Lo Nuestro Award for Regional Mexican New Artist of the Year was an honor presented annually by American network Univision. It was first awarded in 1989 and has been given annually since to recognize the most talented performers of Latin music. The nominees and winners were originally selected by a voting poll conducted among program directors of Spanish-language radio stations in the United States and also based on chart performance on Billboard Latin music charts, with the results being tabulated and certified by the accounting firm Deloitte. At the present time, the winners are selected by the audience through an online survey. The trophy awarded is shaped in the form of a treble clef.

The award was first presented to Mexican singer José Javier Solís. Mexican singer Pablo Montero and group Los Temerarios, winners in 1990 and 1999, respectively, were also nominated for a Grammy Award for Best Mexican/Mexican-American Album; while 2009 nominees Los Pikadientes de Caborca were also shortlisted for a Grammy Award for Best Regional Mexican Album. Mexican performer Ezequiel Peña was nominated as part of the group Banda Vallarta Show in 1993 and won as a solo performer two years later. Mexican singer and actress Mariana Seoane, winner in 2005, received a Latin Grammy Award nomination for Best Grupero Album. Mexican singer Gerardo Ortíz won the award in 2011, only a few weeks after he had survived an ambush attempt during which his cousin and business manager had been killed. In 2013, the Pop, Regional Mexican and Tropical Salsa New Artist of the Year categories were merged on a Lo Nuestro Award for New Artist of the Year category in the General Field.

== Winners and nominees ==
Listed below are the winners of the award for each year, as well as the other nominees for the majority of the years awarded.

Key	Meaning
‡	Indicates the winner

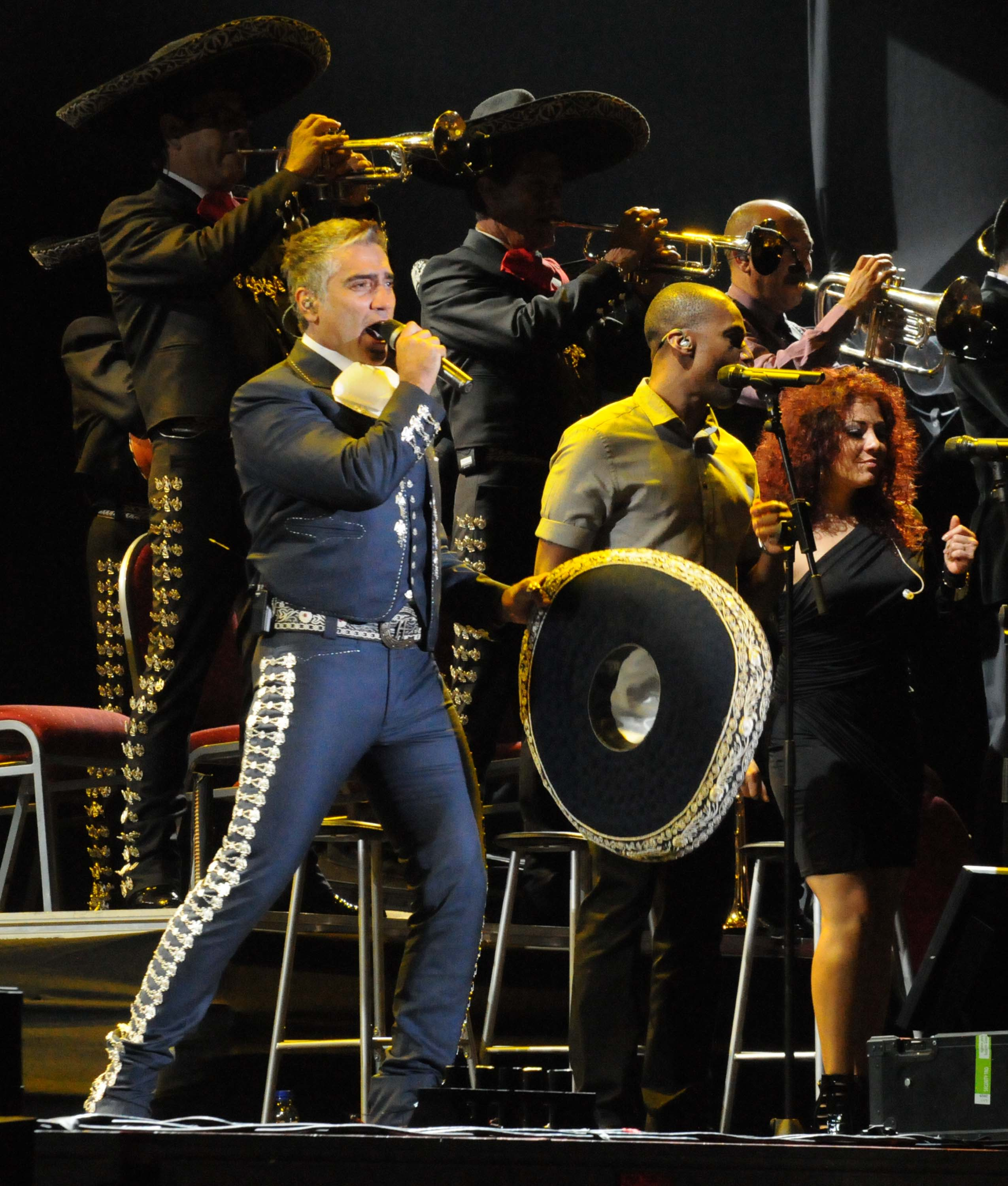
Mexican performer Alejandro Fernández (pictured in 2011), nominee in 1993

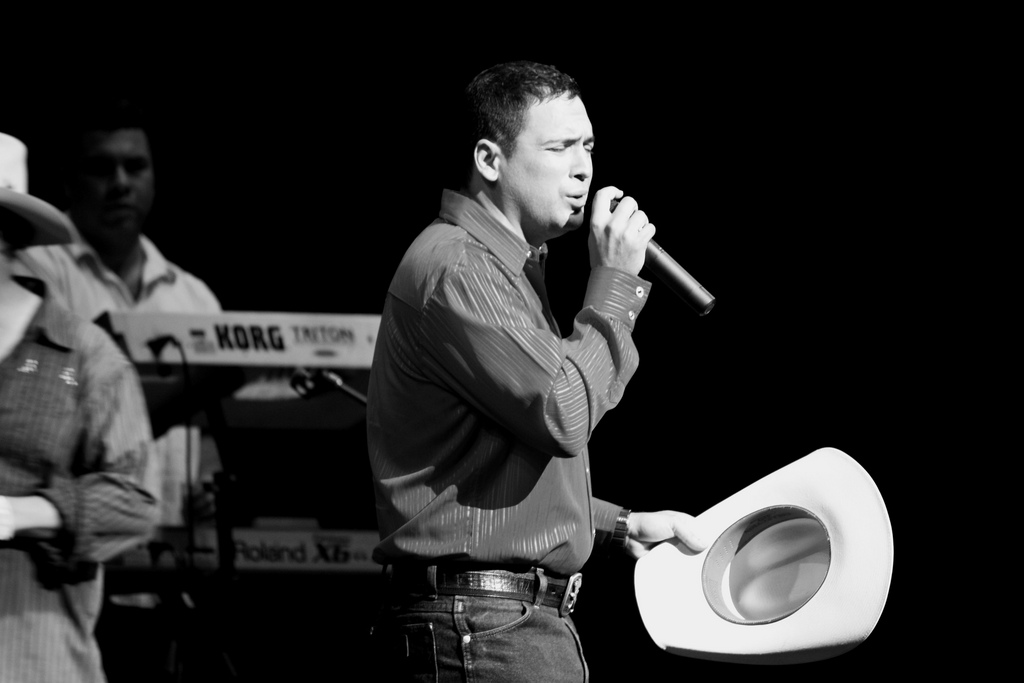
American singer Bobby Pulido (pictured in 2012), nominee in 1997

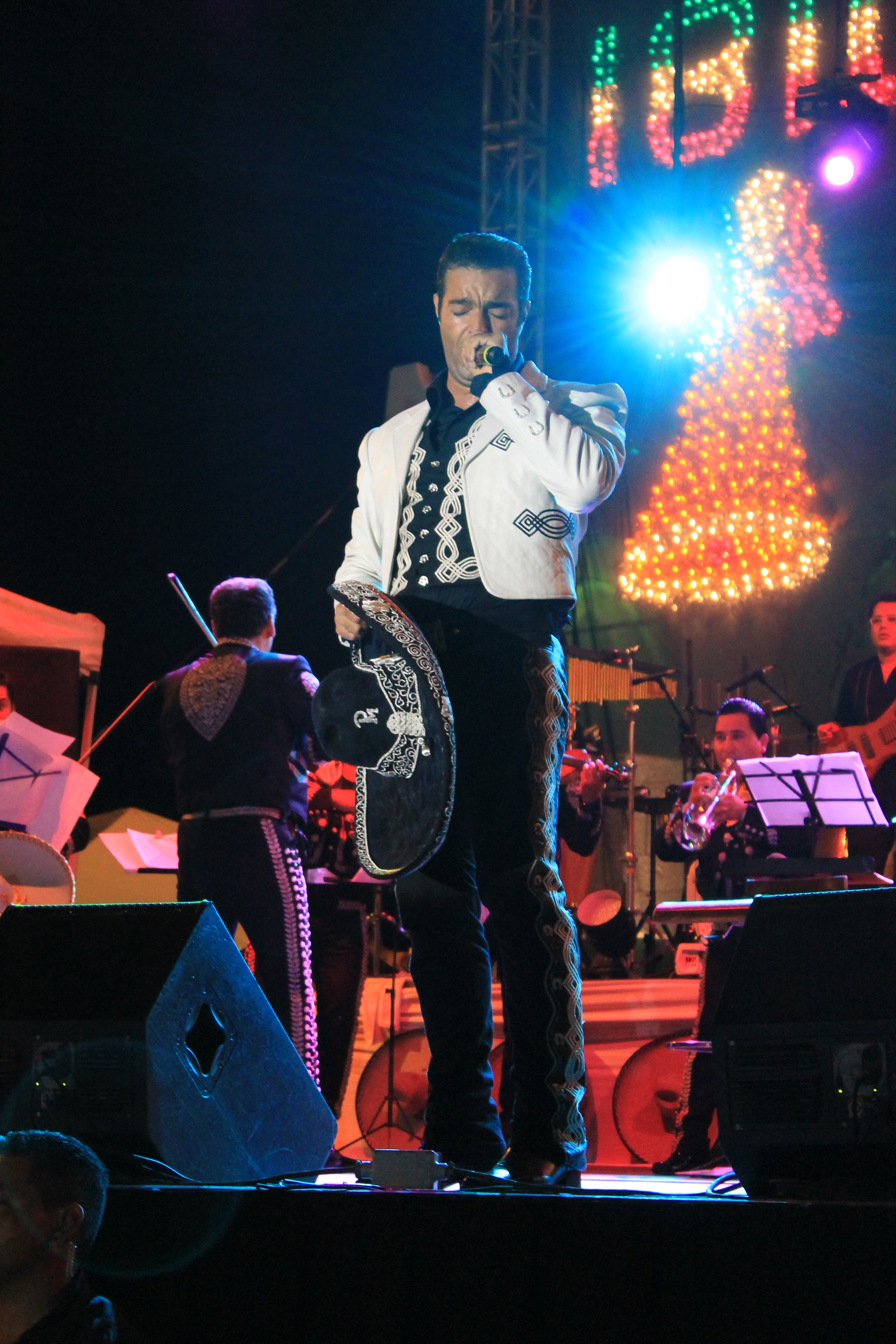
Mexican singer Pablo Montero (pictured in 2011), winner in 1999

Year	Performer	Ref
1989 (1st)	José Javier Solís‡	
1989 (1st)	Grupo Topaz	
1989 (1st)	Industria del Amor	
1989 (1st)	Eliseo Robles	
1990 (2nd)	Los Temerarios‡	
1990 (2nd)	Cielo Azul	
1990 (2nd)	Emilio Navaira	
1990 (2nd)	Xelencia	
1991 (3rd)	Ángeles Ochoa‡	
1991 (3rd)	Adalberto	
1991 (3rd)	Rocky Hernández	
1991 (3rd)	Texas Tornados	
1992 (4th)	Grupo Mojado‡	
1992 (4th)	Esmeralda	
1992 (4th)	Lalo y Los Descalzos	
1992 (4th)	Tecno Banda	
1993 (5th)	Banda Machos‡	
1993 (5th)	Banda Vallarta Show	
1993 (5th)	Alejandro Fernández	
1993 (5th)	Zeus	
1994 (6th)	Fama‡	
1994 (6th)	Pepe Aguilar	
1994 (6th)	Elsa García	
1994 (6th)	Los Carlos	
1995 (7th)	Ezequiel Peña‡	
1995 (7th)	Ana Bárbara	
1995 (7th)	Banda El Mexicano	
1995 (7th)	La Diferenzia	
1996 (8th)	Pete Astudillo‡	
1996 (8th)	Los Dinnos	
1996 (8th)	Los Rehenes	
1996 (8th)	Los Tiranos del Norte	
1997 (9th)	Límite‡	
1997 (9th)	Angelez Azules	
1997 (9th)	Jennifer y los Jetz	
1997 (9th)	Bobby Pulido	
1998 (10th)	Priscila y sus Balas de Plata‡	
1999 (11th)	Pablo Montero‡	
1999 (11th)	Guadalupe Esparza	
1999 (11th)	Yesenia Flores	
1999 (11th)	Julio Preciado	
1999 (11th)	Patricia Navidad	
2000 (12th)	A.B. Quintanilla and Kumbia Kings‡	
2000 (12th)	Corvo	
2000 (12th)	Grupo Tentación	
2000 (12th)	Los Askis	
2000 (12th)	Paco Barrón y su Norteños Clan	
2000 (12th)	Los Sementales de Nuevo León	
2001 (13th)	Dinora y la Juventud‡	
2001 (13th)	Lupillo Rivera	
2001 (13th)	Los Traviesos del Norte	
2001 (13th)	Voces del Rancho	
2002 (14th)	Jessie Morales‡	
2002 (14th)	Fato	
2002 (14th)	Germán Román y su Banda República	
2002 (14th)	Los Forasteros de San Luis	
2003 (15th)	Germán Lizárraga y su Banda Estrellas de Sinaloa‡	
2003 (15th)	Adolfo Urías y su Lobo Norteño	
2003 (15th)	Aracely Arámbula	
2003 (15th)	Aroma	
2004 (16th)	La Onda‡	
2004 (16th)	A.T.M	
2004 (16th)	Adán Cuen	
2004 (16th)	Ángel Garay	
2004 (16th)	Banda Alameda	
2004 (16th)	Big Pepe	
2004 (16th)	Conjunto Pirámide	
2004 (16th)	Iván Díaz	
2004 (16th)	Erika	
2004 (16th)	Víctor García	
2004 (16th)	Hermanos Higuera	
2004 (16th)	Isabela	
2004 (16th)	Jimena	
2004 (16th)	Joel Higuera con su Nuevo Grupo	
2004 (16th)	K-Paz de la Sierra	
2004 (16th)	Los Sombras del Malverde	
2004 (16th)	Pepito	
2004 (16th)	Punto y Aparte	
2004 (16th)	Sandra	
2004 (16th)	Santos Diablitos	
2004 (16th)	Úrsula Sol	
2004 (16th)	Talismán	
2004 (16th)	Temblor del Norte	
2004 (16th)	Universales del Norte	
2004 (16th)	Violento	
2004 (16th)	Zuly	
2005 (17th)	Mariana Seoane‡	
2005 (17th)	Climax	
2005 (17th)	Juan Tavares	
2005 (17th)	Kris Melody	
2006 (18th)	La Autoridad de la Sierra‡	
2006 (18th)	Los Elegidos	
2006 (18th)	Beto Terrazas	
2006 (18th)	Zaino	
2007 (19th)	Los Creadorez del Pasito Duranguense de Alfredo Ramírez‡	
2007 (19th)	Los Cuen's de Sinaloa	
2007 (19th)	Chelín Ortíz	
2008 (20th)	Banda Guasaveña‡	
2008 (20th)	Los Buitres de Culiacán Sinaloa	
2008 (20th)	Andrés Márquez	
2008 (20th)	Fidel Rueda	
2009 (21st)	AK-7‡	
2009 (21st)	Aliados de la Sierra	
2009 (21st)	Germán Montero	
2009 (21st)	Los Pikadientes de Caborca	
2009 (21st)	Uranio	
2011 (23rd)	Gerardo Ortíz‡	
2011 (23rd)	Ángel Fresnillo	
2011 (23rd)	José Alfonso "El Plebe"	
2011 (23rd)	Los Reyes de Arranque	
2011 (23rd)	Voz de Mando	
2012 (24th)	Calibre 50‡	
2012 (24th)	Alex Rivera	
2012 (24th)	Alex Villareal	
2012 (24th)	El Bebeto y su Banda Patria Chica	

== See also ==
- Latin Grammy Award for Best New Artist
