= Premio Lo Nuestro 2004 =

Latin Music awards show

16th Lo Nuestro Awards
- Date: Thursday, February 26, 2004
- Site: Miami Arena, Miami, Florida, USA
- Hosted by: Adal Ramones

Premio Lo Nuestro 2004 was the 16th anniversary of a popular Latin Music Award show in U.S. The award show took place In Miami, Florida, and aired live on the Univision Network on Thursday, February 26, from 8-11 pm ET / PT (7-10 pm Central and Mountain). The show was hosted by Adal Ramones. The artists who performed in the show were:Ricky Martin, Thalía, Ricardo Arjona, Marco Antonio Solís, Sin Bandera, La Oreja de Van Gogh, Montez de Durango, El General and many more. There was total of 180 nominations in 32 categories. The nominees list includes Ricky Martin and Ricardo Arjona, with four nominations each; La India, Marc Anthony, Marco Antonio Solís, Conjunto Primavera, Olga Tañón and Joan Sebastian with three nominations each; Shakira and Thalía with two nominations; and Juanes, Alexandre Pires, Maná, Pepe Aguilar, Vicente Fernández, and many more.

== Presenters ==
- A.B. Quintanilla
- Rosalyn Sanchez
- Julio Iglesias Jr.
- Conjunto Primavera
- Banda el Recodo
- Jennifer Peña
- Ninel Conde
- Graciela Beltrán
- Millie Corretjer
- Giselle Blondet
- Mariana Seoane
- Niurka Marcos
- Aracely Arámbula
- Patricia Velásquez
- Marlene Favela
- Ricardo Alamo
- Eugenio Derbez

== Performers ==
- Ricky Martin
- La India
- Thalía
- Ricardo Arjona
- Marco Antonio Solís
- Sin Bandera
- La Oreja de Van Gogh
- Montez de Durango
- El General
- Víctor Manuelle
- Akwid
- Intocable

== List of nominees and winners ==
=== Award for Excellence ===
- Ricky Martin

=== Pop Category ===
S.No.	Sub - Category	Nominees	Winner
1)	Pop Album	Almas del Silencio - Ricky Martin; Estrella Guía - Alexandre Pires; Millie - Millie Corretjer; Rojo Relativo - Tiziano Ferro	Santo Pecado - Ricardo Arjona
2)	Pop Male Artist	Ricky Martin; Ricardo Arjona; Alexandre Pires	Juanes
3)	Pop Female Artist	Millie Corretjer; Soraya; Thalía	Shakira
4)	Pop Duo or Group	Maná; Juanes and Nelly Furtado; La Oreja de Van Gogh	Sin Bandera
5)	Pop New Artist	Alex Ubago; Ana Cristina; Axe Bahía; Contagious; Daniel René; Erika; Frankie J; Héctor; Juan Fernando Velasco; Julio Iglesias Jr.; Linda Bandry; Los Tres; Mía; Nadia; Roselyn Sánchez; Tiziano Ferro; Yahir	David Bisbal
6)	Pop Song	"No Me Enseñaste" - Thalía; "Tal Vez" - Ricky Martin; "Que Me Quedes Tu" - Shakira; "El Problema" - Ricardo Arjona	"Mariposa Traicionera" - Maná

=== Rock Category ===
S.No.	Sub - Category	Nominees	Winner
1)	Album of the Year	Dance and Dense Denso - Molotov; El Primer Instinto - Jaguares; Super Riddim Internacional Vol. 1 - El Gran Silencio; Alma en Fuego - Inspector	Libertad - La Ley
2)	Best Rock Performance	Molotov; Café Tacuba; El Gran Silencio	Jaguares
3)	Best New Artist	Circo; Inspector; Jorge Correa; La Zurda; Las Niñas; Natalia Lafourcade	Alessandra Rosaldo

=== Tropical Category ===
S.No.	Sub - Category	Nominees	Winner
1)	Album of the Year	Le Preguntaba a la Luna - Víctor Manuelle; Mi Alma y Corazón - La India; Escúchame - Joseph Fonseca; Estilo Propio - Son de Cali	A Puro Fuego - Olga Tañón
2)	Best Male Artist	Gilberto Santa Rosa; Víctor Manuelle; Jerry Rivera	Marc Anthony
3)	Best Female Artist	La India; Olga Tañón; Sophy	Celia Cruz
4)	Best Duo or Group	Son de Cali; Limi-T 21; El Gran Combo	Bacilos
5)	Best New Artist of the Year	Daniel; Puerto Raíces; Sexappeal; Son Callejero	Son de Cali
6)	Song of the Year	Si te Dijeron - Gilberto Santa Rosa; El Tonto Que No te Olvidó, - Víctor Manuelle; Sedúceme - La India; Herida Mortal - Jerry Rivera	Barco a La Deriva: Marc Anthony
7)	Best Merengue Performance	Joseph Fonseca; Limi-T 21; Grupo Manía	Olga Tañón
8)	Best Salsa Performance	Gilberto Santa Rosa; Víctor Manuelle; La India	Marc Anthony
9)	Best Salsa Performance	Elvis Martínez; Nueva Era; Aventura	Monchy y Alexandra

=== Regional Mexican Category ===
S.No.	Sub - Category	Nominees	Winner
1)	Regional Mexican Album	Situaciones - Palomo; Soy Así - Límite; Imperio - Tucanes de Tijuana; Afortunado - Joan Sebastian	Tu Amor o Tu Desprecio - Marco Antonio Solís
2)	Regiona Mexican Mal Artist	Joan Sebastian; Jorge Luis Cabrera; Pepe Aguilar	Marco Antonio Solís
3)	Regional Mexican Female Artist	Ninel Conde; Graciela Beltrán; Marisela	Jennifer Peña
4)	Regional Mexican Group or Duo	Conjunto Primavera; Palomo; Intocable	Kumbia Kings with Juan Gabriel and El Gran Silencio
5)	Regional Mexican New Artist	A.T.M; Adán Cuen; Ángel Garay; Banda Alameda; Big Pepe; Conjunto Pirámide; Erika; Hermanos Higuera; Isabela; Iván Díaz; Jimena; Joel Higuera con su Nuevo Grupo; K-Paz de la Sierra; Los Sombras del Malverde; Pepito; Punto y Aparte; Sandra; Santos Diablitos; Talismán; Temblor del Norte; Universales del Norte; Úrsula Sol; Víctor García; Violento; Zuly	La Onda
6)	Regional Mexican Song	“Una Vez Más" - Conjunto Primavera; "De Uno y De Todos Modos" - Palomo; "Muy a tu Manera" - Intocable; "Sueña" - Intocable	"No Tengo Dinero" - Kumbia Kings, Juan Gabriel, El Gran Silencio
7)	Best Tejano Performance	Control	La Onda Los Palominos
8)	Best Grupera Performance	Límite; Bronco El Gigante de América; Socios del Ritmo	Los Temerarios
9)	Best Ranchera Performance	Vicente Fernández; Marco Antonio Solís	Pepe Aguilar
10)	Best Banda Performance	El Coyote and su Banda Tierra Santa; Montez de Durango; Banda el Recodo	Joan Sebastian
11)	Best Norteño Performance	Conjunto Primavera; Palomo; Tucanes de Tijuana	Intocable

=== Urban Category ===
S.No.	Sub - Category	Nominees	Winner
1)	Album of the Year	La Prueba - Magic Juan; El Abayarde - Tego Calderón; Proyecto Akwid - Akwid; ¡Tomala! - Los Tetas	De Fiesta - El General
2)	Best Urban Performance	Magic Juan; Tego Calderón; Vico C	El General

=== Video of the Year ===
Nominees	Director	Winner
"No Es lo Mismo" - Alejandro Sanz; "Quitémonos la Ropa" - Alexandre Pires; "Perfume" - Bajafondo; "Dígale" - David Bisbal; "Hoy" - Gloria Estefan; "Minutos" - Ricardo Arjona; "Jaleo" - Ricky Martin	Jaume De Laiguana; J.L. Massa; Miguel Kohan; Rita Clip; Gloria Estefan and Emilio Estefan Jr.; Simón Brand; Kacho López and Carlos Pérez	"Bonito" - Jarabe de Palo (Dir. André Cruz); "Fitografía" - Juanes and Nelly Furtado (Dir. Picky Talarico)
