= Lo Nuestro Award for Tropical Album of the Year =

Latin music award

- Awarded for: Best Tropical Album
- Country: United States
- Presented by: Univision
- First award: 1989
- Currently held by: Marc Anthony (2014)

Highlights
- Most awards: Olga Tañón (4)
- Most nominations: Gilberto Santa Rosa (10)
- Website: univision.com/premiolonuestro

The Lo Nuestro Award for Tropical Album of the Year is an honor presented annually by American television network Univision at the Lo Nuestro Awards. The accolade was established to recognize the most talented performers of Latin music. The nominees and winners were originally selected by a voting poll conducted among program directors of Spanish-language radio stations in the United States and also based on chart performance on Billboard Latin music charts, with the results being tabulated and certified by the accounting firm Deloitte. However, since 2004, the winners are selected through an online survey. The trophy awarded is shaped in the form of a treble clef.

The award was first presented to Un Nuevo Despertar by Puerto Rican singer Lalo Rodríguez in 1989. Puerto Rican singer Jerry Rivera won for the album Cuenta Conmigo (1993), which exceeded the sales of Siembra by Willie Colón and Rubén Blades, the highest-selling salsa album at the time. Fellow Puerto Rican artist Olga Tañón holds the record for the most wins with four, for the albums Siente el Amor... (1995), Yo Por Ti (2002), A Puro Fuego (2004), and Una Nueva Mujer (2006). Cuban singer Gloria Estefan won in 1994 for Mi Tierra and in 1996 for Abriendo Puertas; both albums also earned the Grammy Award for Best Traditional Tropical Latin Album. American band Aventura, Venezuelan duo Chino & Nacho, Dominican duo Monchy & Alexandra, and Puerto Rican group Son by Four are the only musical ensembles to receive the accolade. In 2014, 3.0 by American singer Marc Anthony became the most recent recipient of the award. Puerto Rican singer Gilberto Santa Rosa is the most nominated artist without a win, with ten unsuccessful nominations.

== Winners and nominees ==
Listed below are the winners of the award for each year, as well as the other nominees.

Key	Meaning
‡	Indicates the winning album

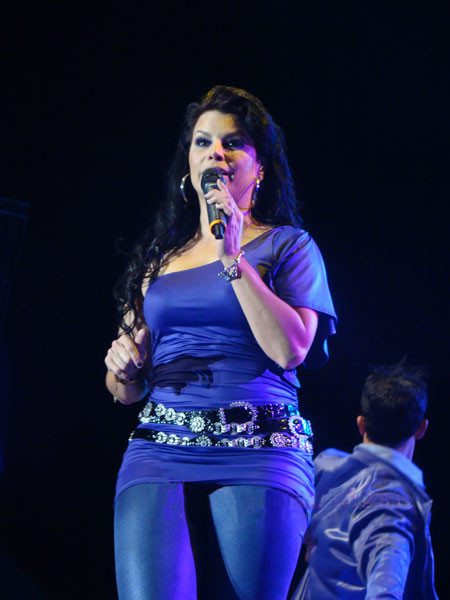
Puerto Rican American singer Olga Tañón (pictured in 2012), the most awarded performer, winning four times

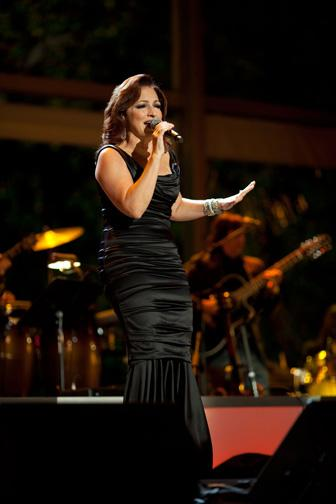
Cuban American singer Gloria Estefan (pictured in 2009), a two-time winner

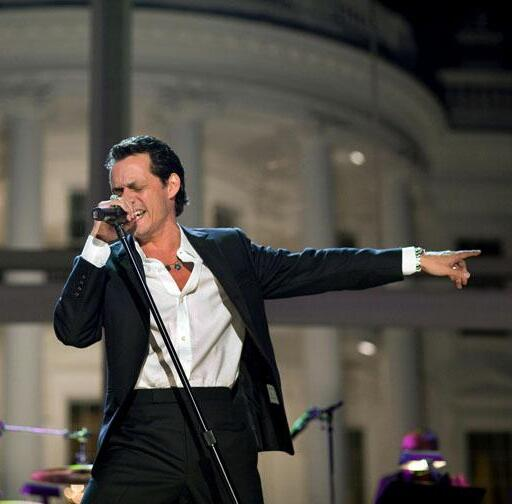
American singer Marc Anthony (pictured in 2009), a three-time winner

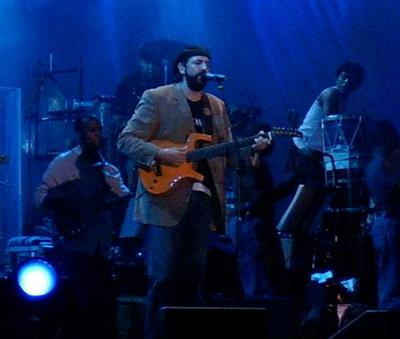
Dominican singer Juan Luis Guerra (pictured in 2005), six-time nominee and one-time winner

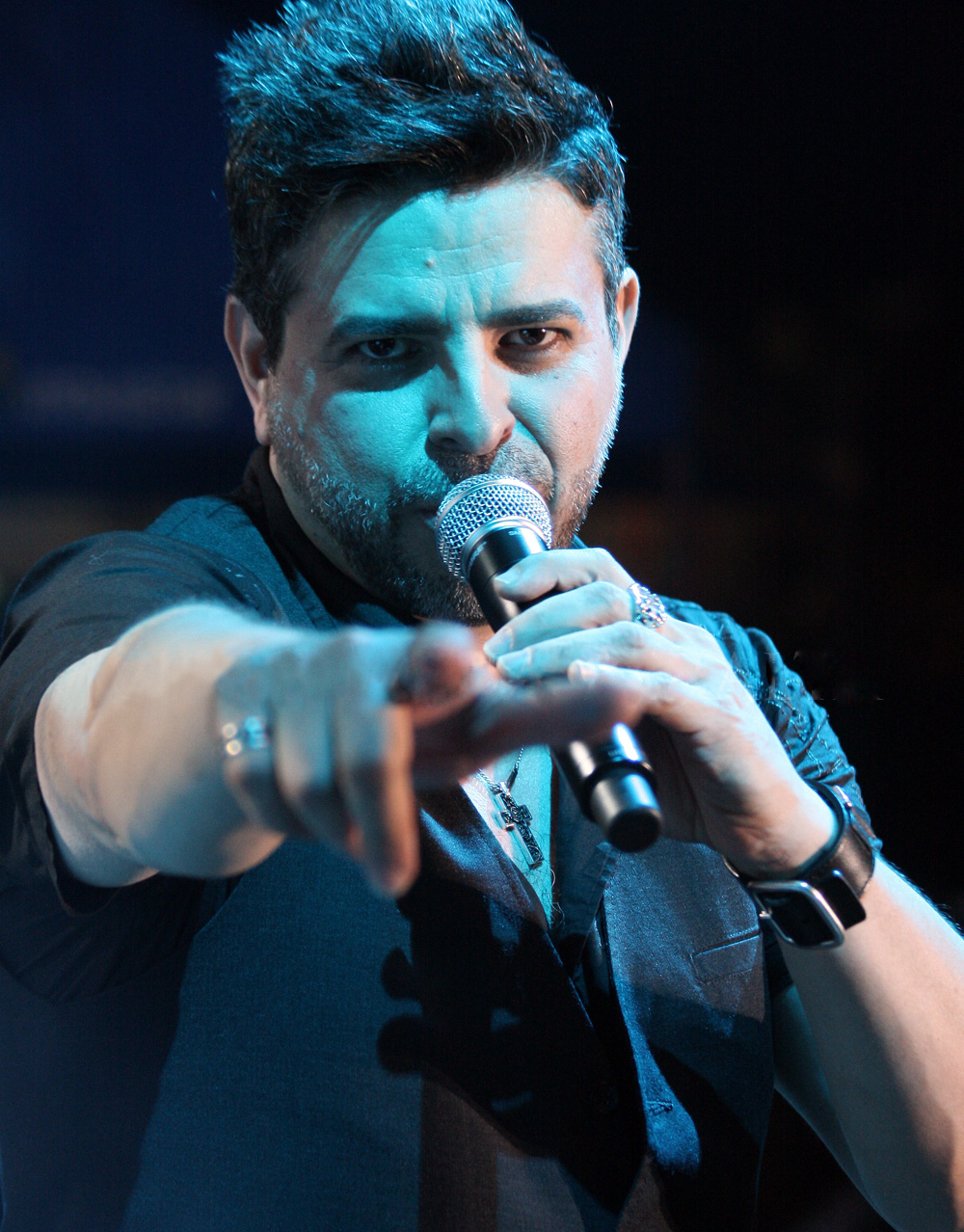
Nicaraguan performer Luis Enrique (pictured in 2010), five-time nominee and 1991 winner

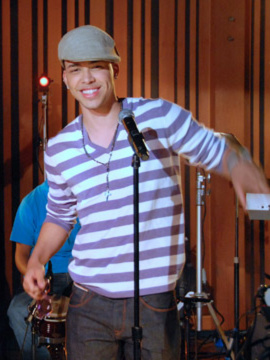
American singer Prince Royce (pictured in 2012), two-time winner

Year	Song	Performer(s)	Ref
1989 (1st)	Un Nuevo Despertar‡	Lalo Rodríguez	
1989 (1st)	Amor y Alegria	Luis Enrique	
1989 (1st)	El Original y Unico	Willie González	
1989 (1st)	Romántico y Sabroso	El Gran Combo de Puerto Rico	
1989 (1st)	Sigo Atrevido	Eddie Santiago	
1990 (2nd)	Mi Mundo‡	Luis Enrique	
1990 (2nd)	Amame	El Gran Combo de Puerto Rico	
1990 (2nd)	Es de Verdad	David Pabon	
1990 (2nd)	Invasión de la Privacidad	Eddie Santiago	
1990 (2nd)	Top Secret	Willie Colón	
1991 (3rd)	Los Príncipes de la Salsa‡	Luis Enrique and Eddie Santiago	
1991 (3rd)	Con la Música por Dentro	Nino Segarra	
1991 (3rd)	El Primero	Juan Manuel Lebrón	
1991 (3rd)	Punto de Vista	Gilberto Santa Rosa	
1991 (3rd)	Salsa Caliente del Japón	Orquesta de la Luz	
1992 (4th)	Bachata Rosa‡	Juan Luis Guerra y 440	
1992 (4th)	Abriendo Puertas	Jerry Rivera	
1992 (4th)	Fiesta Tropical	Banda Blanca	
1992 (4th)	Luces del Alma	Luis Enrique	
1992 (4th)	Soy el Mismo	Eddie Santiago	
1993 (5th)	Cuenta Conmigo‡	Jerry Rivera	
1993 (5th)	El Rey de los Soneros	Oscar D'León	
1993 (5th)	Perspectiva	Gilberto Santa Rosa	
1993 (5th)	Tito Rojas	Tito Rojas	
1993 (5th)	Sola	Olga Tañón	
1994 (6th)	Mi Tierra‡	Gloria Estefan	
1994 (6th)	Areito	Juan Luis Guerra y 440	
1994 (6th)	Cara de Niño	Jerry Rivera	
1994 (6th)	Mujer de Fuego	Olga Tañón	
1994 (6th)	Nace Aquí	Gilberto Santa Rosa	
1995 (7th)	Siente el Amor...‡	Olga Tañón	
1995 (7th)	Dicen Que Soy	La India	
1995 (7th)	Fogaraté	Juan Luis Guerra y 440	
1995 (7th)	Lo Nuevo y Lo Mejor	Jerry Rivera	
1995 (7th)	Mi Media Mitad	Rey Ruiz	
1996 (8th)	Abriendo Puertas‡	Gloria Estefan	
1996 (8th)	Éxitos y Más	Olga Tañón	
1996 (8th)	La Tierra del Olvido	Carlos Vives	
1996 (8th)	Los Dueños del Swing	Los Hermanos Rosario	
1996 (8th)	Todo a Su Tiempo	Marc Anthony	
1997 (9th)	Todo a Su Tiempo‡	Marc Anthony	
1997 (9th)	Auténtico	Manny Manuel	
1997 (9th)	Esencia	Gilberto Santa Rosa	
1997 (9th)	Fresco	Jerry Rivera	
1997 (9th)	La Makina	La Makina	
1998 (10th)	Sentimientos‡	Charlie Zaa	
1998 (10th)	Contra la Corriente	Marc Anthony	
1998 (10th)	De Corazón	Gilberto Santa Rosa	
1998 (10th)	Llévame Contigo	Olga Tañón	
1998 (10th)	Sobre el Fuego	La India	
1999 (11th)	Suavemente‡	Elvis Crespo	
1999 (11th)	De Otra Manera	Jerry Rivera	
1999 (11th)	Juntos	Gisselle and Sergio Vargas	
1999 (11th)	Leyenda 2	Alquimia	
1999 (11th)	Un Segundo Sentimiento	Charlie Zaa	
2000 (12th)	Píntame‡	Elvis Crespo	
2000 (12th)	El Amor de Mi Tierra	Carlos Vives	
2000 (12th)	Entrega	George Lamond	
2000 (12th)	Expresión	Gilberto Santa Rosa	
2000 (12th)	Inconfundible	Víctor Manuelle	
2000 (12th)	Masters of the Stage	Grupo Manía	
2001 (13th)	Son by Four‡	Son By Four	
2001 (13th)	Así Mismo Fue	Tito Nieves	
2001 (13th)	Celia Cruz and Friends: A Night of Salsa	Celia Cruz	
2001 (13th)	Fruta Prohibida	Sonora Tropicana	
2001 (13th)	Perdóname...Éxitos!	Gilberto Santa Rosa	
2002 (14th)	Yo Por Ti‡	Olga Tañón	
2002 (14th)	Intenso	Gilberto Santa Rosa	
2002 (14th)	Romántico	Gilberto Santa Rosa	
2002 (14th)	Wow! Flash	Elvis Crespo	
2002 (14th)	Yo Si Me Enamoré	Huey Dunbar	
2003 (15th)	La Negra Tiene Tumbao‡	Celia Cruz	
2003 (15th)	A Bailar Cumbia	Celso Piña y su Ronda Bogotá	
2003 (15th)	Bailando Bailando	Fito Olivares	
2003 (15th)	Confesiones	Monchy & Alexandra	
2003 (15th)	Déjame Entrar	Carlos Vives	
2003 (15th)	Libre	Marc Anthony	
2004 (16th)	A Puro Fuego‡	Olga Tañón	
2004 (16th)	Escuchame	Joseph Fonseca	
2004 (16th)	Estilo Propio	Son de Calí	
2004 (16th)	Le Preguntaba a la Luna	Víctor Manuelle	
2004 (16th)	Latin Songbird: Mi Alma y Corazón	La India	
2005 (17th)	Valió la Pena‡	Marc Anthony	
2005 (17th)	Indetenibles	Los Toros Band	
2005 (17th)	Love & Hate	Aventura	
2005 (17th)	Mi Tentación	Rey Ruiz	
2005 (17th)	Travesía	Víctor Manuelle	
2006 (18th)	Una Nueva Mujer‡	Olga Tañón	
2006 (18th)	Amanecer Contigo	Frankie Negrón	
2006 (18th)	Aquí Estamos y De Verdad	El Gran Combo de Puerto Rico	
2006 (18th)	Hasta El Fin	Monchy & Alexandra	
2006 (18th)	Ironía	Andy Andy	
2007 (19th)	Éxitos y Algo Más‡	Monchy & Alexandra	
2007 (19th)	Decisión Unánime	Víctor Manuelle	
2007 (19th)	I Love Salsa! (Edición Especial)	N'Klabe	
2007 (19th)	Sigo Siendo Yo	Marc Anthony	
2007 (19th)	Soy Diferente	La India	
2008 (20th)	K.O.B. Live‡	Aventura	
2008 (20th)	Arroz Con Habichuela	El Gran Combo de Puerto Rico	
2008 (20th)	Haciendo Historia	Xtreme	
2008 (20th)	La Llave de Mi Corazón	Juan Luis Guerra	
2008 (20th)	Soy Como Tú	Olga Tañón	
2009 (21st)	Kings of Bachata: Sold Out at Madison Square Garden‡	Aventura	
2009 (21st)	Contraste	Gilberto Santa Rosa	
2009 (21st)	Con Todas Las de Ganar	NG2	
2009 (21st)	La Nueva Escuela Nu School	N'Klabe	
2009 (21st)	Soy	Víctor Manuelle	
2010 (22nd)	The Last‡	Aventura	
2010 (22nd)	15 Años de Corazón	Grupo Manía	
2010 (22nd)	Ciclos	Luis Enrique	
2010 (22nd)	El Mensaje	Rey Ruiz	
2010 (22nd)	La Introduccion	Carlos & Alejandra	
2011 (23rd)	Mi Niña Bonita‡	Chino & Nacho	
2011 (23rd)	A Son de Guerra	Juan Luis Guerra	
2011 (23rd)	Huey Dunbar IV	Huey Dunbar	
2011 (23rd)	Prince Royce	Prince Royce	
2011 (23rd)	Sin Salsa No Hay Paraíso	El Gran Combo de Puerto Rico	
2012 (24th)	Invencible‡	Tito El Bambino	
2012 (24th)	Indestructible	Elvis Crespo	
2012 (24th)	Oblígame	Héctor Acosta	
2012 (24th)	Sigo Aquí	Charlie Cruz	
2012 (24th)	Soy y Seré	Luis Enrique	
2013 (25th)	Phase II‡	Prince Royce	
2013 (25th)	Busco un Pueblo	Víctor Manuelle	
2013 (25th)	Formula, Vol. 1	Romeo Santos	
2013 (25th)	Los Monsters	Elvis Crespo	
2013 (25th)	Supremo	Chino & Nacho	
2014 (26th)	3.0	Marc Anthony	
2014 (26th)	Amor Total	Toby Love	
2014 (26th)	Corazón Profundo	Carlos Vives	
2014 (26th)	Leslie Grace	Leslie Grace	
2014 (26th)	Me Llamaré Tuyo	Víctor Manuelle	
2015 (27th)	Formula, Vol. 2	Romeo Santos	
2015 (27th)	Party & Dance	Limi-T 21	
2015 (27th)	Único	Joey Montana	
2015 (27th)	Soy el Mismo	Prince Royce	
2015 (27th)	Más Corazón Profundo	Carlos Vives	
2016 (28th)	Soy el Mismo (Deluxe Edition)	Prince Royce	
2016 (28th)	Radio Universo	Chino & Nacho	
2016 (28th)	Todo Tiene Su Hora	Juan Luis Guerra	
2016 (28th)	Géminis	Karlos Rosé	
2016 (28th)	Que Suenen los Tambores	Víctor Manuelle	
2017 (29th)	Visualízate	Gente de Zona	
2017 (29th)	Tiempo	24 Horas	
2017 (29th)	Conexión	Fonseca	
2017 (29th)	35 Aniversario	Grupo Niche	
2017 (29th)	Mi Mejor Regalo	Charlie Zaa	

== Multiple wins/nominations ==
Number	Performer(s)
Wins
4	Olga Tañón
3	Marc Anthony
3	Aventura
2	Elvis Crespo
2	Gloria Estefan
2	Luis Enrique
2	Prince Royce
Nominations
10	Gilberto Santa Rosa
9	Olga Tañón
8	Víctor Manuelle
7	Marc Anthony
6	Juan Luis Guerra
6	Jerry Rivera
5	Carlos Vives
5	Elvis Crespo
5	El Gran Combo de Puerto Rico
5	Luis Enrique
4	Aventura
4	La India
4	Eddie Santiago
4	Prince Royce
3	Charlie Zaa
3	Chino & Nacho
3	Monchy & Alexandra
3	Rey Ruiz
2	Celia Cruz
2	Huey Dunbar
2	Gloria Estefan
2	Grupo Manía
2	N'Klabe
2	Romeo Santos

== See also ==
- Grammy Award for Best Merengue Album
- Grammy Award for Best Tropical Latin Album
- Grammy Award for Best Salsa Album
- Grammy Award for Best Salsa/Merengue Album
- Latin Grammy Award for Best Contemporary Tropical Album
- Latin Grammy Award for Best Merengue Album
- Latin Grammy Award for Best Salsa Album
- Latin Grammy Award for Best Tropical Fusion Album
- Latin Grammy Award for Best Traditional Tropical Album
