= 1991 in Latin music =

This is a list of notable events in Latin music (music from Spanish- and Portuguese-speaking areas from Latin America, Europe, and the United States) that took place in 1991.

== Events ==
- February 20 – The 33rd Annual Grammy Awards are held at the Radio City Music Hall in New York City.
  - José Feliciano wins the Grammy Award for Best Latin Pop Performance for his song "¿Por Qué Te Tengo Que Olvidar?"
  - Tito Puente wins the Grammy Award for Best Tropical Performance for his song "Lambada Timbales"
  - The Texas Tornados wins the Grammy Award for Best Mexican-American Performance for their song "Soy de San Luis".
- May 23 – The 4th Annual Lo Nuestro Awards are held at the James L. Knight Center in Miami, Florida. Mexican singer Ana Gabriel and Dominican group Juan Luis Guerra & 4.40 are the most awarded artists with three wins.
- November 19 – Luis Miguel releases Romance, a collection of boleros previously recorded by other artists. The album's success led to a resurgence of interest in the bolero genre in the 1990s.

== Bands formed ==
- Grupo Mojado
- Esmeralda
- Lalo y Los Descalzos
- Tecno Banda
- Alex d'Castro
- Antonio Cruz
- Xavier

== Number-one albums and singles by country ==
- List of number-one albums of 1991 (Spain)
- List of number-one singles of 1991 (Spain)
- List of number-one Billboard Top Latin Albums of 1991
- List of number-one Billboard Hot Latin Tracks of 1991

== Awards ==
- 1991 Premio Lo Nuestro
- 1991 Tejano Music Awards

== Albums released ==
=== First-quarter ===
==== January ====
Day	Title	Artist	Genre(s)	Singles	Label
8	Viva Rosario	Willie Rosario	Guaguanco, Merengue, Latin Jazz, Salsa		Bronco

==== February ====
Day	Title	Artist	Genre(s)	Singles	Label
28	Que Nada Nos Separe	Mijares	Ballad		Capitol/EMI Latin

=== Second-quarter ===
==== April ====
Day	Title	Artist	Genre(s)	Singles	Label
8	En Cada Lugar	Angel Javier	Salsa		EMI, Capitol/EMI Latin
30	Amada Más Que Nunca	Daniela Romo			Capitol/EMI Latin

==== June ====
Day	Title	Artist	Genre(s)	Singles	Label
4	Borrasco	Ottmar Liebert			
10	Magia	Shakira	Latin Pop		Columbia
Unknown Date	Aidalai	Mecano	Latin, Synth-Pop, Ballad		Ariola

=== Third-quarter ===
==== July ====
Day	Title	Artist	Genre(s)	Singles	Label
1	1986	La Mafia			Discos CBS International
1	Live	La Mafia			CBS
1	Enter the Future	La Mafia	Tejano		Capitol/EMI Latin
1	On the Rise	La Fiebre	Tejano		Capitol/EMI Latin
1	El Emigrado	Juan Valentín			
1	Roñas del Alma	Los Hermanos Mattar			
1	Sopa de Caracol	Banda Blanca	Merengue		Red Bullet
15	Salvaje '88	Cano Estremera	Guaguanco, Merengue, Salsa		CEG Records, CEG Records
15	Hot	La Patrulla 15	Merengue		Top Ten Hits
19	Dos	Myriam Hernández	Ballad, Vocal		Capitol Records, Capitol Records
19	Arriba el Norte y Arriba el Sur	Vicente Fernández and Ramón Ayala			
30	Sin Comparación	Willie González	Salsa		Sonotone, Sonotone
Unknown Date	Este Mundo	Gipsy Kings	Flamenco, Rumba		Elektra Musician

==== August ====
Day	Title	Artist	Genre(s)	Singles	Label
22	Menealo	Fransheska			Ariola

==== September ====
Day	Title	Artist	Genre(s)	Singles	Label
10	Merengue Con Un Toque De Clase	Chantelle	Merengue		WEA Latina
15	Tu Ángel de la Guarda	Gloria Trevi	Alternative Rock		Ariola
20	Os Grãos	Os Paralamas do Sucesso	Pop rock		EMI

=== Fourth-quarter ===
==== October ====
Day	Title	Artist	Genre(s)	Singles	Label
1	Solo	Alex d'Castro	Salsa		TH-Rodven
1	Pelusión of Milk	Luis Alberto Spinetta			
18	Oscar '86	Oscar D'León	Salsa		Top Hits, Top Hits
18	A Través de Tus Ojos	Los Bukis	Ballad		Fonovisa
18	Mundo de Cristal	Thalía	Ballad, Pop rock		Melody

=== Unknown date ===
Title	Artist	Genre(s)	Singles	Label
Yo Me Quedo	Tony Vega	Salsa		RMM Records, Sony Discos
Corazones	Los Prisioneros	Synth-Pop		Capitol/EMI Latin
Poets & Angels: Music 4 the Holidays	Ottmar Liebert	Flamenco	"Deck the Halls"	Higher Octave Music
Con Amor Eterno...	Pandora	Vocal, Ballad		Capitol/EMI Latin
Barroco	Raúl di Blasio	Easy Listening	"Aguas de Invierno" "Otoñal" "Barroco"	BMG International U.S. Latin
Xuxa 2	Xuxa	Vocal		Globo Records
Sopa de Caracol	Los Fabulosos Cadillacs	Ska		Epic, Epic
Incansables	Los Tigres del Norte	Norteno		Fonovisa, Fonovisa
Caminando	Rubén Blades	Salsa, Pop rock		Discos International
Cosas del Amor	Vikki Carr			Sony, Discos International
Mambo	Azúcar Moreno	Flamenco		Sony Latin
Mi México	Ana Gabriel	Mariachi		Sony Discos, Sony
Viviendo Deprisa	Alejandro Sanz	Acoustic, Soft Rock, Latin, Pop rock	"Los dos Cogidos de la Mano" "Pisando Fuerte" "Lo Que Fui Es Lo Que Soy"	WEA Latina
Muevelo Con El General	El General	Afro-Cuban, Pop Rap, Ragga HipHop, Reggae-Pop		RCA
Estas Tocando Fuego	La Mafia	Tejano, Cumbia		Sony Discos
Romanticamente	Yndio			Capitol Records
Uno Mismo	Tony Vega	Salsa		RMM Records, Sony Discos Inc.
A Voluntad del Cielo	Camilo Sesto	Vocal, Ballad	"Amor Mío, ¿Qué Me Has Hecho?"	Ariola, BMG International U.S. Latin
Perspectiva	Gilberto Santa Rosa	Salsa, Guaguanco, Son	"Conciencia" "Algo Especial"	Discos International
El circo	Maldita Vecindad	Alternative Rock, Ska, Punk		BMG International U.S. Latin, Ariola
Tudo Ao Mesmo Tempo Agora	Titãs	New Wave, Pop rock		WEA
Ricky Martin (1991)	Ricky Martin	Latin, Synth-Pop, Dance-Pop, Ballad		Sony, Sony Discos
Romance	Luis Miguel	Bolero		WEA Latina
Nada Se Compara Contigo	Álvaro Torres	Ballad		Capitol/EMI Latin
Por Fin Juntos	Paloma San Basilio and Plácido Domingo	Vocal, Classical		Hispavox
Salvaje y Tierno	Bronco	Cumbia, Norteno, Ballad		Fonovisa
A Mi Viejo	Rocío Banquells			Capitol/EMI Latin
V	Legião Urbana	Pop rock, Alternative Rock, Folk Rock		EMI, EMI
Amor Sin Dueño	Alejandra Ávalos	Ballad		WEA
Brasil Nordeste	Zé Ramalho	Forró, MPB		Columbia
En el Último Lugar del Mundo	Ricardo Montaner	Ballad		TH-Rodven
Una Historia Diferente	Luis Enrique	Salsa		Sony Discos
Entre la Espada y la Pared	Nino Segarra	Salsa		Musical Productions, Musical Productions
Los Reyes De La Punta	Los Roland's			

== Best-selling records ==
=== Best-selling albums ===
The following is a list of the top 5 best-selling Latin albums of 1991 in the United States in the categories of Latin pop, Regional Mexican, and Tropical/salsa, according to Billboard.

Category	Rank	Album	Artist
Latin pop	1	En Vivo	Ana Gabriel
Latin pop	2	Dos	Myriam Hernández
Latin pop	3	En el Palacio de Bellas Artes	Juan Gabriel
Latin pop	4	Tiempo de Vals	Chayanne
Latin pop	5	Amada Más Que Nunca	Daniela Romo
Regional Mexican	1	Amigo	Bronco
Regional Mexican	2	Para Nuestra Gente	Mazz
Regional Mexican	3	Mexico Voz y Sentimiento	Various artists
Regional Mexican	4	Ven Conmigo	Selena y los Dinos
Regional Mexican	5	De Lo Nuevo De Lo Mejor	Los Temerarios
Tropical/Salsa	1	Bachata Rosa	Juan Luis Guerra y la 4.40
Tropical/Salsa	2	Luces del Alma	Luis Enrique
Tropical/Salsa	3	Abriendo Puertas	Jerry Rivera
Tropical/Salsa	4	Baile Punta	Banda Blanca
Tropical/Salsa	5	En Cada Lugar	Angel Javier

=== Best-performing songs ===
The following is a list of the top 10 best-performing Latin songs in the United States in 1991, according to Billboard.

Rank	Single	Artist
1	"Es Demasiado Tarde"	Ana Gabriel
2	"Todo, Todo, Todo"	Daniela Romo
3	"Mi Deseo"	Los Bukis
4	"Cosas del Amor"	Vikki Carr and Ana Gabriel
5	"Sopa de Caracol"	Banda Blanca
6	"Te Pareces Tanto a Él"	Myriam Hernández
7	"Déjame Llorar"	Ricardo Montaner
8	"No Basta"	Franco De Vita
9	"Ahora"	Ana Gabriel
10	"No He Podido Verte"	Emmanuel

== Births ==
- February 1 – Martha Heredia, Dominican singer
- February 14 – Karol G, Colombian reggaeton singer
- February 17 – Raymix, Mexican cumbia singer
- March 13 – Luan Santana, Brazilian sertanejo singer
- March 22 – Sophia Abrahão, Brazilian actress and singer
- April 4 – Lucas Lucco, Brazilian singer, songwriter, and actor
- May 2 – Farruko, Puerto Rican reggaeton singer
- July 3 – Rolf Sanchez, Dutch salsa singer
- July 31 – Filipa Azevedo, Portuguese singer
- September 9 – Amanda Magalhães, Brazilian actress and singer
- October 10 – Lali Espósito, Argentine pop singer

== Deaths ==
- April 29 – Gonzaguinha, Brazilian MPB singer, 45 (car accident)
- August 17 – Sola, Mexican singer
- September 22 – Tino Casal, Spanish rock singer, 41 (car accident)
