= List of Billboard Tropical Albums number ones from the 1990s =

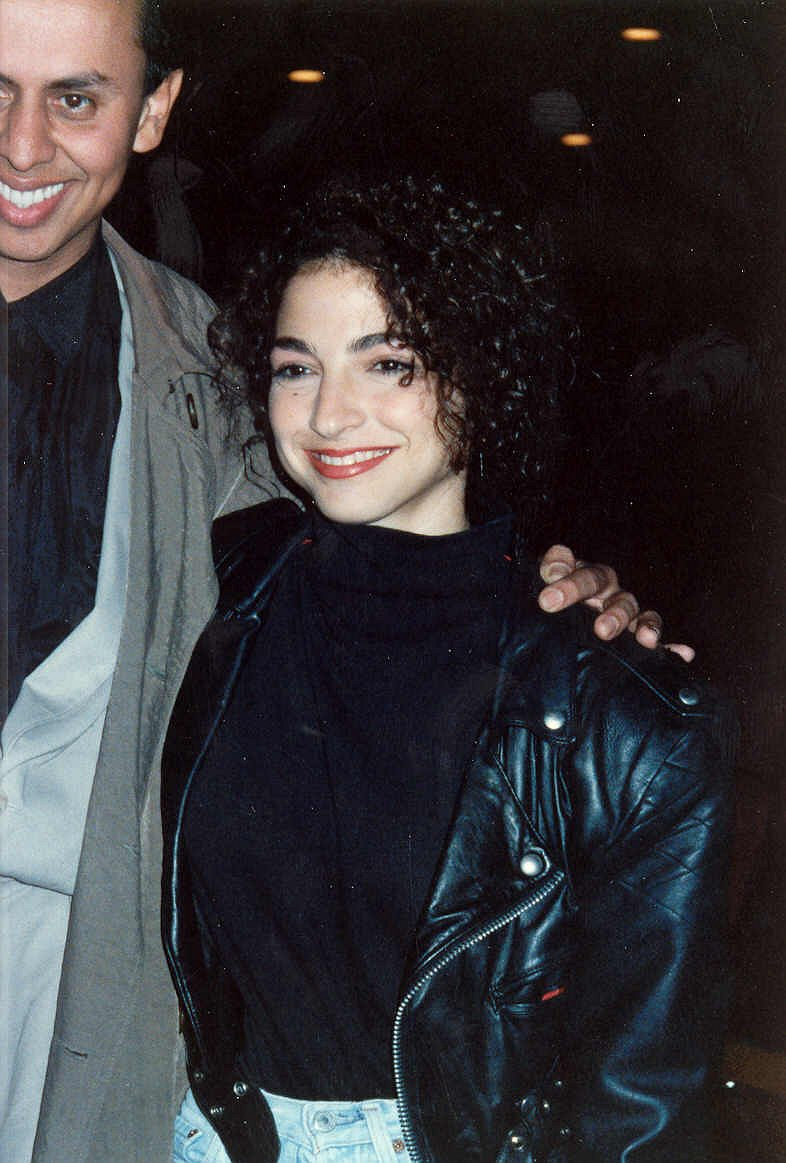
Gloria Estefan (pictured in 1990) had the longest-running number one tropical album of the 1990s with Mi Tierra (1993).

Tropical Albums (formerly known as Tropical/Salsa Latin Albums) is a chart that ranks the bestselling tropical albums in the United States. Initially, the chart was published on a fortnightly basis with its positions being compiled by sales data from Latin music retailers and distributors. The methodology for the chart was amended with effect from the week of July 10, 1993, to have its sales compiled by Nielsen SoundScan, based on electronic point of sale data. At the same time, the chart began to be published weekly and became a sub chart of Top Latin Albums (which was established in the same week as the methodology change). Billboard also imposed a linguistic rule requiring an album to have 70% of its content in Spanish (later reduced to 50%) to be eligible to rank on the chart.

The first number one of the decade was Mi Mundo (1989) by Luis Enrique, which had been in the top spot since the issue dated October 7, 1989, and was the bestselling tropical album of 1990. Enrique, Marc Anthony, Jerry Rivera, and Eddie Santiago tied for the most number-one albums of the decade with three records. Rivera's album Cuenta Conmigo (1992), which was the bestselling tropical album of 1993, has been described by several sources as the bestselling salsa album since Siembra (1978) by Willie Colón and Rubén Blades. Todo a Su Tiempo (1995) by Anthony became the first salsa album to receive a gold certification from the Recording Industry Association of America (RIAA). Anthony also had the final number-one album of the decade with his greatest hits album, Desde un Principio: From the Beginning (1999).

Merengue music, which rivaled salsa music in the 1980s, saw its popularity rise in the 1990s. One of the merengue acts to achieve number one was Elvis Crespo, who had the bestselling tropical album of 1999 with his debut album, Suavemente (1998). In addition to performing merengue, Dominican Republic singer-songwriter Juan Luis Guerra was credited with bringing bachata's success outside of the working class from his country with his fifth studio album, Bachata Rosa (1990), which was the bestselling tropical album of 1991. Similarly, Carlos Vives brought the popularity of vallenato music outside of his native Colombia, and achieved his first number one on the Tropical Albums chart with La Tierra del Olvido (1995). Cuban music saw a resurgence in mainstream interest due to the popularity of Mi Tierra (1993) by Gloria Estefan and the 1997 self-titled album by Buena Vista Social Club, which both sold millions of copies. Mi Tierra was the longest-running number one tropical album of the 1990s with 94 weeks at the top of the chart. Buena Vista Social Club is the second bestselling Latin album of all time in the US as of 2017, after Dreaming of You (1995) by Selena, and holds the Guinness World Record as the bestselling world album of all time.

== Chart history ==
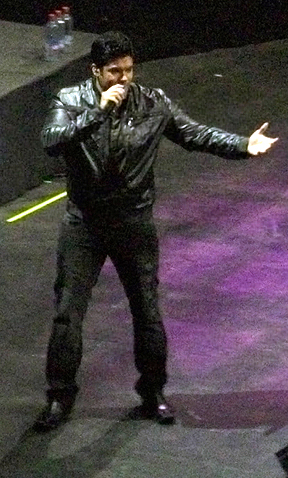
Cuenta Conmigo (1992) by Jerry Rivera (pictured in 2010) has been described by several sources as the bestselling salsa album since Siembra (1978) by Willie Colón and Rubén Blades.

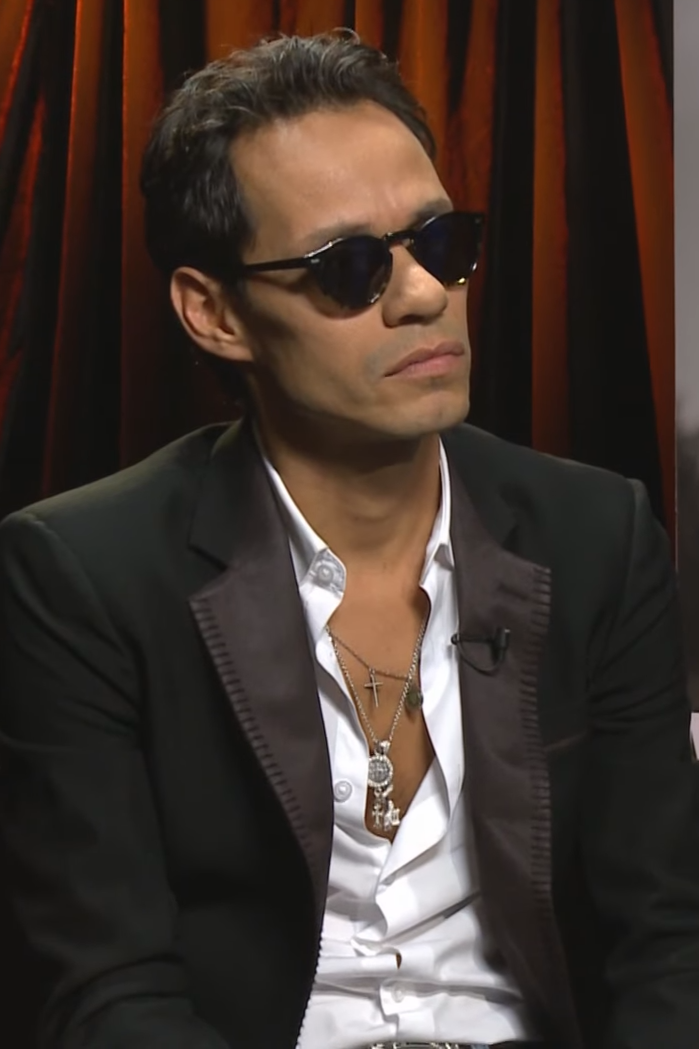
Todo a Su Tiempo (1995) by Marc Anthony (pictured in 2019) was the first salsa album to be certified gold by the RIAA.

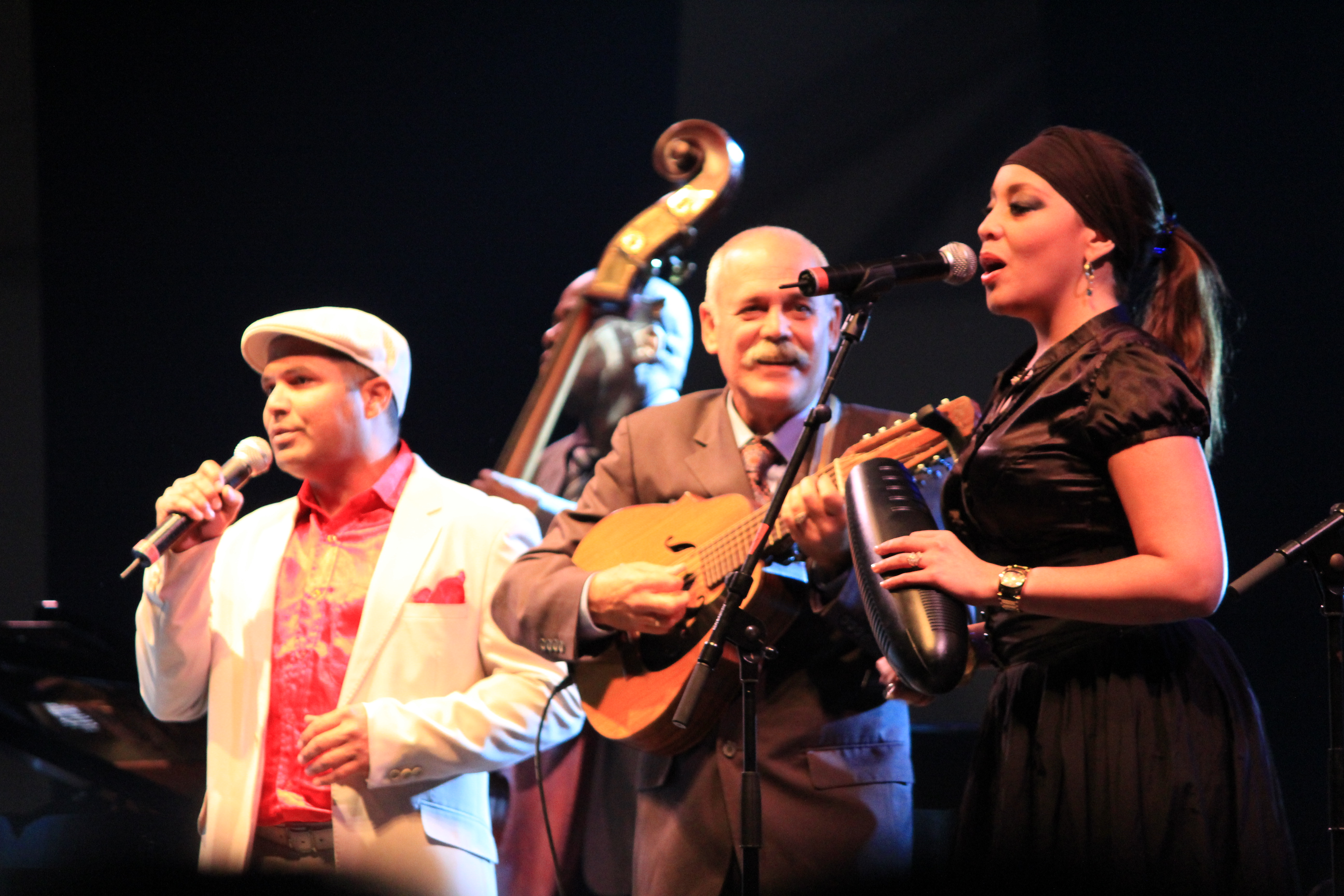
Buena Vista Social Club's (pictured in 2012) 1997 self-titled album is the second bestselling Latin album of all-time in the US.

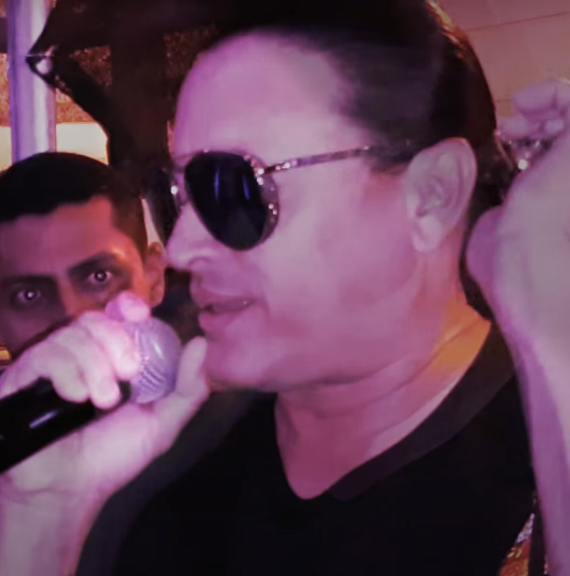
Elvis Crespo (pictured in 2018) had the bestselling tropical album of 1999 with Suavemente (1998).

Key
†	Indicates the number one on Billboard's year-end tropical albums chart

Chart history
Issue date	Album	Artist(s)	Ref.
January 13, 1990	Mi Mundo †	Luis Enrique	
January 27, 1990	Más Grande Que Nunca	Frankie Ruiz	
February 10, 1990	Mi Mundo †	Luis Enrique	
February 24, 1990	Más Grande Que Nunca	Frankie Ruiz	
March 10, 1990	Mi Mundo †	Luis Enrique	
March 24, 1990	Mi Mundo †	Luis Enrique	
April 7, 1990	New Wave Salsa	Eddie Santiago	
April 21, 1990	New Wave Salsa	Eddie Santiago	
May 5, 1990	New Wave Salsa	Eddie Santiago	
May 19, 1990	Mi Mundo †	Luis Enrique	
June 2, 1990	Mi Mundo †	Luis Enrique	
June 16, 1990	Mi Mundo †	Luis Enrique	
June 30, 1990	Mi Mundo †	Luis Enrique	
July 14, 1990	Mi Mundo †	Luis Enrique	
July 28, 1990	El Primero	Juan Manuel Lebrón	
August 11, 1990	El Primero	Juan Manuel Lebrón	
August 25, 1990	Los Príncipes de la Salsa	Luis Enrique and Eddie Santiago	
September 8, 1990	Los Príncipes de la Salsa	Luis Enrique and Eddie Santiago	
September 22, 1990	Los Príncipes de la Salsa	Luis Enrique and Eddie Santiago	
October 6, 1990	Los Príncipes de la Salsa	Luis Enrique and Eddie Santiago	
October 20, 1990	Los Príncipes de la Salsa	Luis Enrique and Eddie Santiago	
November 3, 1990	Salsa Caliente del Japón	Orquesta de la Luz	
November 17, 1990	Salsa Caliente del Japón	Orquesta de la Luz	
December 1, 1990	Salsa Caliente del Japón	Orquesta de la Luz	
December 15, 1990	Salsa Caliente del Japón	Orquesta de la Luz	
December 29, 1990	Salsa Caliente del Japón	Orquesta de la Luz	
January 12, 1991	Bachata Rosa †	Juan Luis Guerra	
January 26, 1991	Bachata Rosa †	Juan Luis Guerra	
February 9, 1991	Bachata Rosa †	Juan Luis Guerra	
February 23, 1991	Bachata Rosa †	Juan Luis Guerra	
March 9, 1991	Bachata Rosa †	Juan Luis Guerra	
March 23, 1991	En Cada Lugar	Angel Javier	
April 6, 1991	Bachata Rosa †	Juan Luis Guerra	
April 20, 1991	Baile Punta	Banda Blanca	
May 4, 1991	Baile Punta	Banda Blanca	
May 18, 1991	Baile Punta	Banda Blanca	
June 1, 1991	Bachata Rosa †	Juan Luis Guerra	
June 15, 1991	Bachata Rosa †	Juan Luis Guerra	
June 29, 1991	Bachata Rosa †	Juan Luis Guerra	
July 13, 1991	Bachata Rosa †	Juan Luis Guerra	
July 27, 1991	Bachata Rosa †	Juan Luis Guerra	
August 10, 1991	Bachata Rosa †	Juan Luis Guerra	
August 24, 1991	Abriendo Puertas	Jerry Rivera	
September 7, 1991	Abriendo Puertas	Jerry Rivera	
September 21, 1991	Abriendo Puertas	Jerry Rivera	
October 5, 1991	Abriendo Puertas	Jerry Rivera	
October 19, 1991	Soy el Mismo	Eddie Santiago	
November 2, 1991	Soy el Mismo	Eddie Santiago	
November 16, 1991	Soy el Mismo	Eddie Santiago	
November 30, 1991	Soy el Mismo	Eddie Santiago	
December 14, 1991	Soy el Mismo	Eddie Santiago	
December 28, 1991	Soy el Mismo	Eddie Santiago	
January 11, 1992	Perspectiva †	Gilberto Santa Rosa	
January 25, 1992	Perspectiva †	Gilberto Santa Rosa	
February 8, 1992	Perspectiva †	Gilberto Santa Rosa	
February 22, 1992	Perspectiva †	Gilberto Santa Rosa	
March 7, 1992	Perspectiva †	Gilberto Santa Rosa	
March 21, 1992	Perspectiva †	Gilberto Santa Rosa	
April 4, 1992	Perspectiva †	Gilberto Santa Rosa	
April 18, 1992	Perspectiva †	Gilberto Santa Rosa	
May 2, 1992	Una Historia Diferente	Luis Enrique	
May 16, 1992	Perspectiva †	Gilberto Santa Rosa	
May 30, 1992	Perspectiva †	Gilberto Santa Rosa	
June 13, 1992	The Mambo Kings	Soundtrack	
June 27, 1992	The Mambo Kings	Soundtrack	
July 11, 1992	Cuenta Conmigo	Jerry Rivera	
July 25, 1992	Cuenta Conmigo	Jerry Rivera	
August 8, 1992	Cuenta Conmigo	Jerry Rivera	
August 22, 1992	Miami Band	Miami Band	
September 5, 1992	Miami Band	Miami Band	
September 19, 1992	Cuenta Conmigo	Jerry Rivera	
October 3, 1992	Cuenta Conmigo	Jerry Rivera	
October 17, 1992	Cuenta Conmigo	Jerry Rivera	
October 31, 1992	El Rey de los Soneros	Oscar D'León	
November 14, 1992	Cuenta Conmigo	Jerry Rivera	
November 28, 1992	El Rey de los Soneros	Oscar D'León	
December 12, 1992	El Rey de los Soneros	Oscar D'León	
December 26, 1992	Cuenta Conmigo †	Jerry Rivera	
January 9, 1993	Cuenta Conmigo †	Jerry Rivera	
January 23, 1993	Cuenta Conmigo †	Jerry Rivera	
February 6, 1993	Cuenta Conmigo †	Jerry Rivera	
February 20, 1993	Cuenta Conmigo †	Jerry Rivera	
March 6, 1993	Cuenta Conmigo †	Jerry Rivera	
March 20, 1993	Cuenta Conmigo †	Jerry Rivera	
April 3, 1993	Cuenta Conmigo †	Jerry Rivera	
April 17, 1993	Cuenta Conmigo †	Jerry Rivera	
May 1, 1993	Cuenta Conmigo †	Jerry Rivera	
May 15, 1993	Cuenta Conmigo †	Jerry Rivera	
May 29, 1993	Cuenta Conmigo †	Jerry Rivera	
June 12, 1993	Cuenta Conmigo †	Jerry Rivera	
June 26, 1993	Rey Ruiz	Rey Ruiz	
July 10, 1993	The Mambo Kings	Soundtrack	
July 17, 1993	Mi Tierra †	Gloria Estefan	
July 24, 1993	Mi Tierra †	Gloria Estefan	
July 31, 1993	Mi Tierra †	Gloria Estefan	
August 7, 1993	Mi Tierra †	Gloria Estefan	
August 14, 1993	Mi Tierra †	Gloria Estefan	
August 21, 1993	Mi Tierra †	Gloria Estefan	
August 28, 1993	Mi Tierra †	Gloria Estefan	
September 4, 1993	Mi Tierra †	Gloria Estefan	
September 11, 1993	Mi Tierra †	Gloria Estefan	
September 18, 1993	Mi Tierra †	Gloria Estefan	
September 25, 1993	Mi Tierra †	Gloria Estefan	
October 2, 1993	Mi Tierra †	Gloria Estefan	
October 9, 1993	Mi Tierra †	Gloria Estefan	
October 16, 1993	Mi Tierra †	Gloria Estefan	
October 23, 1993	Mi Tierra †	Gloria Estefan	
October 30, 1993	Mi Tierra †	Gloria Estefan	
November 6, 1993	Mi Tierra †	Gloria Estefan	
November 13, 1993	Mi Tierra †	Gloria Estefan	
November 20, 1993	Mi Tierra †	Gloria Estefan	
November 27, 1993	Mi Tierra †	Gloria Estefan	
December 4, 1993	Mi Tierra †	Gloria Estefan	
December 11, 1993	Mi Tierra †	Gloria Estefan	
December 18, 1993	Mi Tierra †	Gloria Estefan	
December 25, 1993	Mi Tierra †	Gloria Estefan	
January 1, 1994	Mi Tierra †	Gloria Estefan	
January 8, 1994	Mi Tierra †	Gloria Estefan	
January 15, 1994	Mi Tierra †	Gloria Estefan	
January 22, 1994	Mi Tierra †	Gloria Estefan	
January 29, 1994	Mi Tierra †	Gloria Estefan	
February 5, 1994	Mi Tierra †	Gloria Estefan	
February 12, 1994	Mi Tierra †	Gloria Estefan	
February 19, 1994	Mi Tierra †	Gloria Estefan	
February 26, 1994	Mi Tierra †	Gloria Estefan	
March 5, 1994	Mi Tierra †	Gloria Estefan	
March 12, 1994	Mi Tierra †	Gloria Estefan	
March 19, 1994	Mi Tierra †	Gloria Estefan	
March 26, 1994	Mi Tierra †	Gloria Estefan	
April 2, 1994	Mi Tierra †	Gloria Estefan	
April 9, 1994	Mi Tierra †	Gloria Estefan	
April 16, 1994	Mi Tierra †	Gloria Estefan	
April 23, 1994	Mi Tierra †	Gloria Estefan	
April 30, 1994	Mi Tierra †	Gloria Estefan	
May 7, 1994	Mi Tierra †	Gloria Estefan	
May 14, 1994	Mi Tierra †	Gloria Estefan	
May 21, 1994	Mi Tierra †	Gloria Estefan	
May 28, 1994	Mi Tierra †	Gloria Estefan	
June 4, 1994	Mi Tierra †	Gloria Estefan	
June 11, 1994	Mi Tierra †	Gloria Estefan	
June 18, 1994	Mi Tierra †	Gloria Estefan	
June 25, 1994	Mi Tierra †	Gloria Estefan	
July 2, 1994	Mi Tierra †	Gloria Estefan	
July 9, 1994	Mi Tierra †	Gloria Estefan	
July 16, 1994	Mi Tierra †	Gloria Estefan	
July 23, 1994	Mi Tierra †	Gloria Estefan	
July 30, 1994	Mi Tierra †	Gloria Estefan	
August 6, 1994	Mi Tierra †	Gloria Estefan	
August 13, 1994	Mi Tierra †	Gloria Estefan	
August 20, 1994	Mi Tierra †	Gloria Estefan	
August 27, 1994	Mi Tierra †	Gloria Estefan	
September 3, 1994	Mi Tierra †	Gloria Estefan	
September 10, 1994	Mi Tierra †	Gloria Estefan	
September 17, 1994	Mi Tierra †	Gloria Estefan	
September 24, 1994	Mi Tierra †	Gloria Estefan	
October 1, 1994	Mi Tierra †	Gloria Estefan	
October 8, 1994	Mi Tierra †	Gloria Estefan	
October 15, 1994	Mi Tierra †	Gloria Estefan	
October 22, 1994	Mi Tierra †	Gloria Estefan	
October 29, 1994	Mi Tierra †	Gloria Estefan	
November 5, 1994	Mi Tierra †	Gloria Estefan	
November 12, 1994	Mi Tierra †	Gloria Estefan	
November 19, 1994	Mi Tierra †	Gloria Estefan	
November 26, 1994	Mi Tierra †	Gloria Estefan	
December 3, 1994	Mi Tierra †	Gloria Estefan	
December 10, 1994	Mi Tierra †	Gloria Estefan	
December 17, 1994	Mi Tierra †	Gloria Estefan	
December 24, 1994	Mi Tierra †	Gloria Estefan	
December 31, 1994	Mi Tierra †	Gloria Estefan	
January 7, 1995	Mi Tierra †	Gloria Estefan	
January 14, 1995	Mi Tierra †	Gloria Estefan	
January 21, 1995	Mi Tierra †	Gloria Estefan	
January 28, 1995	Mi Tierra †	Gloria Estefan	
February 4, 1995	Mi Tierra †	Gloria Estefan	
February 11, 1995	Mi Tierra †	Gloria Estefan	
February 18, 1995	Mi Tierra †	Gloria Estefan	
February 25, 1995	Mi Tierra †	Gloria Estefan	
March 4, 1995	Mi Tierra †	Gloria Estefan	
March 11, 1995	Mi Tierra †	Gloria Estefan	
March 18, 1995	Mi Tierra †	Gloria Estefan	
March 25, 1995	Mi Tierra †	Gloria Estefan	
April 1, 1995	Dicen Que Soy	La India	
April 8, 1995	Mi Tierra †	Gloria Estefan	
April 15, 1995	Mi Tierra †	Gloria Estefan	
April 22, 1995	Dicen Que Soy	La India	
April 29, 1995	Mi Tierra †	Gloria Estefan	
May 6, 1995	Merengue en la Calle 8 '95	Various artists	
May 13, 1995	Merengue en la Calle 8 '95	Various artists	
May 20, 1995	Merengue en la Calle 8 '95	Various artists	
May 27, 1995	Merengue en la Calle 8 '95	Various artists	
June 3, 1995	Merengue en la Calle 8 '95	Various artists	
June 10, 1995	Merengue en la Calle 8 '95	Various artists	
June 17, 1995	Todo a Su Tiempo	Marc Anthony	
June 24, 1995	Todo a Su Tiempo	Marc Anthony	
July 1, 1995	Todo a Su Tiempo	Marc Anthony	
July 8, 1995	Todo a Su Tiempo	Marc Anthony	
July 15, 1995	Todo a Su Tiempo	Marc Anthony	
July 22, 1995	Magia	Jerry Rivera	
July 29, 1995	Magia	Jerry Rivera	
August 5, 1995	Magia	Jerry Rivera	
August 12, 1995	Todo a Su Tiempo	Marc Anthony	
August 19, 1995	Magia	Jerry Rivera	
August 26, 1995	La Tierra del Olvido	Carlos Vives	
September 2, 1995	La Tierra del Olvido	Carlos Vives	
September 9, 1995	La Tierra del Olvido	Carlos Vives	
September 16, 1995	La Tierra del Olvido	Carlos Vives	
September 23, 1995	La Tierra del Olvido	Carlos Vives	
September 30, 1995	La Tierra del Olvido	Carlos Vives	
October 7, 1995	La Tierra del Olvido	Carlos Vives	
October 14, 1995	Abriendo Puertas†	Gloria Estefan	
October 21, 1995	Abriendo Puertas†	Gloria Estefan	
October 28, 1995	Abriendo Puertas†	Gloria Estefan	
November 4, 1995	Abriendo Puertas†	Gloria Estefan	
November 11, 1995	Abriendo Puertas†	Gloria Estefan	
November 18, 1995	Abriendo Puertas†	Gloria Estefan	
November 25, 1995	Abriendo Puertas†	Gloria Estefan	
December 2, 1995	Abriendo Puertas†	Gloria Estefan	
December 9, 1995	Abriendo Puertas†	Gloria Estefan	
December 16, 1995	Abriendo Puertas†	Gloria Estefan	
December 23, 1995	Abriendo Puertas†	Gloria Estefan	
December 30, 1995	Abriendo Puertas†	Gloria Estefan	
January 6, 1996	Abriendo Puertas†	Gloria Estefan	
January 13, 1996	Abriendo Puertas†	Gloria Estefan	
January 20, 1996	Abriendo Puertas†	Gloria Estefan	
January 27, 1996	Abriendo Puertas†	Gloria Estefan	
February 3, 1996	Abriendo Puertas†	Gloria Estefan	
February 10, 1996	Abriendo Puertas†	Gloria Estefan	
February 17, 1996	Abriendo Puertas†	Gloria Estefan	
February 24, 1996	Abriendo Puertas†	Gloria Estefan	
March 2, 1996	Abriendo Puertas†	Gloria Estefan	
March 9, 1996	Abriendo Puertas†	Gloria Estefan	
March 16, 1996	Abriendo Puertas†	Gloria Estefan	
March 23, 1996	Abriendo Puertas†	Gloria Estefan	
March 30, 1996	Abriendo Puertas†	Gloria Estefan	
April 6, 1996	Abriendo Puertas†	Gloria Estefan	
April 13, 1996	Abriendo Puertas†	Gloria Estefan	
April 20, 1996	Abriendo Puertas†	Gloria Estefan	
April 27, 1996	Abriendo Puertas†	Gloria Estefan	
May 4, 1996	Abriendo Puertas†	Gloria Estefan	
May 11, 1996	Abriendo Puertas†	Gloria Estefan	
May 18, 1996	Abriendo Puertas†	Gloria Estefan	
May 25, 1996	Abriendo Puertas†	Gloria Estefan	
June 1, 1996	Abriendo Puertas†	Gloria Estefan	
June 8, 1996	Abriendo Puertas†	Gloria Estefan	
June 15, 1996	Abriendo Puertas†	Gloria Estefan	
June 22, 1996	Abriendo Puertas†	Gloria Estefan	
June 29, 1996	Abriendo Puertas†	Gloria Estefan	
July 6, 1996	Abriendo Puertas†	Gloria Estefan	
July 13, 1996	Abriendo Puertas†	Gloria Estefan	
July 20, 1996	Abriendo Puertas†	Gloria Estefan	
July 27, 1996	Abriendo Puertas†	Gloria Estefan	
August 3, 1996	Abriendo Puertas†	Gloria Estefan	
August 10, 1996	Abriendo Puertas†	Gloria Estefan	
August 17, 1996	Mi Tierra	Gloria Estefan	
August 24, 1996	Abriendo Puertas†	Gloria Estefan	
August 31, 1996	Abriendo Puertas†	Gloria Estefan	
September 7, 1996	Abriendo Puertas†	Gloria Estefan	
September 14, 1996	Todo a Su Tiempo	Marc Anthony	
September 21, 1996	Todo a Su Tiempo	Marc Anthony	
September 28, 1996	Todo a Su Tiempo	Marc Anthony	
October 5, 1996	Todo a Su Tiempo	Marc Anthony	
October 12, 1996	Mi Tierra	Gloria Estefan	
October 19, 1996	Todo a Su Tiempo	Marc Anthony	
October 26, 1996	Todo a Su Tiempo	Marc Anthony	
November 2, 1996	Todo a Su Tiempo	Marc Anthony	
November 9, 1996	Auténtico	Manny Manuel	
November 16, 1996	Auténtico	Manny Manuel	
November 23, 1996	Auténtico	Manny Manuel	
November 30, 1996	Auténtico	Manny Manuel	
December 7, 1996	Esencia	Gilberto Santa Rosa	
December 14, 1996	Esencia	Gilberto Santa Rosa	
December 21, 1996	Esencia	Gilberto Santa Rosa	
December 28, 1996	Está de Moda	Grupo Manía	
January 4, 1997	Está de Moda	Grupo Manía	
January 11, 1997	Está de Moda	Grupo Manía	
January 18, 1997	Está de Moda	Grupo Manía	
January 25, 1997	Abriendo Puertas	Gloria Estefan	
February 1, 1997	Abriendo Puertas	Gloria Estefan	
February 8, 1997	Abriendo Puertas	Gloria Estefan	
February 15, 1997	Abriendo Puertas	Gloria Estefan	
February 22, 1997	Abriendo Puertas	Gloria Estefan	
March 1, 1997	Esencia	Gilberto Santa Rosa	
March 8, 1997	Merengón	Various artists	
March 15, 1997	Merengón	Various artists	
March 22, 1997	Merengón	Various artists	
March 29, 1997	Merengón	Various artists	
April 5, 1997	Merengón	Various artists	
April 12, 1997	Todo a Su Tiempo	Marc Anthony	
April 19, 1997	Todo a Su Tiempo	Marc Anthony	
April 26, 1997	Todo a Su Tiempo	Marc Anthony	
May 3, 1997	Todo a Su Tiempo	Marc Anthony	
May 10, 1997	Y Es Fácil!	Los Hermanos Rosario	
May 17, 1997	Llévame Contigo	Olga Tañón	
May 24, 1997	Llévame Contigo	Olga Tañón	
May 31, 1997	Llévame Contigo	Olga Tañón	
June 7, 1997	Llévame Contigo	Olga Tañón	
June 14, 1997	Llévame Contigo	Olga Tañón	
June 21, 1997	Llévame Contigo	Olga Tañón	
June 28, 1997	Llévame Contigo	Olga Tañón	
July 5, 1997	Llévame Contigo	Olga Tañón	
July 12, 1997	Llévame Contigo	Olga Tañón	
July 19, 1997	Llévame Contigo	Olga Tañón	
July 26, 1997	Sentimientos †	Charlie Zaa	
August 2, 1997	Sentimientos †	Charlie Zaa	
August 9, 1997	Sentimientos †	Charlie Zaa	
August 16, 1997	Sentimientos †	Charlie Zaa	
August 23, 1997	Sentimientos †	Charlie Zaa	
August 30, 1997	Sentimientos †	Charlie Zaa	
September 6, 1997	Sentimientos †	Charlie Zaa	
September 13, 1997	Sentimientos †	Charlie Zaa	
September 20, 1997	Sentimientos †	Charlie Zaa	
September 27, 1997	Sentimientos †	Charlie Zaa	
October 4, 1997	Sentimientos †	Charlie Zaa	
October 11, 1997	Sentimientos †	Charlie Zaa	
October 18, 1997	Sentimientos †	Charlie Zaa	
October 25, 1997	Sentimientos †	Charlie Zaa	
November 1, 1997	Sentimientos †	Charlie Zaa	
November 8, 1997	Sobre el Fuego	La India	
November 15, 1997	Sobre el Fuego	La India	
November 22, 1997	Contra la Corriente	Marc Anthony	
November 29, 1997	Contra la Corriente	Marc Anthony	
December 6, 1997	Contra la Corriente	Marc Anthony	
December 13, 1997	Contra la Corriente	Marc Anthony	
December 20, 1997	Contra la Corriente	Marc Anthony	
December 27, 1997	Contra la Corriente	Marc Anthony	
January 3, 1998	Contra la Corriente	Marc Anthony	
January 10, 1998	Contra la Corriente	Marc Anthony	
January 17, 1998	Contra la Corriente	Marc Anthony	
January 24, 1998	Contra la Corriente	Marc Anthony	
January 31, 1998	Contra la Corriente	Marc Anthony	
February 7, 1998	Contra la Corriente	Marc Anthony	
February 14, 1998	Contra la Corriente	Marc Anthony	
February 21, 1998	Buena Vista Social Club †	Buena Vista Social Club	
February 28, 1998	Contra la Corriente	Marc Anthony	
March 7, 1998	Buena Vista Social Club †	Buena Vista Social Club	
March 14, 1998	Buena Vista Social Club †	Buena Vista Social Club	
March 21, 1998	Buena Vista Social Club †	Buena Vista Social Club	
March 28, 1998	Buena Vista Social Club †	Buena Vista Social Club	
April 4, 1998	Buena Vista Social Club †	Buena Vista Social Club	
April 11, 1998	Buena Vista Social Club †	Buena Vista Social Club	
April 18, 1998	Buena Vista Social Club †	Buena Vista Social Club	
April 25, 1998	Buena Vista Social Club †	Buena Vista Social Club	
May 2, 1998	Buena Vista Social Club †	Buena Vista Social Club	
May 9, 1998	Buena Vista Social Club †	Buena Vista Social Club	
May 16, 1998	Suavemente	Elvis Crespo	
May 23, 1998	Suavemente	Elvis Crespo	
May 30, 1998	Ironías	Víctor Manuelle	
June 6, 1998	Ironías	Víctor Manuelle	
June 13, 1998	Suavemente	Elvis Crespo	
June 20, 1998	Suavemente	Elvis Crespo	
June 27, 1998	Suavemente	Elvis Crespo	
July 4, 1998	Suavemente	Elvis Crespo	
July 11, 1998	Suavemente	Elvis Crespo	
July 18, 1998	Suavemente	Elvis Crespo	
July 25, 1998	Suavemente	Elvis Crespo	
August 1, 1998	Suavemente	Elvis Crespo	
August 8, 1998	Suavemente	Elvis Crespo	
August 15, 1998	Suavemente	Elvis Crespo	
August 22, 1998	Un Segundo Sentimiento	Charlie Zaa	
August 29, 1998	Dance with Me: Music from the Motion Picture	Soundtrack	
September 5, 1998	Dance with Me: Music from the Motion Picture	Soundtrack	
September 12, 1998	Dance with Me: Music from the Motion Picture	Soundtrack	
September 19, 1998	Dance with Me: Music from the Motion Picture	Soundtrack	
September 26, 1998	Dance with Me: Music from the Motion Picture	Soundtrack	
October 3, 1998	Dance with Me: Music from the Motion Picture	Soundtrack	
October 10, 1998	Dance with Me: Music from the Motion Picture	Soundtrack	
October 17, 1998	Dance with Me: Music from the Motion Picture	Soundtrack	
October 24, 1998	Dance with Me: Music from the Motion Picture	Soundtrack	
October 31, 1998	Dance with Me: Music from the Motion Picture	Soundtrack	
November 7, 1998	Dance with Me: Music from the Motion Picture	Soundtrack	
November 14, 1998	Dance with Me: Music from the Motion Picture	Soundtrack	
November 21, 1998	Suavemente †	Elvis Crespo	
November 28, 1998	Suavemente †	Elvis Crespo	
December 5, 1998	Suavemente †	Elvis Crespo	
December 12, 1998	Suavemente †	Elvis Crespo	
December 19, 1998	Suavemente †	Elvis Crespo	
December 26, 1998	Suavemente †	Elvis Crespo	
January 2, 1999	Suavemente †	Elvis Crespo	
January 9, 1999	Suavemente †	Elvis Crespo	
January 16, 1999	Suavemente †	Elvis Crespo	
January 23, 1999	Suavemente †	Elvis Crespo	
January 30, 1999	Suavemente †	Elvis Crespo	
February 6, 1999	Suavemente †	Elvis Crespo	
February 13, 1999	Suavemente †	Elvis Crespo	
February 20, 1999	Suavemente †	Elvis Crespo	
February 27, 1999	Suavemente †	Elvis Crespo	
March 6, 1999	Suavemente †	Elvis Crespo	
March 13, 1999	Suavemente †	Elvis Crespo	
March 20, 1999	Suavemente †	Elvis Crespo	
March 27, 1999	Suavemente †	Elvis Crespo	
April 3, 1999	Suavemente †	Elvis Crespo	
April 10, 1999	Suavemente †	Elvis Crespo	
April 17, 1999	Suavemente †	Elvis Crespo	
April 24, 1999	Suavemente †	Elvis Crespo	
May 1, 1999	Suavemente †	Elvis Crespo	
May 8, 1999	Suavemente †	Elvis Crespo	
May 15, 1999	Suavemente †	Elvis Crespo	
May 22, 1999	Píntame	Elvis Crespo	
May 29, 1999	Píntame	Elvis Crespo	
June 5, 1999	Píntame	Elvis Crespo	
June 12, 1999	Píntame	Elvis Crespo	
June 19, 1999	Píntame	Elvis Crespo	
June 26, 1999	Suavemente †	Elvis Crespo	
July 3, 1999	Píntame	Elvis Crespo	
July 10, 1999	Buena Vista Social Club Presents Ibrahim Ferrer	Ibrahim Ferrer	
July 17, 1999	Buena Vista Social Club Presents Ibrahim Ferrer	Ibrahim Ferrer	
July 24, 1999	Buena Vista Social Club Presents Ibrahim Ferrer	Ibrahim Ferrer	
July 31, 1999	Buena Vista Social Club Presents Ibrahim Ferrer	Ibrahim Ferrer	
August 7, 1999	Buena Vista Social Club Presents Ibrahim Ferrer	Ibrahim Ferrer	
August 14, 1999	Buena Vista Social Club Presents Ibrahim Ferrer	Ibrahim Ferrer	
August 21, 1999	Buena Vista Social Club Presents Ibrahim Ferrer	Ibrahim Ferrer	
August 28, 1999	Buena Vista Social Club Presents Ibrahim Ferrer	Ibrahim Ferrer	
September 4, 1999	Buena Vista Social Club Presents Ibrahim Ferrer	Ibrahim Ferrer	
September 11, 1999	Buena Vista Social Club Presents Ibrahim Ferrer	Ibrahim Ferrer	
September 18, 1999	Buena Vista Social Club Presents Ibrahim Ferrer	Ibrahim Ferrer	
September 25, 1999	Buena Vista Social Club Presents Ibrahim Ferrer	Ibrahim Ferrer	
October 2, 1999	Buena Vista Social Club Presents Ibrahim Ferrer	Ibrahim Ferrer	
October 9, 1999	Buena Vista Social Club	Buena Vista Social Club	
October 16, 1999	Inconfundible	Víctor Manuelle	
October 23, 1999	Inconfundible	Víctor Manuelle	
October 30, 1999	Inconfundible	Víctor Manuelle	
November 6, 1999	Inconfundible	Víctor Manuelle	
November 13, 1999	Inconfundible	Víctor Manuelle	
November 20, 1999	Buena Vista Social Club Presents Ibrahim Ferrer	Ibrahim Ferrer	
November 27, 1999	Desde un Principio: From the Beginning	Marc Anthony	
December 4, 1999	Desde un Principio: From the Beginning	Marc Anthony	
December 11, 1999	Desde un Principio: From the Beginning	Marc Anthony	
December 18, 1999	Desde un Principio: From the Beginning	Marc Anthony	
December 25, 1999	Desde un Principio: From the Beginning	Marc Anthony	
