= Premio Lo Nuestro 1991 =

Latin Music awards show

3rd Lo Nuestro Awards
- Date: Thursday, May 23, 1991
- Site: James L. Knight Center; Miami, Florida, USA
- Hosted by: Antonio Vodanovich

Highlights
- Most awards: Ana Gabriel and Juan Luis Guerra y 440 (3)
- Most nominations: Juan Luis Guerra (5)

The 3rd Lo Nuestro Awards ceremony, presented by Univision honoring the best Latin music of 1990 and 1991 took place on May 23, 1991, at a live presentation held at the James L. Knight Center in Miami, Florida. The ceremony was broadcast in the United States and Latin America by Univision.

During the ceremony, seventeen categories were presented. Winners were announced at the live event and included Mexican singer-songwriter Ana Gabriel and Dominican group Juan Luis Guerra y 440, receiving three competitive awards each. Mexican band Bronco earned two accolades. The live show included performances by Daniela Romo, Myriam Hernández, Raúl di Blasio, Rudy La Scala, Franco de Vita, Luis Enrique, Banda Blanca, Los Tigres del Norte, Orquesta de la Luz, Azúcar Moreno, Yuri, and Mariachi Cobre.

== Background ==
In 1989, the Lo Nuestro Awards were established by Univision, to recognize the most talented performers of Latin music. The nominees and winners were selected by a voting poll conducted among program directors of Spanish-language radio stations in the United States and also based on chart performance on Billboard Latin music charts, with the results being tabulated and certified by the accounting firm Deloitte. The trophy awarded is shaped like a treble clef. The categories were for the Pop, Tropical/Salsa, Regional Mexican genres and Music Video fields. The 3rd Lo Nuestro Awards ceremony was held on May 23, 1991, in a live presentation held at the James L. Knight Center in Miami, Florida. The ceremony was broadcast in the United States and Latin America by Univision and included live performances by Daniela Romo, Ana Gabriel, Myriam Hernández, Raúl di Blasio, Rudy La Scala, Franco de Vita, Luis Enrique, Banda Blanca, Los Tigres del Norte, Orquesta de la Luz, Azúcar Moreno, Yuri, and Mariachi Cobre.

== Winners and nominees ==
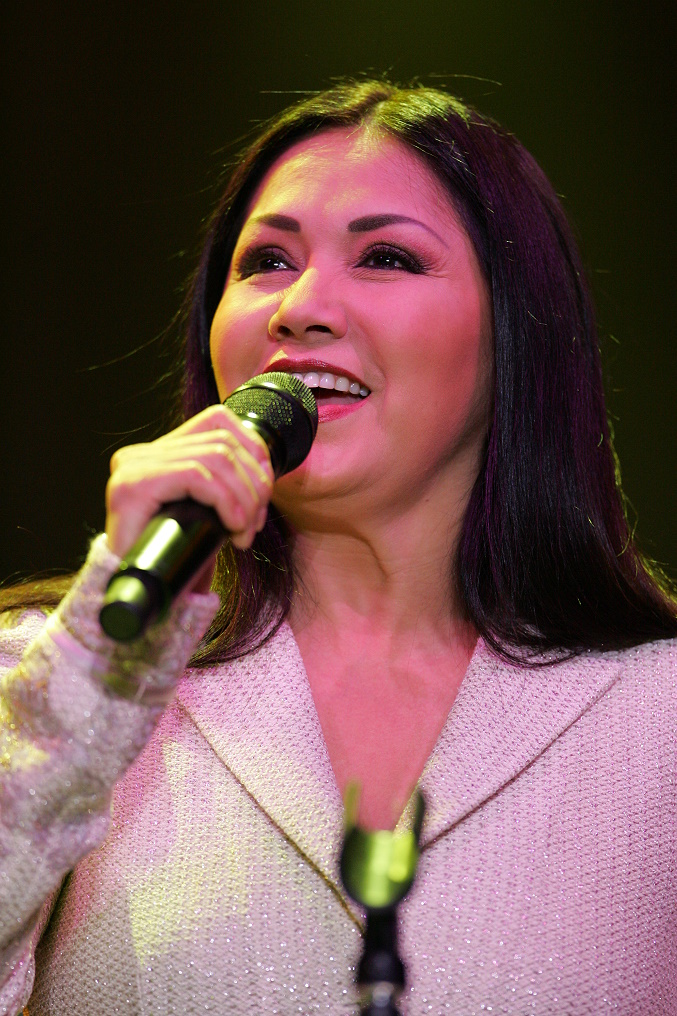
Mexican singer Ana Gabriel (pictured in 2006) won the Lo Nuestro Award for Pop Female Artist of the Year.

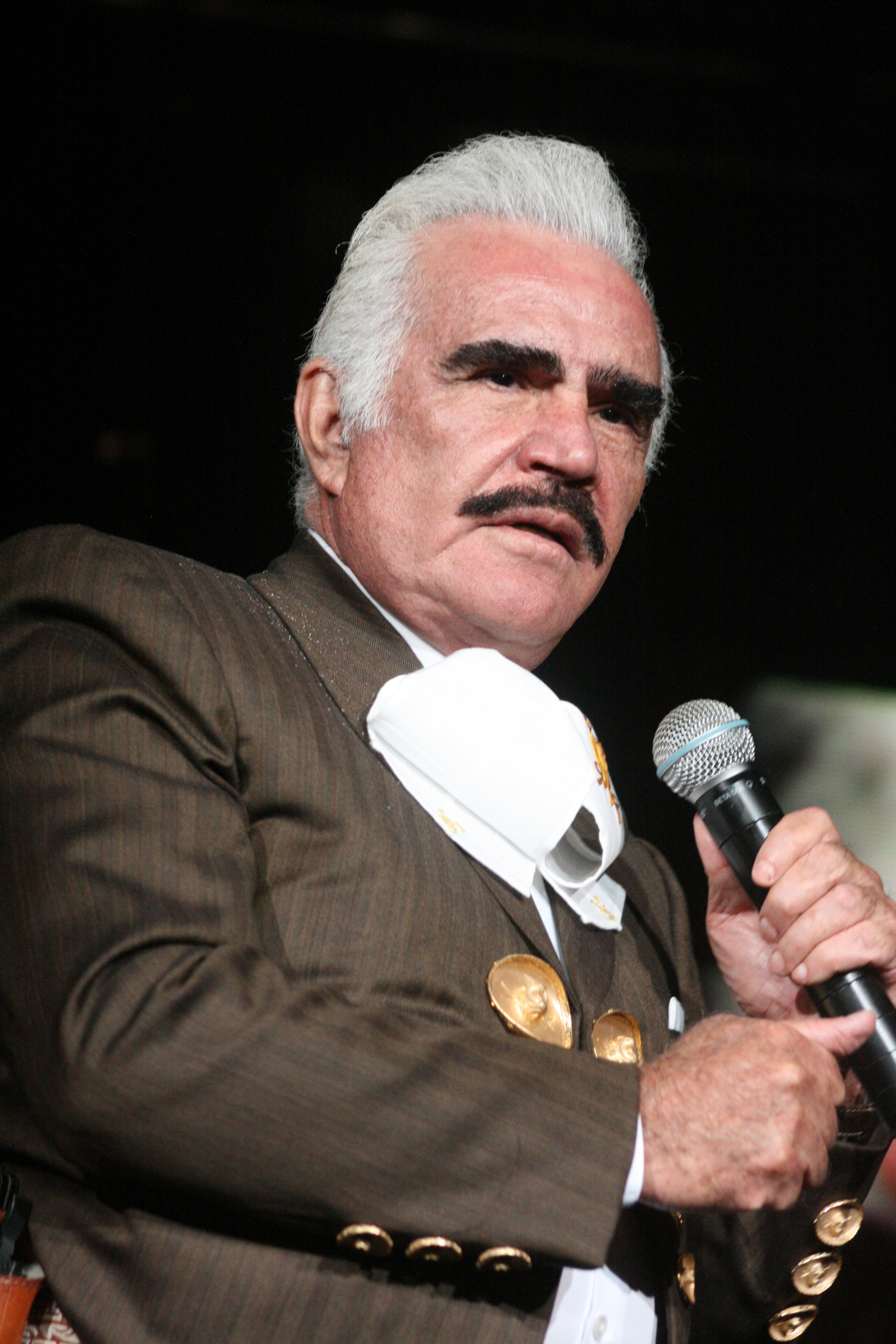
Singer Vicente Fernández (pictured in 2011) received the Male Regional Mexican Artist of the Year Award.

Winners were announced before the live audience during the ceremony. Mexican singer-songwriter Ana Gabriel was the most nominated performer and won three of her nominations, including Pop Song of the Year for "Es Demasiado Tarde" (Gabriel was a double nominee in the category). The track was named the best-performing Latin single of 1991 in the United States. Dominican band Juan Luis Guerra y 440 were triple nominees for Tropical Salsa Song of the Year winning for "Burbujas de Amor", Group of the Year and Music Video. Mexican band Bronco dominated the Regional/Mexican field winning Album and Song of the Year with "Corazón Duro". Mexican singer-songwriter Juan Gabriel and Spanish opera singer Plácido Domingo received Lifetime Achievement Awards.

Winners and nominees of the 3rd Annual Lo Nuestro Awards (winners listed first).
Pop Album of the Year	Pop Song of the Year
Ana Gabriel – Quién Como Tú; Myriam Hernández – Dos; Rudy La Scala – Cuando Yo Amo; Luis Miguel – 20 Años; Daniela Romo – Quiero Amanecer con Alguien	Ana Gabriel – "Es Demasiado Tarde"; Chayanne – "Completamente Enamorados"; Ana Gabriel – "Quién Como Tú"; Rudy La Scala – "El Cariño Es Como Una Flor"; Luis Miguel – "Tengo Todo Excepto a Ti"
Male Artist of the Year, Pop	Female Artist of the Year, Pop
Luis Miguel; Rudy La Scala; Roberto Carlos; José Luis Rodríguez	Ana Gabriel; Gloria Estefan; Myriam Hernández; Daniela Romo
Pop Group of the Year	New Pop Artist of the Year
Los Bukis; Azúcar Moreno; Kaoma; Pandora	Azúcar Moreno; Raúl di Blasio; Garibaldi; Alejandra Guzmán
Regional Mexican Album of the Year	Regional Mexican Song of the Year
Bronco – A Todo Galope; Grupo Mazz – No Te Olvidaré; La Mafia – Enter the Future; Los Temerarios – De lo Nuevo, De lo Mejor; Los Tigres del Norte – Mi Buena Suerte	Bronco – "Corazón Duro"; Vicente Fernández and Alejandro Fernández – "Amor de los Dos"; Los Caminantes – "Sólo los Tontos"; Los Temerarios – "Sólo Te Quiero a Ti"; Angeles Ochoa – "Déjame en Paz"
Regional Mexican Artist of the Year	Regional Mexican Group of the Year
Vicente Fernández; Ramón Ayala; David Lee Garza; Juan Valentín	Los Temerarios; Bronco; Grupo Mazz; Los Tigres del Norte
Regional Mexican New Artist of the Year
Angeles Ochoa; Adalberto; Rocky Hernández; Texas Tornados
Tropical/Salsa Album of the Year	Tropical/Salsa Song of the Year
Luis Enrique & Eddie Santiago – Los Príncipes de la Salsa; Juan Manuel Lebrón – El Primero; Orquesta de la Luz – Salsa Caliente del Japón; Gilberto Santa Rosa – Punto de Vista; Nino Segarra – Con la Música por Dentro	Juan Luis Guerra y 440 – "Burbujas de Amor"; Banda Blanca – "Sopa de Caracol"; Juan Luis Guerra y 440 – "La Bilirrubina"; Juan Luis Guerra y 440 – "Estrellitas y Duendes"; Luis Enrique – "Mi Mundo"
Tropical Salsa Artist of the Year	Tropical Salsa Group of the Year
Luis Enrique; Juan Manuel Lebrón; Gilberto Santa Rosa; Nino Segarra	Juan Luis Guerra y 440; Orquesta de la Luz; La Patrulla 15; La Coco Band
Tropical Salsa New Artist of the Year	Video of the Year
Banda Blanca; Angel Javier; Orquesta de la Luz; Jerry Rivera	Juan Luis Guerra y 440 – "A Pedir su Mano"

== See also ==
- 1990 in Latin music
- 1991 in Latin music
- Grammy Award for Best Latin Pop Album
