= Auténtico (Manny Manuel album) =

Studio album by Manny Manuel
- Released: October 22, 1996
- Genre: Merengue
- Label: RMM
- Producer: Jaime Querol, Rafael Camilo

Manny Manuel chronology
El Rey de Corazones (1994)	Auténtico (1996)	Es Mi Tiempo (1998)

Auténtico (Authentic) is the second studio album by Puerto Rican merengue singer Manny Manuel. It became his first number-one album on the Tropical Albums chart. It was nominated Best Merengue Album at the 1997 Premios ACE. It was also nominated Tropical Album of the Year at the Premio Lo Nuestro 1997. It was promoted by its single, "Y Sé Que Vas a Llorar" (originally performed by Marisela) which peaked at number one on the Tropical Airplay chart.

== Track listing ==
No.	Title	Writer(s)	Length
1.	"Y Sé Que Vas a Llorar"	Carlos Maria	4:40
2.	"Mi Primer Beso"	Alicia Baroni	4:52
3.	"Y Lloras Por Mi"	Ramón Orlando	4:08
4.	"En Este Momento"	Mario Echevarria	4:21
5.	"Se Va, Se Va"	Joaquín Galán, Lucía Galán	4:27
6.	"Parece Mentira"	Omar Alfanno	4:47
7.	"Si No Fui Yo"	Art Hernandez	4:38
8.	"Un Amor en el Olvido"	Victor Franco	4:40
9.	"Loba Feroz"	Rafael Camilo	4:19
10.	"Yo"	Anthony Ríos	4:19
11.	"A Quien Vas a Engañar"	Camilo	4:39
12.	"Payaso"	Raphy Leavitt	5:03

== Charts ==
Chart (1996)	Peak position
US Top Latin Albums (Billboard)	8
US Tropical Albums (Billboard)	1

== See also ==
- List of number-one Billboard Tropical Albums from the 1990s
