= El Rey de los Soneros =

Studio album by Oscar D'León
- Released: 14 July 1992
- Genre: Salsa
- Length: 37:08
- Label: RMM
- Producer: Victor Mendoza

Oscar D'León chronology
Auténtico (1991)	El Rey de los Soneros (1992)	En Vivo (1992)

El Rey de los Soneros (The King of Soneros) is a studio album by Venezuelan salsa singer Oscar D'León. It reached the top of the Tropical Albums chart. It was nominated Tropical Album of the Year at the 5th Lo Nuestro Awards in 1993. It was promoted by its single "La Carta" which peaked at number 19 on the Hot Latin Songs chart. "Padro E Hijo" was also a hit and features his son Jerman D' León.

== Track listing ==
No.	Title	Writer(s)	Length
1.	"Que Lástima"	Oscar D'León	3:55
2.	"Me Voy Pa' Cali"	Gabriel Romero	3:50
3.	"Padre E Hijo"	Orlando DeLaGuardia	5:30
4.	"Mi Deuda De Amor"		3:49
5.	"La Carta"		4:48
6.	"Soledad"	Oscar D'León	5:42
7.	"Mi Error"	Oscar D'León	4:44
8.	"Cristobal C."	Victor Mendoza	4:50

== Charts ==
Chart (1992)	Peak position
U.S. Billboard Tropical Albums	1

== See also ==
- List of number-one Billboard Tropical Albums from the 1990s
