= Los Príncipes de la Salsa =

Compilation album by Luis Enrique and Eddie Santiago
- Released: June 17, 1990
- Genre: Salsa
- Length: 44:56
- Label: Sony Discos

Professional ratings
Review scores
Source	Rating
Allmusic	3/5 stars

Los Príncipes de la Salsa (English: The Princes of Salsa) is a compilation album by salsa singers Luis Enrique and Eddie Santiago. The album was released by CBS Discos in 1990. José A. Estévez, Jr. rated the album three-out-of-five stars finding it to be "strictly commercial". The album was given a Premio Lo Nuestro award for "Tropical Album of the Year" in 1990. It features a new track "Amiga" by Luis Enrique which was nominated a Grammy Award for Best Tropical Latin Performance in 1991.

== Track listing ==
No.	Title	Length
1.	"Amiga" (performed by Luis Enrique)	4:36
2.	"Desesperado" (performed by Luis Enrique)	3:54
3.	"Tu No le Ames, le Temes" (performed by Luis Enrique)	4:30
4.	"Lo Que Paso Entre Tu y Yo... Paso" (performed by Luis Enrique)	4:42
5.	"No Te Quites la Ropa" (performed by Luis Enrique)	4:05
6.	"Tu Me Quemas" (performed by Eddie Santiago)	5:02
7.	"Que Locura Enamorarme de Ti" (performed by Eddie Santiago)	5:11
8.	"Lluvia" (performed by Eddie Santiago)	4:57
9.	"Insaciable" (performed by Eddie Santiago)	4:30
10.	"Tu Me Haces Falta" (performed by Eddie Santiago)	4:40

== Charts ==
Chart (1990)	Peak position
US Tropical Albums (Billboard)	1

== See also ==
- List of Billboard Tropical Albums number ones from the 1990s
