= Lo Nuestro Award for Tropical Male Artist of the Year =

Latin music award

Lo Nuestro Award for Tropical Salsa Male Artist of the Year
- Awarded for: Tropical Salsa Male Artist of the Year
- Country: United States
- Presented by: Univision
- First award: 1993
- Currently held by: Prince Royce (2014)
- Website: univision.com/premiolonuestro

The Lo Nuestro Award for Tropical Salsa Male Artist of the Year (or Lo Nuestro Award for Tropical Male Artist of the Year) is an honor presented annually by American network Univision. The Lo Nuestro Awards were first awarded in 1989 and has been given annually since to recognize the most talented performers of Latin music. The nominees and winners were originally selected by a voting poll conducted among program directors of Spanish-language radio stations in the United States and also based on chart performance on Billboard Latin music charts, with the results being tabulated and certified by the accounting firm Deloitte. At the present time, the winners are selected by the audience through an online survey. The trophy awarded is shaped in the form of a treble clef. This category originally was awarded as Tropical Salsa Artist of the Year (1989-1992), and from 1993 onwards was separated as Female Artist of the Year and Male Artist of the Year.

The award was first presented to Puerto-Rican American singer Jerry Rivera in 1993. American performer Marc Anthony holds the record for the most awards with eight, out of fourteen nominations. Anthony has also received the Lo Nuestro Award for Pop Male Artist of the Year (2001). Puerto-Rican singer singers Rivera, Prince Royce, and Elvis Crespo, awarded three, four, and two times, respectively, are the only multiple winners beside Anthony. Performers Fonseca, Frankie Negrón, Romeo Santos and Tito El Bambino are the most nominated performers without a win, with three unsuccessful nominations each.

== Winners and nominees ==
Listed below are the winners of the award for each year, as well as the other nominees for the majority of the years awarded.

Key	Meaning
‡	Indicates the winner

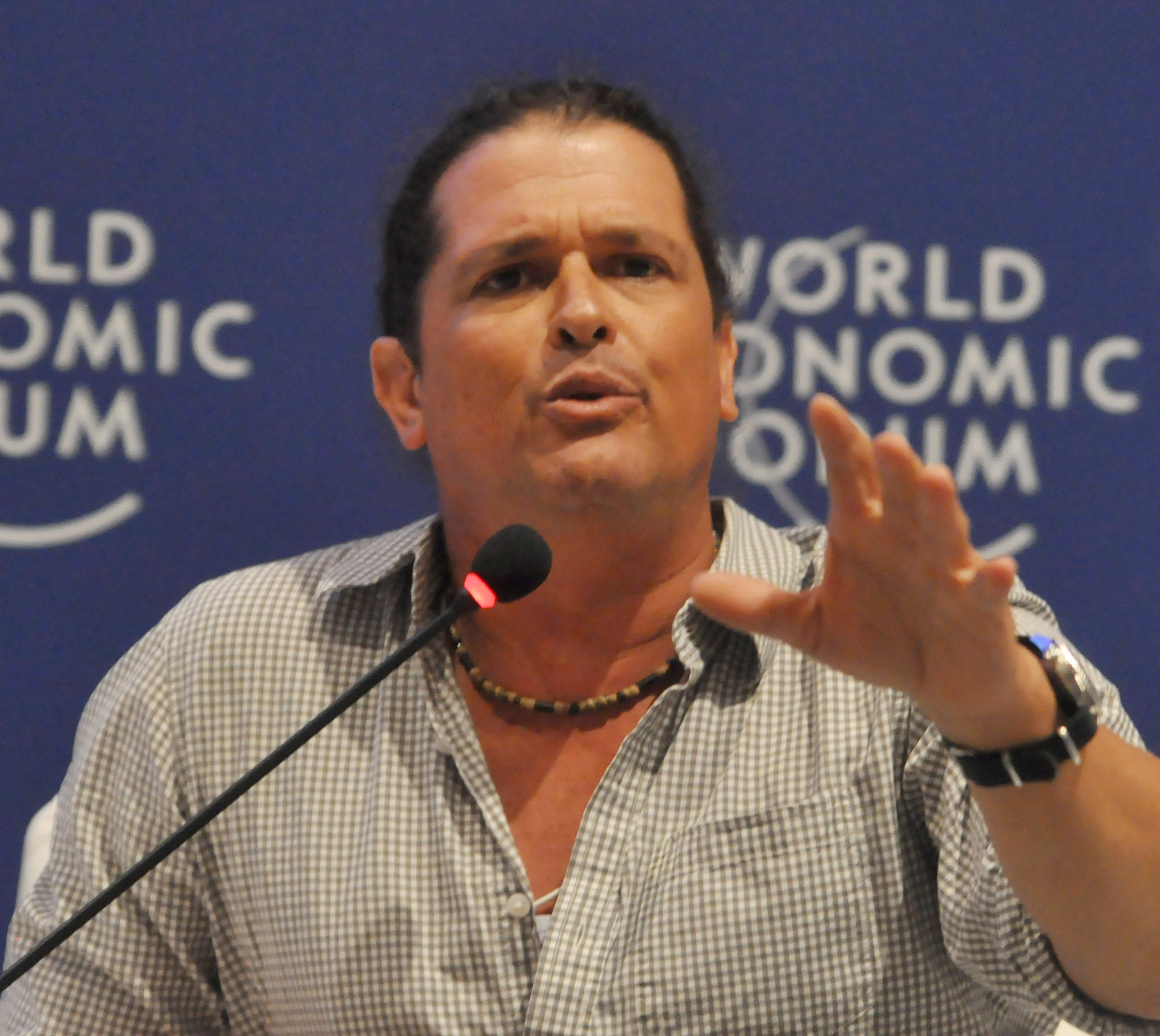
Colombian performer Carlos Vives (pictured in 2010), five-time nominee and winner in 1995

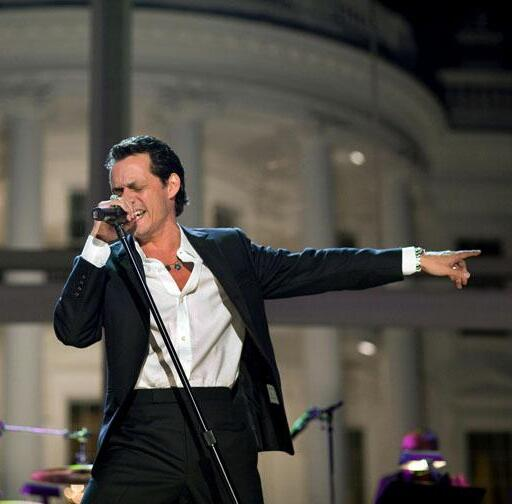
American singer Marc Anthony (pictured in 2009), the most awarded performer, winning eight times

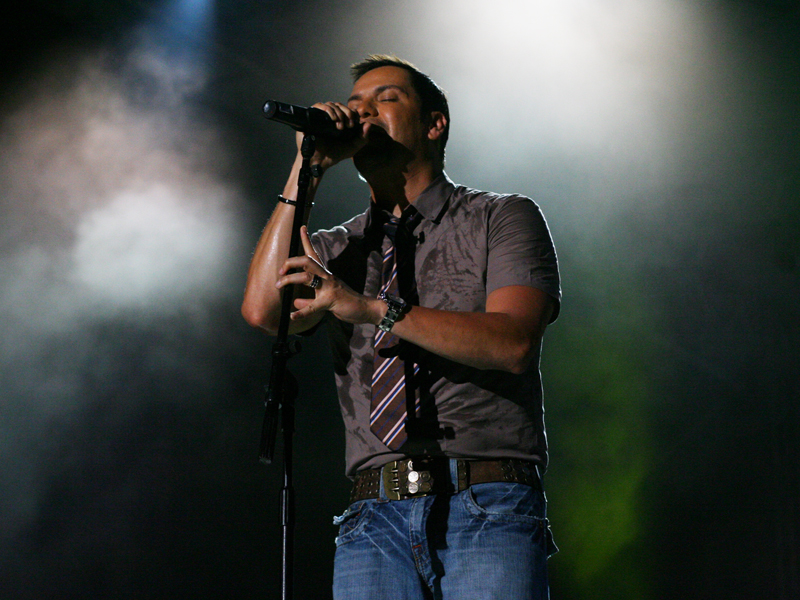
American singer Víctor Manuelle (pictured in 2007), seven-time nominee and winner in 2009

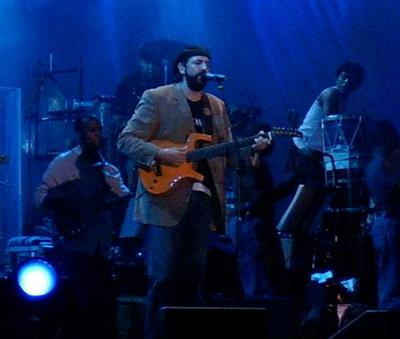
Dominican singer Juan Luis Guerra (pictured in 2005), winner in 2008

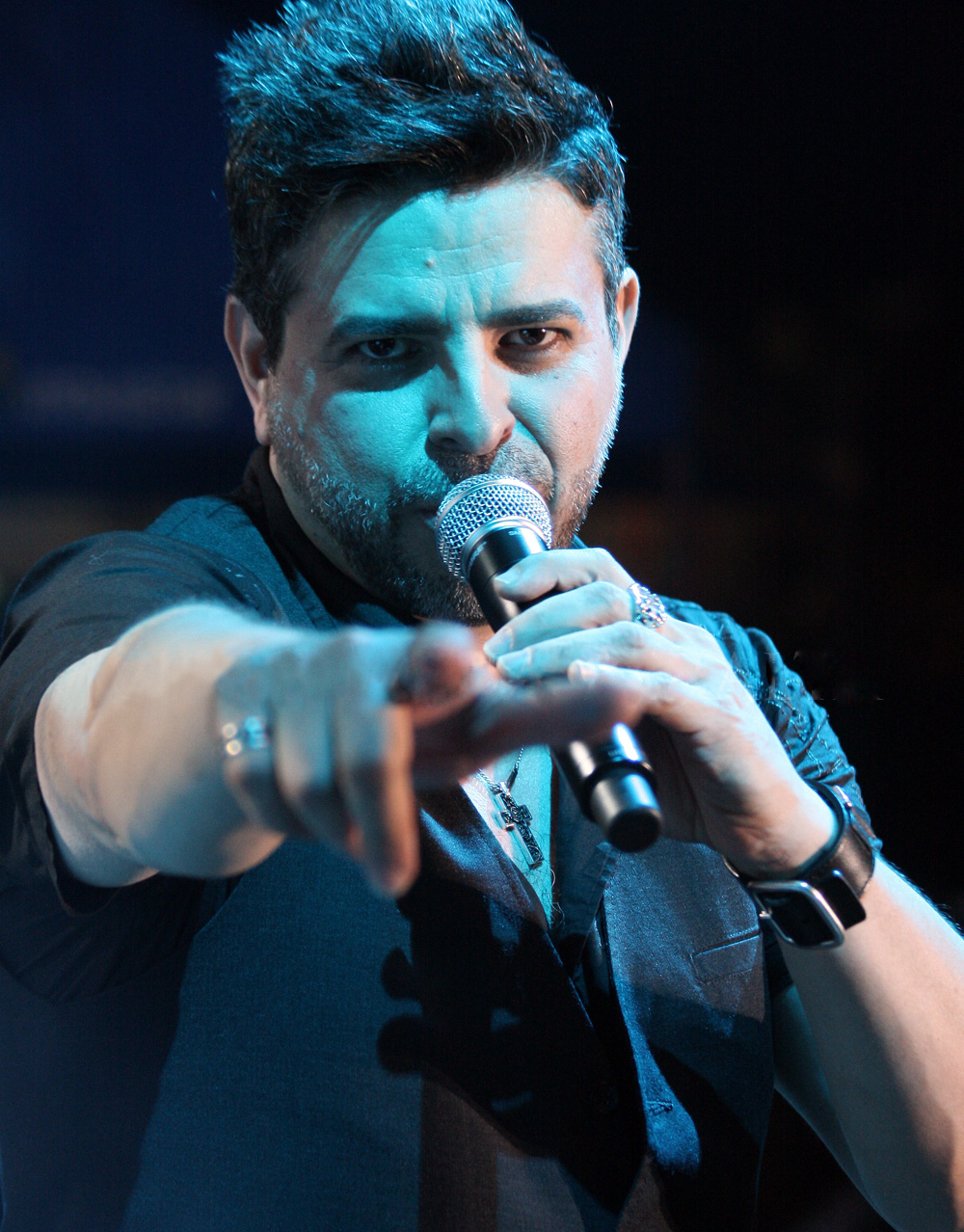
Nicaraguan performer Luis Enrique (pictured in 2010), two-time nominee and 2010 winner

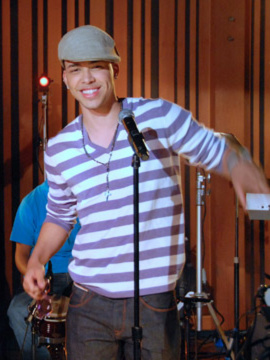
American singer Prince Royce (pictured in 2012), winner in 2011, 2012 and 2013, and nominee in 2014

Year	Performer	Ref
1993 (5th)	Jerry Rivera‡	
1993 (5th)	Tito Rojas	
1993 (5th)	Frankie Ruiz	
1993 (5th)	Gilberto Santa Rosa	
1994 (6th)	Jerry Rivera‡	
1994 (6th)	Marc Anthony	
1994 (6th)	Rey Ruiz	
1994 (6th)	Gilberto Santa Rosa	
1995 (7th)	Carlos Vives‡	
1995 (7th)	Rey Ruiz	
1995 (7th)	Jerry Rivera	
1995 (7th)	Gilberto Santa Rosa	
1996 (8th)	Marc Anthony‡	
1996 (8th)	Giro	
1996 (8th)	Jerry Rivera	
1996 (8th)	Gilberto Santa Rosa	
1997 (9th)	Marc Anthony‡	
1997 (9th)	Kinito Méndez	
1997 (9th)	Jerry Rivera	
1997 (9th)	Gilberto Santa Rosa	
1997 (9th)	Sergio Vargas	
1998 (10th)	Charlie Zaa‡	
1998 (10th)	Marc Anthony	
1998 (10th)	Frankie Negrón	
1998 (10th)	Víctor Manuelle	
1998 (10th)	Gilberto Santa Rosa	
1999 (11th)	Elvis Crespo‡	
1999 (11th)	Marc Anthony	
1999 (11th)	Frankie Negrón	
1999 (11th)	Charlie Zaa	
2000 (12th)	Elvis Crespo‡	
2000 (12th)	Marc Anthony	
2000 (12th)	Víctor Manuelle	
2000 (12th)	Gilberto Santa Rosa	
2001 (13th)	Marc Anthony‡	
2001 (13th)	Elvis Crespo	
2001 (13th)	Gilberto Santa Rosa	
2001 (13th)	Carlos Vives	
2002 (14th)	Gilberto Santa Rosa‡	
2002 (14th)	Frankie Negrón	
2002 (14th)	Jerry Rivera	
2002 (14th)	Eddie Santiago	
2003 (15th)	Marc Anthony‡	
2003 (15th)	Elvis Crespo	
2003 (15th)	Gilberto Santa Rosa	
2003 (15th)	Carlos Vives	
2004 (16th)	Marc Anthony‡	
2004 (16th)	Víctor Manuelle	
2004 (16th)	Jerry Rivera	
2004 (16th)	Gilberto Santa Rosa	
2005 (17th)	Marc Anthony‡	
2005 (17th)	Jerry Rivera	
2005 (17th)	Rey Ruiz	
2005 (17th)	Víctor Manuelle	
2006 (18th)	Marc Anthony‡	
2006 (18th)	Juan Luis Guerra	
2006 (18th)	Gilberto Santa Rosa	
2006 (18th)	Carlos Vives	
2007 (19th)	Marc Anthony‡	
2007 (19th)	Andy Andy	
2007 (19th)	Fonseca	
2007 (19th)	Tito Nieves	
2008 (20th)	Juan Luis Guerra‡	
2008 (20th)	Marc Anthony	
2008 (20th)	Fonseca	
2008 (20th)	Tito Nieves	
2009 (21st)	Víctor Manuelle‡	
2009 (21st)	Marc Anthony	
2009 (21st)	Juan Luis Guerra	
2009 (21st)	Frank Reyes	
2009 (21st)	Gilberto Santa Rosa	
2010 (22nd)	Luis Enrique‡	
2010 (22nd)	Héctor Acosta	
2010 (22nd)	Fonseca	
2010 (22nd)	Domenic Marte	
2010 (22nd)	Gilberto Santa Rosa	
2011 (23rd)	Prince Royce‡	
2011 (23rd)	Héctor Acosta "El Torito"	
2011 (23rd)	Juan Luis Guerra	
2011 (23rd)	Luis Enrique	
2011 (23rd)	Tito El Bambino	
2012 (24th)	Prince Royce‡	
2012 (24th)	Juan Luis Guerra	
2012 (24th)	Romeo Santos	
2012 (24th)	Tito El Bambino	
2013 (25th)	Prince Royce‡	
2013 (25th)	Romeo Santos	
2013 (25th)	Tito El Bambino	
2013 (25th)	Víctor Manuelle	
2014 (26th)	Prince Royce	
2014 (26th)	Elvis Crespo	
2014 (26th)	Romeo Santos	
2014 (26th)	Víctor Manuelle	
2014 (26th)	Carlos Vives	
