= Merengón =

Compilation album by various artists
- Released: February 4, 1997
- Genre: Merengue
- Label: WEA Latina

Merengón is a merengue compilation album released by WEA Latina. In the US, it topped the Billboard Tropical Albums chart for five weeks.

== Track listing ==
No.	Title	Writer(s)	Performer(s)	Length
1.	"Ojitos Bellos"	Orlando Santana, S. Simmons	Grupo Manía	4:37
2.	"Esta Cache"	Raúl Acosta, D. Cloud	Oro Solido	3:45
3.	"Es Mentiroso"	Rodolfo Barreras, B. Lipscomb	Olga Tañón	4:02
4.	"Estúpida"		Toño Rosario	4:40
5.	"Besame Morenita"	Jesse Barish, Alvaro Dalmar	Grupo Wao	4:15
6.	"Sufriendo Por Ella"		Zafra Negra	4:43
7.	"Cachamba"	Lorenzo Dechalus, José Del Carmen Ramírez	Kinito Méndez	4:39
8.	"Esa No Es Mejor Que Yo"	Carlos David	Gisselle	4:45
9.	"Water Runs Dry"	Babyface	Sin Fronteras	4:04
10.	"Loco de Amor"	Orlando Santana, S. Simmons	Grupo Manía	4:08
11.	"Si Volvieras a Mi"	Alicia Baroni, J. Boxley	Mayra Mayra	3:39
12.	"Soltera"	Chery Jimenez / Chery X	New York Band	4:48

== Charts ==
Chart (1997)	Peak position
U.S. Billboard Tropical Albums	1

== See also ==
- List of number-one Billboard Tropical Albums from the 1990s
