= Y Sé Que Vas a Llorar =

1990 song by Marisela

Single by Marisela

from the album Hablemos Claro
- Released: 1990
- Genre: Latin pop
- Length: 3:19
- Label: Ariola
- Songwriter: Carlos Maria
- Producer: Enrique Elizondo

Marisela singles chronology
"Amarte es Genial" (1990)	"Y Sé Que Vas a Llorar" (1990)	"A Partir de Hoy" (1991)

"Y Sé Que Vas a Llorar" ("And I Know You're Going to Cry") is a song written by Carlos Maria and performed by Mexican American singer Marisela on her studio album Hablemos Claro (1990). The song reached #2 on the Hot Latin Songs chart, with the top position being held off by Ana Gabriel's song "Es Demasiado Tarde". The song was later covered by Puerto Rican merengue singer Manny Manuel on his second studio album Autentico (1996). Manuel's version became his second #1 song on the Tropical Airplay chart.

== Charts ==
=== Weekly charts ===
Chart (1991)	Peak position
US Hot Latin Songs (Billboard)	2

=== Year-end charts ===
Chart (1991)	Position
US Hot Latin Songs (Billboard)	14

== See also ==
- List of Billboard Tropical Airplay number ones of 1996
