= Dimensión Latina =

Venezuelan music group

Dimensión Latina is a salsa music band from Venezuela, and one of the notable names in the early history of salsa in the American continent. It was founded on March 15, 1972, in Caracas, Venezuela, by six young musicians: Jose "Joseíto" Rodríguez (musical director and timbales player), the pianist Enrique "Culebra" Iriarte, the trombonists César Augusto "Albóndiga" Anuel Morales and José Antonio "Rojitas" Rojas, the congas player Elio Pacheco and a vocalist that would soon become one of the most popular and influential singers and musicians in the history of Latin music in the American continent: the singer and bass player Oscar D'León.

Two years after its foundation, singer Wladimir Lozano joined the group. Wladimir formed with Oscar D'León a duet in Latin music, before Wladimir departed in 1978. The singers Argenis Carrullo, Rodrigo Mendoza and Andy Montañez were also members of Dimensión Latina.

In its long musical career, Dimensión Latina has earned numerous awards and trophies. Its fame and influence, characterized by the innovation and high quality of their powerful and elaborate choruses and unique arrangements, quickly handed over the Venezuelan border, earning success in its debut in New York in the "Salsa International" Festival in the Madison Square Garden (1977), and becoming one of the most popular salsa bands in Central and South America, as well as in many cities in the United States and Europe.

Among the national and international awards that Dimensión Latina has received are: in Venezuela: Six "Meridiano de Oro", two "Guaicaipuro de Oro", three "Musa de Oriente", three "Mara de Oro" and one "Mara de Platino". In Colombia: two "Congo de Oro". In Panamá: one "Buho de Oro".

Dimensión Latina is estimated to have sold approximately 30 million records and has performed in more than 3,000 live presentations.

== Discography ==
- 1972 : El Clan de Victor y Dimensión Latina (Oscar)
- 1973 : Triunfadores (Oscar)
- 1974 : En La Dimensión Latina (Oscar & Wladimir)
- 1975 : Dimensión Latina 75 (Oscar & Wladimir)
- 1976 : Dimensión Latina 76 (Oscar & Wladimir)
- 1977 : Dimensión Latina en Nueva York (Oscar & Wladimir), Dimensión Latina 77 (Wladimir), Los generales de la salsa (Andy & Wladimir & Rodrigo Mendoza), Dimensión Latina 78 (780 Kilos de Salsa) (Andy & Wladimir & Rodrigo Mendoza)
- 1978 : Dimensión Latina 79 (Andy & Rodrigo Mendoza), Tremenda Dimensión (Andy & Rodrigo Mendoza), Inconquistable (Andy & Rodrigo Mendoza)
- 1979 : Dimensión Latina, Combinación Latina No 4 (Andy & Carlos Jesús Guillen)
- 1980 : Para Siempre (Andy & Rodrigo Mendoza), El Número Uno con la Número Uno (Andy)
- 1981 : Cuerda para rato (Argenis Carruyo & Edgar Rodriguez)
- 1982 : 10 años repartiendo sals (Edgar Rodriguez & Freddy Nieto)
- 1984 : Producto de Exportación (Wladimir)

== Sources ==
- Oscardleon.com
- Un Viaje por La Dimensión Latina - Herencia Latina - Pictures, History, Discography, References in Spanish
- Book: El vinculo es la salsa - By Juan Carlos Baez
- Book: Situating Salsa - Global Markets and Local Meanings in Latin Popular Music - By Lise Waxer
- Book: The City of Musical Memory - By Lise Waxer
- Book: The Rough Guide to Cuban Music - By Philip Sweeney
- Book: World Music: The Rough Guide - By Frederick Dorian and others
- Oscar d'Leon - El sonero del mundo - SalsaFrance.com
- BBC - Radio 3 - World - Guide to World Music: Venezuela
