= Amor y Alegría =

Amor Y Alegría

Studio album by Luis Enrique
- Released: 1988
- Recorded: April 1988
- Studio: Ochoa Recording Studios (San Juan, Puerto Rico); Quadradial Recording Studios (Miami, Florida, USA)
- Genre: Salsa
- Label: Discos CBS International
- Producer: Luis Enrique · Camilo Valencia · Carlos "Cuco" Soto · Ángel Carrasco (Executive producer)

Luis Enrique chronology
Amor de Medianoche (1987)	Amor Y Alegría (1988)	Mi Mundo (1989)

Singles from Amor Y Alegría
- 1. "Comprendelo" Released: 1988; 2. "Desesperado" Released: 1988; 3. "Tu No Le Amas, Le Temes" Released: 1988; 4. "Volverte a Ver" Released: 1989; 5. "Tu Cuerpo" Released: 1989; 6. "Que Sera De Ti" Released: 1989

Amor y Alegria (English: Love and Joy) is the second studio album recorded by Nicaraguan salsa singer-songwriter Luis Enrique. The album was released by CBS Discos in 1988 (see 1988 in music). The album earned him international recognition as the album was produced during the salsa romantica era of the 1980s. Some of the songs are cuts from the previous album, Amor de Medianoche (1987).

== Singles ==
The album produced six singles that charted on the Hot Latin Tracks.

- Comprendelo (Understand) was the first single released from the album in 1988. The song reached No. 8 on the Hot Latin Tracks, the highest peaking single from the album.
- Desesperado (Hopeless) was the second single released from the album. The single is a cover of Emmanuel's song. This version peaked No. 10 on Hot Latin Tracks.
- Tu No Le Amas, Le Temes (You Don't Love Him, You Are Afraid of Him) was the third single released from the album and is considered one of his signature songs. The song peaked No. 12 on Hot Latin Tracks.
- Volverte a Ver (Seeing you again) The single is a cover of Dyango's song. Was the fourth single released from the album and charted No. 28 on the Hot Latin Tracks.
- Tu Cuerpo (Your Body) was the fifth single released from the album and charted No. 28 on Hot Latin Tracks.
- Que Sera de Ti (What Will Become of You?) was the sixth released from the album and charted No. 27 on the Hot Latin Tracks.

== Track listing ==
1. "Desesperado" (Glenn Monroig, K.C. Porter, Mark Spiro) – 3:50
2. "Tú No le Amas, le Temes" (Jorge Luís Piloto) – 4:27
3. "Compréndelo" (Luis Enrique Mejía) – 5:20
4. "Amor y Alegría" (Jorge Luis Piloto) – 4:46
5. "Tu Cuerpo" (Erasmo Carlos, Roberto Carlos, Buddy McCluskey) – 4:21
6. "Volverte a Ver" (Ray Girado, Amado Jaen) – 5:03
7. "Que Será de Ti" (Luis Enrique Mejía) – 4:38
8. "Tal Vez Un Día Amor" (Luis Enrique Mejía) – 4:40

== Credits and personnel ==
Músicos

Sesión de Puerto Rico:

- Luis Enrique – Voz, Conga, & Bongo
- Tommy Villarini – Trompeta, solo en "Desesperado"
- Angie Machado – Trompeta
- Rafy Torres – Trombón
- Carlos "Cuto" Soto – Trombón, Coros
- Eric Figueroa – Piano, Teclados
- Pedrito Perez – Bajo
- Chago Martinez – Timbal
- Tony Jiménez – Percusíones
- Jerry Medina – Coros
- Pichy Pérez – Coros
- Arreglos: Carlos "Cuto" Soto & Luis Enrique
- Ingeniero de Grabación: Hilton Colón
- Asistentes: Johnny Lebron & Diana Ortiz

Grabado en: OCHOA RECORDING STUDIOS, P.R., Abril 1988

Sesión de Miami:

- Luis Enrique – Voz, Percussion
- Robbie Driggs – Drum Programming
- Steve Rothstein – Keyboards Programming
- Manny López – Guitarra
- Rafael "California" Valencia – Bajo
- Tony Concepción – Trumpet & Flugel
- Dana Teboe – Trombone
- Arreglo: Camilo Valencia
- Ingeniero- Edward González

Grabado en: QUADRADIAL RECORDING STUDIOS

- Producción: Camilo Valencia & Luis Enrique
- Productor Ejecutivo: Ángel Carrasco
- Fotos: Donna Victor
- Ropa: Miami Dice
- Arte y Diseño Carátula: DRAGO
- Maquillaje y Peinado: Frank Tolosa

== Chart position ==
Year	Chart	Album	Peak
1989	Billboard Tropical/Salsa	Amor y Alegria	1

== Critical reception ==
Professional ratings
Review scores
Source	Rating
Allmusic	4.5/5 stars

José A. Estévez, Jr of Allmusic gave the album a positive review calling it "romantic salsa at its best". Amor y Alegría was nominated for a Lo Nuestro Award for Tropical Album of the Year in 1989.

== See also ==
- List of number-one Billboard Tropical Albums from the 1980s
