= Una Historia Diferente =

Studio album by Luis Enrique
- Released: 1991
- Genre: Salsa
- Label: Sony Discos
- Producer: José Gazmey, Luis Enrique

Luis Enrique chronology
Luces del Alma (1990)	Una Historia Diferente (1991)	En Vivo (1992)

Una Historia Diferente (A Different Story) is a studio album by Nicaraguan salsa singer Luis Enrique. It became his fourth album to top the Tropical Albums chart. José A. Estévez, Jr. of AllMusic rated it four-out-of-five stars stating while the album "may not have the elements of innovation and inventiveness that made the preceding Luces del Alma (1990) a wonder", it is still "pretty good, as the singer excels in a careful, high-quality production". The song "Lo Que Es Vivir" was nominated Tropical Song of the Year at the 5th Lo Nuestro Awards in 1993.

== Track listing ==
No.	Title	Writer(s)	Length
1.	"Fantasia"	Luis Lopez
2.	"Una Historia Diferente"	Omar Alfanno
3.	"Promesa de Mis Viejos"	Alfanno
4.	"El Amor Es Algo Mas"	Alfanno
5.	"Por Ti"
6.	"Lucia"	Jorge Luís Piloto
7.	"Lo Que Es Vivir"	Piloto
8.	"Como Ayer"	Victor Victor
9.	"Aun Asi"	Glenn Monroig
10.	"Quiero"	Edwin Apolinares, Luis Lopez

== Charts ==
Chart (1992)	Peak position
US Tropical Albums (Billboard)	1

== See also ==
- List of number-one Billboard Tropical Albums from the 1990s
