= Merengue en la Calle 8 '95 =

Compilation album by various artists
- Released: March 28, 1995
- Genre: Merengue
- Label: Rodven

Merengue en la Calle 8 '95 is a merengue compilation album released by Rodven Records. It topped the Tropical Albums chart for six weeks.

== Track listing ==
No.	Title	Writer(s)	Performer(s)	Length
1.	"Por la Plata Baila el Mono"	Wilfrido Vargas	Wilfrido Vargas	4:32
2.	"Salvaje"	Juan Marcelo	César Flores	4:35
3.	"El Tiburón"	Pavel DeJesus, J. Wilson, Nelson Zapata	Proyecto Uno	4:58
4.	"La Cuca"		Oro Solido	4:15
5.	"El Santo Cachón"	Romualdo Brito	Las Chicas del Can	4:39
6.	"Pitaste?"	Huchi Lora, Johnny Ventura	Johnny Ventura	4:09
7.	"Eres Tu"	Juan Carlos Calderón	Sergio Vargas	4:32
8.	"Soltero y Sabroso"	Antonio L. Rivera	Los Sobrosos del Merengue	4:45
9.	"Viene el Verano"	José Peña Suazo	Victor Roque	4:35
10.	"El Baila Bien"	Orlando Santana	Toño Rosario	4:50
11.	"A Partir de Mañana"	Alberto Cortéz	Zona Rosa	4:14
12.	"Cuando Yo Muera"	Julio Alvarado	Grupo Wao	4:18
13.	"La Ventanita"	Mickey Taveras	Garibaldi	4:09
14.	"La Grua"		Kinito Méndez	4:22

== Charts ==
Chart (1995)	Peak position
U.S. Billboard Tropical Albums	1

== See also ==
- List of number-one Billboard Tropical Albums from the 1990s
