= Mi Mundo (Luis Enrique album) =

Studio album by Luis Enrique
- Released: 1989
- Recorded: 1989
- Genre: Salsa
- Label: Discos CBS International
- Producer: Luis Enrique · Ángel Carrasco (Executive producer)

Luis Enrique chronology
Amor y Alegría (1988)	Mi Mundo (1989)	Luces del Alma (1990)

Singles from Mi Mundo
- 1. "Lo Que Pasó Entre Tú y Yo... Pasó" Released: 1989; 2. "Yo No Puedo Ser Tu Amante" Released: 1989; 3. "Mi Mundo" Released: 1990; 4. "Solo" Released: 1990

Professional ratings
Review scores
Source	Rating
Allmusic	4.5/5 stars

Mi Mundo (English: My World) is the third studio album recorded by Nicaraguan-American salsa singer-songwriter Luis Enrique. The album was released by CBS Discos in 1989. It became one of the best selling tropical albums in the 1980s. The album was given a Premio Lo Nuestro award for "Tropical Album of the Year" in 1990.

== Track listing ==
1. "Solo" (Luis Enrique Mejía) – 4:41
2. "Mi Mundo" (Jorge Luis Piloto) – 4:43
3. "Corazón Loco" (Luis Enrique Mejía) – 4:38
4. "Yo No Puedo Ser Tu Amante" (Manny Benito, Alejandro Jaén) – 4:20
5. "San Juan Sin Ti" (Omar Alfanno) – 4:08
6. "Lo Que Pasó Entre Tú y Yo...Pasó" (Jorge Luis Piloto) – 3:39
7. "Llegó el Amor" (Luis Enrique Mejía) – 4:56
8. "Una Nueva Canción" (Luis Enrique Mejía) – 4:32

== Credits and personnel ==
- Luis Enrique – congas, percussion, primary artist

Mixed by Adalberto (Eddie) Rivera

== Chart position ==
Year	Chart	Album	Peak
1989	U.S. Billboard Tropical/Salsa	Mi Mundo	1
