= De La Luz =

Studio album by Orquesta de la Luz
- Released: 15 October 1990
- Genre: Salsa
- Length: 45:18
- Label: RCA
- Producer: Kiyoshi Teranishi, Sergio George

Orquesta de la Luz chronology
De La Luz (1990)	Sin Fronteras (1991)

De La Luz (also released as Salsa Caliente del Japón in select regions) is the debut studio album by Japanese salsa musical group Orquesta de la Luz. It was nominated for Tropical/Salsa Album of the Year at the Lo Nuestro Awards.

== Track listing ==
This information adapted from AllMusic.

No.	Title	Writer(s)	Length
1.	"Salsa Caliente del Japón"	Gen Ogmi	4:55
2.	"Solo un Juego"	Shiro Seino	4:57
3.	"Tu Eres el Hombre"	Maria Teresa Diego	4:33
4.	"Tu Me Llenas"	Johnny Ortiz	4:08
5.	"Salsa Es Mi Energia"	Gen Ogmi, Shiro Seino	4:56
6.	"Acaba Ya"		4:36
7.	"Tanto Te Amé"	Mario Diaz	4:24
8.	"Cuero Sono"		3:56
9.	"No Me Lleves Contigo"	Johnny Ortiz	4:27
10.	"There's Nothing Better Than Love"	Luther Vandross, Skip Anderson	4:26

== Chart performance ==
Chart (1990)	Peak position
U.S. Billboard Tropical Albums	1

== See also ==
- List of number-one Billboard Tropical Albums from the 1990s
