= El Primero (album) =

El primero

Studio album by Juan Manuel Lebrón
- Released: May 14, 1990
- Genre: Salsa
- Label: EMI
- Producer: E. Nevarez

Singles from El primero
- 1. "Ella y tu" Released: July 1990

El primero (The First One) is a studio album recorded by Puerto Rican singer Juan Manuel Lebrón released in 1990. The album became his first number-one album on the Billboard Tropical Albums chart. It was nominated for Tropical/Salsa Album of the Year at the Lo Nuestro Awards.

== Track listing ==
This information adapted from Allmusic.

No.	Title	Writer(s)	Length
1.	"El primero"	Juan Calderon, Luis Gómez-Escolar
2.	"A ti no te ha dicho"
3.	"Ese embuste"
4.	"No es verdad"
5.	"Sentirte cerca"
6.	"Solos esta noche"
7.	"Ella y tu"	Jose T. Martinez
8.	"Lo mejor que hiciste"
9.	"Cara de niña"

== Chart performance ==
Chart (1990)	Peak position
U.S. Billboard Tropical Albums	1

== See also ==
- List of number-one Billboard Tropical Albums from the 1990s
