= Nino Segarra =

Puerto Rican musician (born 1953)

- Born: Juan Angel Segarra Crespo; June 21, 1953 (age 73); Maricao, Puerto Rico
- Genre: Salsa and Boleros
- Occupations: Singer, composer, musician and musical arranger.
- Instruments: drums, guitar and cuatro

Juan Angel Segarra Crespo (born June 21, 1953), known professionally as Nino Segarra is a Puerto Rican singer, composer, musician and musical arranger.

== Early years ==
Segarra was born on June 21, 1953 in Maricao, Puerto Rico. He received his primary and secondary education in his hometown. Luis Millán, from Segarra's hometown of Maricao, PR, discovered the young Segarra's musical talent at the age of 14. Under his guidance, Segarra started with the guitar as his first instrument. In 1976, he played the drums and guitar for various local bands, When he was 16 years old, Segarra auditioned for the role of guitar player and was hired by a band called "The Monarc", however a year later he joined another band "Mundo de Ponce" with whom he made his first recording and musical arrangement.

Segarra obtained his bachelor's degree in Applied Music, specializing in voice, arrangements, and composition, as well as another degree in music education from the Inter-American University in San Germán, Puerto Rico, He earned his bachelor's degree with a major in music.

== Musical arranger and composer ==
Segarra began making musical arrangements for theater productions and symphony orchestras. By 1988, he had made arrangements for Andy Montañez, Marvin Santiago, Eddie Santiago and Oscar de Leon. Segarra also produced and made the musical arrangements for his own songs. Among them Con la Musica por dentro (With Music Inside), El Maestro (The Teacher), Solo por Tí (Only for you), Loco de Amor (Crazy for Love) and Porque te Amo (Because I Love You) (written by Alberto Testa and Giampiero Felisatti in Italy and sung for the first time by Mina with the name "Più di così" in 1984 and only later translated by Pedro Arroyo in 1990), which became a number one hit in the Hispanic community of the United States, Puerto Rico and the rest of Latin-America.

== Albums ==
- Orquesta Condimento (1982)
- Que Viva la Salsa (1987)
- La Fuente (1989)
- Con la Música Por Dentro (1990)
- Entre la Espada y la Pared (1991)
- Loco de Amor (1992)
- El Maestro (1994)
- Solo Por Ti (1995)
- Somos Uno En Navidad (1995)
- Éxitos y Más Éxitos (1995)
- Cha Cha Cha, Merengue, Salsa (1997)
- Romántico Salsero (1998)
- Vivo Por Ella (2004)
- Protagonistas De La Salsa: De Puerto Rico al Barrio (2004)
- Protagonistas De La Salsa: Nuestra Salsa (2005)
- De Nino a Nino: Homenaje a Nino Bravo (2007)
- Vida (2009)
- 30 Años de Trayectoria Musical (2012)
- 20 Duos En Salsa Vol I (2018)
- Una Parte De Mi (2019)
- Antillana Musical (2020)
- Medley Boleros Homenaje A Lalo Rodriguez (2023)
- Con La Musica Por Fuera (2024)

== Recordings ==
External audio
- You may listen to Nino Segarra's "Entre La Espada y La Pared" on YouTube.

Amongst some of his recordings are the following:

- Darlo Todo O Nada
- Te Amo Y Me Amas
- Probemos Como Amantes
- Te Deseo
- Me Parece*
- Me Separo De Tu Vida
- Chiquilla
- Ajena
- Mas
- Potpourri "Homenaje A Puerto Rico": Romance Del Campesino / Amanecer Borinca
- Entre La Espada Y La Pared
- Entiéndeme
- Eres La Única
- Ha Sido Un Golpe Muy Bajo
- Oh Mama
- Escúchame
- Ven A Mi Lado
- Labios Virginales
- Porque Tu
- Digan Lo Que Digan
- Y Nos Amamos
- Ella Es En Mi Vida
- Con La Puerta Cerrada
- Como Yo Te Ame
- Solo Por Ti
- Me Imagino
- Boleros De Felipe Pirela: Unicamente Tu/Sombras, Me Estas Matando De Mas

On November 10, 1998, Segarra released the album Romantico Salsero, which became a hit. On September 21, 2001, Segarra joined Eddie Santiago, Willie Gonzalez and David Pabon in a salsa concert held in Medellín, Colombia. Segarra and Pabon participated in the first International Cup of Salsa celebrated in Lima, Peru, on July 17, 2004. There he sang one of his compositions Vivo por Ella (I live for her), which he dedicated to the late Tito Puente. He also toured Venezuela, Peru and the United States.

== Charts ==
=== Albums ===
List of albums, with selected chart positions, sales figures, and certifications
Title	Album details	Peak chart positions
Title	Album details	US Tropical Albums
Con La Musica Por Dentro	Released: 1990; Label: Musical Productions	3
Entre La Espada y La Pared	Released: 1991; Label: Musical Productions	4

=== Singles ===
List of singles, with selected chart positions and certifications, showing year released and album name
Title	Year	Peak chart positions	Album
Title	Year	US Latin Songs	Album
"Porque Te Amo"	1990	28	Con La Musica Por Dentro
"Como Amigo Si, Como Amante No"	1990	20	Con La Musica Por Dentro
"Eres La Unica"	1991	29	Entre La Espada y La Pared
"Entre La Espada y La Pared"	1992	34	Entre La Espada y La Pared

== Later years ==
Among those influenced by Nino Segarra was his cousin Eddie Segarra who is the lead vocalist and percussionist of "Kinkajou" a salsa and merengue band whose base of operations is located in Dallas, Texas.

== See also ==
- List of Puerto Rican songwriters
