= Angel Javier =

Puerto Rican singer

Angel Carrión Torres, better known as Angel Javier is a Puerto Rican salsa singer. Born on August 25 in San Juan, Puerto Rico, he is known for his hits "Que Hermoso Es" and "Quiero Amarte al Aire Libre". "Quiero Amarte al Aire Libre" peaked at number 19 on the Billboard Hot Latin Songs in the US. His debut album, En Cada Lugar (1990) topped the Billboard Tropical Albums chart. Javier was nominated Tropical New Artist of the Year at the 3rd Annual Lo Nuestro Awards in 1991.
