= Luis Enrique (singer) =

Nicaraguan-American salsa singer-songwriter and musician

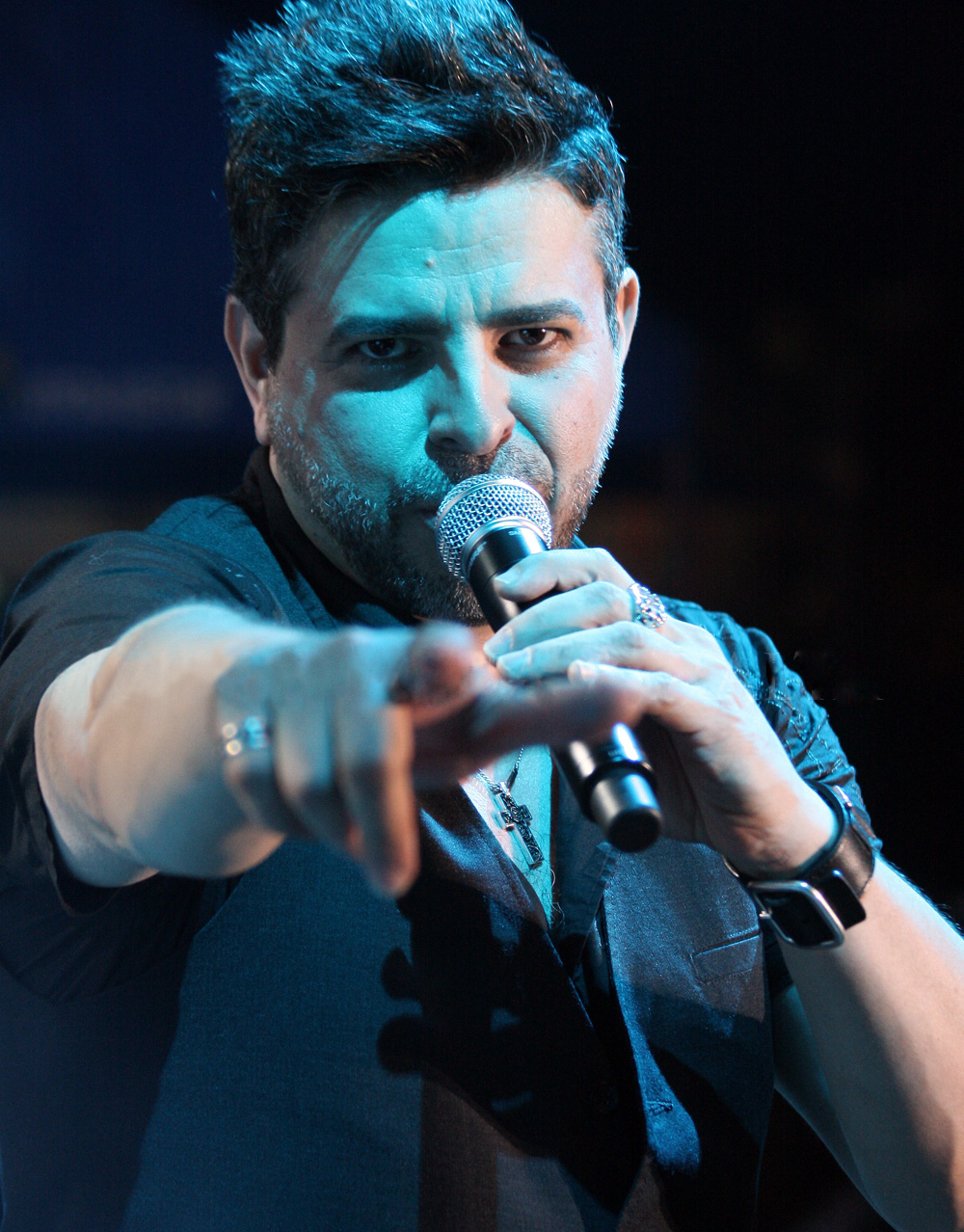
- Luis Enrique at the Premios Lo Nuestro 2010 awards

Background information
- Born: September 28, 1962 (age 63); Somoto, Madriz, Nicaragua
- Origin: Miami, Florida
- Genres: Salsa; tropical; latin pop; soft rock; latin ballad
- Years active: 1973–present
- Label: Top Stop Music

Luis Enrique Mejía López (born September 28, 1962) is a Nicaraguan-American singer-songwriter and musician. He is known as "El Príncipe de la Salsa" (The Prince of Salsa). A grammy-award-winning artist, he has released over 20 albums and achieved widespread success, including his single "Yo No Sé Mañana" which was awarded a Latin Grammy Award for "Best Tropical Song".

With nearly 30 years in the music industry, he has accomplished several gold and platinum albums. During his peak he also performed as a session musician and provided percussion for many other artists including Ricky Martin, Foreigner, Juan Luis Guerra, Chayanne and others. He also worked in other genres such as merengue and pop.

== Early life and education ==
Luis Enrique was born in the small town of Somoto, Nicaragua, to a family of musical artists. He is the son of Francisco Luis Mejia Godoy, and nephew of Luis Enrique Mejia Godoy and Carlos Mejia Godoy. His brother, Ramon Mejia, better known as "Perrozompopo" is also a Latin Grammy nominated artist for Best Alternative Music Album.

At the age of 15 he moved to the United States in 1978 with his mother, and attended La Serna High School in Whittier, California. His enrollment in a music class in high school was his only formal training.

== Career ==
Luis Enrique began his career in the late 1980s and achieved success then and in the 1990s. He was one of the leading pioneers that led to the salsa romántica movement in the 1980s. Enrique has received two Grammy Award-nomination for "Best Tropical Latin Performance" for album Luces del Alma and his song "Amiga". He performed and recorded with salsa romántica group Sensation 85, which also included La Palabra and Nestor Torres. On May 19, 2009, his album Ciclos was nominated for numerous Latin Grammy Awards, his biggest breakthrough in over a decade. The album won the Grammy Award for Best Tropical Latin Album and also contained the hit single "Yo No Sé Mañana".

He hosted the first season of Objetivo Fama in 2004, a Puerto Rican singing competition show. He won two Latin Grammys and the Grammy for Best Tropical Latin Album in 2010. In 2015 he was a judge on La Voz Peru for its third season.

== Personal life ==
He mentioned in an interview with Billboard that his top five favorite salsa singers are Ruben Blades, Celia Cruz, Johnny Pacheco, Louie Ramirez, and Oscar D'Leon.

He currently resides in Miami, Florida. He has one son, Luca Enrique Mejia.

He released an autobiography in 2017 titled "Autobiografía".

== Awards and nominations ==
"Yo No Sé Mañana" received a Latin Grammy Award for "Best Tropical Song" and a nomination for Song of the Year. The song was nominated at the 2010 Lo Nuestro Awards for Tropical Song of the Year. The song was awarded a Billboard Latin Music award for "Tropical Airplay – Song of the Year".

The Lo Nuestro Awards are awarded annually by American network Univision. Luis Enrique received one award in 1989.

| Year | Nominee / work | Award | Result |
|---|---|---|---|
| 1989 | Himself | Tropical/Salsa New Artist of the Year | Won |
| 1989 | Himself | Tropical/Salsa Male Artist of the Year | Nominated |
| 1989 | Amor y Alegría | Tropical/Salsa Album of the Year | Nominated |
| 1989 | "Tu No Le Amas, Le Temes" | Tropical/Salsa Song of the Year | Nominated |
| 1990 | Himself | Tropical/Salsa Male Artist of the Year | Won |
| 1990 | Mi Mundo | Tropical/Salsa Album of the Year | Won |
| 1990 | "Lo Que Pasó Entre Tu y Yo... Pasó" | Tropical/Salsa Song of the Year | Won |

== Discography ==
Studio albums

- Amor de Media Noche (1987)
- Amor y Alegría (1988)
- Mi Mundo (1989)
- Luces del Alma (1990)
- Una Historia Diferente (1991)
- Dilema (1993)
- Luis Enrique (1994)
- Genesis (1996)
- Timbalaye (1999)
- Evolución (2000)
- Transparente (2002)
- Dentro Y Fuera (2007)
- Ciclos (2009)
- Soy y Seré (2011)
- Jukebox: Primera Edición (2014)
- Tiempo Al Tiempo (with C4 Trío) (2019)
- El Alma en Clave (2026)
