= Oscar D'León =

Venezuelan salsa musician (born 1943)

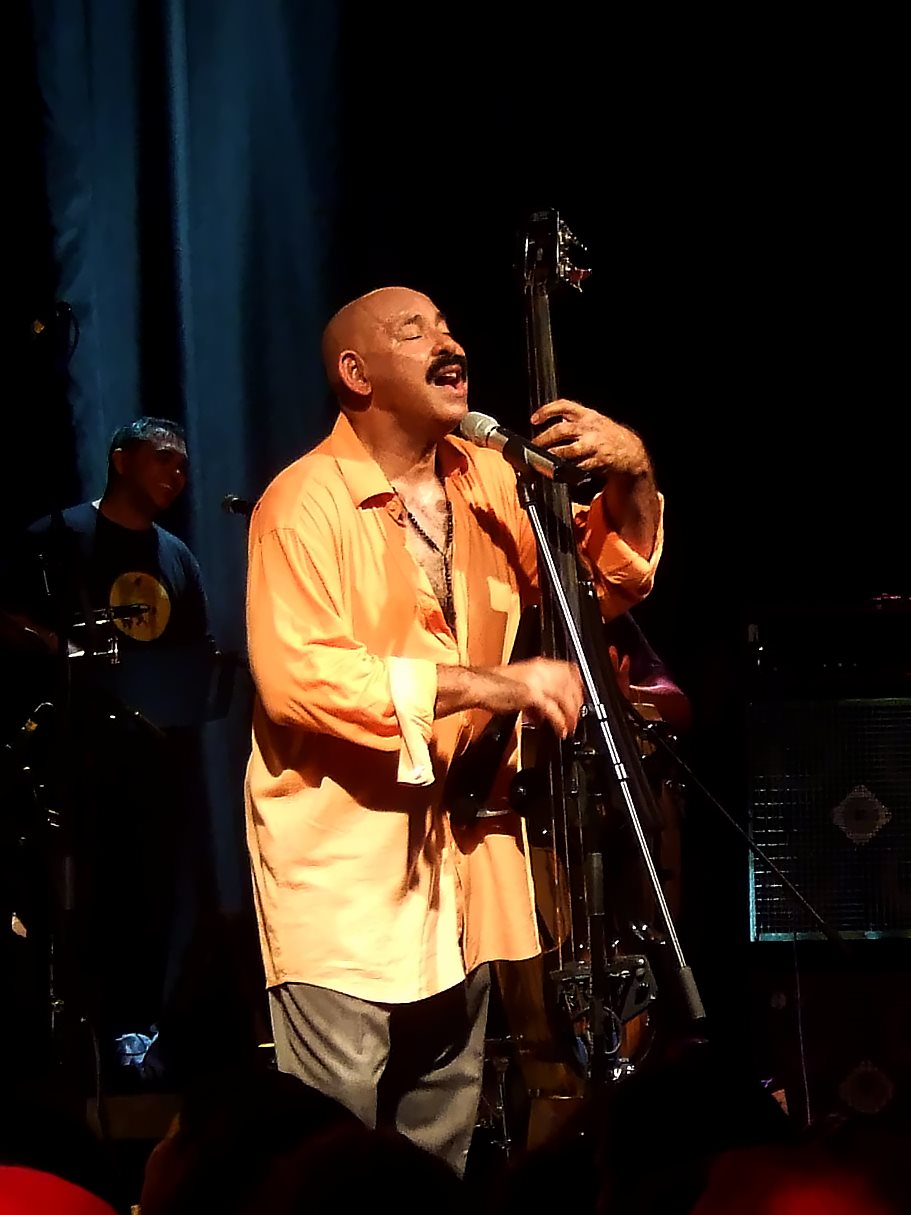
- D'León in 2009

Background information
- Born: Óscar Emilio León Simosa; July 11, 1943 (age 83); Caracas, Venezuela
- Genre: Salsa
- Occupation: Musician
- Instrument: Bass
- Label: Top Hits

Óscar Emilio León Simosa (born July 11, 1943), known as Oscar D'León, and affectionately called The Pharaoh of Salsa, The Lion of Salsa, and the World's Sonero, is a Venezuelan musician and bassist best known for his salsa music. He is the author of Llorarás, which he recorded in 1974 with his group, Dimensión Latina. He is also an ambassador for Operation Smile.

== Early life ==
Oscar D'León was a long-time resident of the Parroquia Antímano section of Caracas, Venezuela (his father was a laborer at the neighborhood cemetery). He had a strong interest in percussion ever since he was a child, improvising bass parts with his throat while playing Latin rhythms with his hands on any available surface. He got in trouble in school early on for doing this constantly. He then took interest in the upright bass (he learned the instrument on his own), and would eventually alternate in jobs as an auto mechanic, assembly line worker or taxi driver (during the day) and bass player (at night) for local 'conjuntos' [literally means an "assembly", but represents a small musical band popularized in Cuba, whereby musicians on bass, guitar, and percussion would all sing local folk songs]. As he acquired a reputation for being a solid bass player, clever improviser (he would improvise entire songs on the spot), humorous entertainer and dynamic singer (he used to dance with a double bass onstage while singing, a not-so-subtle physical feat), he founded orchestras such as La Golden Star and music groups such as Los Psicodélicos. Together with percussionist José Rodríguez and trombone players César Monge and José Antonio Rojas, he formed Dimensión Latina in 1972.

Four years later, D'León quit the group and created La Salsa Mayor. With La Salsa Mayor he recorded the merengue standard "Juanita Morell", a version that became a radio hit in Puerto Rico. He later founded La Crítica in 1978 in memory of the legends of Cuban rumba, such as Miguelito Valdés. For a while, D'León would alternate singing with both orchestras, giving him enough flexibility to stay working constantly.

== Career ==
During the 1980s, D'León achieved recognition in salsa music, becoming a known Caribbean music singer. In 1982, he visited Cuba. His visit was a major cultural event in the island country. Since local tastes in music had veered away from the traditional sounds of Cuban music, in part because many of the major Cuban stars of the past had either died or were living elsewhere in exile, D'León's "retro" style of music became very popular among Cubans of all ages.

Meanwhile, he got tired of carrying around his double bass, "and opening the case in baggage claim at the airport only to find it reduced down to toothpicks." Therefore, he gave up playing a bass onstage. He also started shaving his head regularly, as to not bother with hair loss any longer. He would, however, never shave off his trademark mustache.

Because of successful tours throughout America and Spain, D'León was the first Latino to sign a contract with the BBC. He has also performed in Japan, where he shocked a television host by heartedly recommending sexual intercourse as the key component of a healthy lifestyle during a live interview.

== Personal life ==
Oscar D'León has been a direct or indirect victim of various robberies, among them when he was robbed of $16,000 , and when a plaque dedicated to him was stolen in Barquisimeto nine hours after he had been honored with it and the city's keys on September 13, 2014.

== Discography ==
Contributing artist

- The Rough Guide to Salsa (1997, World Music Network)

Albums

- Dimensión Latina '75 (1974)
- Dimensión Latina '76 Salsa Brava (1975)
- Dimensión Latina En Nueva York (1976)
- Con Bajo y Todo (1976)
- 2 Sets Con Oscar (1977)
- El "Oscar" de la Salsa (1977)
- Dos Sets Con Oscar D'Leon Y Su Salsa Mayor (1977)
- Tranquilo Y Sin Miedo (1978)
- El Más Grande (1979)
- Llegó...Actuó...Y...Triunfó..! (1979)
- Al Frente De Todos (1980)
- A Mí Sí Me Gusta Así! (1981)
- El Discóbolo (1982)
- Con Dulzura... (1983)
- El Sabor De Oscar (1983)
- Con Cariño (1983)
- Yo Soy (1985)
- Oscar '86 (1986)
- De Venezuela Para El Mundo (1987)
- Riquiti..! (1987)
- Que se sienta (1988)
- Navidad con Oscar D'León (1989)
- En Puerto Rico (1990)
- El Rey de los Soneros (1992)
- Así soy (2004)
- Fuzionando (2006)
- En Vivo (2012)
- Clásicos de Big Band (2014)

== Awards and distinctions ==
D'León was named Best Salsa Artist at the 2014 Pepsi Venezuela Music Awards.

On July 7, 2015, he received a Honoris Causa PhD of the Universidad Pedagógica Experimental Libertador for being "a Venezuelan whose discipline and constancy in the development and execution of his musical art have led him to become artistic patrimony of Venezuela".
