= 1990 in Latin music =

This is a list of notable events in Latin music (music from the Spanish- and Portuguese-speaking areas of Latin America, Europe, and the United States) that took place in 1990.

== Events ==
- January 10 – EMI Latin bought Bob Grever's Cara Records, beginning the golden age of Tejano music.
- February 21 – The 32nd Annual Grammy Awards are held at the Shrine Auditorium in Los Angeles, California.
  - José Feliciano wins the Grammy Award for Best Latin Pop Performance for his rendition of "Cielito Lindo"
  - Ray Barretto and Celia Cruz wins the Grammy Award for Best Tropical Performance for their album Ritmo en el Corazón
  - Los Lobos wins the Grammy Award for Best Mexican-American Performance for their album La Pistola y El Corazón.
- February 10 – "Lambada" by French-Brazilian group Kaoma becomes the first non-Spanish-language song to top the Billboard Hot Latin Tracks chart. The song is performed entirely in Portuguese.
- May 23 – Billboard commences its first ever Latin Music Conference at the Hyatt Hotel in Miami, Florida.
- May 24 – The 3rd Annual Lo Nuestro Awards are held at the James L. Knight Center in Miami, Florida. Nicaraguan singer Luis Enrique is the most awarded artist with three wins.

== Number-ones albums and singles by country ==
- List of number-one albums of 1990 (Spain)
- List of number-one singles of 1990 (Spain)
- List of number-one Billboard Top Latin Albums of 1990
- List of number-one Billboard Hot Latin Tracks of 1990

== Awards ==
- 1990 Premio Lo Nuestro
- 1990 Tejano Music Awards

== Albums released ==
=== First-quarter ===
==== January ====
Day	Title	Artist	Genre(s)	Singles	Label
4	Con El Mariachi Vargas de Tecalitlan	José Luis Rodríguez	Mariachi, Ranchera		CBS, CBS Discos International
15	Goza Mi Timbal	Tito Puente	Latin Jazz		Concord Picante

==== February ====
Day	Title	Artist	Genre(s)	Singles	Label
6	Roberto Carlos '87	Roberto Carlos	MPB, Ballad		CBS Inc.
6	Roberto Carlos '88	Roberto Carlos	MPB		Discos CBS International

==== March ====
Day	Title	Artist	Genre(s)	Singles	Label
6	Pegando Fuego	Las Chicas del Can	Merengue, Synth-Pop		Sonotone
6	Caribe	Las Chicas del Can	Merengue		Cosmo Records
6	Más Que un Loco	Wilfrido Vargas	Merengue, Salsa		Sonotone, Sonotone Latin Records
7	Invasion de la Privacidad	Eddie Santiago	Salsa		TH-Rodven
7	Rumbamania	Rumba Tres	Rumba, Disco		Red Bullet

=== Second-quarter ===
==== April ====
Day	Title	Artist	Genre(s)	Singles	Label
13	Boca Rosa	Angela Carrasco	Bachata, Vocal, Latin		EMI
13	Cae la Noche	Dyango	Ballad		EMI
13	Si Estuvieras Conmigo	Álvaro Torres	Ballad		Capitol/EMI Latin
13	Ese Hombres Es...	Angela Carrasco			
24	Dedicado al Amor	Nelson Ned			TH-Rodven

==== May ====
Day	Title	Artist	Genre(s)	Singles	Label
14	El Primero	Juan Manuel Lebrón	Salsa		Capitol/EMI Latin, Leader Records
15	Vivencias	Yolandita Monge			Discos CBS International
15	Dos Corazónes	Vicente Fernández and Vikki Carr			
15	Enamorarse	Nicola di Bari			Discos CBS International
16	Tu Amante Romántico	Paquito Guzmán	Salsa		TH-Rodven
16	En Vivo Y... A Todo Color	Frankie Ruiz	Salsa		TH-Rodven, TH-Rodven
16	El Eterno Enamorado	Andy Montañez	Salsa, Guaguanco		TH-Rodven, TH-Rodven
16	...Es De Verdad!	David Pabón	Salsa, Guaguanco		TH-Rodven, TH-Rodven
22	Somos el Son	Raphy Leavitt y Su Orquesta La Selectra			
22	Musa Original	Joe Arroyo	Salsa, Compas, Cumbia, Guaracha		Discos Fuentes
22	El Baile	Wilfrido Vargas	Merengue		Sonotone Latin Records
22	Animation	Wilfrido Vargas	Merengue		Bat Discos
22	La Tropicalisima	La Sonora Dinamita	Cumbia		Discos Fuentes

==== June ====
Day	Title	Artist	Genre(s)	Singles	Label
5	Garibaldi	Garibaldi			EMI
20	Aprenderé	Max Torres	Salsa		Capitol/EMI
20	Peligroso Amor	Max Torres	Salsa		Capitol/EMI Latin

=== Third-quarter ===
==== July ====
Day	Title	Artist	Genre(s)	Singles	Label
19	Part-Time Lover	Bobby Valentín	Salsa		Bronco

==== September ====
Day	Title	Artist	Genre(s)	Singles	Label
19	El Mismo Romantico	Paquito Guzman	Salsa, Bolero, Merengue		Capitol/EMI Latin, Capitol/EMI Latin

=== Fourth-quarter ===
==== October ====
Day	Title	Artist	Genre(s)	Singles	Label
15	Salsa Caliente Del Japón	Orquesta de la Luz	Salsa		Bat Discos, Bat Discos
15	Imágenes	Lourdes Robles	Ballad		Discos CBS International
18	Siempre Wilfrido	Wilfrido Vargas	Merengue, Bachata		Sonotone
25	Voz, Ritmo Y Sentimiento	Sophy	Ballad, Merengue, Salsa		Discos CBS International, Discos CBS International
25	Etiqueta Negra	Milly y los Vecinos	Salsa, Merengue		Discos CBS International
25	Acabando!	Los Hermanos Rosario	Merengue	"Borron y Cuenta Nueva" "Adolescente"	Aires
25	Justo a Tiempo	Roberto Del Castillo	Merengue		Discos CBS International
25	Laberinto de Amor	Yolandita Monge	Latin, Ballad, Vocal		Discos CBS International
25	Banana	The Rebels			Hispavox
Unknown	Mujer contra mujer	Sandra Mihanovich and Celeste Carballo			

==== November ====
Day	Title	Artist	Genre(s)	Singles	Label
12	Ven Conmigo	Selena	Tejano, Cumbia, Latin Pop	"Ya Ves" "Baila Esta Cumbia" "No Quiero Saber"	Capitol/EMI Latin

==== December ====
Day	Title	Artist	Genre(s)	Singles	Label
8	A Night at Kimball's East	Poncho Sanchez		"Jumpin' With Symphony Sid"	Concord Picante
20	Con Tanto Amor	La Mafia			CBS

=== Dates unknown ===
Title	Artist	Genre(s)	Singles	Label
Timeless	Little Joe	Conjunto, Tejano		Discos CBS International
Salsa con Clase	Johnny & Ray	Salsa, Guaracha	"Mascarada" "Margarita"	Polygram Latino, Polygram Latino
Amor y Alegría	Luis Enrique	Salsa		CBS
Quién como tú	Ana Gabriel	Ballad, Romantic, Vocal		CBS
Tengo Derecho a Ser Feliz	José Luis Rodríguez	Ballad		CBS Discos International, CBS
Nouveau Flamenco	Ottmar Liebert	Flamenco	"Barcelona Nights"	Higher Octave Music
Autobiografia	Duncan Dhu			Sire, Warner Bros. Records, GASA
Viti at Work	Viti Ruiz	Salsa, Cha-Cha		Capitol/EMI Latin, Capitol/EMI Latin
Lo Mío Es Amor	Tony Vega	Salsa, Guaguanco		RMM Records, RMM Records
20 Años	Luis Miguel	Bolero, Ballad, Latin Pop		WEA Latina
Color Americano	Willie Colón	Salsa		CBS
Aguita de Melon	Fito Olivares	Cumbia		Gil Records
Bandido	Azúcar Moreno	Flamenco, Euro House, Rumba	"Bandido" "A Caballo"	Epic
Punto de Vista	Gilberto Santa Rosa	Salsa	"Vivir Sin Ella" "Perdoname" "Impaciencia"	CBS Discos Latin Dance
Para Adoloridos	Los Tigres del Norte	Ranchera, Corrido, Norteno, Conjunto, Ballad		Fonovisa
Abriendo Puertas	Jerry Rivera	Salsa		CBS Discos Latin Dance
Entre Lineas	Alejandro Lerner	Ballad, Soft Rock		Ariola
Éxitos de Gloria Estefan	Gloria Estefan	Synth-Pop, Ballad	"Conga" "Regresa a Mi" "No Te Olvidaré"	CBS Discos International, CBS Discos International
En Vivo	Ana Gabriel			CBS Discos International
Pajaro Herido	Roberto Carlos	MPB, Ballad, Vocal		Discos CBS International
Para Nuestra Gente	Mazz	Tejano, Conjunto		Capitol/EMI Latin
Luces del Alma	Luis Enrique	Salsa, Vocal	"Date un Chance" "Aventura" "Amiga"	Discos CBS International
Filosofía Barata y Zapatos de Goma	Charly García	Pop rock		Discos CBS International
Canción Animal	Soda Stereo	Pop rock	"(En) El Septimo Dia" "Cancion Animal" "De Musica Ligera"	Discos CBS International
Mientras Ustedes No Dejen De Aplaudir	Vicente Fernández	Ranchera		CBS Discos International
Bachata Rosa	Juan Luis Guerra & 4.40	Bachata, Merengue, Salsa	"Carta de Amor" "La Bilirrubina" "Burbujas de Amor"	BMG, BMG, Karen Records, Karen Records
Cielo de Tambores	Grupo Niche	Salsa	"Una Aventura"	CBS
Amor Fasciname	Alejandra Ávalos	Ballad		WEA
Cuando Yo Amo	Rudy La Scala	Ballad, Chanson		Sonotone
Xuxa 1	Xuxa	Vocal		Globo Records
Niña	José Feliciano			Capitol/EMI Latin, Capitol/EMI Latin
Tiempo de Vals	Chayanne	Ballad		CBS Discos International
El Que Mas Te Ha Querido	David Lee Garza y los Musicales	Tejano		Capitol/EMI Latin
Las Clasicas de José Alfredo Jiménez	Vicente Fernández	Ranchera	"Camino de Guanajuato"	Discos CBS International
El Cantinero	Jossie Esteban y la Patrulla 15	Merengue		Top Ten Hits
Con la Musica por Dentro	Nino Segarra	Salsa	"Porque Te Amo" "Soy Tu Amante" "Como Amigo Si, Como Amante No"	Musical Productions, Musical Productions
Tito Puente Presents Millie P.	Tito Puente and Millie P.	Salsa, Descarga		CBS Discos International, CBS, RMM Records
Extranjero	Franco De Vita	Ballad		Discos CBS International
Vida	Emmanuel	Latin, Ballad		CBS, CBS Discos International
Amigo	Bronco	Cumbia, Norteno, Ballad		Fonovisa
Good Boys Wear White	La Sombra	Tejano, Polka, Cumbia, Ranchera, Ballad		Freddie Records
Milagro	Rocky Hernández	Tejano		CBS Discos Inc.
Sensual	Tito Rojas	Salsa		Musical Productions
Algo Nuevo	Anthony Cruz	Salsa		Musical Productions
Dejame Vivir	Tito Nieves	Salsa		RMM Records
Nuevo Pequeño Catálogo de Seres y Estares	El Último de la Fila	Pop rock		Capitol/EMI Latin
Señales de Vida	Luis Angel	Ballad		CBS Discos International
En las Buenas y las Malas	José José		"Amnesia"	Ariola
Si Te Pudiera Mentir	Rocío Dúrcal	Ballad		Ariola
Homenaje	Lola Flores	Pop Rap, Flamenco		Discos CBS International
Portfolio	Yolandita Monge	Ballad		Discos CBS International
Canto a La Humanidad	Danny Rivera	Ballad		CBS, CBS Discos International
Eternamente Bella	Alejandra Guzmán	Pop rock, Ballad		Fonovisa, Inc.
Esta Vez	José Luis Rodríguez			CBS
Nadie Como Tu	Palomo San Basilio			
Nuevos Caminos	Roberto Pulido	Tejano		Capitol/EMI Latin, Capitol/EMI Latin
Misión La Cima	Vico C	Pop Rap, Merengue, Hip-House		Prime Records
Mas Canciones	Linda Ronstadt	Mariachi	"Tata Dios" "El Toro Relajo" "Siempre Hace Frio"	Elektra

== Best-selling records ==
=== Best-selling albums ===
The following is a list of the top 5 best-selling Latin albums of 1990 in the United States in the categories of Latin pop, Regional Mexican, and Tropical/salsa, according to Billboard.

Category	Rank	Album	Artist
Latin pop	1	Quiero Amanecer con Alguien	Daniela Romo
Latin pop	2	Quién como tú	Ana Gabriel
Latin pop	3	Sonrie	Roberto Carlos
Latin pop	4	Tierra de Nadie	Ana Gabriel
Latin pop	5	Con El Mariachi Vargas de Tecalitlan	José Luis Rodríguez
Regional Mexican	1	A Todo Galope	Bronco
Regional Mexican	2	No Te Olvidaré	Mazz
Regional Mexican	3	Mi Buena Suerte	Los Tigres del Norte
Regional Mexican	4	Por Tu Maldito Amor	Vicente Fernandez
Regional Mexican	5	A Tu Recuerdo	Los Yonic's
Tropical/Salsa	1	Mi Mundo	Luis Enrique
Tropical/Salsa	2	Más Grande Que Nunca	Frankie Ruiz
Tropical/Salsa	3	Ojalá Que Llueva Café	Juan Luis Guerra & 4.40
Tropical/Salsa	4	El Primero	Juan Manuel Lebrón
Tropical/Salsa	5	El Cantinero	La Patrulla 15

=== Best-performing songs ===
The following is a list of the top 10 best-performing Latin songs in the United States in 1990, according to Billboard.

Rank	Single	Artist
1	"El Cariño Es Como Una Flor"	Rudy La Scala
2	"Tengo Todo Excepto a Tí"	Luis Miguel
3	"Cómo Fuí a Enamorarme de Tí"	Los Bukis
4	"Quiero Amanecer con Alguien"	Daniela Romo
5	"La Cima del Cielo"	Ricardo Montaner
6	"Quién Como Tú"	Ana Gabriel
7	"Lambada"	Kaoma
8	"Burbujas de Amor"	Juan Luis Guerra & 4.40
9	"Amnesia"	José José
10	"Me Va a Extrañar"	Ricardo Montaner

== Births ==
- January 5 – Darell, Puerto Rican rapper
- January 30 – Eiza González, Mexican actress and singer
- February 17 – María José Quintanilla, Chilean singer
- March 17 – Alice Caymmi, Brazilian singer
- March 29 – Justin Quiles, Colombian reggaeton singer
- July 17 – Naëla, Colombian pop singer
- August 11 – María José Castillo, Costa Rican pop singer
- August 24 – Juan Pedro Lanzani, Argentine pop singer and actor, former member of Teen Angels
- September 25 – Edén Muñoz, Mexican performer of banda music
- October 7 – Dalex, Argentine singer
- October 20 – Melody, Spanish pop singer
- November 29 – Diego Boneta, Mexican singer and actor
- December 28 – Yago Muñoz, Mexican singer and actress

== Deaths ==
- May 16–Eduardo Mateo, Uruguayan singer, songwriter, guitarist and arranger
- July 7–Cazuza, Brazilian singer and songwriter, former member of Barão Vermelho
- October 27–Xavier Cugat, Spanish-American bandleader
- October 28–Gervasio, Uruguayan new wave singer
- December 14–Francisco Gabilondo Soler, Mexican singer and creator of Cri-Cri
