= Historia de Una Reina =

Compilation album by Ana Gabriel
- Released: 2 August 2005 (Mexico)
- Recorded: 2005
- Genre: Pop; Ranchera; Regional
- Label: Sony International

Ana Gabriel Compilations chronology
Personalidad: 20 Éxitos (2002)	Historia de Una Reina (2005)	Canciones de Amor (2006)

Historia de Una Reina (English History of a queen) is a compilation album by the Mexican pop singer, Ana Gabriel. It was released in 2005. It was nominated to Latin Greatest Hits Album Of The Year in the Latin Billboard Music Awards of 2006, but lost to Marco Antonio Solís La Historia Continúa... Parte II.

== Track listing ==
Tracks:

1. Quién Como Tú – 03:35
2. Simplemente Amigos – 03:49
3. Es el Amor Quien Llega – 03:50
4. Es Demasiado Tarde – 04:14
5. Pecado Original – 03:29
6. Evidencias – 04:15
7. Ahora – 03:24
8. Cosas del Amor – 04:20
9. En la Oscuridad – 03:59
10. Un Viejo Amor – 03:19
11. Ay Amor – 03:25
12. Con un Mismo Corazón – 03:38
13. Luna – 04:33
14. La Reina – 03:36
15. Huelo a Soledad – 04:21
16. Mi Gusto Es – 02:53

== Album charts ==
#	Chart	U.S. Peak Position
1.	"Latin Pop Albums"	#3
2.	"Top Lat. Albums"	#5
3.	"Top Heatseekers"	#8
4.	"Heatseekers (Pacific)"	#2
5.	"Heatseekers (Mountain)"	#1
6.	"Heatseekers (South Central)"	#1
7.	"Heatseekers (South Atlantic)"	#1
8.	"Billboard 200"	#173

- Note: This release reached the #3 position in Billboard Latin Pop Albums staying for 70 weeks and it reached the #5 position in the Billboard Top Latin Albums staying for 33 weeks in the chart. This was also her first entry ever to the Billboard 200.
