= Pero Me Acuerdo de Ti =

2000 single by Christina Aguilera

Song by Lourdes Robles

from the album Definitivamente
- Language: Spanish
- Released: 1991
- Genre: Latin pop
- Length: 5:07
- Label: CBS Discos
- Songwriter: Rudy Pérez
- Producer: Rudy Pérez

Audio video
- "Pero Me Acuerdo de Ti" on YouTube

"Pero Me Acuerdo de Ti" (English: "But I Remember You") is a song written and produced by Rudy Pérez. It was first recorded by Puerto Rican singer Lourdes Robles on her album Definitivamente (1991). In the ballad, the singer remembers her lover even when she tries to forget. Nine years later, American recording artist Christina Aguilera included a cover version on her second studio album Mi Reflejo which Pérez also produced. It was released as the second single from the album in December 2000. The music video for Aguilera's version was directed by Kevin Bray.

Aguilera performed the song live at the 2001 Grammy Awards. Her version peaked at number eight on the Billboard Hot Latin Songs chart in the United States and number three in Spain. It received a Latin Grammy nomination for Record of the Year. It has been covered by Mexican singer Edith Márquez and Jencarlos Canela.

== Background ==
In 1991, Puerto Rican recording artist Lourdes Robles released her third studio album Definitivamente which was arranged and produced by Cuban-American musician Rudy Pérez. Pérez wrote three songs for the album including "Pero Me Acuerdo de Ti". The song tells the story of a woman who cannot forget her lover. It was later included on Robles's greatest hits album Contradicciones y Sus Exitos (2007). In 2000, American recording artist Christina Aguilera covered "Pero Me Acuerdo de Ti" on her second studio album Mi Reflejo which was also produced by Pérez.

== Christina Aguilera version ==
"Pero Me Acuerdo de Ti"

Single by Christina Aguilera

from the album Mi Reflejo
- B-side: "Ven Conmigo (Solamente Tu)"
- Released: December 12, 2000
- Genre: Latin pop
- Length: 4:26
- Label: RCA
- Songwriter: Rudy Pérez
- Producer: Rudy Pérez

Christina Aguilera singles chronology
"Come on Over Baby (All I Want Is You)" (2000)	"Pero Me Acuerdo de Ti" (2000)	"Nobody Wants to Be Lonely" (2001)

Audio sample
- "Pero Me Acuerdo de Ti" is a Latin pop song which was written and produced by Rudy Pérez: file; help

Music video
- "Pero Me Acuerdo de Ti" on YouTube

=== Release and reception ===
"Pero Me Acuerdo de Ti" was serviced to Latin radio stations the second week of December 2000 in the United States. It reached number eight on Hot Latin Songs and five on Hot Latin Pop Songs in the US. In Spain, it reached number three on the country's singles chart. Kurt B. Reighley from Wall of Sound was positive toward the song, saying that Aguilera is "persuasive and engaging" on the song. Orlando Sentinel editor Perry Gettelman was not impressed, writing that "She seems equally fond of acrobatic trills and low, sex-kittenish moans". Writing for the Billboard magazine, Lucas Villa provided a supporting commentary and called the ballad "heartbreaking". At the 2nd Latin Grammy Awards, "Pero Me Acuerdo de Ti" received a Latin Grammy nomination for Record of the Year which went to Alejandro Sanz for "El Alma al Aire". It has been called "one of Aguilera's greatest hits" by Rolling Stone en Español.

=== Promotion and live performances ===
The video for "Pero Me Acuerdo de Ti" was directed by Kevin G. Bray, which features Aguilera performing the song in a recording studio. As of October 2023, the video has four hundred seventy million views on YouTube, and therefore it was given a Vevo Certified Award. Aguilera also gave a performance at the 2001 Grammy Awards in February, performing "Pero Me Acuerdo de Ti" and "Falsas Esperanzas". Leila Cobo of Billboard magazine called Aguilera's Grammy performance "remarkably mainstream".

In December 2019, Aguilera performed the song, along with "Falsas Esperanzas" and "Contigo en la Distancia", during the Mexican leg of her concert tour, The X Tour. In February 2021, she sang "Pero Me Acuerdo de Ti" at the Verizon's "Big Concert for Small Business" Super Bowl afterparty.

=== Charts ===
==== Weekly charts ====
Chart (2001)	Peak position
Costa Rica (Notimex)	3
Guatemala (Notimex)	3
Italy (FIMI)	44
Nicaragua (Notimex)	4
Spain (Promusicae)	3
Uruguay (IFPI)	1
US Hot Latin Songs (Billboard)	8
US Latin Pop Airplay (Billboard)	5
US Tropical Airplay (Billboard)	7

==== Year-end charts ====
Chart (2001–2022)	Position
Nicaragua Pop (Monitor Latino)	44
US Latin Pop Airplay (Billboard)	30

=== Certifications ===
Certifications for Pero Me Acuerdo de Ti
Region	Certification	Certified units/sales
Mexico (AMPROFON)	4× Platinum	240,000^{‡}
^{‡} Sales+streaming figures based on certification alone.

=== Release history ===
Release dates and formats for "Pero Me Acuerdo de Ti"
Region	Date	Format(s)	Label(s)	Ref.
United States	December 12, 2000	Latin pop radio	RCA	
Sweden	April 2, 2001	Contemporary hit radio	BMG	

== Other cover versions ==
Mexican singer and actress Edith Márquez performed a cover of the song on her studio album Pasiones de Cabaret (2008). In the same year, America band Dark Latin Groove performed a salsa cover of the song on their album Renacer (2008) which was produced by Sergio George. It was also performed live by American actor and singer Jencarlos Canela (whom Pérez has also worked with) in the House of Blues, Orlando.
