= Competencia Es Ninguna =

Studio album by Carlos Mojica
- Released: June 1, 2015
- Recorded: 2012–2015
- Genre: Salsa
- Label: Criminal Sound Productions
- Producer: Carlos Mojica; David Gonzalez

Carlos Mojica chronology
Crime Payz (2010)	Competencia Es Ninguna (2015)

Singles from Competencia Es Ninguna
- 1. "Como Un Tatuaje" Released: 2012; 2. "Competencia Es Ninguna" Released: 2013

Competencia Es Ninguna is the second studio album by American singer-songwriter Carlos Mojica. It was released on June 1, 2015, by Criminal Sound Productions.

== Track listing ==
No.	Title	Writer(s)	Length
1.	"Intro (Frankie Ruiz prelude)"	Frankie Ruiz	0:53
2.	"Competencia Es Ninguna"	Pedro Diaz, Carlos Mojica	5:33
3.	"Como un Tatuaje"	Pedro Diaz, Carlos Mojica	4:42
4.	"Just the 2 of Us"	Bill Withers, Ralph MacDonald, William Salter	5:27
5.	"Hijo Mio"	Pedro Diaz, Carlos Mojica	5:10
6.	"Vicio"	Pedro Diaz, Carlos Mojica	4:42
7.	"Atraccion Fatal"	Pedro Diaz, Carlos Mojica	5:37
8.	"Engañada"	Ray Santo	4:33
9.	"Los Violentos"	Louie Ramirez	5:14
10.	"Puro y Sin Corte"	Carlos Mojica	6:24
