= 40 y 20 =

40 y 20 may refer to:

- 40 y 20 (album), a 1992 album by José José
- 40 y 20 (TV series), a Mexican comedy television series
