= List of number-one Billboard Hot Latin Tracks of 1990 =

This is a list containing the Billboard Hot Latin Tracks number-ones of 1990.

Issue date	Song	Artist(s)	Ref.
January 6	"La Chica de Humo"	Emmanuel	
January 13	"Cómo Fuí a Enamorarme de Tí"	Los Bukis	
January 20	"Cómo Fuí a Enamorarme de Tí"	Los Bukis	
January 27	"La Cima del Cielo"	Ricardo Montaner	
February 3	"La Cima del Cielo"	Ricardo Montaner	
February 10	"Lambada"	Kaoma	
February 17	"Lambada"	Kaoma	
February 24	"Lambada"	Kaoma	
March 3	"Lambada"	Kaoma	
March 10	"Lambada"	Kaoma	
March 17	"Lambada"	Kaoma	
March 24	"Lambada"	Kaoma	
March 31	"Abre las Ventanas al Amor"	Roberto Carlos	
April 7	"Abre las Ventanas al Amor"	Roberto Carlos	
April 14	"Abre las Ventanas al Amor"	Roberto Carlos	
April 21	"Volare"	Gipsy Kings	
April 28	"Volare"	Gipsy Kings	
May 5	"Quién Como Tú"	Ana Gabriel	
May 12	"Quién Como Tú"	Ana Gabriel	
May 19	"Quién Como Tú"	Ana Gabriel	
May 26	"Quién Como Tú"	Ana Gabriel	
June 2	"Quién Como Tú"	Ana Gabriel	
June 9	"Quién Como Tú"	Ana Gabriel	
June 16	"Quién Como Tú"	Ana Gabriel	
June 23	"El Cariño Es Como Una Flor"	Rudy La Scala	
June 30	"El Cariño Es Como Una Flor"	Rudy La Scala	
July 7	"El Cariño Es Como Una Flor"	Rudy La Scala	
July 14	"El Cariño Es Como Una Flor"	Rudy La Scala	
July 21	"Tengo Todo Excepto a Tí"	Luis Miguel	
July 28	"Tengo Todo Excepto a Tí"	Luis Miguel	
August 4	"Tengo Todo Excepto a Tí"	Luis Miguel	
August 11	"Tengo Todo Excepto a Tí"	Luis Miguel	
August 18	"Tengo Todo Excepto a Tí"	Luis Miguel	
August 25	"Tengo Todo Excepto a Tí"	Luis Miguel	
September 1	"Tengo Todo Excepto a Tí"	Luis Miguel	
September 8	"Tengo Todo Excepto a Tí"	Luis Miguel	
September 15	"¿Por Qué Te Tengo Que Olvidar?"	José Feliciano	
September 22	"¿Por Qué Te Tengo Que Olvidar?"	José Feliciano	
September 29	"Amnesia"	José José	
October 6	"Peligroso Amor"	Myriam Hernández	
October 13	"Peligroso Amor"	Myriam Hernández	
October 20	"Completamente Enamorados"	Chayanne	
October 27	"Completamente Enamorados"	Chayanne	
November 3	"Completamente Enamorados"	Chayanne	
November 10	"Completamente Enamorados"	Chayanne	
November 17	"Completamente Enamorados"	Chayanne	
November 24	"Entrégate"	Luis Miguel	
December 1	"Abrázame Fuerte"	Lourdes Robles	
December 8	"Es Demasiado Tarde"	Ana Gabriel	
December 15	"Es Demasiado Tarde"	Ana Gabriel	
December 22	"Es Demasiado Tarde"	Ana Gabriel	
December 29	"Es Demasiado Tarde"	Ana Gabriel	
