= Por Qué Será (song) =

Single by Rudy La Scala

from the album Por Qué Será
- Released: 1991
- Recorded: 1990–1991
- Studio: Audio Uno (Caracas, Venezuela)
- Genre: Latin pop
- Length: 4:35
- Label: Sonotone
- Songwriter: Rudy La Scala
- Producer: Rudy La Scala

Rudy La Scala singles chronology
"Vamos a Enamorarnos" (1991)	"Por Qué Será" (1991)	"Me Cambiaste la Vida" (1992)

"Por Qué Será" ("Why Will That Be?") is a song written, produced, and performed by Italo-Venezuelan singer-songwriter Rudy La Scala. It was released as the lead single from Scala's fifth studio album of the same title (1991), and became his second No. 1 single in the Billboard Top Latin Songs chart following "El Cariño Es Como Una Flor" the previous year.

The song debuted in the Billboard Top Latin Songs chart (formerly Hot Latin Tracks) chart at No. 22 in the week of September 14, 1991, climbing to the top ten four weeks later. "Por Qué Será" peaked at No. 1 on November 9, 1991, replacing "Cosas del Amor" by American singer Vikki Carr and Mexican singer-songwriter Ana Gabriel and being succeeded two weeks later by "Amor Mío, ¿Qué Me Has Hecho?" by Spanish singer-songwriter Camilo Sesto.

== See also ==
- Billboard Top Latin Songs Year-End Chart
- List of number-one Billboard Hot Latin Tracks of 1991
