= Quién Como Tú (song) =

Single by Ana Gabriel

from the album Quién como tú
- Released: January 29, 1990
- Recorded: 1989
- Genre: Latin pop · Latin ballad
- Length: 3:34
- Label: Discos CBS International
- Songwriter: Ana Gabriel
- Producer: Óscar Gómez

Ana Gabriel singles chronology
"Hice Bien Quererte" (1989)	"Quién Como Tú" (1990)	"Ni Un Roce (Nem Um Toque)" (1990)

"Quién Como Tú" (English: Who Like You) is a ballad and title track written and performed by Mexican singer-songwriter Ana Gabriel. It was produced by Óscar Gómez for Gabriel's fifth studio album Quién como tú (1989). Released as the second single from the album, the song became the third number-one single for the singer in the Billboard Top Latin Songs chart in May of the same year. Live performances of the song can be found on the albums En Vivo (1990) and ...En la Plaza de Toros México (1998).

It also has been included on several compilation albums released by Gabriel, including Personalidad (1992), Una Voz Para tu Corazón – 30 Grandes Éxitos (2000), Historia de Una Reina (2005), Lo Esencial de Ana Gabriel (2009) and Mis Favoritas (2010). It is recognized as one of Ana Gabriel's signature songs.

The song debuted on the Billboard Top Latin Songs chart (formerly Hot Latin Tracks) at number 33 on April 7, 1990 and rose to the top ten the following week, climbing 28 spots. It reached the top position of the chart on May 5, 1990, replacing French band Gipsy Kings' "Volaré" and being succeeded by "El Cariño Es Como Una Flor" by Rudy La Scala. It ranked sixth at the year-end chart of 1990 and was nominated for Pop Song of the Year at the 1991 Lo Nuestro Awards, which it lost to "Es Demasiado Tarde", also written and performed by Gabriel. The song spent 22 weeks within the Top 40 and became the sixth top ten single for the singer in the chart, and third number-one hit, after "Ay Amor" (1987) and "Simplemente Amigos" (1988). The parent album peaked at the top of the Billboard Latin Pop Albums chart.

"Quién Como Tú" has been covered by several performers, including Patricia Manterola, José Alberto "El Canario", Oscar Alberto, Los Flamers, Grupo Caneo, Grupo Innovación, Hermanos Moreno, Original Banda el Limón, Yolanda Pérez, Son De Azúcar, Sonora Tropicana, Myriam and Noel Schajris. In 2015, Mexican singer Lucero released a version of the track as the lead single from the album Aquí Estoy, a tribute to Ana Gabriel. For the single release, Lucero re-recorded the track with Puerto Rican-American singer-songwriter Luis Fonsi and debuted the song at the reality show Yo Soy el Artista. This version peaked at number 32 in the Billboard Mexican Espanol Airplay chart.

== Certifications ==
Region	Certification	Certified units/sales
Mexico (AMPROFON)	Diamond+3× Platinum	480,000^{‡}
^{‡} Sales+streaming figures based on certification alone.

== See also ==
- List of number-one Billboard Hot Latin Tracks of 1990
