= Yordano =

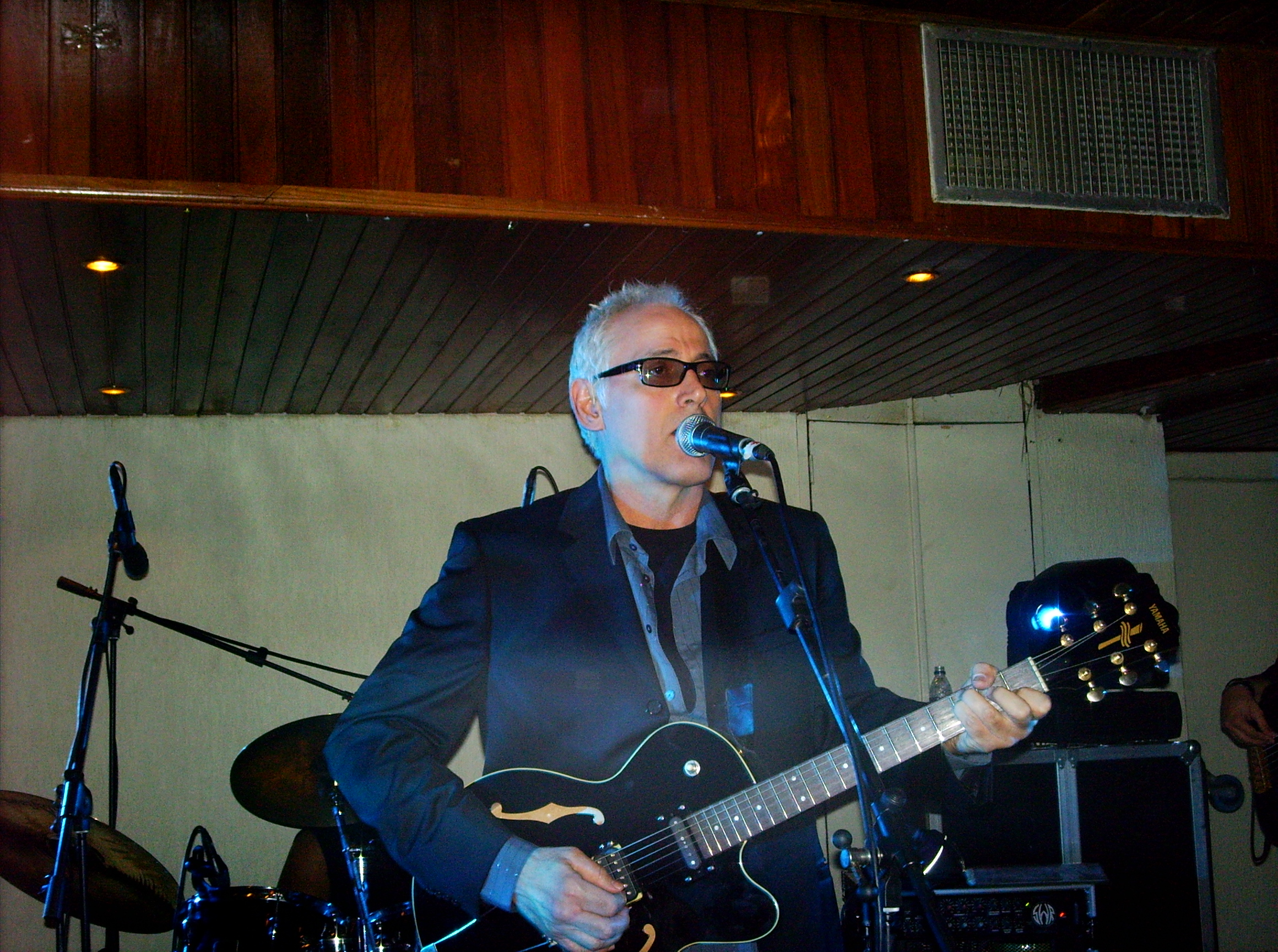

Background information
- Born: Giordano Di Marzo Migani; October 27, 1951 (age 74); Rome, Italy
- Genres: Pop music
- Occupation(s): Singer-songwriter, guitar player
- Labels: Polydor; PolyGram; Rodven; Sonográfica; Sony Music; Velvet
- Website: www.last.fm/music/Yordano

Yordano, born Giordano Di Marzo Migani, is an Italian–born Venezuelan singer-songwriter and guitar player.

== Early life ==
Born on October 27, 1951, in Rome, Italy, Yordano moved with his parents to Caracas at an early age (11) and was educated in the common schools there. He then graduated as an architect from Central University of Venezuela, where he participated in musical events and other endeavors. While attending the university, he became known as a prolific songwriter. Yordano lengthened his stride as he formed original bands to showcase his music.

== Professional career ==
But it was not until 1978 when Yordano decides to undertake a musical career, when he performed as vocalist and guitarist of the group Sietecuero with his brother the singer Evio di Marzo, which recorded an album in Puerto Rico. In 1982, he released his first solo album Negocios son Negocios on Polygram. Two years later, he followed with his second album, Yordano, which brought him some public recognition. He then moved to Sonográfica in 1986.

His breakout year came in 1992, when his song Por estas calles (On These Streets), included in the album De Sol a Sol, was used as the opening theme for the telenovela with the same title. It was broadcast by Radio Caracas Televisión through 627 episodes between 1992 and 1994 and was very popular in Venezuela. As a result, De Sol a Sol topped the country and pop album charts for more than two years, which led Yordano to achieve celebrity status in his homeland.

After that, Yordano released many solid but unspectacular albums and made guest appearances on records by some of Venezuela's top artists, including Ilan Chester and Simón Díaz.

In between, Yordano toured Colombia, Chile, Dominican Republic, Ecuador, Mexico, Miami, Panama, Puerto Rico, Spain and Texas.

== Late years ==
In August 2014, Yordano was diagnosed with myelodysplastic syndrome (MDS). He was operated successfully in January 2015 in the City of New York, and followed the treatment schedule with all backup investigational and medical supportive services.

== Selected discography ==
=== As soloist ===
Year	Album	Label	Ref
1982	Negocios son Negocios	Polygram	
1984	Yordano	Polydor	
1986	Jugando Conmigo	Sonográfica	
1988	Lunas	Sonográfica	
1990	Finales de Siglo	Sonográfica	
1992	De Sol a Sol	Sonográfica	
1995	Sabor de Cayena	Sony Music	
1997	Fiebre	Sony Music	
1998	Noches de Luna/Yordano en Concierto	Airo Music (Double CD)	
2000	¡Qué Lindas Son!	Perla Negra/Recordland	
2002	Secretos de la noche	Perla Negra/Latin World	
2003	La Historia – 20 Años de Exitos en Concierto	Latin World	
2007	El Deseo	Independent	
2011	Yordano hoy – En Vivo	Independent (Double CD)	
2013	Sueños clandestinos	Independent	
2014	Manifiesto	Independent EP	
2016	El Tren de los Regresos	Sony Music	
2020	Despues de Todo	Sony Music	

=== As guest vocalist ===
Year	Album	Artist	Label	Ref
1978	Rojo Sangre	Sietecuero	Velvet	
1983	Daiquirí	Daiquirí	Sonográfica	
1986	A flor de piel	Luz Marina	Sonográfica	
1986	Tercera Etapa	Guaco	Sonográfica	
1989	Betania	Guaco	Sonográfica	
1993	Vuelve	Colina	Sonográfica	
1998	Duetos	Simón Díaz	Rodven/Polygram	
2008	Pasajeros en tránsito	Roque Valero	ICRecords	
2009	Tesoros de la Música Venezolana	Ilan Chester	Independent	
