= Guachinche =

Type of restaurant on the Canary Islands

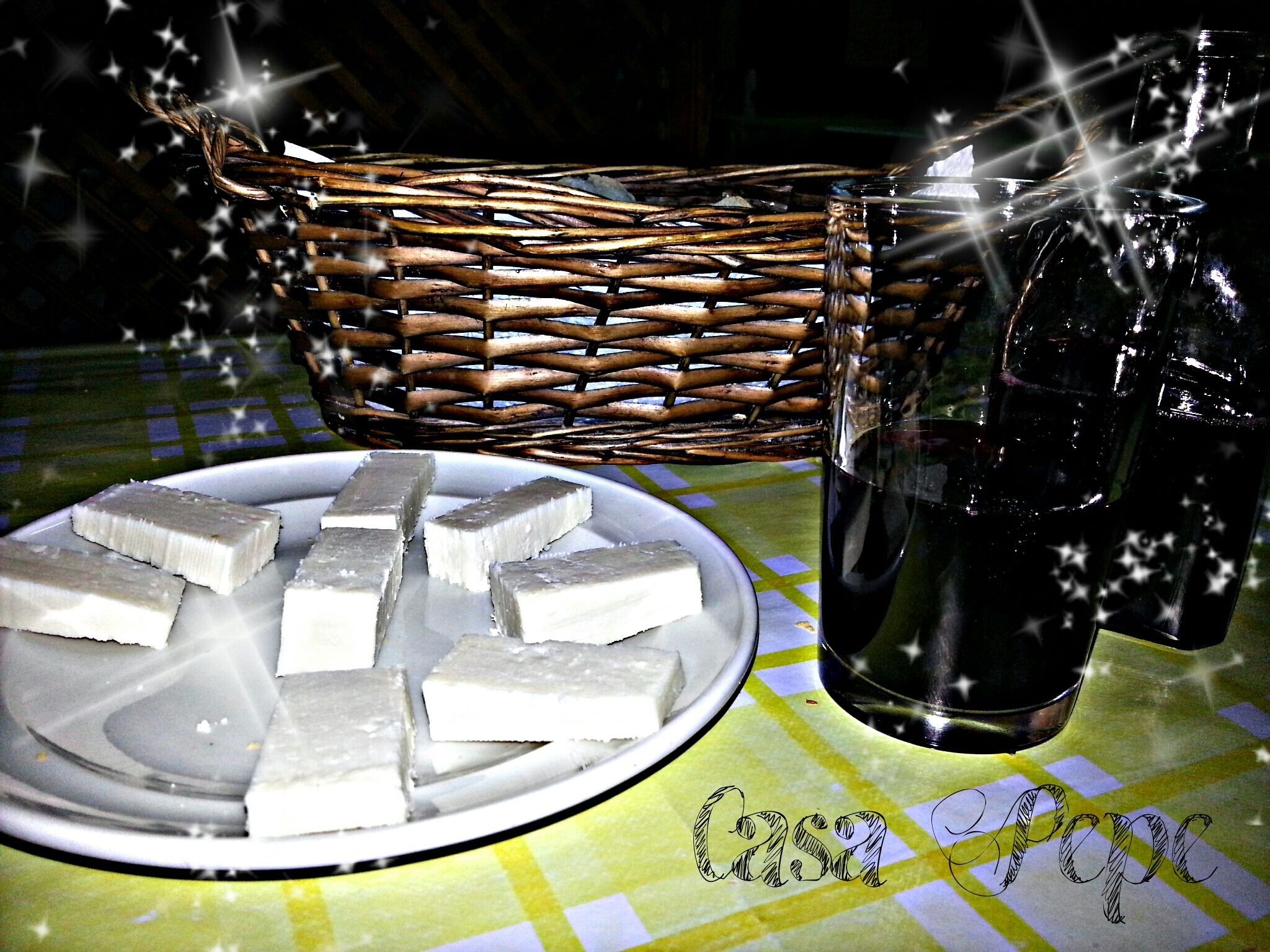

A guachinche is a typical Canary Island establishment, more widely spread on the island of Tenerife and to a lesser extent in Gran Canaria, where a locally produced wine is served accompanied by homemade traditional food.

== History ==
The origins of guachinches lie in the wine-tasting parties that the local wine growers organized at certain dates of the year to sell their products (in particular the famous malvasia wine) directly to the British buyers and later to the local consumers, to avoid having to deal with intermediaries, as a song "Polca Frutera" by Los Sabandeños says. The guachinches are usually situated next to important wine regions of the Island of Tenerife: especially in the northern municipalities, such as Tacoronte, El Sauzal, Tegueste, La Matanza de Acentejo, La Victoria de Acentejo, Santa Úrsula, La Orotava and Los Realejos. A few of them can also be found in the Güímar Valley (that is in Arafo, Candelaria and Güímar municipalities) .

== Etymology ==
The word “bochinche”, mainly used in Gran Canaria, and its variant “guachinche”, more typical of Tenerife, is used in the Canary dialect of Spanish to refer to a popular establishment where local wine and typical foods are served. According to the historical-etymological dictionary of Canary dialect, by Marcial Morera, it derived from the Latin American Spanish word “bochinche” (derived from “buche” – “sip, gulp”), which means 'a poor tavern'. The other version claims that the word "guachinche" comes from the English expression "I'm watching you!", apparently used by the British buyers to indicate that they were ready to try the local products and the Canary farmers understood the phrase as "Is there a guachinche?", that is if there was a party nearby (or a stand or shop) set up to taste the wine before finally making the purchase.

== Features ==
Long before the Canary wines received their first Appellation of Origin (this was the region of Tacoronte-Acentejo), the guachinches were mounted in a room or a garage in the family house, where the wife of the winemaker offered some tapas made in the family kitchen to accompany the home-made wine.

The guachinche's clients don’t look for an exquisite service or commodities, they value above all the unique local wines and a familiar and traditional cuisine: rich homemade stews, such as chickpeas with smoked meats (garbanzas), rabbit in spicy salmorejo sause, pork ribs with potatoes and corn on the cob, stuffed courgettes (bubangos), potatoes with mojo sause, carne fiesta (fried marinated pork and potatoes), carne de cabra (goat’s meat), churros de pescado (local battered fish), etc. For dessert you can taste the baked milk flan or a typical local dessert called bienmesabe, or you can also enjoy the locally grown fruits like mango, bananas, etc. In essence, the guachinches have emerged as an offshoot of wine production activity, and not as proper restaurants or food establishments. For this reason, they have never been regulated and guachinche owners didn’t pay any taxes for this activity, although over the time many winemakers and their families became restaurateurs on a professional basis. So with the time along with legal guachinches plenty of clandestine establishments started to appear which served cheap wine from Latin America as their own and actually functioned as restaurants but without the obligations to comply with the fiscal and health requirements applicable to restaurants. In recent years, legal restaurants and bars have complained heavily about the unfair competition from guachinches, since those attracted customers by ridiculously low prices and a wide range of dishes on the menu. So in 2013, the Canary government has issued a decree 83/2013 regulating the guachinche activity as a complementary tourist activity aimed at a preservation of local traditions and the natural rural environment and introducing a number of rules that limit the food and beverages that can be served at a guachinche and define its operating conditions. These rules include, but are not limited to, the following:

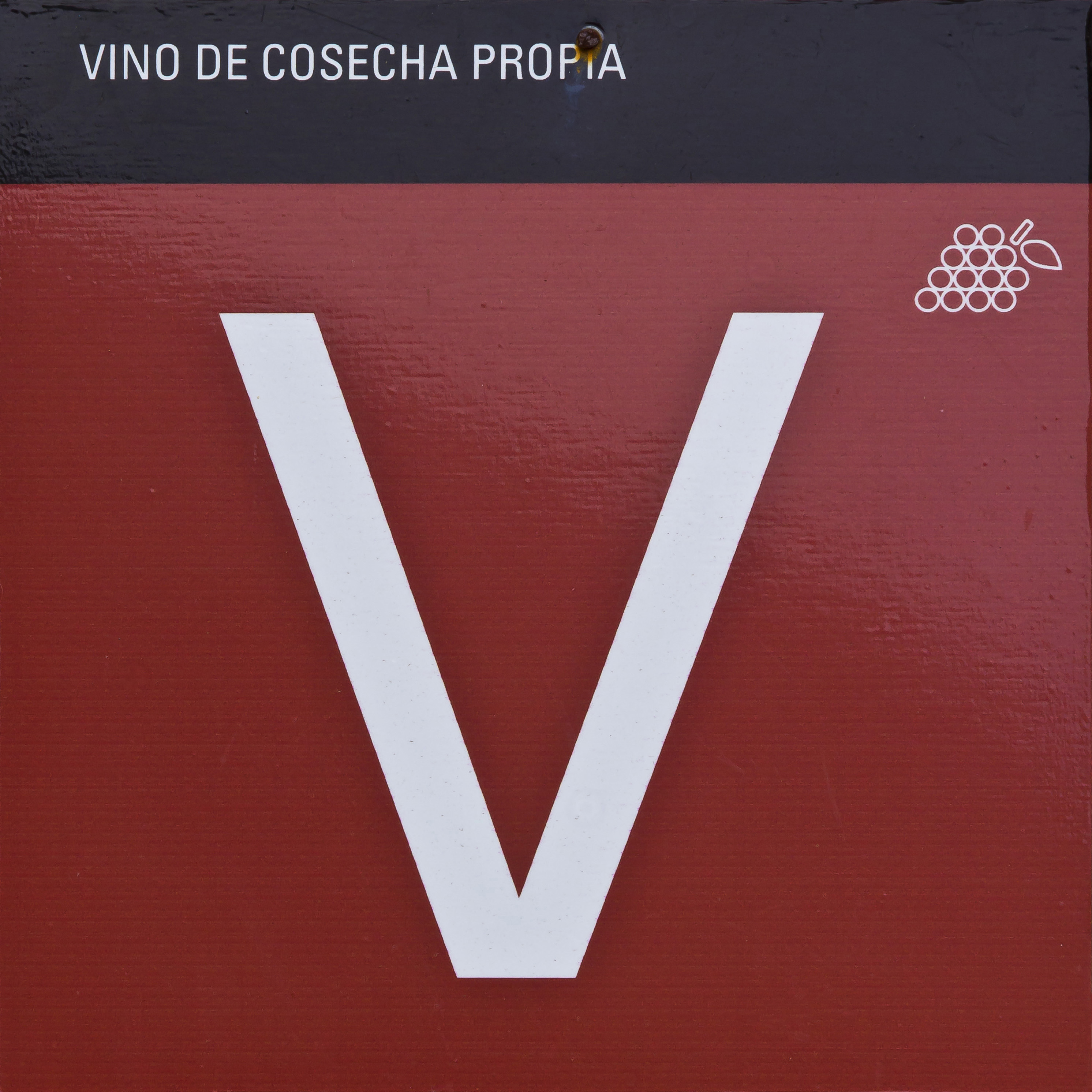
a distinctive guachinche plaque

1. The wine to be marketed must come from vineyards belonging to or exploited by the person who runs the activity and must be of own production; the winery must be duly registered in the Register of Agrarian Industries and in the Register of wine producers.
2. The person who runs the activity must accredit the origin of the wine through the harvest and production declarations that must be presented in accordance with European regulations.
3. The personnel of the establishment must be certified for sanitary food manipulation training according to the applicable specific regulations.
4. The wine marketed in the establishment must meet the safety and quality characteristics of this type of product according to the applicable legislation.
5. The opening period of the establishment must not exceed four months a year; in any case, ceasing the activity from the moment the home-grown wine is depleted.
6. A maximum of three different culinary dishes can be offered and served, as well as pickles, nuts and fruit grown by the owner of the activity or produced in the area. The food must be made mainly with ingredients also grown or produced by the owner of the activity or with local products or rooted in the local culinary tradition. The supply of beverages shall be limited to home-grown wine and water.
7. The owner must inform customers of the prices of products offered through a listing placed in the exterior and interior of the establishment and invoice the services in accordance with the prices of that listing.
8. The owner must inform customers of the opening period of the establishment and of the days and hours of operation, by placing an information poster at the entrance.
9. The owner must display the distinctive plaque at the entrance (in the photo).

== Curiosities ==
- Traditional guachinche opening day is the day of St. Andres, 30 November, otherwise called the young wine festival. The wine of the new harvest is traditionally served with roasted chestnuts, maturing at the same time, and grilled sardines. Most guachinches open on that day and close when all their wine is sold out. For this reason, a guachinche season normally lasts from late autumn till early spring, as with the onset of summer they would have either run out of wine or would be obliged to comply with the maximum permitted opening time.
- Canarian residents love their guachinches so much that they have traditional "guachinche routes» (rutas de guachinches), when in a single day they visit several places at once. To avoid getting lost on the way, they even created a special mobile application called Guachapp.
- Despite the fact that guachinches represent the cultural heritage of Tenerife, the word «guachinche» cannot be legally used by Canarians. In 2009 it was registered as a trademark by an individual, and since then the Canary Islands government is trying to challenge the registration, and in parallel to register the expression «guachinches de Tenerife», so that the legal establishments of this category can use it in their business names
- Most guachinches do not accept credit cards.
