= Carlos Mojica =

American singer-songwriter

- Also known as: "El Criminal de la Salsa" ("The Criminal of Salsa")
- Born: Carlos Mojica; January 19, 1975 (age 51); Paterson, New Jersey, U.S.
- Genres: Salsa
- Occupation: Singer-Songwriter
- Years active: 1990–present
- Website: Official website

Carlos Mojica (born January 19, 1975) is an American singer-songwriter and musical arranger.

== Early life ==
Carlos Mojica was born in Paterson, New Jersey to Puerto Rican parents. By the age of 15, Mojica and his family had moved to Orlando, Florida and he began singing in numerous local salsa bands.

== Career ==
Mojica began his career in 1990 by collaborating with local bands in Orlando, Florida, and sharing the stage with various artists including Ismael Miranda, Tito Puente Jr., Brenda K. Starr, and Lalo Rodriguez among others.

In 2007, Mojica went solo, forming his band "Sonido Criminal" and touring extensively throughout the U.S. and Latin America. In 2010, Mojica launched his own record label and released his first album Crime Payz, an album that was selected as a Top Ten album by the Latin Beat Magazine in 2011. Mojica later released his second album Competencia Es Ninguna in 2015, which features a prelude track with the voice of Frankie Ruiz .

== Personal life ==
Mojica currently resides in Windermere, Florida, with his wife Delilah Mojica, and their son Tino.

In 1992, Mojica was arrested and sentenced to four years in prison. Mojica stated in a 2016 interview that his experience in jail had helped him turn his life around and he began focusing more on his career as a musician upon his release at age 21.

== Discography ==
- 2010: Crime Payz
- 2015: Competencia Es Ninguna
