= Definitivamente =

Definitivamente may refer to:

- Definitivamente (album), a 1991 album by Lourdes Robles
- Definitivamente (song), a song by Daddy Yankee and Sech
