= En las buenas y en las malas =

En las buenas y en las malas may refer to:

- En las Buenas... y en las Malas, 1990 album by Mexican singer José José
- En las buenas y en las malas (film), 2019 Mexican film
