= Crime Payz =

Studio album by Carlos Mojica
- Released: December 27, 2010
- Recorded: 2010
- Genre: Salsa
- Length: 43:06
- Label: Criminal Sound Productions
- Producer: Carlos Mojica

Carlos Mojica chronology
Crime Payz (2010)	Competencia Es Ninguna (2015)

Singles from Crime Payz
- 1. "Facebook" Released: 2010

Crime Payz is the debut studio album by American singer-songwriter Carlos Mojica. It was released on December 27, 2010, by Criminal Sound Productions. The album was selected as a Top Ten album by the Latin Beat Magazine in 2011.

== Track listing ==
No.	Title	Writer(s)	Length
1.	"Intro"	Carlos Mojica	1:40
2.	"Urgente Olvidarte"	Carlos Mojica	4:20
3.	"Careless Whisper"	George Michael, Andrew Ridgeley	4:09
4.	"Rumba en El Cielo"	Carlos Mojica	4:49
5.	"Puro y Sin Corte"	Carlos Mojica	5:44
6.	"Cuando Te Conoci"	Carlos Mojica	4:57
7.	"Sandunguera"	Carlos Mojica	4:15
8.	"Facebook"	Pedro Jesus Diaz, Carlos Mojica	4:33
9.	"Borinquen"	Charlie Lopez	5:00
10.	"Crime Payz"	Pedro Jesus Diaz, Carlos Mojica	4:49
