= En las Buenas... y en las Malas =

Studio album by José José
- Released: June 12, 1990
- Recorded: 1989–1990
- Genre: Latin pop
- Length: 43:16
- Label: RCA
- Producer: Daniel Freiberg, Oscar Lopez

José José chronology
| ¿Qué es el Amor? (1989) | En las Buenas... y en las Malas (1990) | 40 y 20 (1992) |

En las Buenas y en las Malas (In Good and Bad Times) is the title of the 27th studio album released by Mexican performer José José on June 12, 1990. It was produced by Daniel Freiberg and Oscar Lopez. The album included the number-one single "Amnesia", and the hits "Atrapado" and "Un hotel en vez de corazón".

José José ventures for the first time into the "Salsa" genre with the song " Escuchando Ofertas ".

== Track listing ==
This information adapted from Allmusic.

| No. | Title | Writer(s) | Length |
|---|---|---|---|
| 1. | "Amnesia" | Chico Novaro, Dino Ramos | 3:45 |
| 2. | "Unos Quitan Otros Dan" | Carlos Nilson, Adrián Posse | 3:07 |
| 3. | "Pequeñas Grandes Cosas" | Chico Novaro | 3:58 |
| 4. | "Un Hotel en Vez de Corazón" | Gil Rivera | 3:11 |
| 5. | "Atrapado" | Rubén Amado | 4:11 |
| 6. | "Hay Un Mañana (duet with Valeria Lynch)" | Marcelo Alejandro, Valeria Lynch | 4:01 |
| 7. | "Ni Me lo Digas" | Las Diego | 4:13 |
| 8. | "Escuchando Ofertas" | Novaro | 3:50 |
| 9. | "Esa Mujer" | Jorge Luis Piloto | 4:15 |
| 10. | "Caso Común y Corriente" | Lolita de la Colina | 4:11 |
| 11. | "Uno Mismo" | Titti Sotto | 4:42 |

== Chart performance ==
| Chart (1990) | Peak position |
|---|---|
| US Billboard Latin Pop Albums | 9 |
