= Definitivamente (album) =

Studio album by Lourdes Robles
- Released: 1991
- Genre: Latin pop
- Label: CBS
- Producer: Rudy Pérez

Lourdes Robles chronology
Imágenes (1990)	Definitivamente (1991)	Amaneciendo en Ti (1993)

Definitivamente (Definitively), is the title of the third studio album released by Puerto-Rican singer Lourdes Robles in 1991. The album at number ten in the Billboard Latin Pop Albums chart. The album produced three singles: "Sola", "Todo Me Habla de Ti", and "Soñando Contigo". "Sola" peaked at #8 on the Billboard Hot Latin Songs chart, "Todo Me Habla de Ti" peaked at #15 on the Hot Latin Songs chart, and "Soñando Contigo" peaked at #23 on the Hot Latin Songs chart.

Definitivamente was produced by Rudy Pérez and Angel Carrasco and features songs written by both producers, Franco de Vita, Jorge Luis Piloto and Braulio García.

== Track listing ==
The information is taken from the album liner notes.

No.	Title	Writer(s)	Length
1.	"Sola"	Jorge Luis Piloto, Rudy Perez	3:50
2.	"A Cara o Cruz"	Rodolfo Castillo, K.C. Porter, Mark Spiro	3:47
3.	"Todo Me Habla de Ti"	Franco de Vita	3:36
4.	"Pero Me Acuerdo de Ti"	Pérez	5:07
5.	"Seré Todo Para Ti"	Babyface, L.A. Reid	5:01
6.	"Definitivamente"	Perez	4:18
7.	"Soñando Contigo"	Jorge Luis Piloto	3:37
8.	"Punto de Partida"	Lourdes Robles	3:47
9.	"Confio en Ti"		3:43
10.	"Concierto Para Dos"	Braulio Garcia	4:36

== Chart performance ==
Chart (1992)	Peak position
US Top Latin Albums (Billboard)	10
