= Adrenalina Caribe =

Venezuelan musical group

Adrenalina Caribe is a Venezuelan music group. Primarily performing Latin and Tropical music, they formed in 1979 in Caracas.

At the peak of Adrenalina Caribe's popularity, the band released several albums under Venezuelan record label Sonográfica in the 1980s. They were led by Evio di Marzo, who went on to perform with a number of guest-musicians under the same name. Originally the band consisted of di Marzo, Alberto Borregales (timpani), Ilan Chester (keyboards) and Sergio Pérez (violin).

In the evening of May 28, 2018, Evio di Marzo was shot by thieves while resisting being stolen his car in downtown Caracas, Venezuela. Di Marzo was transported to Pérez Carreño Hospital in the same city, where he was pronounced dead on arrival.

== Members ==
- Evio di Marzo (†) – vocals, guitar, drums, keyboards
- Carlos Pucci – bass, vocals
- Orlando Poleo – percussion
- Jesús Manzanares – percussion
- Alberto Borregales – percussion
- Néstor Pérez (†) – percussion
- Eleazar Yanes (†) – drummer
- Gerardo López – drummer
- Gustavo Aranguren – trumpet
- Rodolfo Reyes – sax tenor
- Roldán Peña – electric guitar
- Roberto Jirón – electric guitar
- Alfredo Villamizar – percussion
- Glen Tomassi – sax tenor
- William Cabrera – piano & keyboards
- Jesús Enrique González Keyboards & composer.

== Discography ==
- Pico y Pala (Discomoda, 1982)
- Adrenalina Caribe (Sonográfica, 1985)
- Evio di Marzo (Sonográfica, 1987)
- Bio Bio (Sonográfica, 1990)
