= Abrázame Fuerte =

1990 single performed by Lourdes Robles

Single by Lourdes Robles

from the album Imágenes
- Released: 1990
- Genre: Latin
- Length: 4:18
- Label: CBS Discos
- Songwriter: Jorge Luis Piloto
- Producer: Rudy Pérez

Lourdes Robles singles chronology
"Gracias a Tu Amor" (1990)	"Abrázame Fuerte" (1990)	"Miedo" (1991)

"Abrázame Fuerte" (English: Hold Me Tight) is a ballad written by Jorge Luis Piloto, produced by Rudy Pérez and performed by Puerto Rican-American singer Lourdes Robles. The song was released as the second single from Robles' second studio album Imágenes (1990) and became her first number-one song on the Billboard Top Latin Songs chart in the United States and her biggest hit.

The song debuted in the Billboard Top Latin Songs chart (formerly Hot Latin Tracks) chart at number 20 in the week of September 29, 1990, climbing to the top ten three weeks later. "Abrázame Fuerte" peaked at number-one on December 1, 1990, replacing "Entrégate" by Mexican performer Luis Miguel and being succeeded by "Es Demasiado Tarde" by Mexican singer-songwriter Ana Gabriel the following week.

== Il Divo cover ==
"Abrázame fuerte"

Single by Il Divo

from the album Amor & Pasión
- Released: November 2015
- Recorded: 2015, México
- Genre: Classical crossover
- Label: Sony Music, Syco Music and Columbia Records.
- Songwriter: Jorge Luis Piloto
- Producer: Julio Reyes Copello

- Il Divo, the vocal quartet of male singers; Swiss tenor Urs Buhler, Spanish baritone Carlos Marin, American tenor David Miller and French pop singer Sébastien Izambard, along with Colombian producer winner of multiple Grammy Latino Julio Reyes Copello, recorded the song for the album Amor & Pasión from Il Divo (2015).

== See also ==
- List of number-one Billboard Hot Latin Tracks of 1990
