= Es Demasiado Tarde =

Single by Ana Gabriel

from the album Personalidad: 20 Éxitos
- Released: 1990
- Genre: Ranchera
- Length: 4:11
- Label: CBS Discos
- Songwriter: Ana Gabriel
- Producer: Homero Patrón

Ana Gabriel singles chronology
"Ni Un Roce" (1990)	"Es Demasiado Tarde" (1990)	"Hasta Que Te Conocí" (1991)

"Es Demasiado Tarde" ("It's Too Late") is a song written and performed by Mexican singer-songwriter Ana Gabriel. It was released in 1990 by CBS Records and first included on the compilation album México, Voz y Sentimiento which also featured songs performed by Luis Angel, Vikki Carr, Aida Cuevas, Lorenzo de Monteclaro, Antonio De Jesús, Pedro Fernández, Hermanas Huerta, Tania Libertad, Angelica Maria, Lucía Méndez, Angeles Ochoa, Gilberto Parra, Gerardo Reyes, Cuco Sánchez, Cecilia Toussaint, Yuri and Flor Yvon. The song became Gabriel's fourth number-one single in the Billboard Top Latin Songs chart, after "Ay Amor", "Simplemente Amigos" and "Quién Como Tú". Personalidad: 20 Éxitos was the first Gabriel album to include the song. "Es Demasiado Tarde" is a song about a woman who refuses to take her lover back after the end of their relationship. Gabriel also addressed this issue in her song "Tú lo Decidiste" ("You Made the Decision") in 1994. The song earned the Lo Nuestro Award for Best Pop Song.

The song debuted in the Billboard Top Latin Songs chart (formerly Hot Latin Tracks) chart at number 16 in the week of November 3, 1990, climbing to the top ten two weeks later. "Es Demasiado Tarde" peaked at number-one on December 8, 1990, replacing "Abrázame Fuerte" by Puerto Rican American performer Lourdes Robles and being succeeded by "Te Pareces Tanto a Él" by Chilean singer Myriam Hernández 10 weeks later. "Es Demasiado Tarde" ended 1991 as the best performing Latin single of the year in the United States. Los Invasores de Nuevo León, Los Muecas, Myriam, Manoella Torres and Rubén Ramos have also recorded cover versions of the track.

== Certifications ==
Region	Certification	Certified units/sales
Mexico (AMPROFON)	Diamond+Platinum	360,000^{‡}
^{‡} Sales+streaming figures based on certification alone.

== See also ==
- List of number-one Billboard Hot Latin Tracks of 1990
- List of number-one Billboard Hot Latin Tracks of 1991
- Billboard Top Latin Songs Year-End Chart
