= Oscar Santana (singer) =

- Born: Carmelo Óscar Santana Ramírez; 15 November 1941 (age 83); Las Palmas de Gran Canaria,
- Origin: Venezuela
- Occupation: Singer
- Instrument: Voice
- Years active: 1960s - ?
- Labels: Discomoda, Ibersound, Lider, Fonoguanche, AS International, Sonografica, Corona, König Records, Manoca Records, Discan, Dinsa, Suramericana Del Disco, Anes Records

Oscar Santana is a Spanish singer who had good success in the late 1960s with his singles. He has recorded for the Discomoda, Ibersound, AS International, Fonoguanche, Sonografica, Manoca Records and various other record labels.

== Background ==
Oscar Santana (real name Carmelo Óscar Santana Ramírez) was born in Las Palmas de Gran Canaria, on 15 November 1941.

It was in 1957 when he made his way to Venezuela to live with family in Caracas. He started out singing in the US and was later part of the group, Los Melódicos.

Santana had very good success on the Latin Hit Parade charts with his singles, "Honey", "Cierro les Ojos" and "Tu No Sabe Querer".

During the 1980s, he recorded for Fonoguanche, a label that had released recordings for Carlitos Romano, Nina Rojas, Los Sabandeños, Guayaquí 3 and Los Crich etc.

== Career ==
=== 1960s ===
Around 1967, Oscar Santana's album Dime Que Si!.. was released on DISCOMODA DCM-126. It contained the songs, "Tú No Sabes Querer", "Dime Que Si", "La Novia Pobre", "Seré Siempre Para Ti", "Como Te Recuerdo", "Dame Otra Oportunidad", "La Niña Ciega", "El Buen Camino", "Rebeldía", "Brindis", " Pueblito Viejo", and "De Mi Nadie Se Acuerda".

It was reported in the 27 April 1968 issue of Billboard that Santana was recording songs that singer Raphael had previously recorded. Santana's songs were unable to be released in the United States. He had recorded the song, Llorona" which Raphael had recorded in the past, selling 15,000 copies.

It was reported in the 1 June 1968 issue of Record World that Santana would be getting heavy promotion from Ibersound International, and he was expected to soon debut in North America alongside Raquelita Castaños.

Santana's album Vol II was released on Ibersound IB-587. The album included the tracks; "Cierro Mis Ojos", "Honey", "Con tu Amor", "Perdonala", "Rebeldía", "Dime que Si", and "Que Nadie Sepa mi Sufrir". It was reviewed in the 31 August issue of Record World, with the reviewer referring to it as a fantastic album. It was also noted that the artist was breaking all records.

For the week of 21 September, Santana's single, "Honey" was at no. 1 on the Latin American Single Hit Parade chart in Miami, and No. 1 on the Tampa chart. It was also at no. 2 in New York, sharing the spot with Vicentico Valdós' version.

"Tu No Sabes Querer" was at no. 2 on the Latin American Single Hit Parade chart for Columbia for the week of 28 September. Also that week, his version of "Honey" was at no. 1 with Vicentico Valdós' version in the Latin American Single Hit Parade, New York chart.

For the week of 12 October 1968, Oscar Santana with his version of "Honey" was sharing the no. 1 spot on the Latin American Single Hit Parade New York chart with Vicentico Valdós and his version.

For the week of 26 October 1968, Santana's Honey LP was at no 1 on the Latin American LP Hit Parade chart.

For the week of 30 November 1968 his single "Honey" was at no. 1 on the Latin American Single Hit Parade chart for Tampa. It was also sharing the no. 4 spot in New York with Vicentico Valdós' version.

"Tu No Sabes Querer" was at no. 9 in the Latin American Single Hit Parade chart for Columbia for the week of 7 December. His single "Honey" was again sharing the spot with Vicentico Valdós' version, now at no. 5. It was still at the no. 5 spot on the New York chart the following week.

=== 1970s - 1980s ===
Santana was booked to appear at the International Song Festival held in Buenos Aires on 25 February 1970. Other artists to appear included, Nadia Kosmepopulos (Greece), The Sherry Sister, and Bill Forma (United States), Nydia Caro (Puerto Rico), Horacio Dugan (Argentina), N A. Francki (Spain), César Altamirano (Peru), Raquel Castaño (Venezuela).

It was reported in the 1 August 1970 issue of Record World that Oscar Santana who was representing Venezuela, Ricardo Fuentes who was representing Colombia, and Rosario de Alba who was representing Mexico would appear at the Miami Song Festival which was to take place in a few weeks' time.

=== 1990s - 2010s ===
Santana's album Querencias was released on Discan DCD-026 in 1994.

== Personal life ==
His wife is María Herminia Valladares (Mariela), who was Born in Caracas, on 22 September 1949.
