= Los Crich =

Spanish rock band

- Origin: Spain
- Genres: Rock music, garage rock, psychedelic rock
- Years active: 1968 - 1974
- Labels: Fonoguanche, Fonal, Los '80 Pasan Factura
- Past members: Gustavo González; Toni Romero; Rafael Martín; Arturo Cárdenas

Los Crich was a Spanish rock band that recorded several singles from the late 1960s until the early 1970s. They achieved a degree of popularity in their home country.

== Background ==
Los Crich was a Spanish group with R&B, garage rock and psychedelic leanings. It was made up of Gustavo González on guitar, Toni Romero on guitar and vocals, Rafael Martín on bass and backing vocals, and Arturo Cárdenas on drums. González was from Gran Canaria, and the other three were from Seville.

In the five years from 1969 to 1973, the group recorded three singles.

Gustavo González was an experienced musician. Prior to forming Los Crich, he was in the group, Nosotros. His brother Ramiro González owned the Fonoguanche record label, which released records for Carlitos Romano, Nina Rojas, Los Sabandeños, Oscar Santana and Guayaquí 3 etc.

== Career ==
The band started out in 1968 when Gustavo González who had experience with playing in several bands contacted three musicians; Toni Romero, Rafael Martín, and Arturo Cárdenas, who were from Seville. They invited him in. This was the beginning of Los Crich. The material they covered was soul and rhythm & blues songs, and one of the groups whose material they covered was The Chambers Brothers.

Due to the success the group was having, they had an offer to go to Madrid to record a single. However, with equipment issues, they decided to go to Gran Canaria to work on their sound and get the right equipment so that they wouldn't encounter any problems in the future.

They recorded "All Strung Out Over You" bw "I Can't Stand It" which was released on Fonoguanche FG-S1 in 1969. Both "All Strung Out Over You" and "I Can't Stand It" had previously been recorded by the Chambers Brothers, with the latter having been written by Lester Chambers. Years later, Txema Mañeru of Sonic Wave Magazine said that Los Crich took on the psychedelic garage sound of the Chambers Brothers in their battle cry, 'I Can't Stand It. Both sides were also reviewed years later by Lafonoteca. In spite of referring to "All Strung Out Over You" as "messy rhythm and blues", the reviewer said that Arturo's tribal percussion, Gustavo's harmonica-like riffs, and Toni's swashbuckling vocals music should be highlighted. Referring to "I Can't Stand It" as "Pure psychedelic garage, enhanced by the poor recording", the reviewer said that with other styles it would have been a handicap but with the recording, it added some authenticity.

In 1970, the group took on two new members, singer, Rafael Domínguez and organist Pepe Marrufo who had been in the group, Los Soñadores. The group was now a six-man ensemble. Rafael Domínguez didn't last long in the group and left.

In 1971, the group released "Dunia" bw "Sentimientos". This release showed a change in sound for the group and the rough edge was gone.

There was a limitation in the group's appearances due to military service and some other issues. The group would go back to its original four-man line up.

In 1974 they released the single, "Moon Time" bw "Hold On". By then they were venturing into reggae and glam rock. Due to issues with the music industry and other issues, the group broke up that year.

== Later years ==
It was reported by Diego Hernandez, a journalist with La Provincia in February 2015 that a CD album containing their first three singles was to be released. It was released on the Los '80 Pasan Factura label, in association with Asociación Cultural del Disco Canario.

== Members ==
- Gustavo González - guitar
- Toni Romero - guitar and vocals
- Rafael Martín - bass and backing vocals
- Arturo Cárdenas - drums
- Rafael Domínguez - vocals (joined 1970)
- Pepe Marrufo - organ (joined 1970)

== Discography ==
=== Singles ===
- Los Crich – "All Strung Aut Over You" / "I Can't Stand It" - Fonoguanche FG-S1 - 1969
- Los Crich – "Dunia" / "Sentimientos" - Fonoguanche FGS-2 - 1971
- Crich – "Moontime" / "Hold On" - Fonal RA-105 - 1974

=== Albums ===
- Los Crich – Discografía 1969 - 1974 - 2015
