= Por Qué Será =

Studio album by Rudy La Scala
- Released: 1991
- Recorded: Audio Uno, Caracas, Venezuela
- Genre: Latin pop
- Label: Sonotone
- Producer: Rudy La Scala

Rudy La Scala chronology
Cuando Yo Amo (1990)	Por Qué Será (1991)	Sentimientos (1996)

Por Qué Será (Why Would That Be?) is an album released by Venezuelan performer Rudy La Scala in 1991. The album reached the top ten in the Billboard Latin Pop Albums chart and includes La Scala's second number-one single at the Top Latin Songs.

== Track listing ==
All tracks written and performed by Rudy La Scala.

No.	Title	Length
1.	"Mi Amor Divino"
2.	"Es Que Eres Tú"
3.	"Por Qué Será"
4.	"No Soy el Mismo Hombre"
5.	"Amigo Gringo"
6.	"Come Compañero"
7.	"Si Amas, Déjalo Libre"
8.	"Me Cambiaste la Vida"
9.	"Cree"
10.	"Cuando el Corazón"
11.	"Los Amigos de Mi Barrio"

== Chart performance ==
Chart (1991)	Peak position
US Billboard Latin Pop Albums	9
