= Sonográfica =

- Parent company: Distribuidora Sonografica C.A.
- Distributor: The Orchard
- Genre: Various
- Country of origin: Venezuela
- Location: Caracas - Venezuela
- Official website: {www.sonografica.com}

Sonográfica is a record label based in Caracas, Venezuela. It had links with Empresas 1BC, which also owned Radio Caracas Televisión (RCTV) and Radio Caracas Radio, among other businesses.

== Background ==
Sonográfica was the parent company of US independent label, Sonotone.

During the 1980s, it supported Venezuelan musical talent as the result of a national decree known as "One for One", which required radio stations to play one song performed by a Venezuelan artist for every foreign song. This way, numerous Venezuelan artists such as Ilan Chester, Maria Rivas, Daiquirí, Franco de Vita, Carlos Mata, Rudy La Scala, Yordano etc., were promoted locally and internationally. Other artists to have releases on the label were Oscar Santana.

The label always maintained a rivalry with its counterpart: the Cisneros Organisation, partners of Rodven Discos and its affiliate, Sonorodven Distributors. Every release by the latter company resulted in a release from Sonográfica.

Sonográfica was solely a music-distributing company for the products coming from their pressing plant Sonoindustrial and which was often recorded in their own studio, Telearte Studios. Sonográfica's releases were very popular. Their alliances with Palacio and Velvet promoted a higher number of artists, and allow them to release music based on their catalog only. Sonografica continues to be owned and operated by Empresas 1BC. Its catalog is being distributed worldwide by The Orchard.

== History ==
It was reported in the 13 December 1986 issue of Billboard that the label had signed a female merengue group; Las Chicas Del Can who had good chart profile. According to Billboard, most record companies were hoping to capitalize on to the trend of merengue which had a sudden popularity, a genre that had its origins in the Dominican Republic.

In June 1989, Oscar Llord became the general manager for Sonotone, the subsidiary of Sonográfica. Over the next fifteen months, he got the label to sign a distribution agreement with Bronco Records. The result of that brought salsa artists such as Bobby Valentin, Willie Rosario and Jose Medina to Sonotone.

It was reported by Tony Sabournin in the 29 September 1990 issue of Cash Box that the group Menudo had been signed to the Sonotone label in the United States, and Sonográfica in Venezuela. The man credited with bringing the group to the label was Oscar Llord.

Sonográfica is still active, but it is far from being the business that promoted national talent in Venezuela as it used to do in the past. Its operation has been affected by the increase in piracy and by the absence of a link with the Empresas 1BC, which provided support in their early days.

== Controversies ==
Sonográfica, along with its counterpart Rodven Discos, did not escape censure and controversy caused by many of its releases. Some examples include:

- In 1990, former President Carlos Andrés Pérez prohibited the playing on air of the Christmas song "La Gata Blanca" ("The White Cat"). Public opinion supposed that the prohibition, more than for its political content (it attacked two political figures), occurred because of two words which were spoken in the song.
- In 1991, the CD "Las Odas de Emilio Lovera" ("The Odes of Emilio Lovera"), produced by the comedian Laureano Márquez and interpreted by his colleague Emilio Lovera was vetted and those responsible for it were investigated by the Ministry of Transport and Communications. The reason given was that this album was offensive to the President, as well as to many other political figures.
- In 1994, after pop singer Ricardo Montaner fell out with his record label, Sonorodven, Sonográfica took him under its wing. This occurrence caused a legal dispute between the two companies, and increased the struggle that existed between them for over 14 years.
