= Los Flamers =

Mexican Cumbia band

- Origin: Veracruz, Mexico
- Genres: Cumbia
- Years active: 1974–present
- Labels: RCA, Sony BMG, Musart, Universal Music Latino, I.M., Regio
- Members: Roberto Eugenio Bueno Campos Oscar Castellanos; Javier Duran; Francisco Lopez; Enrique Cervantes; Juan Dominguez Miguel Angel Carreon; Alexander Caicedo; Jorge Sanchez
- Website: www.facebook.com/losflamersoficial

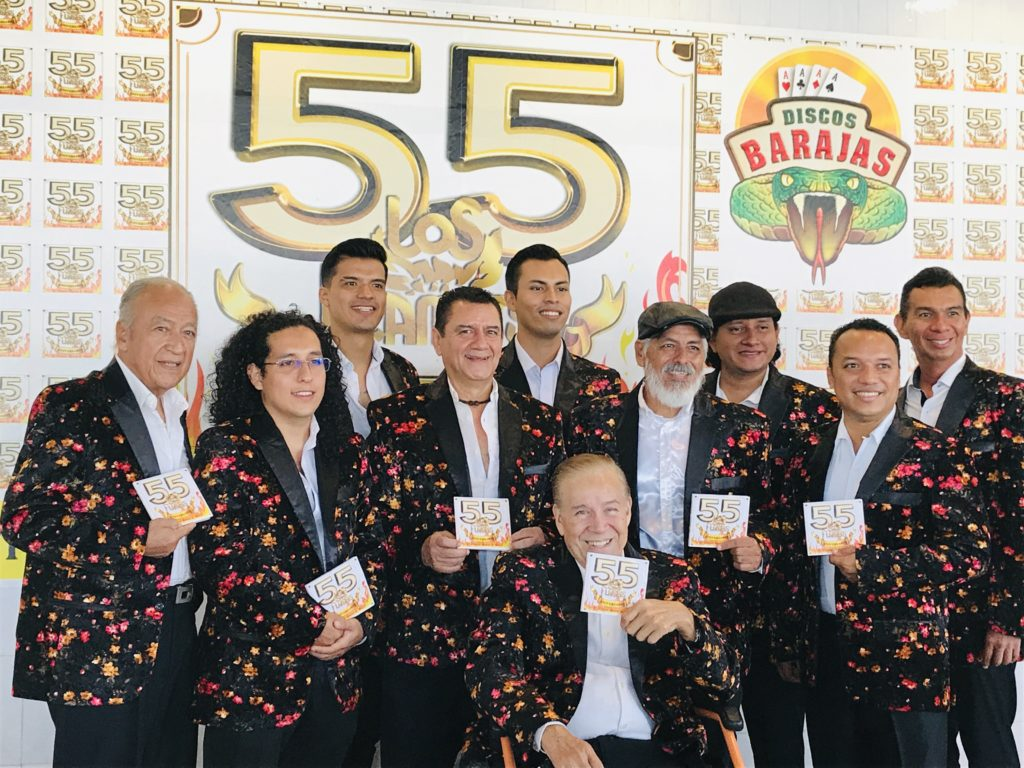
Los Flamers in 2022

Los Flamers are a Mexican Cumbia band, formed in the mid-1970s by Roberto Eugenio Bueno Campos. They are known for their hits such as "El Chicle", "El Tizón","Juana La Cubana", "Atol de Elote", "Juana La Bailadora", "Viva El Amor", "Mira Mira Mira", "Flamazo Navideño" and "Camarón Pelao". Members of the group include Roberto Bueno, Armando Vazquez, Paco Valerio, Fernando Lopez, Manny Dominguez, Salvador Iglesias, Jose Pacheco, Yoc Pacheco, Sammy Sánchez and David Roman.

Between 1978 and 1995 they released a string of albums on RCA Records/Sony BMG. They began their career doing cover versions of songs by US and British bands, and became one of the most popular cumbia groups in Mexico.

== Discography ==
- Los Flamers (1978), Sony BMG/RCA
- Los Flamers 2, RCA
- Los Flamers 3, RCA
- Los Flamers 4, RCA
- Bailemos Cumbiarengue (1985), RCA
- Te Amo Chunchaca (1990), RCA
- Gran Reventon, RCA
- Gran Reventon vol. 2 (1990), Sony BMG/RCA
- Flamazo Navideño (1990), Sony BMG/RCA
- Atol De Elote (1990), BMG
- Los Reyes del Baile (1991), RCA
- Dime Si Te Gusto (1992), RCA
- Gran Reventon Gran, Vol. 7 (1992), Sony BMG/RCA
- O Que O Que O Que (1993), RCA
- Agua (1995), Musart
- Amor a Primera Vista (1995), Musart
- Gran Reventon '95 (1996), Musart
- Flamazo '96 (1996), Musart
- Flamazo '97 (1997)
- Flamazo '98 (1998), Musart
- Gran Reventon '98 (1999), Musart
- Flamazo '99 (1999), Musart
- Gran Reventon '99 (1999), Musart
- Gran Reventon Navideno (2001), Universal Music Latino
- A Puro Flamazo (2002), I.M.
- Y Siguen los Flamazos (2002), I.M.
- 20 Super Flamazos (2003), I.M.
- Flamozos (2003), RCA
- Flamazo Colombiano (2003), Sony BMG/RCA
- Flamazo Dinamita (2003), I.M.
- Reventón Navideño (2004), I.M.
- Pendiente (2004), I.M.
- Flamazo Reggaeton (2007), International Latin America
- Gran Baile Navideño (2008)
- Serie 20 Exitos
- De Puro Reventon, Vol. 1
- De Puro Reventon, Vol. 2
- Flamazo Tmbiriche
- La más grande colección navideña
