= Más Grande Que Nunca =

Más grande que nunca

Studio album by Frankie Ruiz
- Released: August 14, 1989
- Genre: Salsa
- Label: Rodven Records
- Producer: Frank Torrest

Frankie Ruiz chronology
En vivo y a todo color (1988)	Más grande que nunca (1989)	Mi libertad (1992)

Singles from Más grande que nunca
- 1. "Tú eres" Released: August 1989; 2. "En época de celo" Released: December 1989

Professional ratings
Review scores
Source	Rating
Allmusic	4.5/5 stars

Más grande que nunca (Bigger than ever) is the fourth studio album recorded by salsa singer Frankie Ruiz released in 1989. The album became his fourth number-one album on the Billboard Tropical Albums chart.

== Track listing ==
This information adapted from Allmusic.

No.	Title	Writer(s)	Length
1.	"Para Darte Fuego"	Chein Garcia	4:42
2.	"Tú Eres"	Chein Garcia	4:30
3.	"Me Dejó"	Valter Polignano	4:53
4.	"Entre el Fuego y la Pared"	Pedro Azael	4:29
5.	"Amantes de Otro Tiempo"	Pedro Azael	4:26
6.	"En Época de Celo"	Pedro Azael	4:04
7.	"Deseándote"	Chein Garcia	4:45
8.	"Señora"	Pedro Azael	4:23

== Personnel ==
- Photography - Al Freddy
- Model - Allison
- Trombone - Antonio Tonito Vasquez
- Bongos - Celso Clemente
- Composer - Cheín García
- Background Vocals - Eddie Santiago
- Arranger - Ernesto Sanchez
- Producer - Frank Torres
- Primary Artist, Vocals - Frankie Ruiz
- Congas - Jimmy Morales
- Arranger, Mixing, Recording Director - Julio Cesar Delgado
- Piano - Lenny Prieto
- Model - Lily
- Trumpet - Mario Ortiz, Jr.
- Background Vocals - Nino Segarra
- Composer - Pedro Azael
- Bass - Pedro Pérez
- Bata, Timbales - Santiago "Chago" Martínez
- Arranger, Trumpet - Tommy Villarini
- Engineer, Mixing - Vinny Urrutia
- Trumpet - Ángel "Angie" Machado

== Charts ==
Chart (1990)	Peak position
U.S. Billboard Tropical Albums	1

== See also ==
- List of Billboard Tropical Albums number ones from the 1990s
