= Los Sabandeños =

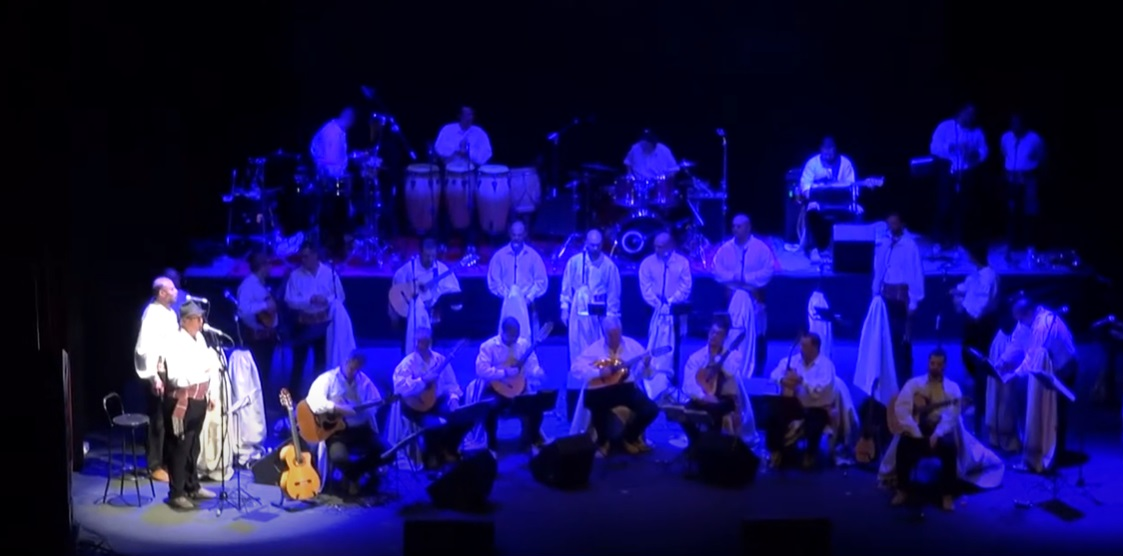
- Los Sabandeños performing in 2016

Background information
- Origin: Canary Islands
- Genre: Folk
- Years active: 1965 - present
- Labels: Fonoguanche, Manzana, Zafiro

Los Sabandeños is a large folk group from the Canary Islands. They have had a multitude of albums released during their sixty-year career.

== Background ==
The history of Los Sabandeños can be traced back to San Cristóbal de La Laguna-born Elfidio Alonso Quintero, born in 1935. Along with Enrique Martín Núñez, he created the group in 1965. They had the agenda to preserve and promote the musical folklore of the Canary Islands.

In the 1960s, the group recorded for the Fonoguanche record label. A Canary Islands label that released recordings for Carlitos Romano, Nina Rojas, Oscar Santana, Guayaquí 3 and Los Crich etc.

During the course of the group's existence, they have released over 95 albums.

== Career ==
=== 1960s - 1980s ===
In 1967, the group had their single released on the Fonoguanche label.

In 1970, the group released their Misa Sabandeña album on Barnafon BN-LP 251.

It was reported in the 24 January 1976 issue of Record World, Los Sabandeños had the award for the Best folklore group.

In 1977, their Las Seguidillas del Salinero album was released.

=== 1990s - 2020s ===
In 1990, the group released their A La Luz De La Luna album on the Zafiro label. It was released in both vinyl LP and CD formats, selling over 100,000 copies in Spain, earning it platinum status. The following year, their Íntimamente album sold 50,000 copies.

In 1993, the group released its Canario album. The album featured Argentine 1986 World Cup soccer hero Jorge Valdano as well as Alfredo Kraus. The album reportedly sold 50,000 within the first fifteen days following its release. According to the article by Howell Llewellyn in the 15 January 1994 issue of Billboard, the band performed at sell out concert in Madrid. They were given an award by SGAE for their services to Spanish music. They performed another concert after that which was a sell-out event.

It was reported by Billboard in the 16 November 1996 issue that Los Sabandeños had an album Mar on the Manzana Records label. The album was released on 15 October after a launch event on the island of Tenerife, which was dedicated to the sea. It contained eighteen tracks, most of them were international standards. The songs included "La Mar" by Charles Trenet, "The Girl from Ipanema" by Vinicius de Moraes and Antonio Carlos Jobim etc. Luis Eduardo Aute, Venezuelan singer Inarhú, and Yamila Cafrune were the album's guest vocalists.

With vocalists, José Manuel Ramos and Héctor González, the group was booked to appear at the Auditorio de Tenerife on the 25th and 26th of May 2024. The concerts were a tribute to Elfidio Alonso.

The group had a sixtieth anniversary concert on 11 October 2025 at the Alfredo Kraus Auditorium.
