= Imágenes (Lourdes Robles album) =

Studio album by Lourdes Robles
- Released: 1990
- Genre: Latin pop
- Label: CBS
- Producer: Rudy Pérez, Ricardo Eddy

Lourdes Robles chronology
Lourdes Robles (1989)	Imágenes (1990)	Definitivamente (1991)

Imágenes (Images), is the title of the second studio album released by Puerto-Rican singer Lourdes Robles in 1990. The album became very successful in the United States where it peaked at number nine in the Billboard Latin Pop Albums chart. The album includes the number-one single "Abrázame Fuerte", and the top ten hit "Gracias a Tu Amor", a duet with Nicaraguan performer Luis Enrique. "Miedo", "Que Lástima", “La Nota Ideal” and "Es Él" were released as singles, reaching the Top 40 in the US.

Imágenes was produced by Rudy Perez and Ricardo Eddy and features songs written by both producers, Omar Sánchez, Jorge Luis Piloto and Manuel Alejandro. The album was awarded with a Gold album certification.

== Track listing ==
The information is taken from the album liner notes.

No.	Title	Writer(s)	Length
1.	"Abrázame Fuerte"	Jorge Luis Piloto	4:18
2.	"Es Él"	Lourdes Robles	3:18
3.	"Chin-Chin (Brindemos Por Nosotros)"	Rudy Pérez, Ricardo Eddy, Omar Sánchez	3:42
4.	"Gracias a Tu Amor (duet with Luis Enrique)"	Eddy, Piloto	3:44
5.	"Miedo"	Perez, Sánchez	3:00
6.	"Que Lástima"	Perez, Sánchez	4:18
7.	"Dime Cómo Llego a Tí"	Perez, Sanchez	4:00
8.	"La Nota Ideal"	Perez, Sanchez	4:12
9.	"Ni Tú, Ni Yo"	Manuel Alejandro	4:45

== Chart performance ==
Chart (1990)	Peak position
US Billboard Latin Pop Albums	9
