= 40 y 20 (album) =

Studio album by José José
- Released: November 24, 1992
- Recorded: 1992
- Genre: Latin pop
- Length: 41:32
- Label: BMG International U.S. Latin
- Producer: Roberto Livi

José José chronology
En las Buenas... y en las Malas (1990)	40 y 20 (1992)	30 años de ser El Príncipe (1994)

40 y 20 is a 1992 album by José José. It was the singer's first collaboration with Argentine songwriter and producer Roberto Livi. The title track "40 y 20", about the relationship of a man of 40 with a girl of 20, was a major hit spending over 17 weeks on the charts and peaking at number four. The next single "Eso no más", spent 15 weeks and peaked at number five. The album went triple gold.

The publication of this album coincided with the most dramatic stage in the life of the performer which was, according to the DVD of the documentary Biography in Song: Volume 3, a product of deteriorated health due to alcohol and substance abuse. His second divorce after 17 years of marriage with Ana Elena Noreña Grass depressed José José, causing him to relapse into alcoholism and end up living in a taxi, about to give up everything, deciding to wait for the release of death. However, thanks to his faith, he recovered. The singles that stand out of this album are: "40 y 20", "Cirano", "Eso nomás", "Lo que quedó de mí" and "Así de fácil".

== Track listing ==
No.	Title	Writer(s)	Length
1.	"40 y 20"	Roberto Livi	4:05
2.	"Así de fácil"	Roberto Livi	3:48
3.	"Eso Nomás"	Roberto Livi · Bebu Silvetti	4:23
4.	"Ando Volando Bajo"	Roberto Livi	4:06
5.	"Esta Noche"	Roberto Livi	4:33
6.	"Cirano"	Roberto Livi · Alejandro Vezzani	4:32
7.	"Como Le Haces (Esas Mujeres)"	Roberto Livi · Alejandro Vezzani	3:57
8.	"Egoísta"	Roberto Livi	3:32
9.	"Porque No"	Roberto Livi · Julián Navarro	4:53
10.	"Lo Que Quedó De Mí"	Roberto Livi	3:48

== Certifications ==
Region	Certification	Certified units/sales
Mexico (AMPROFON)	Platinum+2× Gold	450,000^{‡}
^{‡} Sales+streaming figures based on certification alone.
