= ¿Por Qué Te Tengo Que Olvidar? =

Single by José Feliciano

from the album Niña
- Released: 1990
- Recorded: 1989–1990
- Genre: Latin pop; Latin ballad
- Length: 4:15
- Label: EMI Capitol Latin
- Songwriters: Luis Ángel; Edwin Apolinaris; Tommy Villarini
- Producers: Rudy Pérez; Ricardo Eddy Martínez

José Feliciano singles chronology
"No Te Arrepentirás" (1988)	"¿Por Qué Te Tengo Que Olvidar?" (1990)	"No Puedo Estar Sin Tí" (1991)

"¿Por Qué Te Tengo Que Olvidar?" (English: Why Do I Have to Forget You?) is a ballad written by Luis Ángel, co-written by Edwin Apolinaris and Tommy Villarini, produced by Rudy Pérez, co-produced by Ricardo Eddy Martínez and performed by Puerto Rican-American singer-songwriter José Feliciano. The song was released as the lead single from the studio album Niña (1990). The track became Feliciano's first number-one single in the Billboard Top Latin Songs chart. The parent album, dedicated to his then newborn child, became commercially successful, peaking at number three in the Latin Pop Albums chart in the United States. Feliciano recorded the song after the end of a period in which he stayed away from the stage to devote time to his family and fulfilling his dream of hosting a radio program. The singer received a Grammy Award for Best Latin Pop Performance for the song in the 33rd Annual Grammy Awards on 20 February 1991, his sixth Grammy Award overall.

The song debuted on the Billboard Top Latin Songs chart (formerly Hot Latin Tracks) at number 23 in the week of 21 July 1990, climbing to the top ten four weeks later, peaking at number-one on 15 September 1990, holding this position for two weeks, replacing "Tengo Todo Excepto a Tí" by Mexican singer Luis Miguel, and being succeeded at the top by José José's "Amnesia". In 2000, a tribute to José Feliciano's work was released, entitled Guitarra Mia, with the participation of several performers including Marc Anthony, Son by Four, Gilberto Santa Rosa, Gisselle, Lucecita Benitez, Nydia Caro, Danny Rivera, Manny Manuel, Prodigio, and Ednita Nazario. This album includes a cover version of "¿Por Qué Te Tengo Que Olvidar?" by Millie Corretjer. Grupo Atrapado, Germán Montero, Vinicio Quezada, Johnny Ray, Eddie Santiago and Sergio Vargas have also recorded the song.

Its music video was directed by Angel Garcia and he received a nomination for Best Director for the video in the Latin field at the 1990 Billboard Music Video Awards. It was nominated in the category of Best Video by a Male Artist in the Latin field.
