= Millie Puente =

American Latin jazz singer

Millie Puente (born 1958) is an American Latin jazz singer. She is cousin of Tito Puente and earned a Grammy Award for Best Traditional Tropical Latin Album nomination with her first album, Tito Puente Presents Millie P in 1991. In 2002 she was reported to be writing a book and working on a tribute album to Puente.
