= List of number-one albums of 1990 (Spain) =

The List of number-one albums of 1990 in Spain is derived from the Top 100 España record chart published weekly by PROMUSICAE (Productores de Música de España), a non-profit organization composed by Spain and multinational record companies. This association tracks record sales (physical and digital) in Spain.

== Albums ==
| Week | Chart date | Album | Artist |
|---|---|---|---|
| 1 | January 1 | Boom 5 | Varios Artistas |
| 2 | January 8 | ...But Seriously | Phil Collins |
| 3 | January 15 | ...But Seriously | Phil Collins |
| 4 | January 22 | ...But Seriously | Phil Collins |
| 5 | January 29 | ...But Seriously | Phil Collins |
| 6 | February 5 | ...But Seriously | Phil Collins |
| 7 | February 12 | ...But Seriously | Phil Collins |
| 8 | February 19 | ...But Seriously | Phil Collins |
| 9 | February 26 | ...But Seriously | Phil Collins |
| 10 | March 5 | ...But Seriously | Phil Collins |
| 11 | March 12 | ...But Seriously | Phil Collins |
| 12 | March 19 | Violator | Depeche Mode |
| 13 | March 26 | Veneno en la Piel | Radio Futura |
| 14 | April 2 | Veneno en la Piel | Radio Futura |
| 15 | April 9 | Veneno en la Piel | Radio Futura |
| 16 | April 16 | Veneno en la Piel | Radio Futura |
| 17 | April 23 | Veneno en la Piel | Radio Futura |
| 18 | April 30 | Nuevo Pequeño Catálogo de Seres y Estares | El Último de la Fila |
| 19 | May 7 | Nuevo Pequeño Catálogo de Seres y Estares | El Último de la Fila |
| 20 | May 14 | Nuevo Pequeño Catálogo de Seres y Estares | El Último de la Fila |
| 21 | May 21 | Nuevo Pequeño Catálogo de Seres y Estares | El Último de la Fila |
| 22 | May 28 | Nuevo Pequeño Catálogo de Seres y Estares | El Último de la Fila |
| 23 | June 4 | Nuevo Pequeño Catálogo de Seres y Estares | El Último de la Fila |
| 24 | June 11 | Nuevo Pequeño Catálogo de Seres y Estares | El Último de la Fila |
| 25 | June 18 | Todo Panchos | Los Panchos |
| 26 | June 25 | Todo Panchos | Los Panchos |
| 27 | July 2 | The Beach Boys Collection | The Beach Boys |
| 28 | July 9 | The Beach Boys Collection | The Beach Boys |
| 29 | July 16 | The Beach Boys Collection | The Beach Boys |
| 30 | July 23 | The Beach Boys Collection | The Beach Boys |
| 31 | July 30 | The Beach Boys Collection | The Beach Boys |
| 32 | August 6 | The Beach Boys Collection | The Beach Boys |
| 33 | August 13 | The Beach Boys Collection | The Beach Boys |
| 34 | August 20 | The Beach Boys Collection | The Beach Boys |
| 35 | August 27 | Carreras Domingo Pavarotti in Concert | José Carreras, Plácido Domingo y Luciano Pavarotti |
| 36 | September 3 | Carreras Domingo Pavarotti in Concert | José Carreras, Plácido Domingo y Luciano Pavarotti |
| 37 | September 10 | Carreras Domingo Pavarotti in Concert | José Carreras, Plácido Domingo y Luciano Pavarotti |
| 38 | September 17 | Carreras Domingo Pavarotti in Concert | José Carreras, Plácido Domingo y Luciano Pavarotti |
| 39 | September 24 | Carreras Domingo Pavarotti in Concert | José Carreras, Plácido Domingo y Luciano Pavarotti |
| 40 | October 1 | Carreras Domingo Pavarotti in Concert | José Carreras, Plácido Domingo y Luciano Pavarotti |
| 41 | October 8 | Carreras Domingo Pavarotti in Concert | José Carreras, Plácido Domingo y Luciano Pavarotti |
| 42 | October 15 | Carreras Domingo Pavarotti in Concert | José Carreras, Plácido Domingo y Luciano Pavarotti |
| 43 | October 22 | Carreras Domingo Pavarotti in Concert | José Carreras, Plácido Domingo y Luciano Pavarotti |
| 44 | October 29 | Their Greatest Hits | The Police |
| 45 | November 5 | Pretty Woman B.S.O. de la Película | Varios Artistas |
| 46 | November 12 | Pretty Woman B.S.O. de la Película | Varios Artistas |
| 47 | November 19 | The Very Best of Elton John | Elton John |
| 48 | November 26 | The Very Best of Elton John | Elton John |
| 49 | December 3 | The Very Best of Elton John | Elton John |
| 50 | December 10 | The Very Best of Elton John | Elton John |
| 51 | December 17 | The Very Best of Elton John | Elton John |
| 52 | December 24 | The Very Best of Elton John | Elton John |
| 53 | December 31 | The Very Best of Elton John | Elton John |

== See also ==
- List of number-one singles of 1990 (Spain)
