= Personalidad: 20 Éxitos =

Compilation album by Ana Gabriel
- Released: 1992
- Recorded: 1988–1991
- Genre: Pop, ranchera, regional
- Length: 71:18
- Label: Sony
- Producer: Ana Gabriel, Mariano Pérez, Oscar Gómez, Max Pierre

Ana Gabriel chronology
Silueta (1992)	Personalidad: 20 Éxitos (1992)	Luna (1993)

Personalidad: 20 Éxitos is a compilation album by Mexican singer-songwriter Ana Gabriel. It was released in 1992 by Sony Music. It was repackaged as The Best in the United States, where it peaked at number two on the Billboard Latin Pop Albums chart and received a multiplatinum certification by the RIAA for sales over 200,000 units.

== Track listing ==
No.	Title	Writer(s)	Length
1.	"Quién Como Tú"	Ana Gabriel	03:32
2.	"Pecado Original (live version taken from En Vivo)"	Gabriel, Michael Sullivan, Paulo Massadas	03:34
3.	"Ay Amor"	Gabriel	03:22
4.	"Destino"	Gabriel	04:00
5.	"Mar y Arena"	Gabriel	04:00
6.	"Y Aquí Estoy"	Gabriel	03:45
7.	"Malvado"	Candelario Macedo	02:38
8.	"Amor Con Desamor"	Gabriel	03:38
9.	"Pensar en Ti"	Carlos Gómez, Maria Rosario Ovelar, Mariano Pérez	03:48
10.	"Que Poco Hombre"	Omar Alfanno	03:31
11.	"Es Demasiado Tarde"	Gabriel	04:12
12.	"Amor"	José María Guzmán	04:21
13.	"Simplemente Amigos"	Gabriel	03:47
14.	"A Tu Lado"	Gabriel, Lalo Rodríguez	03:17
15.	"Es el Amor Quien Llega"	Gómez, Pérez	03:48
16.	"¿Qué Nos Paso?"	Gabriel, Tony Flores	03:36
17.	"Búscame"	Gabriel, Flores	02:56
18.	"Eso No Basta"	Gabriel, Flores	03:38
19.	"Llévame"	Rodríguez	03:23
20.	"Lo Quiero Todo"	Ricardo Zurita	02:56

== Charts ==
=== The Best ===
Chart (1993)	Peak position
US Billboard Top Latin Albums	20
US Billboard Latin Pop Albums	2

=== Personalidad: 20 Exitos ===
Chart (2003)	Peak position
US Billboard Top Latin Albums	40
US Billboard Top Latin Albums	15

== Certifications ==
Region	Certification	Certified units/sales
United States (RIAA)	2× Platinum (Latin)	200,000^{^}
^{^} Shipments figures based on certification alone.
