= El Cariño Es Como Una Flor =

Single by Rudy La Scala

from the album Cuando Yo Amo
- Released: 1990
- Recorded: 1989–1990
- Studio: Audio Uno (Caracas, Venezuela)
- Genre: Latin
- Length: 4:13
- Label: Sonotone
- Songwriter: Rudy La Scala
- Producer: Rudy La Scala

Rudy La Scala singles chronology
"Mi Vida Eres Tú" (1985)	"El Cariño Es Como Una Flor" (1990)	"Por Qué Tu Eres La Reina" (1990)

"El Cariño Es Como Una Flor" ("Love is Like a Flower") is a song written, produced and performed by Italo-Venezuelan singer-songwriter Rudy La Scala. It was released as the lead single from Scala's fourth studio album Cuando Yo Amo (1990), and became his first number-one single in the Billboard Top Latin Songs chart while the aforementioned album peaked at number four in the Latin Pop Albums chart. The song became one of his better-known compositions after the success of the theme song from the soap opera Cristal, "Mi Vida Eres Tú", which broke sales records.

The song debuted on the Billboard Top Latin Songs chart (formerly Hot Latin Tracks) at number 35 on April 14, 1990 and rose to the top ten two weeks later. It reached the top position of the chart on June 23, 1990, replacing Mexican singer-songwriter Ana Gabriel's "Quién Como Tú" and being succeeded by "Tengo Todo Excepto a Tí" by Luis Miguel four weeks later. The same week the song peak atop the Hot Latin Tracks chart, "Tesoro Mío" performed by Guillermo Dávila and Kiara and written by La Scala, also reached its peak at number three. At the end of 1990, "El Cariño Es Como Una Flor" ranked as the best performing Latin single of the year. The song spent 25 weeks within the Top 40 and became the first top ten single for the singer in the chart, and first number-one hit. "El Carino Es Como Una Flor" was nominated for Pop Song of the Year at the Lo Nuestro Awards and has been covered by several performers including Grupo Sonni, José Antonio Santana, Jossie Esteban y la Patrulla 15, Vinicio Quezada and Oscar Sánchez. In 2013, Dominican singer Alex Matos covered the song in salsa for his album El Salsero de Ahora. A bachata version was also recorded by Matos in a duet with Andy Andy which was released as a single. The bachata version peaked at No. 6 on the Billboard Tropical Songs chart.

== Credits and personnel ==
This information adapted from Cuando Yo Amo liner notes.

- Rudy La Scala – Record producer, songwriting, vocals
- Vicente Delgado – arranger
- Nucho Bellomo – mixing

== See also ==
- List of number-one Billboard Hot Latin Tracks of 1990
- Billboard Top Latin Songs Year-End Chart
