= Amnesia (José José song) =

Single by José José

from the album En las Buenas... y en las Malas
- Released: 1990
- Recorded: 1989–1990
- Genre: Latin pop · Latin ballad
- Length: 3:45
- Label: BMG International U.S. Latin
- Songwriter: Chico Novarro · Dino Ramos
- Producer: Óscar López · Daniel Freiberg

José José singles chronology
"Piel de Azúcar" (1989)	"Amnesia" (1990)	"Atrapado" (1990)

"Amnesia" is a ballad written by Chico Novarro and co-written by Dino Ramos, produced by Óscar López and co-produced by Daniel Freiberg and performed by Mexican singer José José. The song was originally recorded by Argentinean singer-songwriter Chico Novarro in his album Que Salga El Autor, released in 1976, and by Puerto Rican-American singer-songwriter and actress Yolandita Monge in her album En Su Intimidad, released in 1978. It was released later as the lead single from José José's album En las Buenas... y en las Malas (1990), and became his fourth number-one single in the Billboard Top Latin Songs chart.

The song debuted in the Billboard Top Latin Songs chart (formerly Hot Latin Tracks) at number 17 in the week of July 7, 1990, climbing to the top ten three weeks later, peaking at number one on September 29, 1990, holding this position for one week, replacing "¿Por Qué Te Tengo Que Olvidar?" by Puerto Rican-American singer-songwriter José Feliciano, and being succeeded at the top by Myriam Hernández's "Peligroso Amor". As part of the Latin Grammy tribute to José José in 2008, Puerto Rican singer Gilberto Santa Rosa performed the song live as a bolero.

Its music video led to the artist winning the Billboard Music Video Award for Best Male Artist Video in the Latin in a tie with "Mi Mundo" by Luis Enrique.

Chart (1990)	Peak position
U.S. Billboard Hot Latin Tracks	1
