= Rudy La Scala =

Italian musician

- Also known as: Flavio (1971–1974)
- Born: Rudy La Scala; 20 January 1954 (age 72); Rocca di Papa, Lazio, Italy
- Genres: Pop; rock
- Occupations: Record producer; songwriter; singer
- Labels: Sonotone, Sonográfica
- Website: rudylascala.com

Rudy La Scala (born 20 January 1954) is a singer, songwriter and record producer, born in Rocca di Papa, Lazio, Italy. At a young age, La Scala migrated to Venezuela, where he completed his primary and secondary studies, while learning piano and guitar. He began his career with a short lived band named Las Explosiones de Goma in the 1960s. In 1971 he was presented as a solo artist under the name Flavio, finally presenting himself as Rudy La Scala in 1974. His work as a songwriter has been very successful, including songs recorded by and sale by team Guillermo Dávila, Karina, María Conchita Alonso, Kiara, Ruddy Rodríguez, Los Chamos, Proyecto M, Carlos Mata, Las Payasitas Nifu Nifa and Gerardo Mora.

As a performer, La Scala reached the top of the Billboard Top Latin Songs chart twice with "El Cariño Es Como Una Flor" and "Por Qué Será" in the 1990s. He is the only record producer with 12 platinum and nine gold certified albums in Venezuela. He also performed the theme song of the Venezuelan soap opera Cristal among others.

== Career ==
=== 1970s ===
At age 15, La Scala formed a rock band named Las Explosiones de Goma. In 1971, he debuted as a solo artist, and under the name Flavio, released the song "Piensa, Sueña y Rie". Three years later, he changed his name to Rudy La Scala and presents the song "Woman", issued in Venezuela, Brazil, France and South Africa. The following year, La Scala recorded in Italy an album with Vittorio De Scalzi, the lead singer of the Italian progressive rock band New Trolls.

In 1979, La Scala along with Cuban-Venezuelan singer María Conchita Alonso in the lead vocals formed Ambar, a disco music duo. They recorded Love Maniac, and the song "It's Time to Dance" became a hit, earning them a Gold album certification in Venezuela.

=== 1980s ===
La Scala produced The Witch, Ambar's second album in 1980; the same year he also produced Que Nota for the singer Stella. In 1983, an album written and produced by La Scala, and performed by Arturo Vázquez was released. The theme song for the 1985 soap opera Cristal, "Mi Vida Eres Tú", was written and composed by Luis Ángel and La Scala. Cristal and the song became very successful in Latin America and Spain. The song was included in La Scala's album Volvamos a Vivir, which peaked at number two in the Billboard Latin Pop Albums chart in United States. The album Tú Como Yo by Los Chamos was also produced by La Scala.

In 1986, La Scala produced the best-selling Venezuelan album in history, Amor a Millón, for the singer Karina. The album yielded two singles that reached the Top 20 in the Billboard Top Latin Songs chart, "Sé Como Duele" (#12), and "A Quién" (#19). La Scala was awarded with the Songwriter of the Year award for the single "Sé Como Duele".

La Scala also wrote "Sin Pensarlo 2 Veces" for Guillermo Dávila and "Que Bello" for the singer Kiara. Both singles became successful, as did their duet "Tesoro Mío", which peaked at number three in the Top Latin Songs chart in United States in 1989.

=== 1990s ===
In 1990 the album Cuando Yo Amo, written, produced and performed by La Scala was released. The lead single "El Cariño Es Como Una Flor" peaked at number-one in the Top Latin Songs chart for four consecutive weeks and was the best-performing Latin single of the year. Cuando Yo Amo reached number four in the Latin Pop Albums chart. The following year, the album Por Qué Será hit the Top 10 in United States, with the same titled single becoming the second number-one single for La Scala. At the 1991 Lo Nuestro Awards, La Scala was nominated for Pop Artist, Pop Song ("El Cariño Es Como Una Flor") and Album of the Year (Cuando Yo Amo).

La Scala also wrote and produced in 1996 an album for Viviana Gibelli. The same year he released the song "Cuando Mi Amada Me Ama", from the album Sentimientos. The following year the album En Cuerpo y Alma hit the record stores.

=== 2000s ===
La Scala produced a group named Axies in 2000 and also began a tour in Latin America, the United States and Europe. In 2007, the album Ofrenda de Amor a Venezuela is released. This album includes new versions of his previous hits with new instrumentation: harp, cuatro (a four string guitar), bass, maracas and keyboards. By the year 2008, La Scala continued his world tour and also produced political campaigns in Venezuela.

The singer is also known for his work writing jingles for Paper Mate, Corn flakes, Lee, Banco Exterior, Cachet, Ke, and Kraft.

== Discography ==
- Singles (1970)
- Woman (1973)
- Mi Alma es Tropical (1975)
- La muerte de Lola (1975)
- Vinto (1977)
- It's Time to Dance (1979)
- Vete al Infierno (1982)
- Volvamos a Vivir (1985)
- Como Quisiera (1988)
- Cuando Yo Amo (1990)
- Por Qué Será (1991)
- Sentimientos (1996)
- En Cuerpo y Alma (1997)
- Ofrenda de Amor a Venezuela (2007)
