= Frankie Ruiz =

Puerto Rican-American singer (1958-1998)

- Also known as: El Papá de la Salsa
- Born: José Antonio Torresola Ruiz; March 10, 1958; Paterson, New Jersey, U.S.
- Origin: Mayagüez, Puerto Rico
- Died: August 9, 1998 (aged 40) Newark, New Jersey, U.S.
- Genre: Salsa
- Occupations: Singer; songwriter
- Years active: 1971–1998
- Labels: Rodven; PolyGram
- Formerly of: Orquesta La Solución; Tommy Olivencia; La Orquesta Nueva; Charlie López

José Antonio Torresola Ruiz, better known as Frankie Ruiz (March 10, 1955 – August 9, 1998), was a Puerto Rican singer. He was a major figure in the salsa romántica subgenre that was popular in the 1980s and early 1990s.

During his youth, he developed a passion for percussion, later confessing that this would have been his second choice after singing. Fan reaction to his work was diverse. Within the Latino community, he was regarded as "one of the best salseros ever", and Puerto Ricans abroad were particularly fond of it because it brought back memories of their homeland. Among non-Latinos, some admitted that his music had been responsible for their interest in salsa as a genre and even the Spanish language.

As salsa moved closer to pop music, and toned down the eroticism in its lyrics during the 1990s, Ruiz was challenged, along with other salsa romántica performers, but he managed to record a number of hits during his late career. He suffered from years of drug and alcohol abuse. His personal shortcomings were exploited by the tabloid media but had little impact on his popularity. In 1998, Ruiz died due to complications from liver disease.

== Early life ==
Frankie Ruiz was born in Paterson, New Jersey to Frank Torresola and Hilda Ruiz, a Puerto Rican couple who had moved to the city. After being born, he was initially adopted by his grandmother, Concepción, as his mother was 15 years old. Afterwards his custody passed to his parents and he was raised in Union City, along his brothers Viti and Juanito. He received his primary and secondary school education in Paterson, where his father served as education commissioner.

At the age of 5, Ruiz played percussion instruments at the Roberto Clemente Park in Trenton and at other city venues. One of these performances earned him an award at a show held at the Majestic Theater in Paterson. During the following years, he continued performing with the support of his parents, meeting artists like Tito Puente in the process. Despite this, Ruiz was not enrolled in formal singing classes and mostly depended on practice. During this time, he developed a friendship with Joe Salvador, through which he met Rosemary Salvador, whose family sponsored his performances and those of his brothers. Both joined a local music group led by Charlie López, known as Orquesta Nueva (otherwise known as The Charlie López Orquesta), as vocalist and bass player, and started performing salsa at talent shows. He recorded his first song "Salsa Buena" with this band, which was followed by "Borinquen".

== Musical career ==
=== Beginnings as a vocalist ===
After their parents divorced, Hilda Torresola relocated to Mayagüez, Puerto Rico with the siblings. There they settled at Barrio Balboa to live with his grandmother, and other family members. By his early teens, Ruiz had begun performing at nightclubs. He became interested in a salsa band called La Solución, directed by Roberto Rivera, which he was able to join after multiple attempts. With this band, Ruiz re-recorded a new version of "Salsa Buena". As he became its lead singer and recorded the hit single titled "La Rueda" ("The Wheel"), the band was renamed Frankie Ruiz y La Solución and he toured with it for three years. Ruiz became an alcoholic and drug user following the death of his mother in a car accident, an aspect of his personal life that was emphasized by the media.

Ruiz continued performing with other bands including La Dictadora and La Moderna Vibración. In 1982, Ruiz joined Tommy Olivencia and his Primerisima Orquesta, replacing Gilberto Santa Rosa as vocalist. He recorded the hit singles "Fantasía de un capintero" and "Como lo hacen", which were followed by "Lo Dudo", "Primero Fui Yo", Como Una Estrella", and "Que Se Mueran de Envidia". In total, Ruiz participated in the recording of three albums with Olivencia: Un triángulo de triunfo, Tommy Olivencia and Celebrando otro aniversario. As his career centered around music studios, Ruiz moved to Florida with Judith Ruiz and their son Frankie Ruiz, Jr. (born in 1984), whom he encouraged to become a musician by collaborating in hip hop songs. Despite this, he had little communication with his first-born daughter, Yaritza.

=== Soloist debut and chart success ===
Frankie Ruiz "La Cura"
A 28 second sample of "La Cura" by Frankie Ruiz from his debut studio album Solista pero no solo (1985). The song was listed as the sixth best salsa song by AOL Radio.

Ruiz's first album as a soloist, Solista pero no Solo, was produced by TH-Rodven Records and directed by Willie Sotello in 1985. Led by the singles "Tú Con Él" and "La Cura", the record became the number-one Billboard Tropical Album. While Ruiz was involved in an international tour, the album reached the top spot on this list twice more, alternating with Hansel y Raúl. With singles "Esta cobardía", "Como le gustan a usted", "El camionero", "Cosas Nativas", and "Ahora me toca a mí" meeting lesser success, Solista pero no Solo ended 1986 as the best-selling Tropical/Salsa album of the year in the United States. During the tour that followed, Ruiz performed in unconventional locales including a soccer stadium (in Colombia) and a bullring in Tenerife, Spain. During this period, Tite Curet Alonso, who at the request of Richie Viera, the composer wrote a song for Viti based on the life of the brothers titled "Todo se Queda en Familia".

Following the performance of this production, Ruiz became one of several soloists who popularized the subgenre known as salsa romántica, including Eddie Santiago, Lalo Rodríguez, Tony Vega, Gilberto Santa Rosa and Tito Nieves. The success of this group led to a general resurgence of salsa which had been struggling before the expansion of merengue music in the tropical categories. His second album, Voy Pa' Encima, was released in 1987 and performed well in Puerto Rico, Spain and the United States. Led by singles "Desnúdate Mujer" and "Mujeres", the album sold over 300,000 copies and earned Ruiz the Latin Artist of the Year Billboard Music Award. The former peaked at number six on the Billboard Hot Latin Songs chart. Like its predecessor, it would reach the top of the Billboard list three times, this time alternating with Eddie Santiago's Atrevido y Diferente. A compilation album titled Historia Musical de Frankie Ruiz also reached the top of the Billboard list. His third album, En vivo... y a todo color, was released a year later and managed to sell over 200,000 copies despite Ruiz's career being affected by his addictions.

=== Hiatus and return ===
In 1988, Ruiz was involved in an altercation with a flight attendant for which he was sentenced to three years at a federal prison in Tallahassee, Florida. Parallel to this, recording label Rodven records released a new album, Más Grande Que Nunca, which contained the hit "Deseándote". The album achieved platinum sales status and which were used to sustain his family. While in jail, Ruiz underwent a detoxification process. He was allowed a temporary return to Puerto Rico, where he did some recording with Vinny Urrutia.

His contract with TH-Rodven expired during his sentence, but it was extended due to pre-established obligations, which led to the schedule of two albums before he was released. Approaching his release, Ruiz began promoting a purported lifestyle change and worked on the release of "Mi Libertad" (My Freedom). The album had 50,000 pre-sale orders. Two songs from the album, the title track and "Bailando", peaked at number ten on the Hot Latin Songs chart. "Bailando" was nominated in the category of Tropical Song of the Year at the 1993 Lo Nuestro Awards. The album was certified platinum after selling over 100,000 copies. During this timeframe he outsold Sergio Vargas, Gilberto Santa Rosa, Xavier, Juan Luis Guerra, Jerry Rivera, and Rey Ruiz.

His collaboration with Urrutia led to a series of singles including "Hablame", "Amor a medias", "Soy culpable", "Obsesión", "Sueño dormido", "Tiene que saber que es ella", "Soledad", and "Nos sorprendio el amanecer", which would serve as the basis for Ruiz's next album, Puerto Rico Soy Tuyo, released in 1993. During the following year, Ruiz was involved in a South American tour and events held in the tri-state area. In December 1994, Ruiz released Mirandoté, with the eponymous single becoming his first to become the number one song on the Billboard Tropical Songs chart. Between 1995 and 1996, Rodven released a compilation of themes named Oro Salsero, which was divided into two albums and was accompanied by presentations in the tri-state area. Following the death of his brother, Juan Félix Ruiz, his addictions were exacerbated and begun affecting his general health.

His final album Tranquilo was recorded in a studio in Santurce, Puerto Rico and was released in 1996. Its lead single, "Ironía", became another number one song on the Tropical Songs chart and ended the year as the best-performing Tropical/Salsa song. For this achievement, the song won the award for "Tropical/Salsa Hot Latin Track of the Year" at the 1997 Billboard Latin Music Awards.

== Illness and death ==
=== Diagnosis and hospitalizations ===
In 1996, Ruiz's liver began to fail leading to a hospitalization and a temporary coma, during which his vocal cords were damaged when an intubation process was undertaken. Initially Ruiz was unable to speak and was worried about his career. The later stages of his career were affected by a rocky relationship with his son, and an unstable singing career. Shortly afterwards, his relationship with Judith Ruiz ended, and he moved from Florida and settled in New Jersey. There he reunited with Joe Salvador and offered him a job as his agent and began a relationship with Rosemary Salvador. Their relationship was not well received by her religious family, who tried to enroll him in rehabilitation centers, and the couple relocated.

In January 1997, Ruiz's health continued to decline as a result of his lifestyle, leading to the development of cirrhosis and hepatitis, which resulted in three hospitalizations that lasted for months and extended throughout August. The worst of these bouts resulted in a temporary coma, where he was placed on a respirator, his case considered virtually hopeless by the staff at University Hospital. Knowing the severity of his health, Ruiz developed an interest in religion, initially becoming involved with Santería and adapting his clothing and furbishing his house with figures of orishas.

Ruiz attended the Billboard Latin Music Conference that started on April 28, 1997, at the InterContinental Miami, where he received a recognition. Despite the hiatus, his popularity remained and Ruiz began working towards a comeback in November 1997. On November 8, 1997, he made a return appearance at the Tropicana club in North Bergen, New Jersey. The announcement of his performance drew a sizable crowd. Now possessing a rougher voice, Ruiz began a tour of clubs that continued in the Bronx.

Ruiz eventually grew tired of dietary restrictions and protocols and at the insistence of Salvador, became a born again Christian. As before, he opted to adapt his lifestyle to reflect this change in religious affiliation. Ruiz remained unaffiliated with any particular church, and avoided congregations, but reflected his new faith in these activities. A decision to become sober was met with a period of withdrawal that affected his mental health but subsided, leading to an improvement in his hepatic condition. During this timeframe, Ruiz only made select appearances. He began a career in religious music, a decision revealed to the public during the winter when he began wearing a large gold cross and preaching during several appearances.

=== Recording "Vuelvo a Nacer" ===
Aware of the seriousness of his cirrhosis, Ruiz began making arrangements in his personal life. Consequently, he contacted his friends and family during the holidays and became engaged on December 24, 1997. In February 1998, the couple traveled to Puerto Rico to meet with his daughter and other relatives, including his grandmother. Prior to leaving on vacation Ruiz was informed that PolyGram Records would soon be ready to record his next album, and he decided to hold a reunion with Urrutia, during this voyage. During this meeting, the singer negotiated the inclusion of a song that reflected the changes he had experienced – "Vuelvo a Nacer" written by Myriam Valentín (Urrutia's wife), who was a poet.

On February 13, 1998, Paterson mayor Martin G. Barnes hosted a ceremony for Ruiz, during which he gave him the key to the city. Ruiz completed a hectic schedule during the remainder of February and March, which was further complemented by a number of impromptu presentations. During this period he experienced a decline in health and increasing pain that interrupted some performances and delayed the date scheduled to begin work on his next album. His final appearance took place at the Crystal Nightclub in Houston on April 24, 1998, during which Ruiz made an effort to hide his discomfort. While in Florida, he reunited with his son for a day of leisure.

Recording of the new album began on May 3, 1998, in Santurce, Puerto Rico. Urrutia and Valentín had already completed preliminary arrangements and begun production with Peter Velásquez as songwriter. Ruiz began experiencing liver pain shortly after arriving, but pushed through it. He familiarized himself with the arrangements and began recording, beginning with the singles "Vuelvo a Nacer" (along Domingo Quiñones) and "Que Siga la Fiesta". However, he was not satisfied with the initial results, realizing that his voice was worsening. Ruiz worked through the pain for weeks, recording and making public appearances despite growing exhausted. Eventually, he convinced PolyGram that he could continue and recorded a version of "Vuelvo a Nacer" that satisfied him. After completing the video for the single, Ruiz's condition had worsened the rest of the production was cancelled along an homage to Héctor Lavoe. Following the promotional photos, the couple returned to New Jersey for medical follow up.

Later that week, his condition worsened and he was admitted to University Hospital's intensive care unit. News of his condition drew fans and the media to the hospital. Days later, his condition improved and Ruiz gave an interview to Paco Navarro of Mega 97.9 to address his health, thank fans for their support, and assert that he had faith, as the station organized a tribute. On June 17, 1998, he was sent home and remained stable until July 9, when he suffered complications. Within a day, his condition had improved considerably, allowing him to attend the homage. Ruiz was introduced to the audience following a speech, and walked onstage aided by his brother to cheers that lasted for minutes. Overcome by emotion, he thanked the audience and wished them blessings, before receiving a trophy. During the following week, Ruiz's condition deteriorated rapidly, and he was unable to care for himself.

On July 17, 1998, he was admitted to University Hospital and required assistance to do basic chores. Despite his condition, Ruiz tried to be amicable with both strangers, family, and acquaintances who visited daily. Ruiz was resigned to his situation and took refuge in his faith asking only that Salvador remain with him. Reporters were not allowed to see him but were updated indirectly. In Puerto Rico, news of his condition were released by PolyGram. Family members who lived abroad rushed to the hospital along with his children. During his final days, Ruiz was bedridden and immobilized and began making final arrangements.

In August, Ruiz decided to propose as his last request, which was accepted. An impromptu wedding with Salvador was planned to take place in his hospital room on August 7, but his condition forced it to be rescheduled for three days later. However, by the morning of August 9 his condition was critical and continued worsening until 11:40 p.m., when he died at the age of 43. Ruiz was survived by his children, grandchildren, his two brothers, and his wife.

== Funeral and final hit ==
Ruiz's death affected Puerto Rican and Latin American fans and expressions of grief and affection were widespread. His music received a lot of attention and was played in Latin American communities throughout the world. Residents of Paterson played it on boomboxes and the local store quickly sold all of his albums. A large ribbon was placed on Ruiz's former house at Grove Street in Paterson.

His body was placed in a golden coffin and a vigil began at Ortiz Funeral Home in the Bronx as he had planned. For three days thousands of fans paid their respects. His former booking agent, Carrie Sánchez, acknowledged that they had been preparing for this event since he first fell ill.

The Mass was large but ordinate, and mourners systematically passed through a set of barricades to give gifts, bring flowers, personal messages of appreciation, or to pray or pay homage to Ruiz in their own way. His coffin was covered by the flag of Puerto Rico, which became an ubiquitous gift brought by the masses visiting the funeral house. This demonstrated the impact that Ruiz had on Puerto Rican popular culture. Numerous Hispanics of other nationalities paid their respect as well. This outpouring of emotion, and the number of mourners surprised even those close to Ruiz, who wondered if the singer realized the reach of his work in life. His father was quoted as saying: "I knew my son was famous, but I never imagined he was so loved all over the world. He was much bigger than I thought he was."

The final day of his wake in this funeral house, his band fulfilled Ruiz's demand to provide a free show with Viti singing some of his brother's songs despite his grief. The following day, his body was taken to Newark Airport and transported to San Juan, along his family and friends. Back in Puerto Rico, it was transported to Mayagüez, where a similar public wake took place. In Puerto Rico, the process more closely resembled a baquiné, a local funerary rite usually reserved for children; instead of mourning, the person's life is celebrated and honored in joyous fashion; his body was received with plena (music and dance). A procession to Mayagüez began, with his family following the hearse carrying his body close by, and thousands of cars joining along the way. Pedestrians gathered along the road waving flags and, upon entering the municipality, his music was played at an event before thousands of attendees. Among the artists performing were: Tito Rojas, Ismael Miranda, Roberto Roena and his former bands La Solución and the Tommy Olivencia Orquesta. His body was placed in the Martínez Funeral Home, while the city mayor ordered flags to be flown at half mast out of respect. As the wake was opened to the public, the same reaction seen in New York repeated itself. The following day, his body was moved to the adjacent Mayagüez City Hall and received the honors reserved for a distinguished son; a public wake was held while more musicians played his repertoire.

Following this, Salvador visited the members of his family who lived in Puerto Rico, including his grandmother, to bid them farewell before returning to Paterson. There, Ruiz's final wake was held at the Minchin Funeral Home, attended by a similar numbers of public individuals and friends who lived in the area. The Minchin Funeral Home is now Michigan Memorial Funeral Home, located at 17 Michigan Avenue. Following the final rites led by a priest, the flag of Puerto Rico was placed over his coffin and a final procession took him to Fair Lawn Memorial Cemetery, where his family members from Puerto Rico joined those in New Jersey. Following a ceremony led by a Catholic priest, his body was buried.

A compilation containing "Vuelvo a Nacer" named Nacimiento y Recuerdos was released on August 25, 1998. Nacimiento y Recuerdos was certified platinum in the Latin field by the RIAA. The album debuted at number eight on Billboard's Hot Shot Debut and became Ruiz's biggest chart success. His final single going on to become a hit.

== Legacy ==
=== Immediate family ===
During the decade that followed his death, Viti decided to keep his brother's music alive, singing his hits as he grew successful throughout Latin America, particularly in Peru and Colombia. Among the songs that he reinterpreted were: "Desnúdate Mujer", "Viajera", "Que se mueran de envidia", "La Cura" and "La Rueda", which he would sing along with original singles. On June 9, 2007, the Copacabana nightclub in New York City hosted an homage to Ruiz, Ismael Rivera and Héctor Lavoe; Viti performed Ruiz's songs.

After his father's funeral, Frankie, Jr. returned to Miami and lived there until his adulthood. He noted the number of people present at the event, and the emotions and admiration expressed during it. He then comprehended the kind of influence that his father had on the masses and his impact on tropical music. Prior to this, Ruiz, Jr. assumed that his father was a successful, yet not necessarily influential, artist. This notion was further fueled by the fact that while they were together, Ruiz, Sr. behaved like any other father and did not reflect a grandiose aura. It was only after seeing the masses mourning, and singing his songs, that Ruiz, Jr. embraced his role as the son of someone of influential in the genre, and accepted the responsibility of continuing this legacy. Ultimately, this inspired him to follow in his father's footsteps and he began taking singing classes with the approval of Judith Ruiz. During this process, he studied the work of his father extensively, but focused on creating his own personal style instead of copying, but he did adopt the pseudonym of El Hijo de la Salsa in his father's honor.

On September 20, 2003, Ruiz, Jr. made his debut as a musician in an homage to his father that was held in Tenerife called Va por ti, Frankie, singing the single Puerto Rico and joining several groups in recreating his father's repertoire. He performed at this event along with: Lalo Rodríguez, Roberto Torres, José Alberto "El Canario", Luis Enrique, Servando y Florentino, Hansel, Luisito Carrión, Paquito Guzmán, Tommy Olivencia, Adalberto Santiago, Tito Allen, Son Iyá, and local artist Caco Senante. In 2012 Ruiz, Jr. returned to Puerto Rico as a singer and confessed to being flooded with emotions remembering his last visit when he was 12 years old. His local debut was scheduled for El Día Nacional de la Salsa, a long running salsa event that is organized by Z-93, the largest local event of its nature, held at Hiram Bithorn Stadium on March 25, 2012. Despite admitting to being nervous prior to the event due to the presence of established salsa performers, Ruiz, Jr. hoped that his long training would prove sufficient to please a public that admired his father. He also noted that since the event was an homage of sorts to his father, his repertoire included several of his classics including "Bailando", "La cura," "Puerto Rico", "Soy tuyo" and "Desnúdate mujer", as well as original songs.

=== Other singers ===
On August 24, 1999, Cheo Feliciano released his own tribute to Ruiz and other late salsa singers, Una voz... Mil recuerdos in which "El camionero" was reinterpreted. That same year, Nino Segarra released an album titled Romántico Salsero, which included that homage single, "Homenaje A Frankie Ruiz". Jerry Rivera, who met Ruiz when he was 13 years old, and whom he considered his idol, recorded a tribute album titled Canto a mi Idolo...Frankie Ruiz in 2003 with Ruiz's songs. The album cover contains a photo of Rivera and Ruiz taken by Rivera's father. The album received a nomination for Best Salsa Album at the 2004 Latin Grammy Awards. The video for the re-release of "Puerto Rico" was recorded in Mayagüez, as an homage. In 2004, another tribute album Va Por Ti, Frankie was released featuring various artists.

During the summer of 2003, four singles composed for Ruiz, but never recorded, resurfaced at the hands of Urrutia. The songs, first composed in 1997–1998 during Ruiz's late career comeback, were stored for the next 16 years following the singer's death. One of the main reasons behind this decision was that Urrutia felt unsatisfied with the potential candidates to record the singles and opted to wait for someone that he felt could accomplish the task. Eventually, the sound engineer discovered Charlie Cruz, then a young salsa singer from Naguabo, Puerto Rico, who happened to have been inspired by Ruiz and Lavoe. Despite being hand-selected, Cruz acknowledged that Ruiz had a unique style and that he had no interest in copying it, or replacing him, or becoming a contemporary version of Ruiz.

The singer attempted instead to record the themes using his own style as an homage, naming his production Huellas (meaning "footprints") in reference to the trailblazing done by Ruiz decades earlier. According to Cruz's own assessment, the single "Locos como yo" is the one that remains closest to its inspiration, with the others being "Me rindo", "Labios de púrpura", "Locos como yo" and "Hay que seguir palante" (in which Quiñones reprised his previous role. Urrutia was among those involved in its production, and the cover features an image of Cruz standing near Ruiz's grave and a note addressed to the late singer.

=== Compendiums and re-releases ===
In 1999, Universal Music Latino published a compendium titled La Leyenda de un Sonero, which remastered some of his previous work. Five years after his death, Universal Music Latino released Éxitos Eternos which includes the unfinished track "Que Siga la Fiesta". The song's length was extended by repeating its soneos and choruses and was remastered to improve its sound.

=== Other homages ===
The 1999 Puerto Rican Festival of Massachusetts was dedicated to Ruiz, and featured Viti as one of its invited performers. The event was highlighted by a parade where his hits, especially "Puerto Rico", were played over the speakers. Its organizer, focused the narrative of the festival on an anti-drug message, and noted in a later interview that Ruiz was an example of an unexpected death caused by a life of excess that had impacted him personally.

In 1999, the municipality of Mayagüez dedicated their yearly fiesta patronal to Ruiz; Viti was featured as guest singer. The municipal government later renamed an auditorium next to the Palacio de Recreación y Deportes in Ruiz's honor. The municipality of Carolina, Puerto Rico also held tribute shows as part of its Noches de Música Tropical series. At this event, figures like Elías Lopés and the La Mulenze orquesta performed some of his singles such as: "Esta cobardía", "La rueda", "Tú me vuelves loco", "Bailando", "Ironía" and "Mi libertad".

His was remembered by an event organized by SalSoul to commemorate its 50th anniversary. His single "Puerto Rico", reinterpreted by Juan Pablo Díaz and Issac Delgado, served as the cornerstone of Cuba y Puerto Rico son..., a cross-cultural project produced by Popular, Inc. which mostly centered around salsa.

== Style ==
While performing, Ruiz was a tenor, and his voice was described as decidedly juvenile sounding despite his physical age, something that he employed to execute a style that was regarded as "dazzling" and "passionate". However, he was protective of his voice, usually speaking in a low tone, and performing exercises to help him perform, leading to a dichotomy between his singing and conversation tones which surprised new acquaintances. His tracks have been described as reminiscent of a hybrid between popular music and modern salsa, with the percussion being prominently featured. The narrative was heavily focused in the daily life of Latinos, from their hardships to their traditions. He became known for his improvisational skills, something that he expressed with creativity and expressiveness through his voice, and which were described as capable of turning mediocre lyrics into a hit song.

Ruiz was not particularly motivated by money or wealth, but rather by a sense that it was his destiny to become a singer. He continued enjoying showmanship, and would dance to the rhythm to provide additional entertainment. The quality of his performances was commonly characterized by an empathy between him and his public, where Ruiz would attempt to entertain a lively audience to the point of exhaustion and anthropomorphized the masses as a single entity, his "Public".

== Discography ==
=== with Charlie López ===
- Charlie López y La Orquesta Nueva (1971)

=== with Orquesta La Solución ===
- Roberto Rivera y La Solución (1979)
- Orquesta La Solución (1980)

=== with Tommy Olivencia ===
- Un Triángulo de Triunfo (1981)
- Cantan: Frankie Ruiz y Carlos Alexis (also with Carlos Alexis) (1983)
- Celebrando Otro Aniversario (also with Héctor Tricoche) (1985)

=== Solo Albums ===
- Solista Pero No Solo (1985)
- Voy Pa' Encima (1987)
- En Vivo y... A Todo Color (1988)
- Más Grande Que Nunca (1989)
- Mi Libertad (1992)
- Puerto Rico, Soy Tuyo (1993)
- Mirandote (1994)
- Tranquilo (1996)

=== Live Albums ===
- Salsa Live Vol. 1 (with Tommy Olivencia) (2000)

=== Billboard Hot Latin Songs ===
- Desnúdate Mujer (#6)
- Me Acostumbré (#6)
- Ironía (#8)
- Mi Libertad (#10)
- Bailando (#10)
- Quiero Llenarte (#11)
- Tú Me Vuelves Loco (#11)
- Mirándote (#17)
- Vuelvo a Nacer (#20)
- En Época de Celo (#21)
- Tú Eres (#22)
- Háblame (#23)
- Tranquilo (#36)

== Awards and nominations ==
Year	Award	Category	Work	Result
1987	Billboard Magazine	Tropical/Salsa Artist of the Year	Himself	Won
1989	Premio Lo Nuestro Award	Tropical Salsa Artist of the Year	Himself	Nominated
1993	Premio Lo Nuestro Award	Male Artist of the Year, Tropical/Salsa	Himself	Nominated
1993	Premio Lo Nuestro Award	Tropical/Salsa Song of the Year	"Bailando"	Nominated
1997	Billboard Latin Music Award	Tropical/Salsa Song of the Year	"Ironía	Won
2021	Billboard Latin Music Award	Tropical Album of the Year	The Greatest Salsa Ever, Vol. 1	Nominated
2024	Billboard Latin Music Award	Tropical Song of the Year	"Otra Noche Más" (with Victor Manuelle)	Nominated
2025	Premio Lo Nuestro Award	Tropical Song of the Year	"Otra Noche Más" (with Victor Manuelle)	Nominated

== See also ==
- List of Puerto Ricans
- Salsa Romantica
