= Lourdes Robles =

Puerto Rican recording artist, singer

- Origin: San Juan, Puerto Rico
- Genres: Latin Ballad, Pop, rock, salsa, Gospel
- Occupations: Singer-songwriter, actress, tv host
- Labels: Sony (CBS), PolyGram, Latin World Entertainment Group, G&A Productions
- Website: lourdesrobles.com

Lourdes Robles is a singer-songwriter and actress, born in San Juan, Puerto Rico. Her career started in the early 1980s as part of duo Lourdes y Carlos, releasing two albums. The duo split and Robles began a solo career, acting in "Barrio Cuatro Calles" and "Generaciones", along Puerto-Rican performer Chayanne. She also performed in some musical productions, including Hello, Dolly!, Into the Woods, and The Fantasticks.

At the Festival del Sol in 1985 held in Miami, Florida, Robles received an award for her song "No Soy Distinta". Sponsored by Danny Rivera, the singer recorded two songs that attracted the attention of the record label Sony Music. In 1989, her single "Corazón en Blanco", a pop song, became her first to chart in the United States, peaking at number 15. The next year, Robles released the album Imágenes, produced by Rudy Pérez and Ricardo Eddy. This album peaked at number 9 in the Billboard Top Latin Albums chart and yielded her first number-one single "Abrázame Fuerte". Her duet with Nicaraguan singer Luis Enrique, "Gracias a Tu Amor", also became a hit, peaking at number two. "Miedo", "Que Lástima" and "Es Él" were released as singles. Robles was awarded with a Gold album for Imágenes.

In 1992 Robles was asked to represent the new generation of performers at the "Fifth Anniversary of the Encounter with the New World", sharing the stage with popular salsa singers, Gilberto Santa Rosa, Andy Montañez, Carmita Jiménez, Danny Rivera, Chucho Avellanet and José Juan Tañón. Hey Jude: Tributo a Los Beatles was released in 1995. This compilation album included 13 songs originally performed by The Beatles. Robles performed a Spanish version of the song "The Long and Winding Road".

Robles parted ways with Sony Music in 1999, signing a recording contract with PolyGram. The first album with this label, Cielo de Acuarela, recorded in New York City, Spain and Santo Domingo, with a blend of tropical and pop music. The following year, a song titled "Lo Odio", produced by Guillermo Torres, was released. In May 2002, Billboard magazine announced that a new album by Robles, under the Latin World Entertainment Group—a Puerto-Rican record label of recent creation, was "under way". Sensaciones was released in 2002.

In 2010, a cover album with songs previously recorded by Juanes, Juan Luis Guerra, Ricardo Montaner, Franco De Vita, La 5ª Estación, Maná and Alejandro Fernández, titled Es Algo Más was unveiled. About this album, Robles said that it would appeal to people "who are fans of her work and people who are not."

== Discography ==
- Lourdes Robles (1985)
1. No Soy Distinta
2. Te Quiero Como Amigo
3. Mamá
4. Gracias
5. Hasta Ahora
6. Tú Llegaste
7. Bailando Samba
8. Como Todos los Días
- Tentación (1988)
1. Hoy Yo No Quiero Estar Sola
2. Amor a Tiempo Completo
3. Dime
4. Noche Especial
5. Tentación
6. Estoy Enamorada
7. Vas a Quedarte Sólo
8. Como un Milagro
- Noche Tras Noche (1989)
1. Haz una Hoguera
2. Yo No Sabía
3. Nos Quedamos Tú y Yo
4. Noche Tras Noche
5. Vida
6. Corazón en Blanco
7. Párate al Stop
8. Es Una Linda Tarde
- Imágenes (1990)
1. Abrázame Fuerte
2. Es El
3. Chin Chin (Brindemos Por Nosotros)
4. Gracias a Tu Amor (Duo con Luis Enrique)
5. Miedo
6. Que Lástima
7. Dime Como Llego a Ti
8. La Nota Ideal
9. Ni Tú Ni Yo
- Definitivamente (1991)
1. Sola
2. A Cara o Cruz
3. Todo Me Habla de Ti
4. Pero Me Acuerdo de Ti
5. Seré Toda Para Ti (I'm Your Baby Tonight)
6. Definitivamente
7. Soñando Contigo
8. Punto de Partida
9. Confío en Ti
10. Concierto Para Dos
- Amaneciendo en Ti (1993)
1. Donde Se Ha Ido Tu Amor
2. Se Te Nota
3. Amaneciendo en Ti
4. Baila con la Noche (Dancing in the Sunshine)
5. Lo Amo
6. Déjalo Ir Conmigo
7. Busco el Amor
8. Déjame Sentirte
9. Débil el Alma
10. Si Te Vas
- Soy Quien Soy (1996)
1. Me Déjare Llorar
2. Bendita Nostalgia
3. Muchacha
4. Yo Te Quiero
5. Ni Tú Ni Nadie
6. Sin Dirección
7. Celos
8. Soy Quien Soy
9. Es Por Ti
10. Desconocida
- Cielo de Acuarela (1998)
1. Así Es Mi Isla
2. Con las Cosas del Querer
3. Mi Jardín
4. Bangalí, Bangalá
5. Candela Pa' los Pies
6. Si Pudieras Amarme
7. Ese Hombre Que Tanto Amo Yo
8. De Que Calor
9. Siempre
10. Guajiro Viejo
11. Pa' los Pesares
12. Tú
- Tuya (2000)
1. Lo Odio
2. Tuya
3. Vete Ya
4. Alguien Como Tú
5. Sola
6. Tu Recuerdo
7. No Puedo
8. Mañana
9. Tómame
10. Si No Estas
- Sensaciones (2003)
1. Ayúdame
2. Que Dios Se Apiade de Mí
3. Lo Daría Todo
4. Boom, Boom
5. Y Entonces
6. Me Trae la Cabeza
7. Cuesta Arriba
8. No Sé Que Haria Sin Ti
9. No Te Podré Olvidar
10. Muerdo Tu Boda
11. Que Dios Se Apiade de Mí (Versión Salsa)
- Es Algo Más (2010)
1. Como Aquel Viejo Bolero
2. Bendita la Luz
3. Sigo Siendo Reina
4. Me Dediqué a Perderte
5. Algo Más
6. Que Me Des Tú Cariño
7. Me Late
8. Para Tu Amor
9. Yo Puedo Hacer
10. Entre en Mi Vida
11. Te Veo Venir Soledad
