= 1987 in Latin music =

This is a list of notable events in Latin music (music from the Spanish- and Portuguese-speaking areas of Latin America, Latin Europe, and the United States) that took place in 1987.

== Events ==
- February 24 – The 29th Annual Grammy Awards are held at The Shrine Auditorium in Los Angeles, California.:
  - José Feliciano wins the Grammy Award for Best Latin Pop Performance for "Le Lo Lai".
  - Flaco Jiménez wins the Grammy Award for Best Mexican/Mexican-American Performance for Ay Te Dejo en San Antonio y Más!.
  - Rubén Blades wins the Grammy Award for Best Tropical Latin Performance for Escenas.

== Number-ones albums and singles by country ==
- List of number-one albums of 1987 (Spain)
- List of number-one singles of 1987 (Spain)
- List of number-one Billboard Latin Pop Albums of 1987
- List of number-one Billboard Regional Mexican Albums of 1987
- List of number-one Billboard Tropical Albums of 1987
- List of number-one Billboard Top Latin Songs of 1987

== Awards ==
- 1987 Tejano Music Awards

== Albums released ==
=== First-quarter ===
==== January ====
| Day | Title | Artist | Genre(s) | Singles | Label |
|---|---|---|---|---|---|
| 1 | La Cartita | Fernando Villalona | | | |
| 5 | Alto Al Fuego | Alux Nahual | Alternative Rock, Rock & Roll | | Discos de Centroamérica |

=== Second-quarter ===
==== June ====
| Day | Title | Artist | Genre(s) | Singles | Label |
|---|---|---|---|---|---|
| 30 | La Bamba | Various artists | Soundtrack, Rock & Roll, Pop rock | | Slash, Warner Bros. Records, Slas, Warner Bros. Records |

=== Third-quarter ===
==== August ====
| Day | Title | Artist | Genre(s) | Singles | Label |
|---|---|---|---|---|---|
| 21 | Gipsy Kings | Gipsy Kings | Flamenco | "Bamboleo" "Un Amor" "Quiero Saber" | P.E.M., P.E.M. |

=== Fourth-quarter ===
==== November ====
| Day | Title | Artist | Genre(s) | Singles | Label |
|---|---|---|---|---|---|
| 17 | Sigo Atrevido | Eddie Santiago | Salsa | | Top Hits, TH-Rodven |
| 24 | Canciones de Mi Padre | Linda Ronstadt | Ranchera, Corrido, Mariachi | "For a Love" "There Are Some Eyes" "You, Only You" | Asylum Records |

=== Dates Unknown ===
| Title | Artist | Genre(s) | Singles | Label |
|---|---|---|---|---|
| Ofrenda | Danny Rivera | Bolero | | Discos DNA |
| Versátil y Temperamental | Sophy | Ballad, Merengue | | Velvet |
| La Suavecita | Liberación | | | |
| Oiga | Joan Sebastian | Ballad | | Musart |
| All I Could Do Was Cry | La Sombra | | | Freddie Records |
| Corazón Vacío | Los Yonic's | Conjunto, Ballad | | Profono Internacional, Inc. |
| No Quiero Que Me Engañes | Los Freddy's | Ballad | | Profono Internacional, Inc. |
| Voy pa' encima | Frankie Ruiz | Salsa, Guaguanco | | TH-Rodven, TH-Roven, Top Hits |
| Vida, Canción y Suerte | Wilfrido Vargas | Merengue | | Karen Records |
| El Higado | Tavín Pumarejo | | | |
| Mejor Acompañado Que Nunca | Andy Montañez | Salsa, Guaguanco | | Top Hits, Top Hits |
| Especial No. 5 | Willie Colón | Salsa, Son | | Sonotone Latin Records |
| Será Que Estoy Soñando | Basilio | Vocal, Ballad | | BMS Records |
| Me Volvi a Acordar de Ti | Los Bukis | Ballad | | Sono-Rodven |
| Por el Buen Camino | Ismael Miranda | Salsa | | IM Records |
| Aquí Se Puede | Ray Barretto | Salsa, Jazz-Funk, Latin Jazz | | Fania Records |
| 7 | Timbiriche | Pop rock, Latin Pop | | Melody Internacional |
| Soy Como Quiero Ser | Luis Miguel | Pop rock, Ballad | | WEA Latina |
| Luz y Sombra | Flans | Europop, Synth-Pop | | Melody |
| Que País É Este | Legião Urbana | Pop rock, Punk, Alternative Rock | "Que País É Este "Tédio (Com Um T Bem Grande Pra Você" "Faroeste Caboclo" | EMI, EMI |
| Mírame | María Conchita Alonso | Pop rock | | A&M Records |
| Nunca Te Diré Adiós | Yolandita Monge | | | |
| Mi Canción es Paz | Daniel Rivera | | | |
| Lunna | Lunna | | | AyM Discos |
| Soy Así | José José | Ballad | | Ariola |
| Ser Boricua es un Honor | José Nogueras | | | Musica Estival |
| Tu Inmenso Amor | José Feliciano | | | EMI |
| Paraiso Perdido | Wilkins | | | WEA Latina |
| Sueños de Libertad | José Luis Perales | | | |
| Amar o Morir | Danny Rivera | | | Discos DNA |
| Evocando el ayer | Julio Angel y Jose Luis Monero | | | Ji Records |
| Un hombre solo | Julio Iglesias | Bolero, Easy Listening, Europop | | Discos CBS International, Discos CBS International |
| ¿Dónde Estás Amor? | Rocío Jurado | | | EMI |
| Soy | Franco | Ballad | | Peerless |
| Tongoneaito | Mister Chivo | | | |
| Super Bronco | Bronco | Cumbia, Ballad, Merengue | | Ariola |
| La Duda | Pegasso del Pollo Estevan | | | |
| La coloreteada | Los Mier | Ballad, Cumbia | | Ariola |
| Petalos y Espinas | Los Yonic's | | | |
| Nuevas Versiones | Los Brios | | | |
| Entrega Total | Rocío Banquells | Mariachi | | WEA |
| Será el Ángel | Lisa Lopez | Ballad | | Musart |
| De Nuevo | Los Sagitarios | Conjunto | | Luna International |
| Te Ves Criminal | Carlos y José | Corrido, Ranchera, Cumbia | | Freddie Records |
| Cruz de Madera | Los Huracanes del Norte | | | Garmex Records |
| Sabor y Sentimiento | Cheo Feliciano | Salsa, Bolero | | Coche Records Inc. |
| El Cominezo del Camino... | Andy y Harold Montañez | | | |
| Motivos de Mi Tierra | Ismael Miranda | Salsa, Holiday | | Velvet |
| Con Sabor Navideño | Conjunto Quisqueya | Merengue, Holiday | | Viva Records |
| Canta: Tito Rojas | Puerto Rican Power | Salsa | | Sonotone Latin Records |
| La Salsa Soy Yo | Oscar D'León | Salsa, Cha-Cha | | TH-Rodven |
| Estoy Como Nunca | Ray De La Paz | Salsa | | BC Records |
| Alegrando al Mundo | Orquesta Imnesidad | | | |
| A Tiempo Completo | Costa Brava | Salsa, Merengue | | Profono Internacional, Inc. |
| A Man of Music | Willie Rosario | Salsa, Guaguanco | | Bronco |
| La Música | Wilfrido Vargas | Merengue | | Sonotone, Palma Pro, Sonotone Latin Records |
| Caribbean Express | Caribbean Express | Salsa | | A&M Records |
| Strikes Back | Héctor Lavoe | Salsa | "Loco" "Como No Voy a Llorar" | Fania Records |
| The Winners | Celia Cruz and Willie Colón | Funk, Guaguanco, Guaracha, Salsa | | Vaya Records, Vaya Records |
| Celebración | Los Diablos | | | CBS |
| Ricardo Montaner | Ricardo Montaner | Ballad | | TH-Rodven Records, Inc. |
| Hasta Que Te Perdí | Ramón Ayala | Norteno, Ranchera | | Freddie Records |
| Vamos a Gozar | Freddie Kenton | | | |
| Riquiti | Oscar D'León | Salsa | | TH-Rodven |
| Back to Work | La Sonora Ponceña | Salsa, Descarga, Guajira, Merengue | | Inca Records |
| Fuerza Noble | Gabino Pampino | | | |
| A La Moderna | Grupo Agua Prieta | | | |
| A Fuego Lento | Grupo El Tiempo | | | |
| Con Fuerza! | Jossie Esteban y la Patrulla 15 | Merengue | | Top Ten Hits |
| Viva Centro América | Various Artists | Cumbia | | Sonotone |

== Best-selling records ==
=== Best-selling albums ===
The following is a list of the top 5 best-selling Latin albums of 1987 in the United States divided into the categories of Latin pop, Regional Mexican, and Tropical/salsa, according to Billboard.

| Category | Rank | Album | Artist |
|---|---|---|---|
| Latin pop | 1 | Siempre Contigo | José José |
| Latin pop | 2 | Pensamientos | Juan Gabriel |
| Latin pop | 3 | Lo Bello y lo Prohibido | Braulio |
| Latin pop | 4 | Solo | Emmanuel |
| Latin pop | 5 | Te Amaré | José Feliciano |
| Regional Mexican | 1 | Me Volvi a Acordar de Ti | Los Bukis |
| Regional Mexican | 2 | Gracias!... América... Sin Fronteras | Los Tigres del Norte |
| Regional Mexican | 3 | Timeless | Little Joe |
| Regional Mexican | 4 | Hoy Platiqué con Mi Gallo | Vicente Fernández |
| Regional Mexican | 5 | Corazón Vacío | Los Yonics |
| Tropical/Salsa | 1 | Atrevido y Diferente | Eddie Santiago |
| Tropical/Salsa | 2 | Y Su Pueblo | El Gran Combo de Puerto Rico |
| Tropical/Salsa | 3 | Mejor Acompanado Que Nunca | Andy Montañez |
| Tropical/Salsa | 4 | Voy pa' encima | Frankie Ruiz |
| Tropical/Salsa | 5 | Elegantemente Criollo | Roberto Torres |

=== Best-performing songs ===
The following is a list of the top 10 best-performing Latin songs in the United States in 1987, according to Billboard.

| Rank | Single | Artist |
|---|---|---|
| 1 | "De Mí Enamórate" | Daniela Romo |
| 2 | "En Bancarrota" | Braulio García |
| 3 | "Tu Carcel" | Los Bukis |
| 4 | "Hasta Que Te Conocí" | Juan Gabriel |
| 5 | "Es Mi Mujer" | Emmanuel |
| 6 | "El Pecado" | Amanda Miguel |
| 7 | "Lo Mejor de Tu Vida" | Julio Iglesias |
| 8 | "Doce Rosas" | Lorenzo Antonio |
| 9 | "Tu Dama de Hierro" | Marisela |
| 10 | "¿Y Quién Puede Ser?" | José José |

== Births ==
- September 18 – Luísa Sobral, Portuguese singer and songwriter

== Deaths ==
- November 28 – Víctor Yturbe, Mexican ballad singer, 51 (shot)
- December 22 – José do Patrocínio Oliveira, Brazilian carioca musician, 83
