= 1988 in Latin music =

This is a list of notable events in Latin music (music from the Spanish- and Portuguese-speaking areas of Latin America, Latin Europe, and the United States) that took place in 1988.

== Events ==
- March 2 – The 30th Annual Grammy Awards are held at The Radio City Music Hall in New York City:
  - Julio Iglesias wins the Grammy Award for Best Latin Pop Performance for Un Hombre Solo.
  - Los Tigres del Norte wins the Grammy Award for Best Mexican/Mexican-American Performance for Gracias!... América... Sin Fronteras.
  - Eddie Palmieri wins the Grammy Award for Best Tropical Latin Performance for La Verdad/The Truth.

== Number-ones albums and singles by country ==
- List of number-one albums of 1988 (Spain)
- List of number-one singles of 1988 (Spain)
- List of number-one Billboard Latin Pop Albums of 1988
- List of number-one Billboard Regional Mexican Albums of 1988
- List of number-one Billboard Tropical Albums of 1988
- List of number-one Billboard Top Latin Songs of 1988

== Awards ==
- 1988 Tejano Music Awards
- 1988 Sharp Brazilian Music Awards

== Albums released ==
=== August ===
Day	Title	Artist	Genre(s)	Singles	Label
28	Caifanes	Caifanes	Alternative Rock		Ariola, RCA

=== September ===
Day	Title	Artist	Genre(s)	Singles	Label
Unknown Date	La Pistola y El Corazón	Los Lobos	Norteno, Son, Ranchera, Mariachi	"La Guacamaya" "Las Amarillas" "La Pistola y el Corazón"	Slash, Warner Bros. Records, Slash, Warner Bros. Records

=== Dates unknown ===
Title	Artist	Genre(s)	Singles	Label
Con Tambora	Joan Sebastian	Ranchera, Banda		Musart Premier, Musart
Aire	Yuri	Ballad		EMI Mexico
Si Me Recuerdas	Los Bukis	Ballad		Sono-Rodven
La Luna Será La Luna	Beatriz Adriana	Ballad, Ranchera		Profono Internacional, Inc.
Desde Andalucía	Isabel Pantoja	Ballad		RCA International
Las apariencias engañan	Raphael	Ballad		Discos CBS International
Antecedente	Rubén Blades	Salsa, Bolero, Cha-Cha, Rumba		Elektra, Elektra
Isla del Sol	Yuri	Italo-Disco, Latin, Synth-Pop		Discos CBS International
Como Tu Mujer	Rocío Dúrcal	Ballad	"Como Tu Mujer"	Ariola
Tierra de Nadie	Ana Gabriel	Vocal, Romantic, Ballad		Discos CBS International
Chayanne (1988)	Chayanne	Afro-Cuban, Ballad		Discos CBS International
Busca una Mujer	Luis Miguel	Pop rock, Ballad		WEA
Al Norte del Sur	Franco De Vita	Ballad		Columbia, Sonografica
Musica Criolla Todo el Ano	José Nogueras			
La Espera	José Luis Perales	Ballad		CBS
Apasianado	Glenn Monroig			
De Corazón a Corazón	Eydie Gormé	Bolero, Latin Pop		Discos CBS International
El Hombre Que Yo Amo	Caridad Canelón	Ballad		Sonotone Latin Records
Non Stop	Julio Iglesias	Vocal, Ballad		Columbia, Columbia
Debo Hacerlo	Juan Gabriel	Ballad, Bolero, Mariachi, Ranchera		Ariola
Con Todos Los Sentidos	Braulio	Vocal, Ballad		Discos CBS International
Ni Por Mil Punados De Oro	Xelencia			Cara
Straight From the Heart	La Mafia			
Un Golpe Más	Bronco	Cumbia, Norteno, Ballad		Fonovisa
Los Ídolos del Pueblo	Los Caminantes	Conjunto		Luna International
La Guerra de las Sonoras	Sonora Santanera and La Sonora Dinamita			
The Party is Here	Fandango USA			
Un Puño de Tierra	Ramón Ayala & Bravos del Norte	Norteno, Ranchera		Freddie Records
Que Tristeza	Los Humildes	Ranchera, Cumbia, Ballad		Fonovisa
Esclavo y Rey	Grupo Vennus	Ballad, Conjunto		Tesoro Records
El Caballo...una Leyenda	Johnny Ventura	Merengue		Discos CBS International, Discos CBS International
Ritmo en el Corazón	Celia Cruz and Ray Barretto	Salsa, Cha-Cha, Guaracha, Guaguanco, Latin Jazz		Fania Records
De Amor y Salsa	Gilberto Santa Rosa	Salsa, Guaguanco		Combo Records, Combo Records
Con Más Empuje	Willie Berrios	Merengue		Sonotone
Toco Madera	Orquesta La Mulenze			
Bobby Valentín	Bobby Valentín	Salsa, Guaguanco		Bronco
Orgullo de Puerto Rico	Costa Brava	Salsa		Hitt Makers
Más Que Atrevido	Conjunto Chaney	Salsa		Hitt Makers
No es Suficiente	José Medina y Su Orquesta			
Ricardo Montaner, Vol. 2	Ricardo Montaner			
Alma Gemela	Flans	Ballad, Chanson, Europop		Melody Platino Especial, Melody Platino Especial
Mister E	Pete Escovedo	Afro-Cuban, Fusion, Salsa		Crossover Records
Flaco's Amigos	Flaco Jiménez	Tejano	"La Tumba Sera el Final" "Lucerito" "Jennette"	Arhoolie Records
Ídolos del Pueblo	Los Tigres del Norte	Corrido, Ranchera, Cumbia		Fonovisa Records
Vida Nueva	Los Freddy's			EMI Pope
Debo Hacerlo	Juan Gabriel	Ballad, Bolero, Mariachi, Ranchera		Ariola
Mascarada	Joan Sebastian	Ballad		Internacional, Codiscos
Romántico y Sabroso	El Gran Combo de Puerto Rico	Salsa		Combo Records
El Jeque	Tommy Olivencia	Guaguanco, Salsa		TH-Rodven, TH-Rodven
No Me Olvidarás	José Javier Solís	Ballad		Profono Internacional, Inc.
Porque Estás Enamorada	Los Bríos	Ballad		Musivisa
Más Que Atrevido	¡Conjunto Chaney!	Salsa		Hitt Makers
Psicoacústica	Ira!	Pop rock		WEA, WEA, WEA

== Best-selling records ==
=== Best-selling albums ===
The following is a list of the top 5 best-selling Latin albums of 1988 in the United States divided into the categories of Latin pop, Regional Mexican, and Tropical/salsa, according to Billboard.

Category	Rank	Album	Artist
Latin pop	1	Soy Así	José José
Latin pop	2	Señor Corazón	José Luis Rodríguez
Latin pop	3	Un Hombre Solo	Julio Iglesias
Latin pop	4	Entre Lunas	Emmanuel
Latin pop	5	Amor Libre: 12 Grandes Exitos	Camilo Sesto
Regional Mexican	1	Si Me Recuerdas	Los Bukis
Regional Mexican	2	Petalos y Espinas	Los Yonics
Regional Mexican	3	Me Volvi a Acordar de Ti	Los Bukis
Regional Mexican	4	Canciones de Mi Padre	Linda Ronstadt
Regional Mexican	5	Super Bronco	Bronco
Tropical/Salsa	1	Sigo Atrevido	Eddie Santiago
Tropical/Salsa	2	Un Nuevo Despertar	Lalo Rodríguez
Tropical/Salsa	3	Historia Musical de Frankie Ruiz	Frankie Ruiz
Tropical/Salsa	4	El Baile	Wilfrido Vargas
Tropical/Salsa	5	El Original y el Unico	Willie Gonzalez

=== Best-performing songs ===
The following is a list of the top 10 best-performing Latin songs in the United States in 1988, according to Billboard.

Rank	Single	Artist
1	"Ay Amor"	Ana Gabriel
2	"Qué Te Pasa"	Yuri
3	"Y Tú También Llorarás"	José Luis Rodríguez "El Puma"
4	"María"	Franco
5	"Debo Hacerlo"	Juan Gabriel
6	"Toco Madera"	Raphael
7	"Soy Así"	José José
8	"Un Alma en Pena"	Lucía Méndez
9	"La Ultima Luna"	Emmanuel
10	"Negra"	Roberto Carlos

== Deaths ==
- January 11 – Janires, Brazilian singer-songwriter, 34 (bus accident)
- February 3 – Radamés Gnattali, Brazilian composer, 81
- July 18 – Joly Braga Santos, Portuguese composer and conductor, 64
- December 26 – Pablo Sorozábal, Spanish composer, 91
