= 1986 in Latin music =

This is a list of notable events in Latin music (music from the Spanish- and Portuguese-speaking areas of Latin America, Latin Europe, and the United States) that took place in 1986.

== Events ==
- February 24 – The 28th Annual Grammy Awards are held at The Shrine Auditorium in Los Angeles, California.:
  - Lani Hall wins the Grammy Award for Best Latin Pop Performance for Es Facil Amar.
  - Vikki Carr wins the Grammy Award for Best Mexican/Mexican-American Performance for Simplemente Mujer.
  - Tito Puente wins the Grammy Award for Best Tropical Latin Performance for Mambo Diablo.
- October 4 – Billboard establishes the Hot Latin 50 chart (now known as the Hot Latin Songs chart). On the printed publication "Yo No Sé Qué Me Pasó" by Juan Gabriel is the first number-one song on the chart. On the Billboard electronic database however, "La Guirnalda" by Rocío Dúrcal, is the first number one song on the week ending 6 September 1986.
- November 15 – The 15th OTI Festival, held at the Municipal Theatre in Santiago, Chile, is won by "Todos", written by Vilma Planas and performed by Dámaris Carbaugh, Miguel Ángel Guerra, and Eduardo Fabián, representing the United States.

== Number-one albums and singles by country ==
- List of number-one albums of 1986 (Spain)
- List of number-one singles of 1986 (Spain)
- List of number-one Billboard Latin Pop Albums of 1986
- List of number-one Billboard Regional Mexican Albums of 1986
- List of number-one Billboard Tropical Albums of 1986
- List of number-one Billboard Top Latin Songs of 1986

== Awards ==
- 1986 Tejano Music Awards

== Albums released ==
=== Third quarter ===
==== September ====
| Day | Title | Artist | Genre(s) | Singles | Label |
|---|---|---|---|---|---|
| Unknown Day | Tango: Zero Hour | Astor Piazzolla and Quinteto Nuevo Tango | Contemporary jazz, Tango | "Tanguedia III" "Milonga del Angel" "Michelangelo '70" | American Clave |

=== Unknown date ===
| Title | Artist | Genre(s) | Singles | Label |
|---|---|---|---|---|
| Brasil '86 | Sérgio Mendes | Jazz, soft rock | "What Do We Mean to Each Other" | A&M |
| Dois | Legião Urbana | Pop rock, Alternative rock, Folk rock, Post-Punk | "Quase Sem Querer" "Tempo Perdido" "Andrea Doria" | EMI |
| Castígame | Lucía Méndez | | | Ariola |
| Fantasía | Franco De Vita | Ballad | | Sonotone Latin Records |
| El Hombre de Mi Vida | Angélica María | Ballad | | RCA Victor |
| 20 Millas | Flans | Synth-Pop, Pop rock, Ballad | | Melody Internacional |
| Desnudo | Emmanuel | Ballad, Pop rock | | RCA International |
| Parrandas Navideñas | Julio Angel | Christmas | | Ji Records |
| Lo Bello y lo Prohibido | Braulio | | | Discos CBS International |
| Mujer de todos, Mujer de nadie | Daniela Romo | Europop, Ballad | | Odeon |
| Tú Sin Mí | Ednita Nazario | | | Melody Internacional |
| Siempre Contigo | José José | Ballad | | Ariola |
| Te Amaré | José Feliciano | | | RCA International |
| Yo Canto | Franco | | | Peerless |
| Refrescante | Menudo | Pop rock | | RCA International |
| Atrévete | Caridad Canelón | Vocal | | Sonotone Latin Records |
| Pensamientos | Juan Gabriel | Mariachi, Vocal, Ballad | | Ariola |
| Siempre | Rocío Dúrcal | Ballad, Mariachi | | Ariola |
| Te Cantaré | Jorge Muñiz | | | RCA |
| Fuga | Lissette | Vocal | | Discos CBS International |
| Ensuenos | Julio Angel | Bolero | | Top Ten Hits |
| Estoy Celoso | Diego Verdaguer | Ballad, Europop | | Profono Internacional, Inc. |
| No. 16, Part 2 | Mazz | | | |
| Hoy Platiqué con Mi Gallo | Vicente Fernández | Ranchera, Bolero | | Discos CBS International |
| Gracias!... América... Sin Fronteras | Los Tigres del Norte | Norteño, Ranchera | "America" "La Puerta Negra" | FonoVisa, Inc. |
| Diferente | Los Plebeyos | | | |
| No Me Dejes Escapar | Tinta Blanca | | | |
| Canción de un Preso | Carlos y José | Norteno, Ranchera, Corrido | | Freddie Records |
| Yerba, polvo y piomo | Los Cadetes de Linares | | | |
| Debajo de Aqueil Árbol | Ramón Ayala y sus Bravos del Norte | | | |
| Con Banda | Antonio Aguilar | | | |
| Alla Nos Vemos en México | Agua Prieta | | | |
| El Mejor de Todos | Pedrito Fernández | Ranchera | | CBS |
| De Guanajuato...Para America! | Los Caminantes | Ballad | | Rocio |
| La Candelosa | Binomio De Oro De America | | | |
| El Brillo De Oro Negro Y Su Orquesta | Oro Negro Y Su Orquesta | Merengue, Salsa | | Sonolux |
| Oficial y Ahora... Con Tremenda Pinta | Marvin Santiago | Salsa | | Top Hits |
| Acariciame | Jossie Esteban y la Patrulla 15 | Merengue | | Top Ten Hits |
| The New York Band | The New York Band | | | |
| Good Vibrations | Gilberto Santa Rosa | Salsa | | Combo Records |
| Tropical | Hansel & Raul | Salsa, Charanga | | RCA International |
| Atrevido y diferente | Eddie Santiago | Salsa | | Top Hits |
| Special Delivery | Milly y los Vecinos | | | |
| Dance It/¡Bailalo! | Bonny Cepeda | Merengue | | RCA International |
| Viva la Charanga | Fania All-Stars | Afro-Cuban, Charanga, Guajira, Guaracha, Bolero, Cha-Cha, Son Montuno | | Fania Records |
| Manzanizate | La Gran Manzana | Merengue | | Toro Records |
| Elegantemente Criollo | Roberto Torres | Son Montuno, Salsa | | SAR Records |
| Carlos David Y Orquesta Liberación | Carlos David Y Orquesta Liveracion | Merengue | | Karen Records, Karen Records |
| Sabor con Clase | Louie Ramírez & Ray de la Paz | Salsa, Bolero | | Caiman Records, Caiman Records |
| Este Es... | Roberto Lugo | Salsa | | Sonotone Latin Records |
| Ay Te Dejo en San Antonio y Más! | Flaco Jiménez | Ranchera, Danza, Tejano | "Ay Te Dejo en San Antonio" "Juarez" "Un Viejo Amor" | Arhoolie Records |
| Y... Zas! | Rafael Buendia | | | |
| Unidos Cantemos | Salvador Torres | | | |
| Nueva Cosecha | Willie Rosario | Salsa | | Bronco |
| Cada Día Me Acuerdo Más de Ti | Dyango | Bolero, Ballad | | Odeon |
| Y Su Pueblo | El Gran Combo de Puerto Rico | Salsa | | Combo Records |
| Roberto Carlos '86 | Roberto Carlos | MPB, Ballad | | Discos CBS International |
| Sangre Latina | Chayanne | Ballad, Pop rock | | Ariola |
| Corridos Al Estilo de Los Humildes | Los Humildes | Corrido | | Profono Internacional, Inc. |
| In Tradition | Luis "Perico" Ortiz, Domingo Quinones | Salsa, Guaracha, Latin Jazz, Cha-Cha | | Perico Records, Perico Records |
| Cabeça Dinossauro | Titãs | Pop rock, Punk | | WEA, WEA |
| Selvagem? | Os Paralamas do Sucesso | MPB, Dub, Ska | | EMI |
| Puedes ser tú | Miki González | | | |
| Pateando piedras | Los Prisioneros | New Wave | | WEA |
| ¡Viva Chile! | Electrodomésticos | Post-Punk | | EMI |
| Música Para Los Perros | Pro Rock Ensamble | Folk Rock, Jazz-Rock, Fusion | | Discos Elio |
| Corazón Errante | Estela Núñez | Ballad | | Ariola |
| Agua de Luna | Rubén Blades | Salsa, Latin Jazz | "Ojos de Perro Azul" | Elektra, Elektra |
| Quítate La Máscara | Rigo Tovar | Cumbia | | Melody Internacional |

== Best-selling albums ==
The following is a list of the top 5 best-selling Latin albums of 1986 in the United States divided into the categories of Latin pop, Regional Mexican, and Tropical/salsa, according to Billboard.

| Category | Rank | Album | Artist |
|---|---|---|---|
| Latin pop | 1 | Promesas | José José |
| Latin pop | 2 | Libra | Julio Iglesias |
| Latin pop | 3 | Complemente Tuya | Marisela |
| Latin pop | 4 | Por Amor al Arte | Dyango |
| Latin pop | 5 | Ya Soy Tuyo | José Feliciano |
| Regional Mexican | 1 | A Donde Vas | Los Bukis |
| Regional Mexican | 2 | Los Yonic's | Los Yonic's |
| Regional Mexican | 3 | Rumores | Joan Sebastian |
| Regional Mexican | 4 | El Otro Mexico | Los Tigres del Norte |
| Regional Mexican | 5 | Por Que Me Haces Sufrir | Los Bondadosos |
| Tropical/Salsa | 1 | Solista pero no solo | Frankie Ruiz |
| Tropical/Salsa | 2 | La Magia De... | Hansel & Raul |
| Tropical/Salsa | 3 | La Medicina | Wilfrido Vargas |
| Tropical/Salsa | 4 | Nuestra Música | El Gran Combo de Puerto Rico |
| Tropical/Salsa | 5 | Andy Montañez | Andy Montañez |

== Births ==
- December 10 – Natti Natasha, Dominican Republic reggaeton singer
