= List of Billboard Tropical Albums number ones from the 1980s =

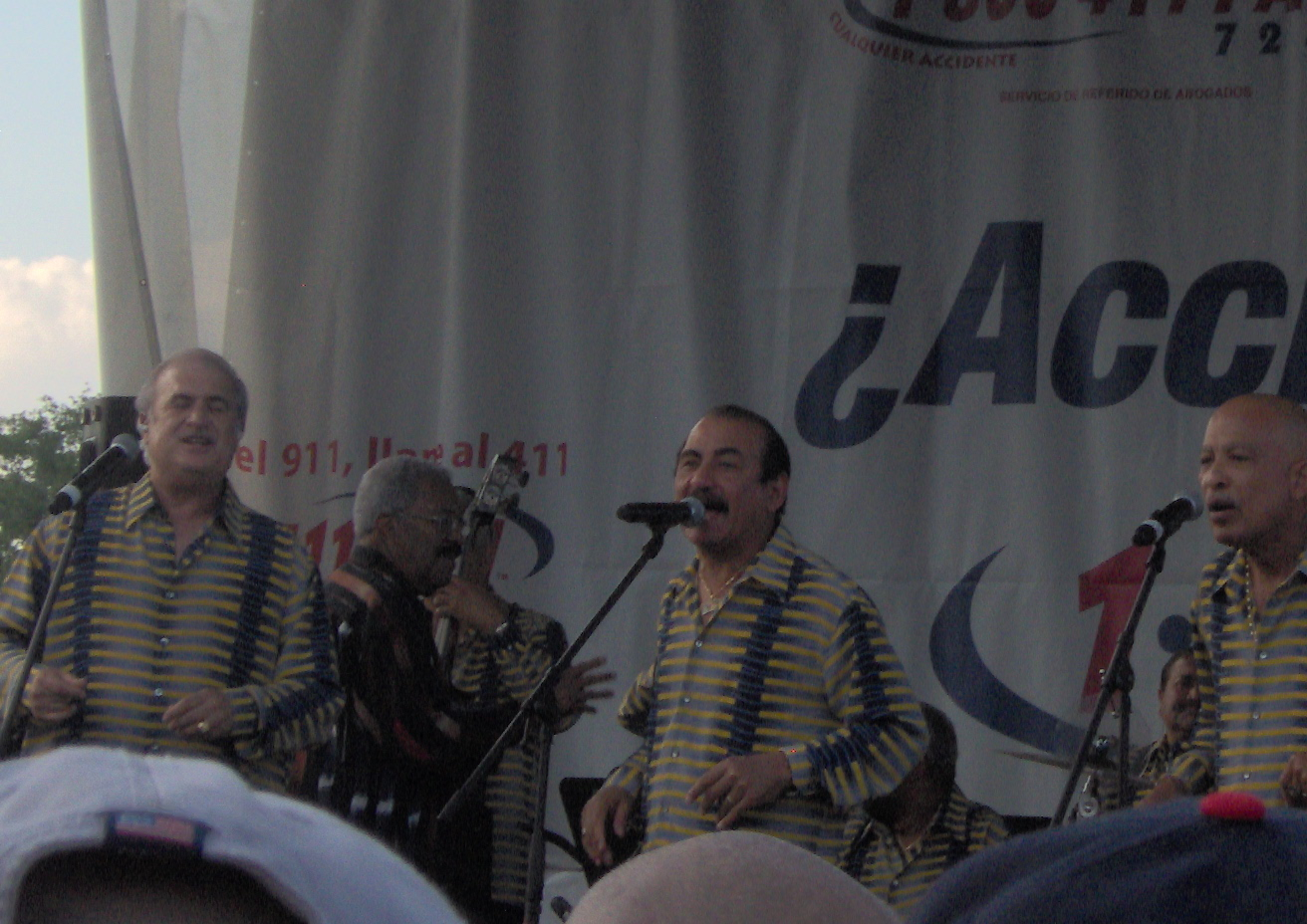
El Gran Combo de Puerto Rico (pictured in 2011) was the first musical act to reach number one on the Tropical Albums chart in 1985. They also had the most number one albums of the 1980s with a total of five records.

In June 1985, Billboard magazine established Tropical Albums (initially called Tropical/Salsa Latin Albums), a chart that ranks the best-selling tropical albums in the United States. The chart was published on a fortnightly basis with its positions being compiled by sales data from Latin music retailers and distributors. According to Billboard, tropical music is the "sound of the Spanish-speaking Caribbean – though it extends beyond it". In the 1980s, 17 albums topped the chart.

The first album to reach number one on the Tropical Albums chart was El Gran Combo de Puerto Rico's Innovations (1985). El Gran Combo de Puerto Rico was also the act with the most number-one albums of the 1980s with five records in total. The 1980s saw the popularity of salsa romántica in the tropical field with artists such as Frankie Ruiz and Eddie Santiago as the movement's pioneers. Ruiz and Santiago were the only other artists with more than two number ones on the Tropical Albums chart during the 1980s. Ruiz had the best-selling tropical album of 1986 with his debut album as a soloist, Solista Pero No Solo (1985). Santiago achieved the same feat from 1987 to 1989 with his albums Atrevido y Diferente (1986), Sigo Atrevido (1987), and Invasión de la Privacidad (1988).

Lalo Rodríguez achieved his only number one on any Billboard chart with Un Nuevo Despertar (1988) which spawned the single "Ven, Devórame Otra Vez" and became a top-ten hit on the Billboard Hot Latin Songs chart. Rodríguez won three Lo Nuestro Awards at the inaugural award ceremony in 1989 including Tropical Album of the Year, Tropical Song of the Year, and Tropical Artist of the Year. Luis Enrique had two number one albums on the chart with Amor y Alegría (1988) and Mi Mundo (1989). The latter was the final number one of the decade and also won Tropical Album of the Year at the following Lo Nuestro Awards.

== Chart history ==
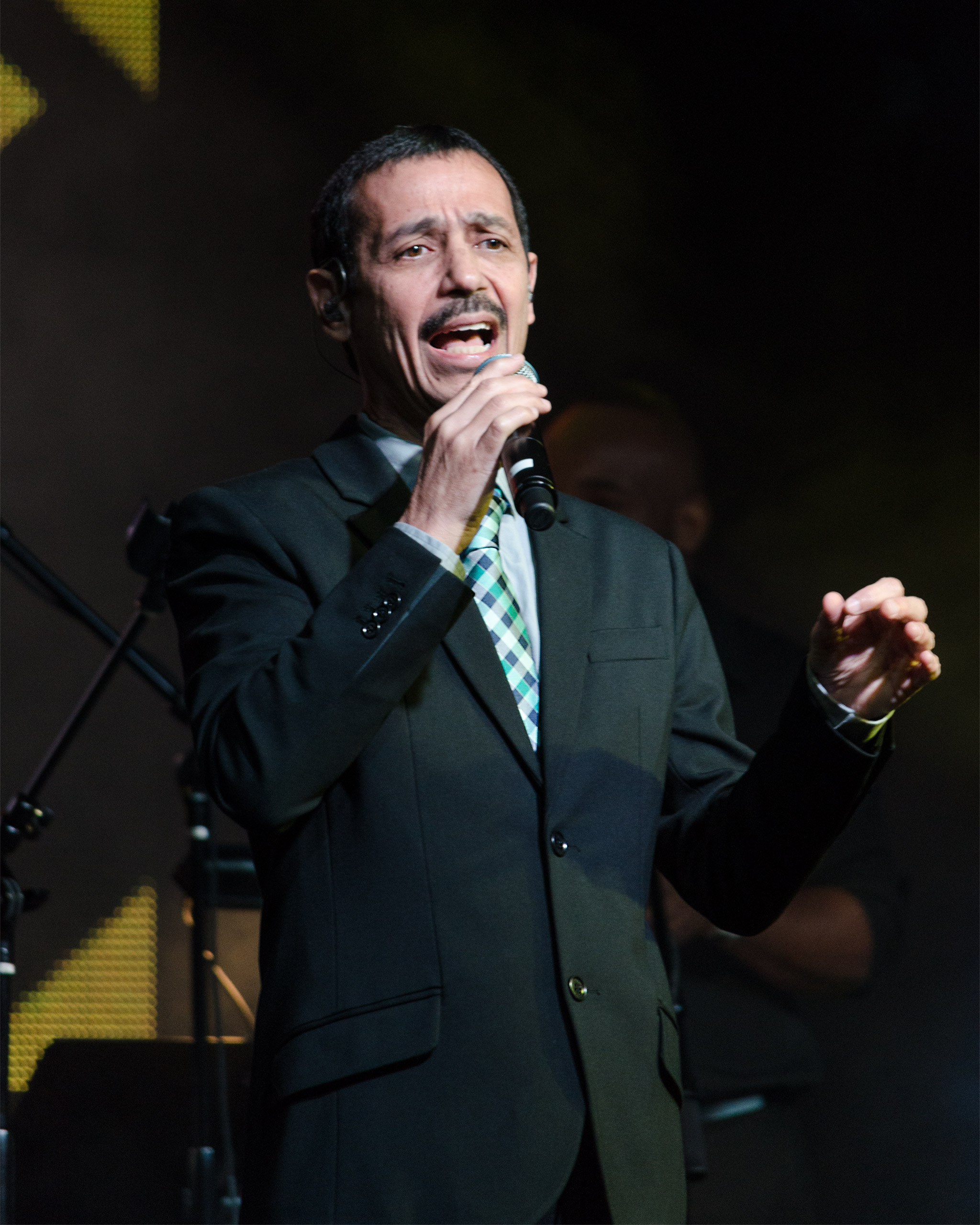
Eddie Santiago (pictured in 2014), considered to be one of the pioneers of the salsa romántica era, had the best-selling tropical albums from 1987 to 1989.

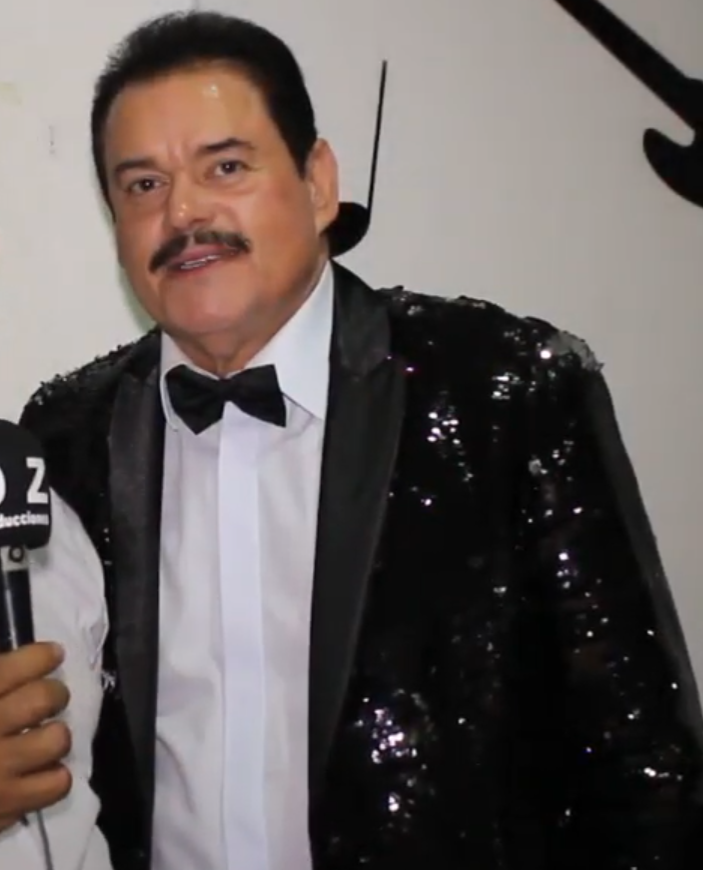
Lalo Rodríguez (pictured in 2019) achieved his only chart-topper with Un Nuevo Despertar (1988).

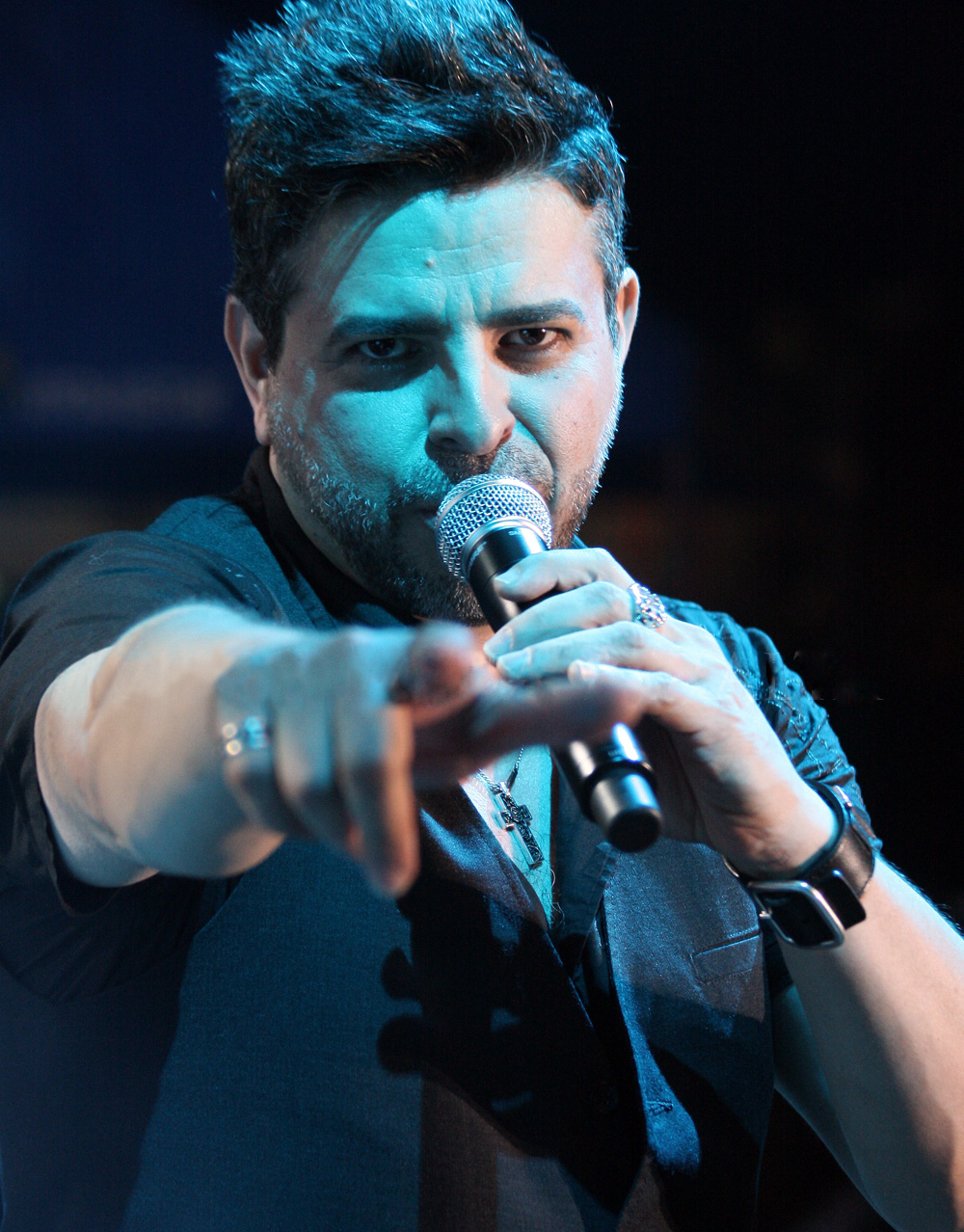
Luis Enrique (pictured in 2010) had the final number one of the decade with Mi Mundo (1989).

Key
| † | Indicates best-selling tropical album of the year |

Chart history
| Issue date | Album | Artist(s) | Ref. |
|---|---|---|---|
| June 29, 1985 | Innovations | El Gran Combo de Puerto Rico | |
| July 13, 1985 | Innovations | El Gran Combo de Puerto Rico | |
| July 27, 1985 | Innovations | El Gran Combo de Puerto Rico | |
| August 10, 1985 | Innovations | El Gran Combo de Puerto Rico | |
| August 24, 1985 | Innovations | El Gran Combo de Puerto Rico | |
| September 7, 1985 | Innovations | El Gran Combo de Puerto Rico | |
| September 21, 1985 | Innovations | El Gran Combo de Puerto Rico | |
| October 5, 1985 | Innovations | El Gran Combo de Puerto Rico | |
| October 19, 1985 | Innovations | El Gran Combo de Puerto Rico | |
| November 2, 1985 | Innovations | El Gran Combo de Puerto Rico | |
| November 16, 1985 | Innovations | El Gran Combo de Puerto Rico | |
| November 30, 1985 | Innovations | El Gran Combo de Puerto Rico | |
| December 14, 1985 | Y Su Pueblo | El Gran Combo de Puerto Rico | |
| December 28, 1985 | Y Su Pueblo | El Gran Combo de Puerto Rico | |
| January 11, 1986 | Y Su Pueblo | El Gran Combo de Puerto Rico | |
| January 25, 1986 | Y Su Pueblo | El Gran Combo de Puerto Rico | |
| February 8, 1986 | Y Su Pueblo | El Gran Combo de Puerto Rico | |
| February 22, 1986 | Solista Pero No Solo † | Frankie Ruiz | |
| March 8, 1986 | La Magia de | Hansel & Raúl | |
| March 22, 1986 | La Magia de | Hansel & Raúl | |
| April 5, 1986 | La Magia de | Hansel & Raúl | |
| April 19, 1986 | Solista Pero No Solo † | Frankie Ruiz | |
| May 3, 1986 | La Magia de | Hansel & Raúl | |
| May 17, 1986 | Solista Pero No Solo † | Frankie Ruiz | |
| May 31, 1986 | Solista Pero No Solo † | Frankie Ruiz | |
| June 14, 1986 | Solista Pero No Solo † | Frankie Ruiz | |
| June 28, 1986 | Solista Pero No Solo † | Frankie Ruiz | |
| July 12, 1986 | Solista Pero No Solo † | Frankie Ruiz | |
| July 26, 1986 | Solista Pero No Solo † | Frankie Ruiz | |
| August 9, 1986 | Solista Pero No Solo † | Frankie Ruiz | |
| August 23, 1986 | Y Su Pueblo | El Gran Combo de Puerto Rico | |
| September 6, 1986 | Y Su Pueblo | El Gran Combo de Puerto Rico | |
| September 20, 1986 | Y Su Pueblo | El Gran Combo de Puerto Rico | |
| October 4, 1986 | Y Su Pueblo | El Gran Combo de Puerto Rico | |
| October 18, 1986 | Y Su Pueblo | El Gran Combo de Puerto Rico | |
| November 1, 1986 | Y Su Pueblo | El Gran Combo de Puerto Rico | |
| November 15, 1986 | Y Su Pueblo | El Gran Combo de Puerto Rico | |
| November 29, 1986 | Y Su Pueblo | El Gran Combo de Puerto Rico | |
| December 13, 1986 | Y Su Pueblo | El Gran Combo de Puerto Rico | |
| December 27, 1986 | Y Su Pueblo | El Gran Combo de Puerto Rico | |
| January 10, 1987 | Atrevido y Diferente † | Eddie Santiago | |
| January 24, 1987 | Y Su Pueblo | El Gran Combo de Puerto Rico | |
| February 7, 1987 | Atrevido y Diferente † | Eddie Santiago | |
| February 21, 1987 | Atrevido y Diferente † | Eddie Santiago | |
| March 7, 1987 | Atrevido y Diferente † | Eddie Santiago | |
| March 21, 1987 | Atrevido y Diferente † | Eddie Santiago | |
| April 4, 1987 | Atrevido y Diferente † | Eddie Santiago | |
| April 18, 1987 | Voy Pa' Encima | Frankie Ruiz | |
| May 2, 1987 | Voy Pa' Encima | Frankie Ruiz | |
| May 16, 1987 | Voy Pa' Encima | Frankie Ruiz | |
| May 30, 1987 | Voy Pa' Encima | Frankie Ruiz | |
| June 13, 1987 | Voy Pa' Encima | Frankie Ruiz | |
| June 27, 1987 | Atrevido y Diferente † | Eddie Santiago | |
| July 11, 1987 | Atrevido y Diferente † | Eddie Santiago | |
| July 25, 1987 | Atrevido y Diferente † | Eddie Santiago | |
| August 8, 1987 | Voy Pa' Encima | Frankie Ruiz | |
| August 22, 1987 | Voy Pa' Encima | Frankie Ruiz | |
| September 5, 1987 | Voy Pa' Encima | Frankie Ruiz | |
| September 19, 1987 | Voy Pa' Encima | Frankie Ruiz | |
| October 3, 1987 | Voy Pa' Encima | Frankie Ruiz | |
| October 17, 1987 | Atrevido y Diferente † | Eddie Santiago | |
| October 31, 1987 | Voy Pa' Encima | Frankie Ruiz | |
| November 14, 1987 | Voy Pa' Encima | Frankie Ruiz | |
| November 28, 1987 | 25 Aniversario: 1962 - 1987 | El Gran Combo de Puerto Rico | |
| December 12, 1987 | 30 Aniversario | Tommy Olivencia | |
| December 26, 1987 | Historia Musical de Frankie Ruiz | Frankie Ruiz | |
| January 16, 1988 | Sigo Atrevido † | Eddie Santiago | |
| January 30, 1988 | Sigo Atrevido † | Eddie Santiago | |
| February 13, 1988 | Sigo Atrevido † | Eddie Santiago | |
| February 27, 1988 | Sigo Atrevido † | Eddie Santiago | |
| March 12, 1988 | Sigo Atrevido † | Eddie Santiago | |
| March 26, 1988 | Sigo Atrevido † | Eddie Santiago | |
| April 9, 1988 | Sigo Atrevido † | Eddie Santiago | |
| April 23, 1988 | Sigo Atrevido † | Eddie Santiago | |
| May 7, 1988 | Sigo Atrevido † | Eddie Santiago | |
| May 21, 1988 | Sigo Atrevido † | Eddie Santiago | |
| June 4, 1988 | Romántico y Sabroso | El Gran Combo de Puerto Rico | |
| June 18, 1988 | Romántico y Sabroso | El Gran Combo de Puerto Rico | |
| July 2, 1988 | Un Nuevo Despertar | Lalo Rodríguez | |
| July 16, 1988 | Un Nuevo Despertar | Lalo Rodríguez | |
| July 30, 1988 | Un Nuevo Despertar | Lalo Rodríguez | |
| August 13, 1988 | Un Nuevo Despertar | Lalo Rodríguez | |
| August 27, 1988 | Un Nuevo Despertar | Lalo Rodríguez | |
| September 10, 1988 | Un Nuevo Despertar | Lalo Rodríguez | |
| September 24, 1988 | Un Nuevo Despertar | Lalo Rodríguez | |
| October 8, 1988 | Un Nuevo Despertar | Lalo Rodríguez | |
| October 22, 1988 | Un Nuevo Despertar | Lalo Rodríguez | |
| November 5, 1988 | Amor y Alegría | Luis Enrique | |
| November 19, 1988 | Amor y Alegría | Luis Enrique | |
| December 3, 1988 | Amor y Alegría | Luis Enrique | |
| December 17, 1988 | Amor y Alegría | Luis Enrique | |
| December 31, 1988 | Amor y Alegría | Luis Enrique | |
| January 14, 1989 | Juntos Pa' Goza | Various artists | |
| January 28, 1989 | Invasión de la Privacidad † | Eddie Santiago | |
| February 11, 1989 | Invasión de la Privacidad † | Eddie Santiago | |
| February 25, 1989 | Invasión de la Privacidad † | Eddie Santiago | |
| March 11, 1989 | Invasión de la Privacidad † | Eddie Santiago | |
| March 11, 1989 | Invasión de la Privacidad † | Eddie Santiago | |
| March 25, 1989 | Invasión de la Privacidad † | Eddie Santiago | |
| April 8, 1989 | Invasión de la Privacidad † | Eddie Santiago | |
| April 22, 1989 | Invasión de la Privacidad † | Eddie Santiago | |
| May 6, 1989 | Invasión de la Privacidad † | Eddie Santiago | |
| May 20, 1989 | Invasión de la Privacidad † | Eddie Santiago | |
| June 3, 1989 | Invasión de la Privacidad † | Eddie Santiago | |
| June 17, 1989 | Invasión de la Privacidad † | Eddie Santiago | |
| July 1, 1989 | Ámame | El Gran Combo de Puerto Rico | |
| July 15, 1989 | Ámame | El Gran Combo de Puerto Rico | |
| July 29, 1989 | Invasión de la Privacidad † | Eddie Santiago | |
| August 12, 1989 | Ámame | El Gran Combo de Puerto Rico | |
| August 26, 1989 | Ámame | El Gran Combo de Puerto Rico | |
| September 9, 1989 | Ámame | El Gran Combo de Puerto Rico | |
| September 23, 1989 | Ámame | El Gran Combo de Puerto Rico | |
| October 7, 1989 | Mi Mundo | Luis Enrique | |
| October 21, 1989 | Mi Mundo | Luis Enrique | |
| November 4, 1989 | Mi Mundo | Luis Enrique | |
| November 18, 1989 | Mi Mundo | Luis Enrique | |
| December 2, 1989 | Mi Mundo | Luis Enrique | |
| December 16, 1989 | Mi Mundo | Luis Enrique | |
| December 30, 1989 | Mi Mundo | Luis Enrique | |

== See also ==
- 1980s in Latin music
- List of Billboard Latin Pop Albums number ones from the 1980s
- List of Billboard Regional Mexican Albums number ones from the 1980s
