= Premio Lo Nuestro 1989 =

Latin Music awards show

1st Lo Nuestro Awards
- Date: Wednesday, May 31, 1989
- Site: Knight Center; Miami, Florida, USA
- Hosted by: Lucy Pereda and Antonio Vodanovich

Highlights
- Most awards: Los Bukis and Lalo Rodríguez (3)
- Most nominations: Los Bukis (5)

The 1st Lo Nuestro Awards ceremony, presented by Univision honoring the best Latin music of 1988 and 1989 took place on May 31, 1989 at the Knight Center, in Miami, Florida, United States. The ceremony was broadcast in the United States and Latin America by Univision.

During the ceremony, nineteen categories were presented. Winners were announced at the live event and included Mexican band Los Bukis and Puerto-Rican singer Lalo Rodríguez receiving three awards each. Spanish singer Isabel Pantoja earned two accolades, including Pop Album of the Year. Mexican singer-songwriter Marco Antonio Solís was named Producer of the Year, while Roberto Livi and Alberto Campoy won for Composer of the Year for the track "Toco Madera" performed by Spanish singer Raphael.

== Background ==
In 1989, the Lo Nuestro Awards were established by Univision, to recognize the most talented performers of Latin music. Joaquín Blaya, President of Univision, named the awards the "Hispanic Grammys", since the Lo Nuestro would be the first Spanish-language music awards shows that does not reveal winners before the broadcast of the show. "The time has come for us to legitimize an award that recognizes Hispanic talent, and we wanted to do it by the same standard that the (English language) industry is measured," Blaya added. The nominees and winners were selected by a voting poll conducted among program directors of Spanish-language radio stations in the United States and also based on chart performance on Billboard Latin music charts, with the results being tabulated and certified by the accounting firm Deloitte. The award included a trophy shaped like a treble clef. The categories were for the Pop, Tropical/Salsa, and Regional Mexican genres, with additional awards for Producer, Composer and Crossover Artist of the Year, respectively. The 1st Lo Nuestro Awards ceremony was held on May 31, 1989 at the Knight Center, in Miami, Florida, United States. The ceremony was broadcast in the United States and Latin America by Univision with an estimated audience of 200 million viewers in 16 countries.

== Winners and nominees ==
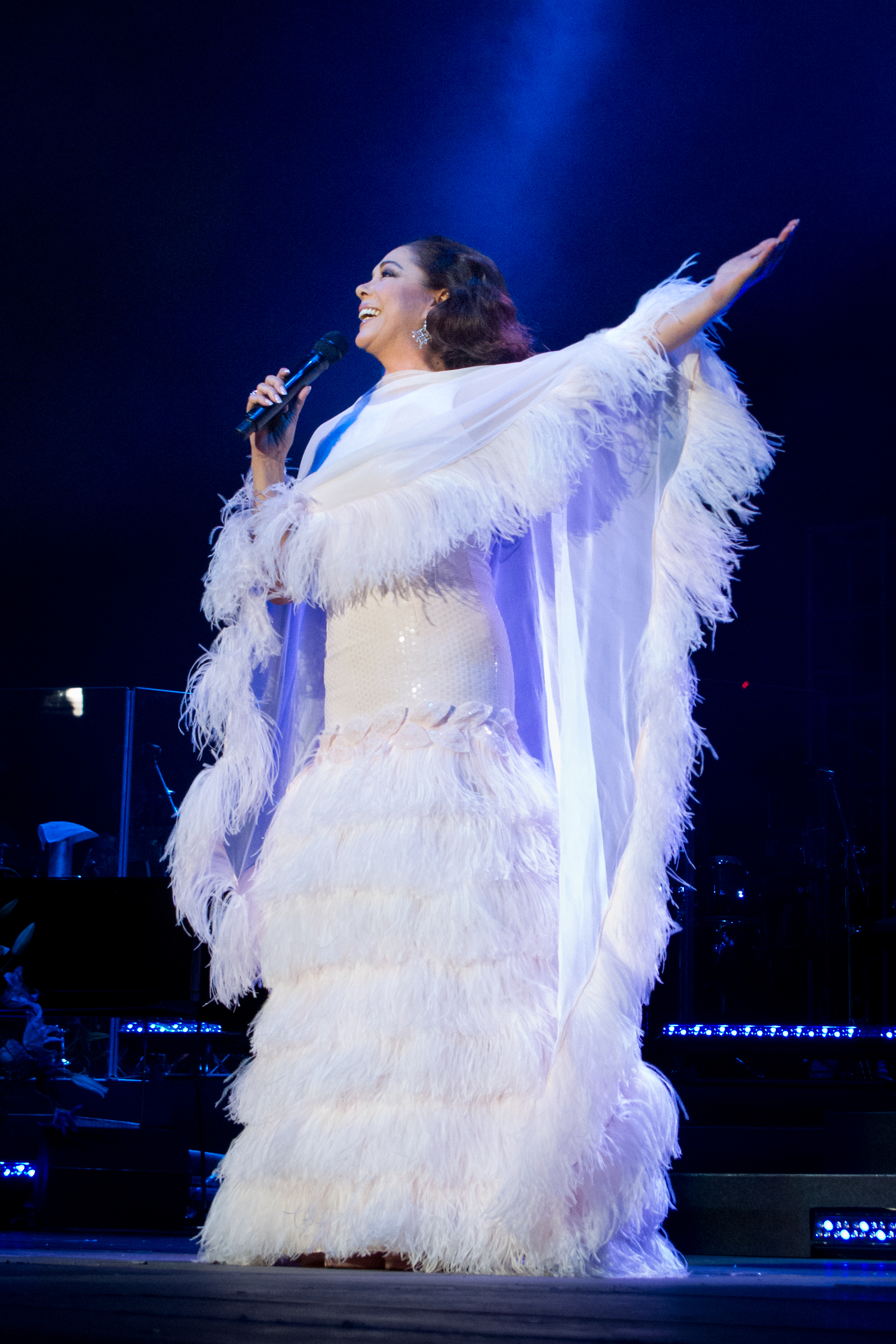
Spanish singer Isabel Pantoja (pictured in 2012) won the Lo Nuestro Award for Pop Female Artist of the Year.

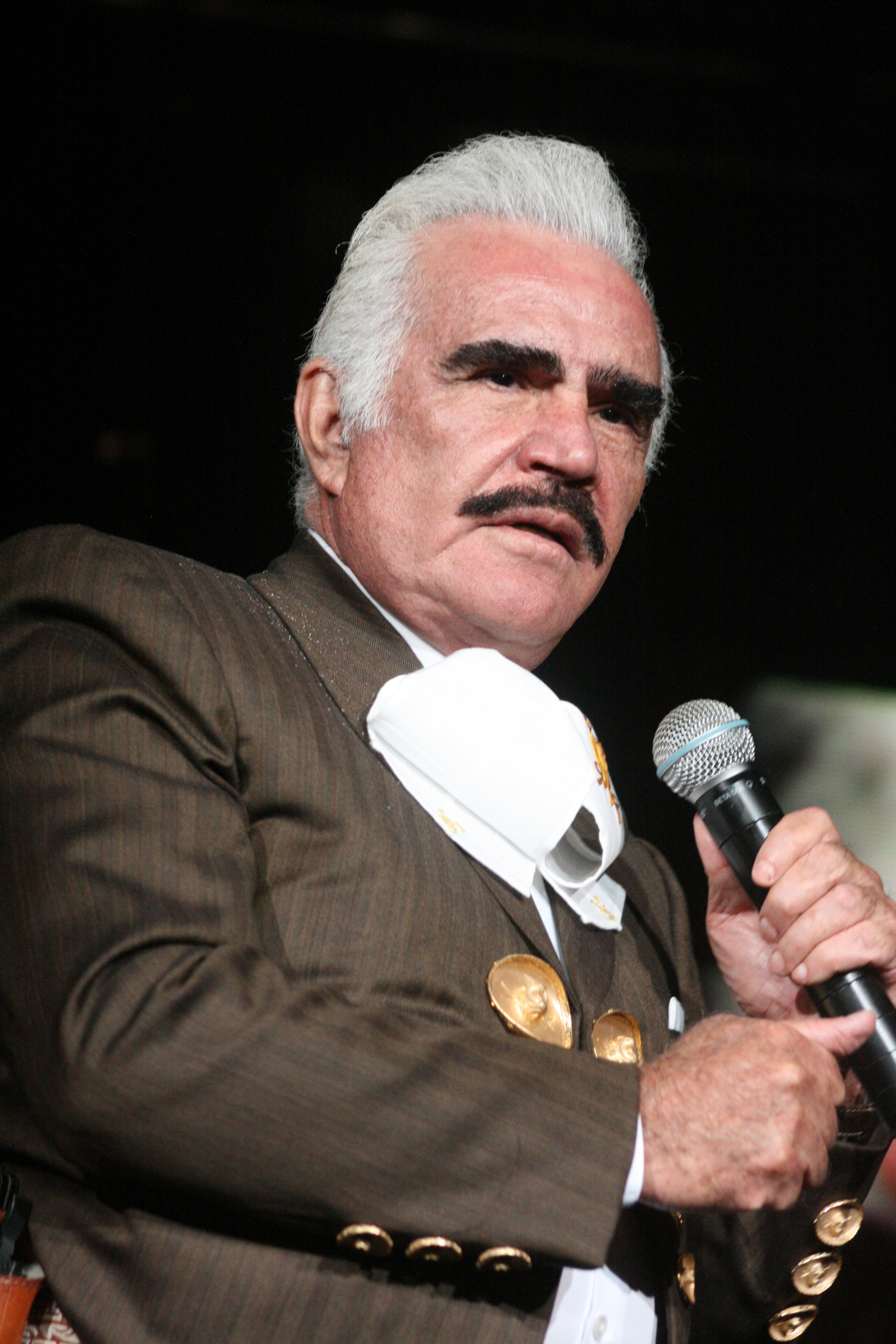
Singer Vicente Fernández (pictured in 2011) received the Male Regional Mexican Artist of the Year Award.

Winners were announced before the live audience during the ceremony. Mexican band Los Bukis dominated the Regional/Mexican field winning for Group, Song ("Y Ahora Te Vas") and Album of the Year (Si Me Recuerdas). The album was nominated for a Grammy Award for Best Mexican/Mexican-American Album. Three awards were also received by Puerto-Rican Lalo Rodríguez, including Tropical/Salsa Artist, Album (Un Nuevo Despertar) and Song of the Year for his top ten single "Ven, Devórame Otra Vez". Mexican singer Yuri was awarded for Pop Song of the Year for "Qué Te Pasa", a track that spent 16 weeks at number-one in the Billboard Top Latin Songs chart. Desde Andalucía by Spanish singer Isabel Pantoja won for Pop Album of the Year and reached number-one in the Billboard Latin Pop Albums chart.

Winners and nominees of the 1st Annual Lo Nuestro Awards.
Pop Album of the Year	Pop Song of the Year
Isabel Pantoja – Desde Andalucía; Braulio – Con Todos Mis Sentidos; Emmanuel – Entre Lunas; José José – Soy Así; José Luis Rodríguez – Señor Corazón	Yuri – "Qué Te Pasa"; Angela Carrasco – "Boca Rosa"; Rocío Dúrcal – "Como Tu Mujer"; Franco – "María"; Raphael – "Toco Madera"
Pop Male Artist of the Year	Pop Female Artist of the Year
José José; Braulio; Emmanuel; Roberto Carlos	Isabel Pantoja; Ana Gabriel; Yolandita Monge; Yuri
Pop Group of the Year	Pop New Artist of the Year
Gloria Estefan and Miami Sound Machine; Eydie Gormé and Roberto Carlos; Los Bukis; Alberto Vázquez and Joan Sebastian	Gipsy Kings; Hombres G; José Javier Solís; Carlos Vives
Regional Mexican Album of the Year	Regional Mexican Song of the Year
Los Bukis – Si Me Recuerdas; Bronco – Superbronco; Vicente Fernández – El Cuatrero; Linda Ronstadt – Canciones de Mi Padre; Los Tigres del Norte – Idolos del Pueblo	Los Bukis – "Y Ahora Te Vas"; Vicente Fernández and Vikki Carr – "Dos Corazones"; Los Bukis – "Tus Mentiras"; Los Caminantes – "Entre Mas Lejos Me Vaya"; Los Yonics – "Tu Presa Fácil"
Regional Mexican Artist of the Year	Regional Mexican Group of the Year
Vicente Fernández; Ramón Ayala; Fito Olivares; Joan Sebastian	Los Bukis; Bronco; Los Tigres del Norte; Los Yonics
Regional Mexican New Artist of the Year
José Javier Solís; Grupo Topaz; Industria del Amor; Eliseo Robles
Tropical Salsa Album of the Year	Tropical Salsa Song of the Year
Lalo Rodríguez – Un Nuevo Despertar; El Gran Combo de Puerto Rico – Romántico y Sabroso; Luis Enrique – Amor y Alegria; Willie González – El Original y Unico; Eddie Santiago – Sigo Atrevido	Lalo Rodríguez – "Ven, Devórame Otra Vez"; El Gran Combo de Puerto Rico – "Cupido"; Luis Enrique – "Tu No Le Amas, Le Temes"; Eddie Santiago – "Lluvia"; Max Torres – "Cara Dura"
Tropical Salsa Artist of the Year	Tropical Salsa Group of the Year
Lalo Rodríguez; Luis Enrique; Frankie Ruiz; Eddie Santiago	El Gran Combo de Puerto Rico; Conjunto Chaney; Fania All Stars; La Patrulla 15
Tropical Salsa New Artist of the Year
Luis Enrique; Willie González; Lalo Rodríguez; Max Torres
Producer of the Year	Composer of the Year
Marco Antonio Solís – Si Me Recuerdas (Los Bukis); Braulio and Ricardo Eddie – Con Todos Mis Sentidos (Braulio); Ralfy Cartagena – Romántico y Sabroso (El Gran Combo de Puerto Rico); Enrique Franco – Idolos del Pueblo (Los Tigres del Norte); Rafael Pérez-Botija – Soy Así (José José); Frank Torres – Un Nuevo Despertar (Lalo Rodríguez)	Roberto Livi and Alberto Campoy – "Toco Madera" (Raphael); J.R. Florez and Difelisatti – "Qué Te Pasa" (Yuri); Palmer Hernández – "Ven, Devórame Otra Vez" (Lalo Rodríguez); Luis Angel – "Lluvia" (Eddie Santiago); Jesús Navarrete – "Tu Presa Fácil" (Los Yonics); Marco Antonio Solís – "Y Ahora Te Vas" (Los Bukis)
Crossover Artist of the Year
Gloria Estefan and Miami Sound Machine; Eydie Gormé; Gipsy Kings; Linda Ronstadt; Brenda K. Starr

== Presenters ==
Presenter(s)	Category
Yuri; Franco	Presenters of the awards for Tropical Artist and Tropical Group of the Year
Braulio; Angela Carrasco	Presenters of the awards for Tropical Album of the Year
Brenda K. Starr; Jorge Múñiz	Presenters of the awards for Tropical New Artist and Tropical Song of the Year
Rocío Jurado; José Luis Rodríguez	Presenters of the awards for Regional Mexican Group and Regional Mexican Artist of the Year
Luis Angel; Ednita Nazario	Presenters of the award for Regional Mexican New Artist
Yuri; Franco	Presenters of the award for Regional Mexican Album of the Year
Ana Gabriel; José Luis Rodríguez	Presenters of the award for Regional Mexican Song of the Year
Angela Carrasco	Presenter of the award for Composer of the Year
José Javier Solís	Presenter of the award for Pop Group of the Year
Vikki Carr	Presenter of the award for Crossover Artist of the Year
Ricardo Montaner; Roberto Livi	Presenters of the award for Producer of the Year
Luis Enrique; Marco Antonio Solís	Presenters of the award for Pop Female Artist
Vikki Carr	Presenter of the award for Pop Male Artist
Gloria Estefan; Emilio Estefan	Presenters of the awards for Pop Album of the Year and Pop Song of the Year

== Performers ==
Name(s)	Role	Performed
Ricardo Montaner	Performer	"Tan Enamorados"
Los Yonics	Performers	
Vikki Carr; Mariachi Cobre; Stephen Carrillo	Performers	"Ranchero Medley"
Luis Enrique	Performer	"Desesperado"
Angela Carrasco	Performer	"Boca Rosa"
Fito Olivares y su Orquesta	Performer	"Mi Caballito"
Brenda K. Starr	Performer	"Breakfast in Bed"
José Javier Solís	Performer	
Rumba Tres; Ballet Flamenco de Rosita Segovia	Performers	"Bamboleo"
Ana Gabriel	Performer	"Ay Amor"
Franco	Performer	"María"
Yuri	Performer	"Hombres al Borde de un Ataque de Celos"
Braulio	Performer	"Amándote, Soñandote"
José Luis Rodríguez	Performer	"Baila Mi Rumba"
Los Bukis	Performers	"Y Ahora Te Vas"
Roberto Carlos	Performer	"Mis Amores"

== See also ==
- 1988 in Latin music
- 1989 in Latin music
- Grammy Award for Best Latin Pop Album
