= Premio Lo Nuestro 1990 =

Latin Music awards show

2nd Lo Nuestro Awards
- Date: Thursday, May 24, 1990
- Site: Knight Center; Miami, Florida, USA

Highlights
- Most awards: Luis Enrique (3)
- Most nominations: El Gran Combo de Puerto Rico, Vicente Fernández, and Los Yonics (4)

The 2nd Lo Nuestro Awards ceremony, presented by Univision honoring the best Latin music of 1989 and 1990 took place on May 24, 1990, at a live presentation held at the Knight Center in Miami, Florida. The ceremony was broadcast in the United States and Latin America by Univision.

During the ceremony, sixteen categories were presented. Winners were announced at the live event and included Nicaraguan singer Luis Enrique receiving three competitive awards. Mexican singer-songwriter Ana Gabriel, French band Kaoma, and Mexican group Bronco, and performer Vicente Fernández earned two accolades each.

== Background ==
In 1989, the Lo Nuestro Awards were established by Univision, to recognize the most talented performers of Latin music. The nominees and winners were selected by a voting poll conducted among program directors of Spanish-language radio stations in the United States and also based on chart performance on Billboard Latin music charts, with the results being tabulated and certified by the accounting firm Deloitte. The award included a trophy shaped like a treble clef. The categories were for the Pop, Tropical/Salsa, and Regional Mexican genres. The 2nd Lo Nuestro Awards ceremony was held on May 24, 1991, in a live presentation held at the Knight Center in Miami, Florida. The ceremony was broadcast in the United States and Latin America by Univision.

== Winners and nominees ==
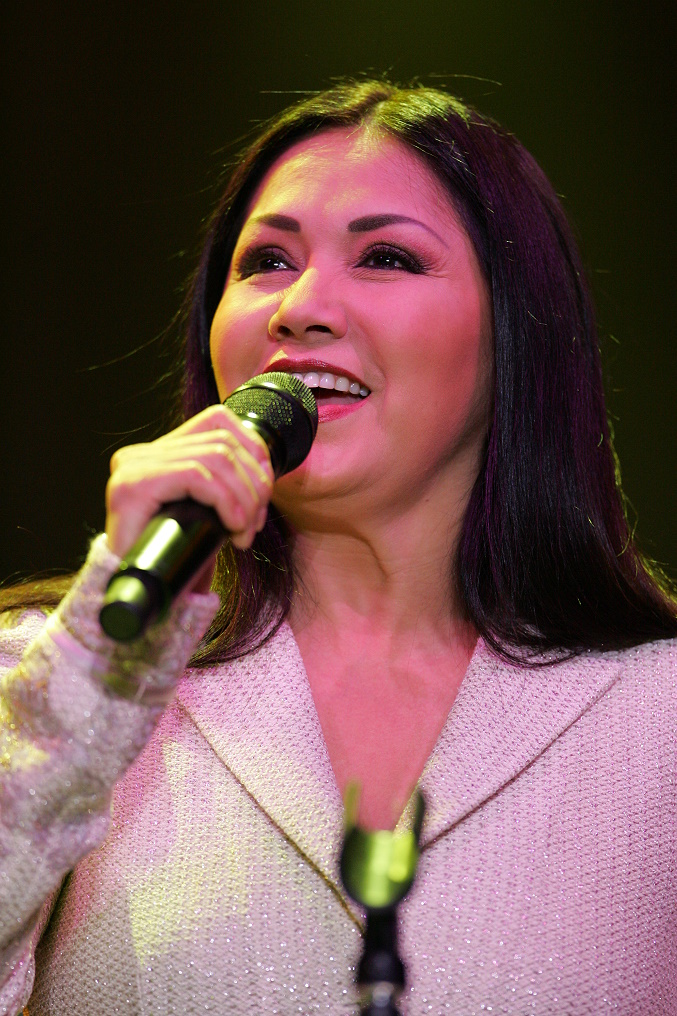
Mexican singer Ana Gabriel (pictured in 2006) won the Lo Nuestro Award for Pop Female Artist of the Year.

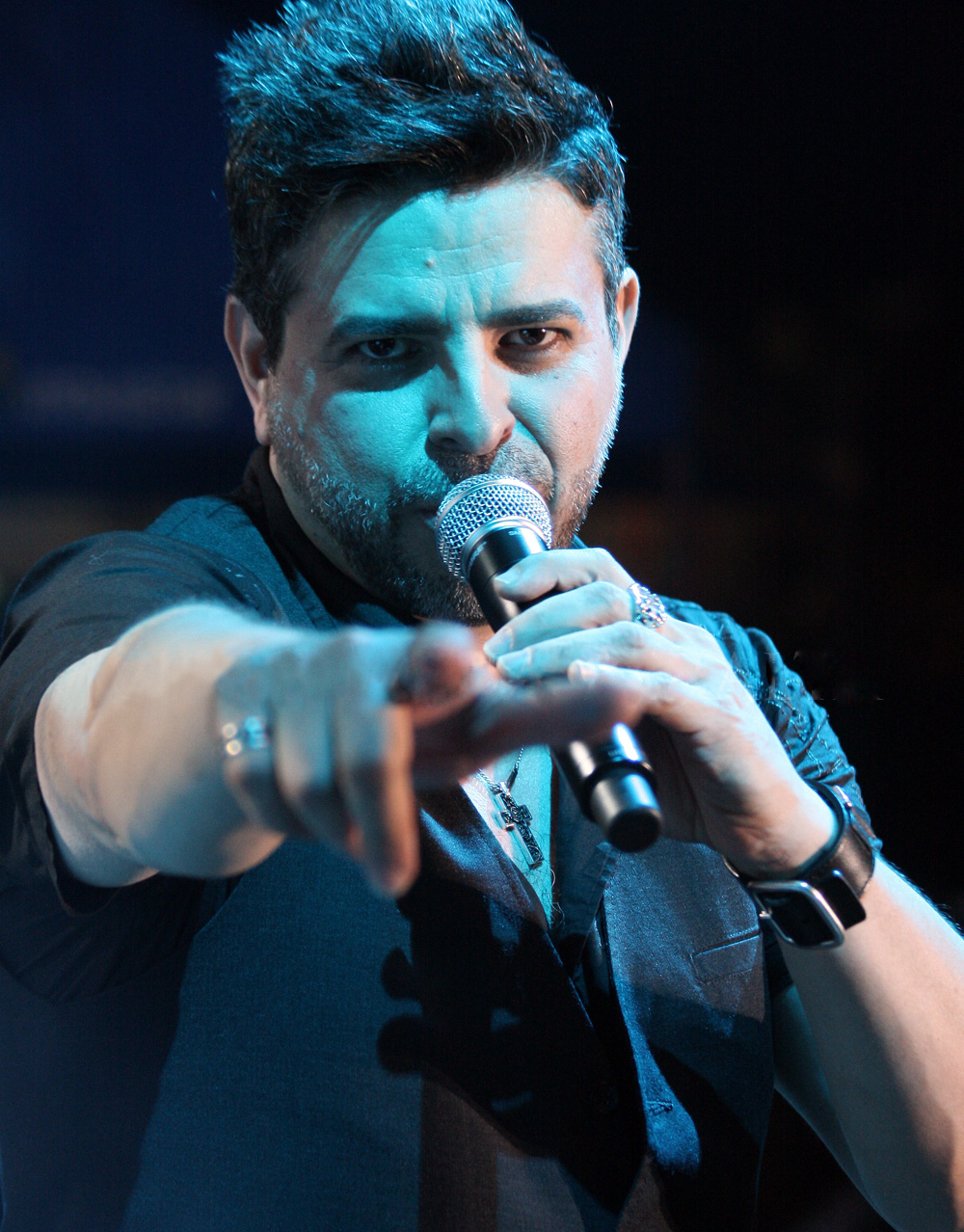
Nicaraguan singer Luis Enrique (pictured in 2010) was the most awarded performer, winning for Artist, Album and Song of the Year in the Tropical/Salsa field.

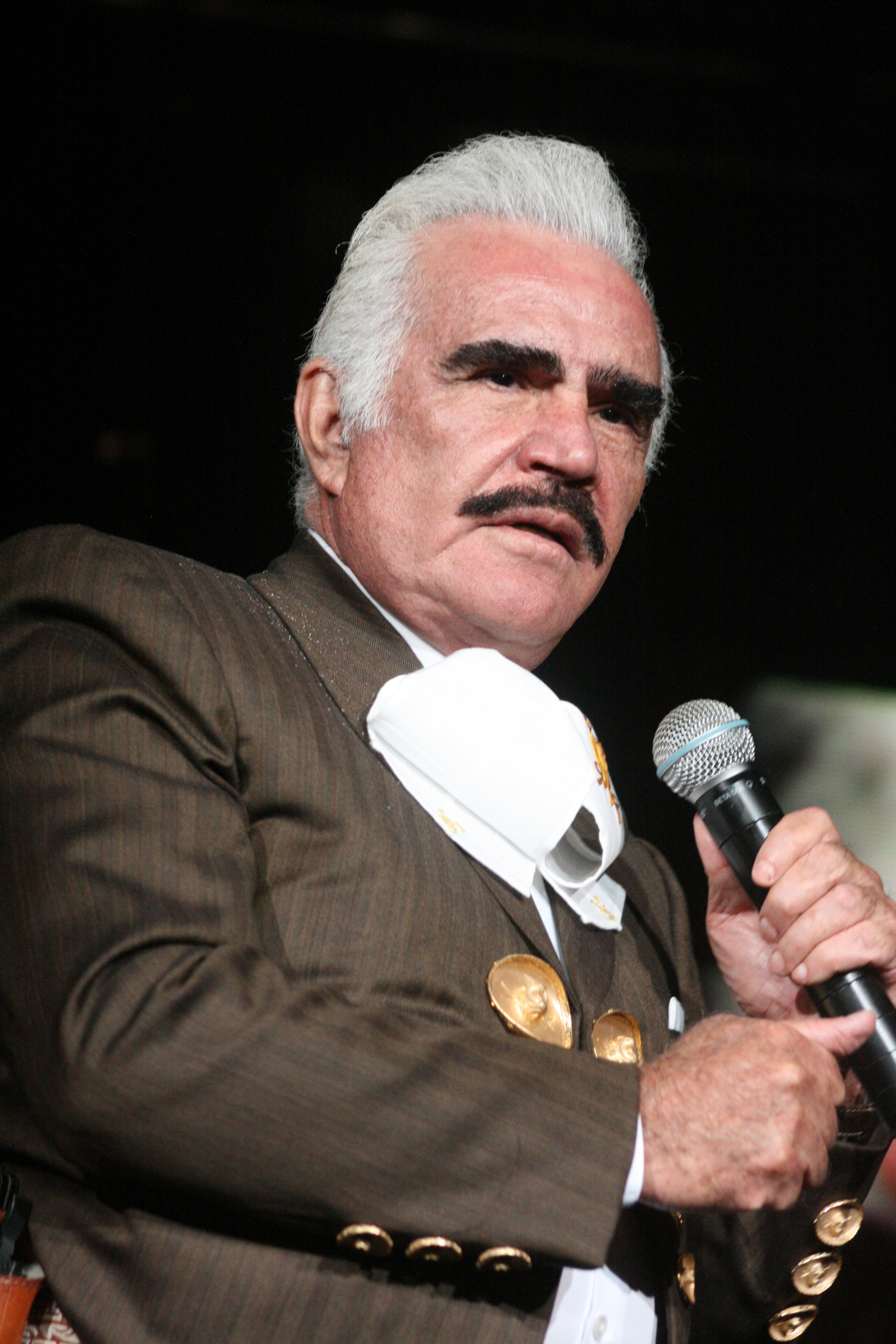
Singer Vicente Fernández (pictured in 2011) received the Male Regional Mexican Artist of the Year Award.

Winners were announced before the live audience during the ceremony. Mexican singer Vicente Fernández and group Los Yonics, and Puerto-Rican band El Gran Combo de Puerto Rico were the most nominated acts with four nominations each. Fernández won two awards for Regional/Mexican Artist and Song of the Year for his top ten single "Por Tu Maldito Amor". Mexican singer-songwriter Ana Gabriel was awarded for Female Pop Artist and Pop Album of the Year with Tierra de Nadie.

Nicaraguan singer Luis Enrique dominated the Tropical/Salsa field winning all his nominations, including Artist, Song and Album of the Year for his release Mi Mundo. Cuban-American singer Celia Cruz earned the first Lifetime Achievement Award and fellow Cuban performer Gloria Estefan won for Crossover Artist of the Year.

Winners and nominees of the 2nd Annual Lo Nuestro Awards.
Pop Album of the Year	Pop Song of the Year
Ana Gabriel – Tierra de Nadie; Chayanne – Chayanne; Julio Iglesias – Raíces; Ricardo Montaner – Ricardo Montaner, Vol. 2; José Luis Rodríguez – Tengo Derecho a Ser Feliz	Luis Miguel – "La Incondicional"; Franco De Vita – "Te Amo"; Ana Gabriel – "Simplemente Amigos"; José José – "Como Tú"; José Luis Rodríguez – "Baila Mi Rumba"
Pop Male Artist of the Year	Pop Female Artist of the Year
Chayanne; Luis Miguel; Ricardo Montaner; José Luis Rodríguez	Ana Gabriel; Rocío Dúrcal; Marisela; Isabel Pantoja
Pop Group of the Year	New Pop Artist of the Year
Kaoma; Los Bukis; Gipsy Kings; Pandora	Kaoma; Myriam Hernández; Teresa Guerra; Pablo Ruiz; Xuxa
Regional Mexican Album of the Year	Regional Mexican Song of the Year
Bronco – Un Golpe Más; Vicente Fernández – Por Tu Maldito Amor; La Mafia – Explosivo; Los Tigres del Norte – Los Corridos Prohibidos; Los Yonics – Siempre Te Amaré	Vicente Fernández – "Por Tu Maldito Amor"; Yolanda del Río – "Válgame Dios"; Vicente Fernández – "Mujeres Divinas"; Los Yonics – "Frente a Frente"; Los Yonics – "Perdón Por Tus Lágrimas"
Regional Mexican Artist of the Year	Regional Mexican Group of the Year
Vicente Fernández; Ramón Ayala; Fito Olivares; Joan Sebastian	Bronco; Los Caminantes; Los Tigres del Norte; Los Yonics
Regional Mexican New Artist of the Year
Los Temerarios; Cielo Azul; Emilio Navaira; Xelencia
Tropical Salsa Album of the Year	Tropical Salsa Song of the Year
Luis Enrique – Mi Mundo; Willie Colón – Top Secret; El Gran Combo de Puerto Rico – Amame; David Pabon – Es de Verdad; Eddie Santiago – Invasión de la Privacidad	Luis Enrique – "Lo Que Pasó Entre Tu y Yo... Pasó"; El Gran Combo de Puerto Rico – "Aguacero"; El Gran Combo de Puerto Rico – "Amame"; Tommy Olivencia – "Doce Rosas"; Gilberto Santa Rosa – "Tengo Una Muñeca"
Tropical Salsa Artist of the Year	Tropical Salsa Group of the Year
Luis Enrique; David Pabon; Gilberto Santa Rosa; Eddie Santiago	El Gran Combo de Puerto Rico; Chantelle; Hansel & Raúl; Patrulla 15
Tropical Salsa New Artist of the Year
Chantelle; Hansel; David Pabon; Tony Vega; Viti Ruiz
Producer of the Year	Composer of the Year
Homero Hernández – Un Golpe Más (Bronco); Ramón Arcuza – Raíces (Julio Iglesias); Enrique Franco – Los Corridos Prohibidos (Los Tigres del Norte); Rafael Ithier and Ernesto Sánchez – Amame (El Gran Combo de Puerto Rico); Mariano Pérez Bautista – Tierra de Nadie (Ana Gabriel); Frank Torres and Julio Cesar Delgado – Invasión de la Privacidad (Eddie Santiago)	Juan Carlos Calderón – "La Incondicional" (Luis Miguel); Palmer Hernández – "Amame" (El Gran Combo de Puerto Rico); Jorge Luis Piloto – "Lo Que Pasó Entre Tu y Yo... Pasó" (Luis Enrique); Jesús Navarrete – "Frente a Frente" (Los Yonics); Federico Méndez – "Por Tu Maldito Amor" (Vicente Fernández); Isidore York – "Baila Mi Rumba" (José Luis Rodríguez)
Crossover Artist of the Year
Gloria Estefan; Eydie Gormé; Gipsy Kings; Kaoma; Xuxa

== Presenters ==
Presenter(s)	Category
Ana Gabriel; Braulio	Presenters of the awards for Pop Group or Duo of the Year
Chayanne; Andrea Del Boca	Presenters of the award for Regional Mexican Group or Duo of the Year
Ricardo Montaner; Luis Enrique	Presenters of the awards for Pop New Artist and Tropical Group or Duo of the Year
María Martha Serra Lima; Miguel Mateos	Presenters of the award for Regional Mexican New Artist of the Year
Yolanda del Río; Fito Olivares	Presenters of the award for Tropical Salsa New Artist
Ramón Arcusa	Presenters of the award for Composer of the Year
Lucy Pereda; Diego Vodanovich	Presenters of the award for Pop Female Artist of the Year
Amanda Miguel; Diego Verdaguer	Presenter of the award for Pop Male Artist of the Year
Willy Chirino	Presenter of the award for Crossover Artist of the Year
Randy Carrillo; Esteban Carrillo	Presenters of the award for Regional Mexican Album of the Year
Laura Flores; Franco De Vita	Presenters of the award for Pop Album of the Year
Joaquín Blaya; Jimmy Schmitt	Presenters of the Lifetime Excellence Award
Chantelle	Presenters of the award for Tropical Album of the Year
Juan Carlos Calderón; Emilio Estefan	Presenters of the award for Producer of the Year
Myriam Hernández; José Javier Solís	Presenters of the award for Tropical Song of the Year
Valeria Lynch; Teresa Guerra	Presenters of the award for Regional Mexican Song of the Year
Braulio; Andrea Del Boca	Presenters of the award for Pop Song of the Year

== Performers ==
Name(s)	Role	Performed
Amanda Miguel; Diego Verdaguer	Performers	"Simplemente Amor"
Los Temerarios	Performers	"Tu Infame Engaño"
Myriam Hernández	Performer	"El Hombre Que Yo Amo"
Luis Enrique	Performer	"Lo Que Pasó Entre Tu y Yo... Pasó"
Los Yonics	Performers	
Franco De Vita	Performer	"Louis"
Jorge Fonseca	Performer	"Miami Te Quiero"
Ricardo Montaner	Performer	"Me Va a Extrañar"
Chantelle; Mariachi Cobre	Performers	
Yolanda del Río	Performer	"Válgame Dios"
David Pabon	Performer	"Aquel Viejo Motel"
Bronco	Performers	"Un Golpe Más"
Ana Gabriel	Performer	"Simplemente Amigos"
La Mafia	Performers	"Me Estoy Volviendo Loco"
Chayanne	Performer	"Simon Sez"
Kaoma	Performers	"Lambada"

== See also ==
- 1989 in Latin music
- 1990 in Latin music
- Grammy Award for Best Latin Pop Album
