= 30 Aniversario (disambiguation) =

30 Aniversario is an album by Tommy Olivencia.

30 Aniversario may also refer to:

- 30 Aniversario, album by Los Temerarios
- 30 Aniversario En Vivo, album by Los Invasores de Nuevo León
- 30 Aniversario Bailando Con El Mundo, album by El Gran Combo
- 30 Aniversario, album by Grupo Pegasso
- 30 Aniversario, album by Margarita Vargas La Diosa De La Cumbia
- 30 Aniversario, album by Manolo Escobar
- 30 Aniversario, album by Raphy Leavitt
- 30 Aniversario, album by Los Yonic's
- 30 Aniversario, compilation album by Oscar D'Leon
- 30 Aniversario, album by Juan Formell and Van Van
- 30 Aniversario, album by Conjunto Primavera
- 30 Aniversario, album by Orquesta La Solución
- 30 Aniversario, album by Mocedades
- 30 Aniversario, album by Sandro de América
- 30 Aniversario - En Concierto, album by Olga Guillot
