= Historia Musical de Frankie Ruiz =

Greatest hits album by Frankie Ruiz
- Released: 1987
- Genre: Salsa
- Label: Rodven

Professional ratings
Review scores
Source	Rating
AllMusic	4/5 stars

Historia Musical de Frankie Ruiz is a greatest hits album by Puerto Rican salsa musician, Frankie Ruiz. The album became his third album to top the Billboard Tropical Albums chart. The album includes not only tracks from his solo career but also from his years with Orquestra la Solución and Tommy Olivencia. The compilation album received a positive review from AllMusic's José A. Estévez Jr, who called it one of his best albums.

== Track listing ==
This information adapted from AllMusic.

No.	Title	Writer(s)	Length
1.	"Como Lo Hacen"	Raúl Marrero	5:06
2.	"Viajera"		05:01
3.	"Que Se Mueran de Envidia"	Mario DeJesús	4:17
4.	"La Rueda"	Victor Manuel Mato	6:24
5.	"Te Estoy Estudiando"	Raúl Marrero	4:52
6.	"Tu con El"	Eduardo Franco	5:00
7.	"Como una Estrella"	Eduardo Franco	4:44
8.	"Lo Dudo"	Manuel Alejandro	5:12
9.	"Primero Fui Yo"	Joaquin Bedolla	4:52
10.	"La Vecina"	Raúl Marrero	5:07
11.	"No, Que No"	Zulma Angélica	4:46
12.	"Alejate de Mi"	Jorge Ayala	5:51
13.	"Esta Cobardia"	Gloria González	5:42
14.	"Quiero Llenarte"	Paco Cepero / Francisco Martinez	4:31

== Charts ==
Chart (1987)	Peak position
U.S. Billboard Tropical Albums	1

== See also ==
- List of Billboard Tropical Albums number ones from the 1980s
