= 30 Aniversario =

Studio album by Tommy Olivencia
- Released: 1987
- Genre: Salsa
- Label: Rodven Records

Tommy Olivencia chronology
Ayer, Hoy, Mañana, y Siempre (1986)	30 Aniversario (1987)	El Jeque (1988)

30 Aniversario (trigésimo aniversario) is a 1987 studio album by Tommy Olivencia and his band. As the title implies, the album was made to commemorate the 30th anniversary of Tommy Olivencia as a bandleader.

== Singles ==
Three singles were produced from the album, two of which charted on Billboard Hot Latin Tracks. The lead singer for the first-two songs was Hector Tricoche while Paquito Acosta provided the lead vocals for the third single.

- "Lobo Domesticado" (Domestic Wolf) was the first single released on the album which reached the top ton on Hot Latin Tracks peaking on #6. The song is a cover of Mexican singer-songwriter of Joan Sebastian who released the single the same year which peaked #37 on Hot Latin Tracks.
- "No Me Tires La Primera Piedra" (Don't Cast The First Stone) was the second single released from the album and peaked on #13 on Hot Latin Tracks.
- "Lapiz de Carmin" (Carmine Lipstick) was the third single released from the album.

== Track listing ==
No.	Title	Writer(s)	Length
1.	"Lobo Domesticado"	Joan Sebastían	4:50
2.	"No Me Tires la Primera Piedra"	Franco, Franco, Velazquez	4:56
3.	"Volveré"	Anibal Castillo, Jesús Diaz, Sergio Diaz Fachielli	3:39
4.	"El Santero"	D.R.	4:48
5.	"Lápiz de Carmin"	Paco Cepero	4:33
6.	"Contigo es Distinto"	Gloria González	4:15
7.	"Señora"	Rafael Manjarres	4:09
8.	"Medley Aniversario"	Tite Curel Alonso, Ramirez	5:25

== Personnel ==
- Paquito Acosta – vocals
- Hector Tricoche – vocals

== Chart position ==
Year	Chart	Album	Peak
1987	U.S. Billboard Tropical/Salsa	30 Aniversario	1

== Reception ==
Professional ratings
Review scores
Source	Rating
Allmusic	4.5/5 stars

José A. Estévez Jr. of Allmusic gave the album a positive review praising the vocalists, production, and the expression of romanticism.

== See also ==
- List of number-one Billboard Tropical Albums from the 1980s
