= Amame =

Amame (Love Me) may refer to:

- Amame, 1988 album by La Mafia
- Ámame (album), 1989 album by El Gran Combo de Puerto Rico
- "Ámame" (song), 1993 song by Selena
- "Ámame", a 2003 song by Alexandre Pires
- Amame, 2023 album by Mari Boine
- Ámame (TV series)
