= Soy el Mismo (Eddie Santiago album) =

Soy el mismo

Studio album by Eddie Santiago
- Released: 1991
- Genre: Salsa
- Label: EMI/Capitol

Eddie Santiago chronology
New Wave Salsa (1989)	Soy el mismo (1991)	Intensamente (1993)

Singles from Soy el mismo
- 1. "Me faltas tu" Released: November 1991; 2. "Hasta aqui te fui fiel" Released: February 1992; 3. "Deseos" Released: August 1992

Professional ratings
Review scores
Source	Rating
Allmusic	3/5 stars

Soy el mismo (I am the Same) is the sixth studio album recorded by Puerto Rican singer Eddie Santiago released in 1991. The album became his sixth number-one album on the Billboard Tropical Albums chart.

== Track listing ==
This information adapted from Allmusic.

No.	Title	Length
1.	"Me faltas tú"
2.	"Yo queria ser fiel"
3.	"Bella y cruel"
4.	"A escondidas de todos"
5.	"Hasta aquí te fui fiel"
6.	"Te amo, te amo"
7.	"Deseos"
8.	"Soy el mismo"

== Chart performance ==
Chart (1991)	Peak position
U.S. Billboard Tropical Albums	1

== See also ==
- List of number-one Billboard Tropical Albums from the 1990s
