= Solista pero no solo =

Solista Pero No Solo

Studio album by Frankie Ruiz
- Released: 1985
- Genre: Salsa
- Label: Rodven Records

Frankie Ruiz chronology
Solista Pero No Solo (1985)	Voy Pa' Encima (1987)

Solista Pero No Solo (Soloist but Not Alone) is the debut album by Puerto Rican salsa singer Frankie Ruiz following his departure from Tommy Olivencia's band. Notable hits from the album include "Ahora Me Toca a Mi," "Esta Cobardía," "Tu Con El," "La Cura," and "Amor de un Momento". In 2024, Rolling Stone writer Ernesto Lechner listed it as one of the best salsa albums of all-time, ranking it #39 out of #50. Solista pero no solo won LP of the Year in the Tropical/Salsa category at the 1987 Bravo Awards.

== Track listing ==
1. "Ahora Me Toca a Mí" - 4:20
2. "Esta Cobardía" - 5:40
3. "Como le Gusta a Usted" - 4:12
4. "Tú Con Él" - 5:00
5. "La Cura" - 4:55
6. "El Camionero" - 5:22
7. "Si Esa Mujer Me Dice Que Sí" - 4:28
8. "Amor de Un Momento" - 4:41

== Charts ==
=== Weekly charts ===
Weekly chart performance for Solista pero no solo
Chart (1986)	Peak position
US Tropical Albums (Billboard)	1

=== Year-end charts ===
1986 year-end chart performance for Solista pero no solo
Chart (1986)	Position
US Tropical Albums (Billboard)	1

== Reception ==
Professional ratings
Review scores
Source	Rating
Allmusic	4/5 stars

José A. Estévez Jr. of Allmusic gave the album a positive review his debut album praising that it "has attitude, fun, and Ruiz's joyful vocal skills to boot".

== See also ==
- List of number-one Billboard Tropical Albums from the 1980s
