= Voy pa' encima =

Voy Pa' Encima

Studio album by Frankie Ruiz
- Released: 1987
- Genre: Salsa
- Label: Rodven Records

Frankie Ruiz chronology
Solista Pero No Solo (1985)	Voy Pa' Encima (1987)	Historia Musical de Frankie Ruiz (1987)

Voy Pa' Encima (I'm Going for It) is the second studio album by Frankie Ruiz as a solo artist. It became his number-one record on the Billboard Tropical Albums.

== Singles ==
Two singles produced from the album charted on the Billboard Hot Latin Tracks.

- "Desnúdate Mujer" (Get Naked Woman) was the first single released on the album peaking on #6.
- "Quiero Llenarte" (I Want to Fill You) was the second single released from the album and peaked on #11 on Hot Latin Tracks.

== Track listing ==
1. "Quiero Llenarte" - 4:30
2. "Si No Te Hubieras Ido" - 4:50
3. "Desnúdate Mujer" - 4:48
4. "Mujeres" - 4:06
5. "No Me Hables Mal de Ella" - 4:58
6. "Impossible Amor" - 4:57
7. "Quiero Verte" - 4:28
8. "Voy Pa' Encima" - 4:14

== Charts ==
=== Weekly charts ===
Weekly chart performance for Voy pa' encima
Chart (1987)	Peak position
US Tropical Albums (Billboard)	1

=== Year-end charts ===
1987 year-end chart performance for Voy pa' encima
Chart (1987)	Position
US Tropical Albums (Billboard)	4

== Reception ==
Professional ratings
Review scores
Source	Rating
Allmusic	4.5/5 stars

José A. Estévez Jr. of Allmusic compared the Voy Pa' Encima to the previous album, Solista Pero No Solo, by calling the former "even more dynamic". Estévez praised the production from Julio Cesar Delgado from Rodven Records.

== See also ==
- List of number-one Billboard Tropical Albums from the 1980s
