= New Wave Salsa =

Studio album by Eddie Santiago
- Released: July 11, 1989
- Genre: Salsa
- Length: 31:19
- Label: Rodven Records
- Producer: Julio Cesar Delgado, Frank Torres

Eddie Santiago chronology
Invasión de la Privacidad (1988)	New Wave Salsa (1989)	El Rey de la Salsa Romántica (1990)

Singles from New Wave Salsa
- 1. "Me hiciste caer" Released: March 1989

Professional ratings
Review scores
Source	Rating
Allmusic	4.5/5 stars

New Wave Salsa is the fourth studio album recorded by Puerto Rican singer Eddie Santiago released in 1989. The album became his fourth number-one album on the Billboard Tropical Albums chart.

== Track listing ==
This information adapted from Allmusic.

No.	Title	Writer(s)	Length
1.	"Una nueva oportunidad"	Eddie Santiago	4:13
2.	"Jugue y perdí"	Fausto Parra	4:22
3.	"Me hiciste caer"	Eddie Santiago	3:42
4.	"Voy a robarme una luna"	Pedro Azael	4:00
5.	"Odiándote y sin entender"	Pedro Azael	3:45
6.	"Lo único importante"	Pedro Azael	3:46
7.	"Let It Be Now"	Eddie Santiago	3:30
8.	"Vete"	Eddie Santiago	4:01

== Personnel ==
- Keyboards - Amaury Lopez
- Bongos - Celso Clemente
- Piano - Domingo Garcia
- Composer, Primary Artist, Background Vocals - Eddie Santiago
- Arranger - Ernesto Sanchez
- Composer - Fausto Parra
- Producer - Frank Torres
- Marimba, Background Vocals - Hecor Perez
- Assistant Coordinator - Iris Pagan
- Guitar - Ito Serrano
- Bass Guitar - Jesus R. Torres
- Congas - Jimmy Morales
- Photography - Jorge Velazquez
- Director, Mixing, Producer - Julio Cesar Delgado
- Piano - Lenny Prieto
- Background Vocals - Nino Segarra
- Composer - Pedro Azael
- Bass - Pedro Pérez
- Keyboards, Programming - Ramón Sánchez
- Timbales - Santiago "Chago" Martínez
- Arranger - Tommy Villarini
- Engineer, Mixing - Vinny Urrutia

== Chart performance ==
Chart (1989)	Peak position
U.S. Billboard Tropical Albums	1

== See also ==
- List of number-one Billboard Tropical Albums from the 1990s
