= Chantelle (band) =

Merengue musical group from Puerto Rico

- Origin: Puerto Rico
- Genres: Merengue
- Years active: 1988–1993
- Past members: Olga Tañón; Sandra Torres; Daly Fontánez

Chantelle was a popular all-female merengue musical group formed in 1988 in Puerto Rico, composed of members Olga Tañón, Sandra Torres and Daly Fontanez.

Chantelle's biggest hit was a cover of Juan Gabriel's "Queriendo y No" ("Wanting and Not Wanting") in 1989. The trio performed the song at the 1990 Premio Lo Nuestro Awards and won the award for "Tropical New Artist of the Year". Of the three women in the group, Tañón later became the most successful after leaving Chantelle in 1992 to launch a solo career, which led to the group's eventual disbanding.

== Discography ==
- Merengue Con Un Toque De Clase (1989)
- Cada Vez Con Más Clase (1990)
- Contigo Siempre... (1992)
- ¡Qué Bien! (1993)
