= 25 Aniversario: 1962 - 1987 =

25th Anniversary 1962-1987

Greatest hits album by El Gran Combo de Puerto Rico
- Released: 1987
- Genre: Salsa
- Label: Combo

Professional ratings
Review scores
Source	Rating
Allmusic	4/5 stars

25th Anniversary 1962-1987 is a greatest hits album by Puerto Rican salsa band, El Gran Combo de Puerto Rico. The album became the group's third number-one album on the Billboard Tropical Albums chart. The album was released to commemorate the band's 25th anniversary. The compilation album received a positive review from AllMusic's José A. Estévez Jr who felt it would be a great start for newer fans.

== Track listing ==
This information adapted from AllMusic.

Disc one
No.	Title	Writer(s)	Length
1.	"Mima"	Tito Henriquez	4:21
2.	"Maldito Callo"	Claudio Ferrer	4:53
3.	"Esos Ojitos Negros"		4:30
4.	"Estas Liquidao"		3:54
5.	"Mundy Baja"	Kito Vélez	4:14
6.	"Serrana"	Roberto Angleró	4:38
7.	"A Ti Te Pasa Algo"		4:07
8.	"Dos Coplas y un Ole"	Roberto Angleró	4:33
9.	"Sube Nene, Sube"	Rafael Ithier	3:36
10.	"Tiembla"	Claudio Ferrer	3:06
11.	"Estas Equivocada"	Osvaldo Farrés	5:38
12.	"El Barbero Loco"	Mariano Mercerón	4:30

Disc two
No.	Title	Writer(s)	Length
1.	"El Son de Santurce"		3:36
2.	"Un Verano en Nueva York"	Justi Barreto	4:56
3.	"No Me Olvides Mulata"	Rafael Ithier	3:40
4.	"Que Falta de Respeto"		3:12
5.	"La Clave"	Agustín Lara	3:50
6.	"Nido de Amor"	Octavio Daza	4:28
7.	"Te Regalo el Corazon"		4:05
8.	"Timbalero"	Rafael Ithier	4:21
9.	"Telefono"	Perin Vazquez	5:03
10.	"Y No Hago Mas Na"	Chiquitín García	5:00
11.	"Azuquita Pal Cafe"	Perin Vazquez	4:10
12.	"No Hay Cama Pa'Tanta Gente"	Flor Morales Ramos	4:32
13.	"Garantia"	Charlie Donato	4:02

== Charts ==
Chart (1987)	Peak position
U.S. Billboard Tropical Albums	1

== See also ==
- List of Billboard Tropical Albums number ones from the 1980s
