= Invasión de la Privacidad =

Invasion de la privacidad

Studio album by Eddie Santiago
- Released: October 25, 1988
- Genre: Salsa
- Length: 36:44
- Label: Rodven Records

Eddie Santiago chronology
Sigo Atrevido (1987)	Invasion de la privacidad (1988)	New Wave Salsa (1989)

Singles from Invasion de la privacidad
- 1. "Tu me haces falta" Released: 1988; 2. "Antidoto y veneno" Released: 1988; 3. "Me fallaste" Released: 1989; 4. "Mia" Released: 1989; 5. "Para que vuelves" Released: 1989

Professional ratings
Review scores
Source	Rating
Allmusic	4.5/5 stars

Invasion de la privacidad (Invasion of Privacy) is the third studio album recorded by Puerto Rican singer Eddie Santiago released in 1988. The album became his third number-one album on the Billboard Tropical Albums chart.

== Track listing ==
This information adapted from CD Universe.

No.	Title	Length
1.	"Antídoto y veneno"	5:16
2.	"Tú me haces falta"	4:39
3.	"Amor de cada día"	3:59
4.	"Mía"	4:41
5.	"Me fallaste"	5:02
6.	"Para que vuelves"	4:42
7.	"Te equivocas"	4:18
8.	"Mañana"	4:07

== Chart performance ==
Chart (1988)	Peak position
U.S. Billboard Tropical Albums	1

== See also ==
- List of number-one Billboard Tropical Albums from the 1980s
