= Atrevido y diferente =

1986 debut studio by Eddie Santiago

Atrevido y Diferente

Studio album by Eddie Santiago
- Released: October 21, 1986
- Recorded: 1986
- Studio: V.U. Recording Studios (Santurce, Puerto Rico)
- Genre: Salsa
- Length: 36:08
- Language: Spanish
- Label: TH-Rodven
- Producer: Frank Torres · Tony Moreno (Exec.)

Eddie Santiago chronology
Atrevido y Diferente (1986)	Sigo Atrevido (1987)

Atrevido y Diferente (English: Daring and Different) is the debut solo studio album recorded by Puerto Rican-American salsa singer-songwriter Eddie Santiago. The album witch released by TH-Rodven in late 1986 (see 1986 in music), it was cited as one of the turning points of the salsa genre into salsa romantica.

== Singles ==
Two singles were released from the album that charted on the Hot Latin Tracks.

- Nadie Mejor Que Tu (Nobody Better Than You) was the lead single released from the album and charted #16 on Hot Latin Tracks.
- Qué Locura de Enamorarme de Ti (What Madness to Fall in love with you) was the second and final single released from the album and charted #13 on the Hot Latin Tracks.

== Track listing ==
No.	Title	Writer(s)	Length
1.	"Tú Me Quemas"	Luis Ángel Márquez	5:01
2.	"Volcán de Amor"	Santiago Delgado	4:24
3.	"Nadie Mejor Que Tú"	Luis Ángel Márquez	3:51
4.	"De Profesión... Tu Amante"	Marquito Héctor Sotelo	4:30
5.	"Qué Locura Enamorarme de Ti"	Alejandro Vezzani	5:09
6.	"Secretos"	Eddie Santiago	4:19
7.	"Quiero Amarte en la Yerba"	Luis Ferri; Lauren; Julio Santiago	5:09
8.	"Se Acabó"	Eddie Santiago	4:02
Total length:			36:08

== Personnel ==
- Composer - Alejandro Vezzani
- Bongos - Carlos Martin Rodriguez
- Banjo - Carlos Rondan
- Timbales - Chago Martínez
- Piano - César Concepción
- Composer, Primary Artist, Vocals - Eddie Santiago
- Percussion - Hecor Perez
- Composer - Héctor Sotelo
- Congas - Jimmy Morales
- Composer - Julio Santiago
- Composer - Luis Angel
- Composer - Marquito
- Composer - Santiago Delgado

== Chart position ==
The album peaked #1 on the tropical album charts and remained #1 for 10 consecutive weeks.

Year	Chart	Album	Peak
1987	U.S. Billboard Tropical/Salsa Albums	Atrevido y Diferente	1

== Reception ==
Professional ratings
Review scores
Source	Rating
Allmusic	4.5/5 stars

John Storm Roberts of Allmusic declared Atrevido y Diferente to be "the biggest name in the newish salsa-romantica vein" and pointed out the rise of salsa romantica.

== See also ==
- List of number-one Billboard Tropical Albums from the 1980s
