= Innovations (album) =

Studio album by El Gran Combo de Puerto Rico
- Released: 1985
- Genre: Salsa
- Length: 37:48
- Label: Combo Records

El Gran Combo de Puerto Rico chronology
In Alaska: Breaking the Ice (1984)	Innovations (1985)	Y Su Pueblo (1986)

Innovations is a 1985 studio album released by Puerto Rican salsa group, El Gran Combo de Puerto Rico. It was the first number-one album on the Billboard Tropical Albums chart, established in June 1985.

== Track listing ==
No.	Title	Writer(s)	Length
1.	"Juan Cabeza Dura"	Tommy Sánchez	4:38
2.	"Camino de Amapolas"	Gabriel Romero	4:20
3.	"No Me Olvides"	Perín Vásquez	4:55
4.	"Resignación"	Benjamín Muñiz	4:57
5.	"Prosigue"	Tommy Sánchez	4:57
6.	"Años"	Pablo Milanés	4:55
7.	"Nunca Es Tarde"	Mike Amadeo	3:50
8.	"La Loma del Tamarindo"	Wiso Santiago	5:16

== Critical reception ==
Professional ratings
Review scores
Source	Rating
AllMusic	3/5 stars

José A. Estévez, Jr. of AllMusic criticized the lack of novelties while stating Juan Cabeza Dura, No Me Olvides and La Loma del Tamarindo were "servicable".

== Charts ==
Chart (1985)	Peak position
US Billboard Tropical Albums	1

== See also ==
- List of Billboard Tropical Albums number ones from the 1980s
