= Tierra de Nadie (Ana Gabriel album) =

Tierra de nadie

Studio album by Ana Gabriel
- Released: 15 August 1988
- Genre: Pop
- Label: CBS
- Producer: Mariano Pérez Batista

Ana Gabriel chronology
Pecado Original (1987)	Tierra de nadie (1988)	Quién como tú (1989)

Singles from Tierra de Nadie
- 1. "Simplemente Amigos" Released: 3 July 1988; 2. "Es el Amor Quien Llega" Released: 17 August 1988; 3. "No Digas No (Não Diga Adeus)" Released: 19 September 1988; 4. "Soledad (Solidão)" Released: 11 October 1988

Tierra de Nadie (English No man's land) is the fourth studio album by Mexican pop singer Ana Gabriel. It was released under CBS Records on August 15, 1988. She achieved international recognition with this album, topping the Billboard Latin Pop Albums chart for 73 weeks and selling four million copies worldwide. The album was given a Premio Lo Nuestro award for "Pop Album of the Year" in 1990.

== Track listing ==
Tracks:

1. Simplemente Amigos
2. Es el Amor Quien Llega
3. Soledad (Solidão)
4. Por Tí
5. Voy Por Tí
6. Tierra de Nadie
7. Contigo
8. No Digas No (Não Diga Adeus)
9. Que Puedes Hacer Por Mí
10. Recuerdos

== Commercial performance ==
Tierra de Nadie reached number one on the Billboard Latin Pop Albums chart.

== Certifications ==
Certifications for Tierra de Nadie
Region	Certification	Certified units/sales
Mexico (AMPROFON)	2× Platinum+Gold	600,000^{‡}
^{‡} Sales+streaming figures based on certification alone.

== See also ==
- List of number-one Billboard Latin Pop Albums from the 1990s
