= Ámame (album) =

Studio album by El Gran Combo de Puerto Rico
- Released: May 25, 1989
- Genre: Salsa
- Label: Rodven Records
- Producer: Frank Torrest

El Gran Combo de Puerto Rico chronology
Romántico y Sabroso (1988)	Ámame (1989)	Latin Up (1990)

Singles from Ámame
- 1. "Ámame" Released: April 17, 1989; 2. "Aguacero" Released: July 24, 1989; 3. "Otra Vez Enamorado" Released: November 6, 1989

Professional ratings
Review scores
Source	Rating
AllMusic	4/5 stars

¡Ámame! (Love Me) is the 1989 studio album released by the Puerto Rican salsa band, El Gran Combo de Puerto Rico. The album became the group's fifth number-one album on the Billboard Tropical Albums chart.

== Track listing ==
This information adapted from AllMusic.

No.	Title	Writer(s)	Length
1.	"Ámame"	Palmer Hernández	5:27
2.	"Otra Vez Enamorado"	Marisela Tavárez	4:49
3.	"Tu Mirada"	Rafael Negrón	3:58
4.	"Cenizas"	Rafael Negrón	4:46
5.	"Aguacero"	Raquel Velásquez	4:13
6.	"Te Seguiré"	Mario Díaz	4:51
7.	"Brindis a la Vida"	Raquel Velásquez	4:58
8.	"Todo Bien"	Benjamín Muñiz	4:16

== Personnel ==
- Assistant Engineer, Assistant Executive Producer - Bobby Rodriguez
- Choir/Chorus, Coro, Vocals - Charlie Aponte
- Timbales - Cuqui Santos
- Saxophone - Eddie Perez
- Primary Artist - El Gran Combo de Puerto Rico
- Arranger, Producer - Ernesto Sanchez
- Art Direction - Evi Marchany
- Trombone - Fanny Ceballos
- Bajo Sexto, Bass - Fred Rivera
- Mixing, Saxophone - Freddy Miranda
- Coordination, Make-Up - Iris Pagan
- Choir/Chorus, Coro, Vocals - Jerry Rivas
- Photography - Jorge Velazquez
- Bongos - Jose Miguel Laboy
- Arranger - Louis García
- Composer - Mario Diaz
- Composer - Marisela Tavarez
- Congas - Miguel Torres
- Art Direction - Milue Velasquez
- Composer - Palmer Hernandez
- Choir/Chorus, Vocals - Papo Rosario
- Engineer, Mastering, Mixing - Papo Sanchez
- Photography - Pedro
- Arranger, Director, Mixing, Musical Director, Piano, Producer - Rafael Ithier
- Executive Producer - Ralph Cartagena
- Trumpet - Taty Maldonado
- Trumpet - Victor Rodriguez

== Charts ==
Chart (1989)	Peak position
U.S. Billboard Tropical Albums	1

== See also ==
- List of Billboard Tropical Albums number ones from the 1980s
