= Orquesta La Solución =

Puerto Rican salsa band

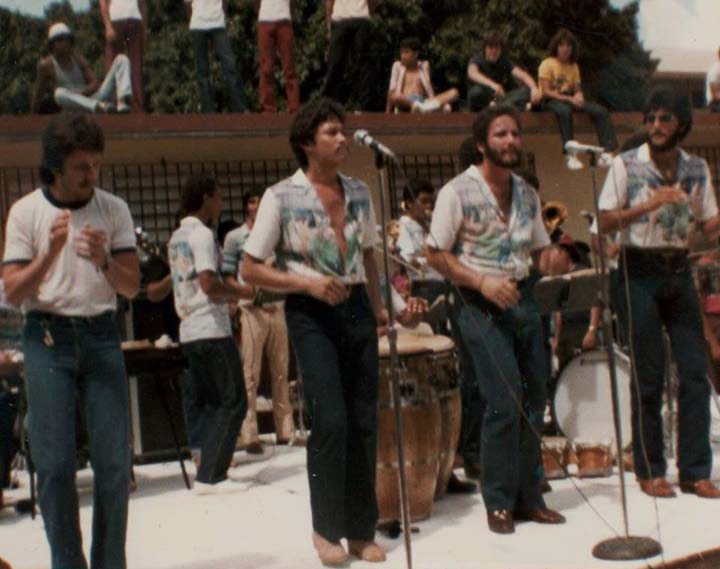
Orquesta La Solucion with Frankie Ruiz

Orquesta La Solución is a Puerto Rican trombone-based salsa band, founded by bassist Roberto Rivera in 1973.

The band's singers included Frankie Ruiz who started a solo career after hits with the band "La Rueda" and "Chiquito Corazoncito." Band instrumentalists have included Israel Tanenbaum. The band recorded for the Venezuelan T.H. Records, later known as TH-Rodven Records and finally Rodven Records until 1991.

== Discography ==
- "La Juma De Ayer" (Performance records, 1975) Vocals: Esteban "Tato Rico" Ramírez & Jaime "Megüi" Rivera.
- "Roberto Rivera & La Solución" (Performance records, 1979) (First album with Frankie Ruiz), later reedited as "Frankie Ruiz y La Solución"
- "Orquesta La Solución" also known as "La Rueda" (LAD records (Later T.H. Records), 1980)
- La Solución! also known as "Una Canita Aire" (LAD - T.H. Records, 1981)
- Orquesta La Solución (LAD - T.H. Records, 1982)
- La Solución (T.H. Records, 1983)
- Una Canita Más (T.H. Records, 1985)
- Brindemos (T.H. Records, 1986)
- Buena Pesca (TH-Rodven, 1987)
- El Original De Puerto Rico (TH-Rodven, 1989)
- Clasico (TH-Rodven, 1991)
- A Bailar Pa Dentro (Paradisc Records - BMG Music International, 1993)
- Alcanzar Una Estrella (AVL Records, 1999)
- 30 Aniversario (SMG Productions, 2005)
- A Través Del Tiempo (Puerto Rico Records, 2008)
- Refreshing (Eddie Ramos Productions, 2012)
- Viajero del Tiempo (Jokha Management, Expecting time frame 2014)
