= Y su pueblo =

Y Su Pueblo

Studio album by El Gran Combo de Puerto Rico
- Released: 1985
- Genre: Salsa
- Length: 36:57
- Label: Combo Records

El Gran Combo de Puerto Rico chronology
Innovations (1985)	Y Su Pueblo (1985)	Romántico y Sabroso (1988)

Y Su Pueblo (And His People) is the 1985 studio album released by Puerto Rican salsa group, El Gran Combo de Puerto Rico. The album became the group's second album to top the Billboard Tropical Albums chart succeeding the group's previous album, Innovations.

== Track listing ==
No.	Title	Writer(s)	Length
1.	"Lírica Borinqueña"	Johnny Ortiz	4:31
2.	"Indecisión"	Ángel Santiago	4:27
3.	"Total Pa' Qué"	Félix Castrillón	4:42
4.	"Por Más Que Quiera"	Taty Maldonado	4:32
5.	"Garantía"	Charlie Donato	4:07
6.	"Por Ella"	Esteban Montaño	5:32
7.	"Le Dicen Papá"	Perín Vásquez	4:24
8.	"Nunca Fui"	Ricardo Reyes Dutari	4:19

== Critical reception ==
Professional ratings
Review scores
Source	Rating
AllMusic	3/5 stars

José A. Estévez Jr. of AllMusic felt that the album was indifferent from the previous albums and gave the album a mixed review. On the hand, he praised the band for "swinging with nice material".

== Chart performance ==
Chart (1987)	Peak position
US Billboard Tropical Albums	1

== See also ==
- List of Billboard Tropical Albums number ones from the 1980s
