= Con Todos los Sentidos =

Studio album by Braulio
- Released: 1988
- Genre: Pop Latino
- Label: CBS Discos
- Producer: Braulio García

Braulio chronology
Lo Bello y lo Prohibido (1986)	Con Todos los Sentidos (1988)	Cortar Por lo Sano (1989)

Con Todos los Sentidos (Eng.: "With All My Senses") is a studio album released by Spanish singer-songwriter Braulio in 1988. This album became his second number-one set on the Billboard Latin Pop Albums chart. The album produced six singles, three of which reached the top five on the Hot Latin Tracks chart: "Con Las Manos en la Mesa", "El Vicio de tu Boca", "Un Tiempo Para Los Nosotros", "Una Mujer Como Tu" and "Cuando Se Acaba La Magia". The album was nominated for Pop Album of the Year at the 1st Lo Nuestro Music Awards.

== Track listing ==
All tracks are written by Braulio García.

No.	Title	Length
1.	"El Vicio de Tu Boca"
2.	"Una Mujer Como Tu"
3.	"Con Las Manos en la Mesa"
4.	"Cuando Se Acaba La Magia"
5.	"Gato x Liebre"
6.	"Amandote, Soñandote"
7.	"Tanto Amor Traciando"
8.	"Casi Puedo Ser Tu Padre"
9.	"En la Cima y en la Orilla"
10.	"Balada Para un Don Nadie"
11.	"Un Tiempo Para Nosotros"

== Chart performance ==
Chart (1988)	Peak position
US Latin Pop Albums (Billboard)	1

== See also ==
- List of Billboard Latin Pop Albums number ones from the 1980s
