= List of number-one albums of 1987 (Spain) =

This list of number-one albums of 1987 in Spain is derived from the Top 100 España record chart published weekly by PROMUSICAE (Productores de Música de España), a non-profit organization composed by Spain and multinational record companies. This association tracks record sales (physical and digital) in Spain.

== Albums ==
Week	Chart Date	Album	Artist
1	January 5	Con Toda El Alma	Nana Mouskouri
2	January 12	True Blue	Madonna
3	January 19	Con Toda El Alma	Nana Mouskouri
4	January 26	Gaudi	The Alan Parsons Project
5	February 2	The Final Countdown	Europe
6	February 9	The Final Countdown	Europe
7	February 16	The Final Countdown	Europe
8	February 23	The Final Countdown	Europe
9	March 2	The Final Countdown	Europe
10	March 9	The Final Countdown	Europe
11	March 16	The Final Countdown	Europe
12	March 23	The Joshua Tree	U2
13	March 30	The Joshua Tree	U2
14	April 6	The Final Countdown	Europe
15	April 13	Communards	Communards
16	April 20	The Final Countdown	Europe
17	April 27	The Final Countdown	Europe
18	May 4	The Final Countdown	Europe
19	May 11	The Final Countdown	Europe
20	May 18	Un hombre solo	Julio Iglesias
21	May 25	Un hombre solo	Julio Iglesias
22	June 1	Un hombre solo	Julio Iglesias
23	June 8	Un hombre solo	Julio Iglesias
24	June 15	Un hombre solo	Julio Iglesias
25	June 22	The Joshua Tree	U2
26	June 29	The Joshua Tree	U2
27	July 6	Communards	Communards
28	July 13	The Joshua Tree	U2
29	July 20	The Joshua Tree	U2
30	July 27	The Joshua Tree	U2
31	August 3	Communards	Communards
32	August 10	Communards	Communards
33	August 17	Communards	Communards
34	August 24	Communards	Communards
35	August 31	Communards	Communards
36	September 7	Communards	Communards
37	September 14	La canción de Juan Perro	Radio Futura
38	September 21	Bienaventurados	Joan Manuel Serrat
39	October 1	Bienaventurados	Joan Manuel Serrat
40	October 8	Bad	Michael Jackson
41	October 15	Bienaventurados	Joan Manuel Serrat
42	October 22	Bienaventurados	Joan Manuel Serrat
43	October 29	Tunnel of Love	Bruce Springsteen
44	November 5	Tunnel of Love	Bruce Springsteen
45	November 12	Tunnel of Love	Bruce Springsteen
46	November 19	Tunnel of Love	Bruce Springsteen
47	November 26	Tunnel of Love	Bruce Springsteen
48	December 3	Tunnel of Love	Bruce Springsteen
49	December 10	Tempo D'Italia	Luis Cobos
50	December 17	Tempo D'Italia	Luis Cobos
51	December 24	Tempo D'Italia	Luis Cobos
52	December 31	Tempo D'Italia	Luis Cobos

== See also ==
- List of number-one singles of 1987 (Spain)
