= Si Me Recuerdas =

Studio album by Los Bukis
- Released: February 3, 1988
- Recorded: November 1987 - February 1988
- Genre: Grupero
- Length: 38:51
- Label: Fonovisa
- Producer: Marco Antonio Solís

Los Bukis chronology
Me Volvi a Acordar de Ti (1986)	Si Me Recuerdas (1988)	Y Para Siempre (1989)

Professional ratings
Review scores
Source	Rating
AllMusic	3/5 stars

Si Me Recuerdas (Eng.: "If You Remember Me") is the eleventh studio album released by Los Bukis in 1988, and was nominated for a Grammy Award for Best Mexican-American Album.

Currently, this album is unavailable on streaming services in the United States.

== Track listing ==
All songs written and composed by Marco Antonio Solís

No.	Title	Length
1.	"Si Me Recuerdas"	4:36
2.	"Y Ahora Te Vas"	3:57
3.	"Te Voy a Amar"	3:30
4.	"Consíguete un Nuevo Viejo"	3:06
5.	"Tus Mentiras"	4:48
6.	"Qué Mala"	3:20
7.	"Cómo Dejar de Amarte"	3:22
8.	"Si Vieras Cuanto"	3:25
9.	"Adiós Querida Esposa"	3:57
10.	"Felicito"	4:44

== Chart performance ==
Chart (1988)	Peak position
US Billboard Latin Pop Albums	6
