= Sigo Atrevido =

1987 studio album by Eddie Santiago

Studio album by Eddie Santiago
- Released: November 17, 1987
- Recorded: 1987
- Studio: V.U. Recording Studios (Santurce, Puerto Rico)
- Genre: Salsa
- Length: 35:14
- Language: Spanish
- Label: TH-Rodven
- Producer: Frank Torres

Eddie Santiago chronology
Atrevido y Diferente (1986)	Sigo Atrevido (1987)	Invasión de la Privacidad (1988)

Professional ratings
Review scores
Source	Rating
Allmusic	5/5 stars

Sigo Atrevido (English: I'm Still Daring) is the second studio album recorded by Puerto Rican-American salsa singer-songwriter Eddie Santiago. The album witch released by TH-Rodven in late 1987 and topped the tropical charts throughout the first half of 1988. The album received nomination for Grammy Award for Best Tropical Latin Performance and another nomination for a Lo Nuestro Award for Tropical Album of the Year.

== Singles ==
Four singles were produced from the album that charted on the Hot Latin Tracks.

- "Lluvia" (Rain) was the lead single released from the album and charted #4 on Hot Latin Tracks. This single became the highest peaking salsa song of the 1980s.
- "Insaciable" (Insatiable) was the second single released from the album and charted #34 on the Hot Latin Tracks.
- "Hagámoslo" (Let's Do It) was the third single released from the album and charted #31 on the Hot Latin Tracks.
- "Todo Empezó" (It All Started) was the fourth and final single released from the album and charted #19 on the Hot Latin Tracks.

== Track listing ==
No.	Title	Writer(s)	Length
1.	"Lluvia"	Luis Ángel Márquez	4:58
2.	"Insaciable"	C. Ferrer; M. Nathalie; S. González	4:31
3.	"Hagámoslo"	David Pabón	4:00
4.	"Vida de Amantes"	Eddie Santiago	4:05
5.	"Momento de Amor"	N. Urquiza; C. Bissio	4:52
6.	"Déjame Amarte"	Eddie Santiago	4:00
7.	"Todo Empezó"	Luis Ángel Márquez	4:55
8.	"Cabalgada"	Roberto Carlos; Erasmo Carlos; B.H. McCloskey	4:07
Total length:			35:14

== Personnel ==
- Background Vocals - Ana Baiana
- T-Bone - Angelo Torres
- T-Bone - Antonio Vazquez
- Bongos - Baby Serrano
- Timbales - Chago Martínez
- Composer - Claudio Ferrer
- T-Bone - Cuto Soto
- Piano - César Concepción
- Composer - David Pabon
- Composer, Primary Artist, Background Vocals - Eddie Santiago
- Producer - Frank Torres
- Engineer, Background Vocals - Jimmy Diaz
- Congas - Jimmy Morales
- Director - Julio Cesar Delgado
- Composer - Luis Angel
- Composer - Luis Angel Marquez
- Composer - Luis Gómez-Escolar
- Composer - Nicolás Urquiza
- Background Vocals - Nino Segarra
- Bajo Sexto - Pedro Pérez

== Chart and sales ==
Year	Chart	Album	Peak
1988	U.S. Billboard Tropical/Salsa Albums	Sigo Atrevido	1

Region	Certification	Certified units/sales
United States	—	147,000

== See also ==
- List of number-one Billboard Tropical Albums from the 1980s
