= Hansel & Raúl =

Cuban musical duo

- Origin: Cuba
- Genres: Charanga
- Past members: Hansel Enrique Martínez; Raúl Alfonso

Hansel & Raúl were a Cuban musical duo consisting of singers Hansel Enrique Martínez and Raúl Alfonso. The two met while as members of Charanga 76. After leaving the group in 1980, the two formed as a musical duo. They reached number one on the Billboard Tropical Albums chart with their album, La Magia de Hansel & Raúl (1985). The album contained the hit single "Maria Teresa y Danilo". In 1990, the duo received a Lo Nuestro nomination for Tropical/Salsa Group of the Year.
