= Romántico y Sabroso =

Studio album by El Gran Combo de Puerto Rico
- Released: August 1988
- Recorded: March 1988 – April 1988
- Genre: Salsa
- Length: 36:57
- Label: Combo Records

El Gran Combo de Puerto Rico chronology
25 Aniversario: 1962–1987 (1987)	Romántico y Sabroso (1988)	Ámame (1989)

Romántico y Sabroso ("Romantic and Delicious") is the 1988 studio album released by Puerto Rican salsa group, El Gran Combo de Puerto Rico. The album is considered El Gran Combo's first release dominated by the distinct subgenre known as salsa romantica. It was the last album were Edgardo Morales played the drums.

== Singles ==
Three singles produced from the album charted on the Billboard Hot Latin Tracks.

- Cupido ("Cupid") was the first single released from the album and reached the top ten on Hot Latin Tracks peaking on #8.
- Potro Amarrao was the second single released from the album and reached #28 on the Hot Latin Tracks.
- Quince Años was the third single released from the album and reached #26 on the Hot Latin Tracks.

== Track listing ==
No.	Title	Length
1.	"Quince Años"	4:08
2.	"Potro Amarrao"	4:23
3.	"Regresa Ya"	4:16
4.	"Carta al Creador"	5:23
5.	"Cupido"	4:30
6.	"El Sediento"	4:33
7.	"Suplica"	4:27
8.	"Un Sí o Un No"	4:40

== Critical reception ==
Professional ratings
Review scores
Source	Rating
AllMusic	4/5 stars

José A. Estévez Jr. of AllMusic gave the album a positive review and noted the change of style within the group with the influence of the salsa romantica era. Romántico y Sabroso was nominated for a Lo Nuestro Award for Tropical Album of the Year in 1989.

== Charts ==
Chart (1988)	Peak position
US Billboard Tropical Albums	1
