= Salsa romántica =

Soft form of salsa music

Salsa romántica (Spanish for Romantic Salsa, pronounced [ˈsalsa roˈmantika]) is a soft form of salsa music that emerged between the mid-1980s and early 1990s in New York City, Puerto Rico, and the Dominican Republic. It has been criticised for it being supposedly a pale imitation of "real" salsa, often called "salsa dura".

== Description and origins ==
The genre was introduced by La Palabra, a Cuban musician, in the mid-1980s. It arose at a time when classic salsa, popularized by Fania Records, was growing on the Latin record charts, including the rise of Latin pop. Salsa romántica was an adaptation of melodic love songs to a smooth, light salsa backing. The style sprang from a single album, Noches Calientes, created in 1984 by Fania producer Luis Ramirez.

Young salseros such as Lalo Rodriguez and the Puerto Rican Eddie Santiago were creating salsa with frothy songs and suggestive lyrics. Salsa romántica uses softer, quieter orchestral sounds, ballads set to a slowed-down salsa rhythm and romantic lyrics. Due to the softer orchestration and leisurely rhythm, some have nicknamed this genre "limp salsa".

== Criticism ==
Salsa romántica was heavily influenced by the balada style (or pop style) of salsa and is widely criticized due to the simple compositional style of both types. Salsa romántica has been considered to be an imitation of classic salsa. In Cuba, some critics refer to salsa romántica as the "white" style to differentiate it from traditional salsa. Critics have also stated that "true salsa" involved intricate composition. Critics of salsa romántica, especially in the late 1980s and early 1990s, called it a "commercialized, watered-down" form of Latin pop, in which formulaic, sentimental love ballads were simply put to an Afro-Cuban beat.

== Today ==
Jerry Rivera was the first salsero to go triple platinum with his record Cuenta Conmigo (Count on Me), which was all salsa romántica. La India, Luis Enrique, Giro Lopez, Marc Anthony, and Víctor Manuelle are some of the best-known performers of salsa romántica. Marc Anthony has been the highest-selling salsa artist of the past two decades. Another salsa artist, Omar Alfano, was handheld into a business by salsa dura songwriter Johnny Ortiz.
