= Eddie Santiago =

Puerto Rican salsa singer (born 1955)

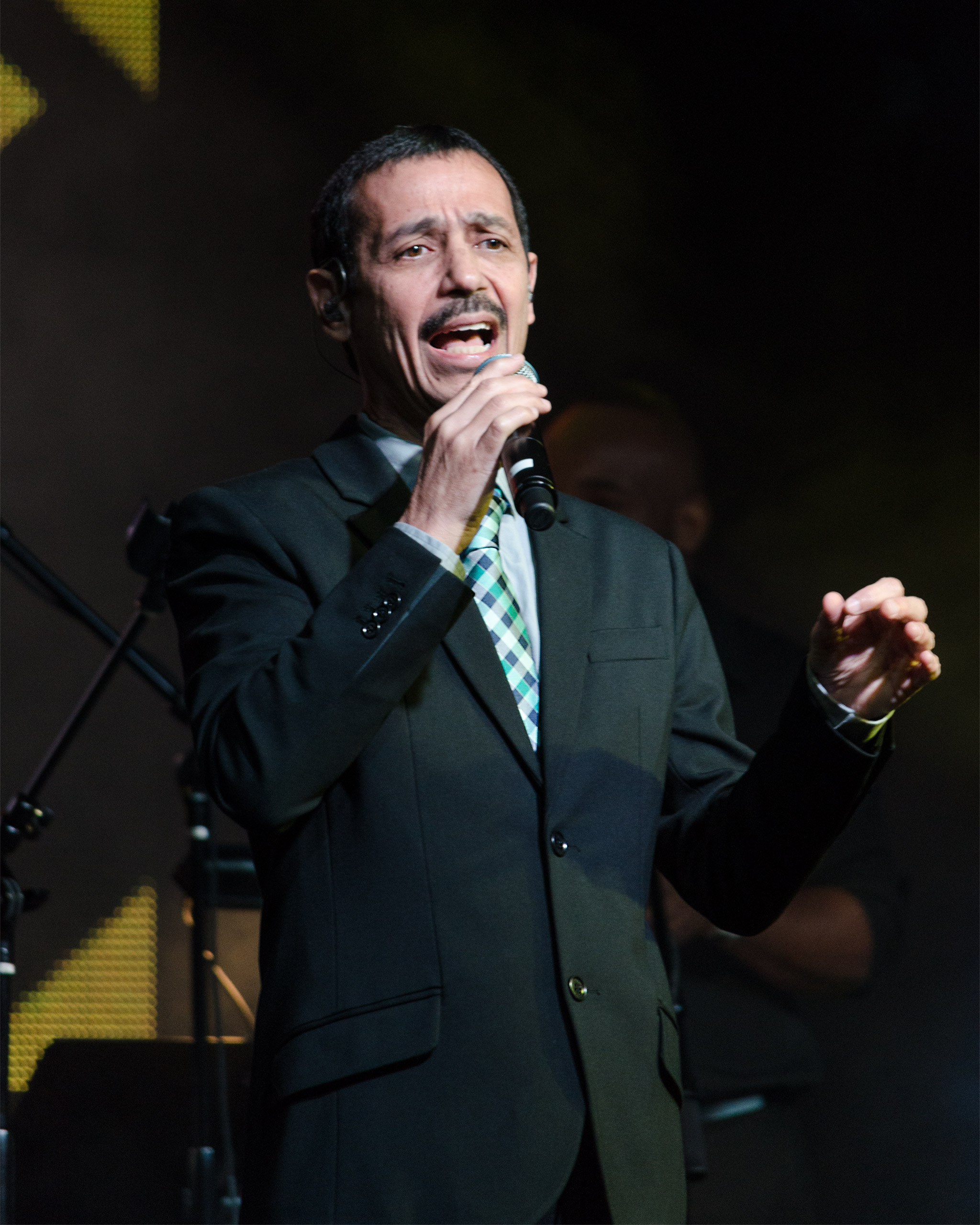
- Eddie Santiago in 2014

Background information
- Born: Eduardo Santiago Rodríguez; August 18, 1955 (age 71); Toa Alta, Puerto Rico
- Genres: Salsa
- Instrument: Vocals
- Years active: 1984–present
- Labels: Rodven Records, PolyGram, MP
- Website: http://www.myspace.com/eddiesantiagomusic

Eddie Santiago (born Eduardo Santiago Rodríguez, August 18, 1955) is a salsa singer from Puerto Rico. He is one of the great figures of this musical genre, with popular songs such as "Tú Me Quemas" on Atrevido y Diferente, "Lluvia" on Sigo Atrevido and "Tù Me Haces Falta" and "Mía" on Invasión de la Privacidad.

== Early years ==
At a young age, Santiago demonstrated great love for salsa music. He performed with several groups, including Generación 2000, Orquesta La Potente, Orquesta Opus, and the Orquesta Saragüey.

== Musical career ==
Santiago's career took off in 1986 in Puerto Rico and the rest of Latin America as a soloist, forming his own band, and recording songs including "Tú Me Quemas" ("You Burn Me"), "Qué Locura Enamorarme de Ti" ("What Madness to Fall in Love with You"), "Me Fallaste" ("You Failed Me"), "Antidoto y Veneno" ("Antidote and Venom"), "Tu Me Haces Falta" ("I Miss You"), his best known hit "Lluvia" ("Rain", not to be confused with Menudo's hit of the same name), and many others. His fame eventually spread to Europe and the United States, making him one of the most popular salsa singers in the late 1980s and early 1990s. He was one of the main singers of "salsa romántica" ("romantic salsa").

His first major recording on an international label was with Sony Music in 1999. He also recorded for the TH, EMI Latin, and Polygram labels, including the well-regarded production inspired by the music of Rafael Hernández, entitled Enamorado.

In 1999, he released Celebration: Epic Duets. He was joined on that album by other stars in the Latin music scene, including Víctor Manuelle, Huey Dunbar and Elvis Crespo. The album was named one of the best recordings of 1999 by the National Foundation for Popular Culture.

Santiago has earned both gold and platinum records, along with other awards.

== 2004–present ==
In 2004, Eddie Santiago announced a return to commercial music, with his new CD, Despues del Silencio (After the Silence), a title that alludes to the long period since his previous CD was released.

He was nominated for the Salsa/Merengue Album of the Year in the 2006 Grammy Awards.

His song "Black is Black" was included on the Nacho Libre movie soundtrack.

== Discography ==
- 1986 - Atrevido y Diferente
- 1987 - Sigo Atrevido
- 1988 - Invasión de la Privacidad
- 1989 - New Wave Salsa
- 1990 - El Rey de la Salsa Romántica
- 1991 - Soy el Mismo
- 1993 - Intensamente
- 1993 - Cada Vez, Otra Vez
- 1995 - Eddie Santiago
- 1996 - De Vuelta a Casa
- 1997 - Enamorado
- 1999 - Celebracion: Epic Duets
- 2001 - Ahora
- 2004 - Interpreta los Grandes Éxitos de Luis Ángel
- 2004 - Después del Silencio
- 2006 - En Su Estilo... Romántico y Sensual

== Charts ==
=== Albums ===
List of albums, with selected chart positions, sales figures, and certifications
Title	Album details	Peak chart positions	
Title	Album details	US Latin Albums	US Tropical
Atrevido y Diferente	Released: 1986; Label: Rodven Records	—	1
Sigo Atrevido	Released: 1987; Label: Rodven Records	—	1
Atrevido	Released: 1988; Label: Rodven Records	—	1
Invasión de la Privacidad	Released: 1988; Label: Rodven Records	—	1
New Wave Salsa	Released: 1989; Label: Rodven Records	—	1
El Rey de la Salsa Romántica	Released: 1990; Label: Rodven Records	—	1
Soy el Mismo	Released: 1991; Label: Capitol/EMI Records	—	1
Intensamente	Released: 1993; Label: Rodven Records	—	5
Cada Vez, Otra Vez	Released: 1994; Label: Capitol/EMI Records	49	10
Eddie Santiago	Released: 1995; Label: Capitol/EMI Records	—	—
Celebración: Epic Duets	Released: 1999; Label: Sony Discos	8	3
Pura Salsa	Released: 2006; Label: Universal	—	13

=== Singles ===
List of singles, with selected chart positions and certifications, showing year released and album name
Title	Year	Peak chart positions		Album
Title	Year	US Latin Songs	US Latin Tropical	Album
"Tú Me Quemas"	1986	10	—	Atrevido y Diferente
"Que Locura Enamorame de Ti"	1987	13	—	Atrevido y Diferente
"Nadie Mejor Que Tú"	1987	16	—	Atrevido y Diferente
"Lluvia"	1988	4	—	Sigo Atrevido
"Todo Empezó"	1988	19	—	Sigo Atrevido
"Hagámoslo"	1988	31	—	Sigo Atrevido
"Insaciable"	1988	34	—	Sigo Atrevido
"Tú Me Haces Falta"	1989	9	—	Invasión de la Privacidad
"Antídoto y Veneno"	1989	18	—	Invasión de la Privacidad
"Me Fallaste"	1989	16	—	Invasión de la Privacidad
"Mía"	1989	19	—	Invasión de la Privacidad
"Me Hiciste Caer"	1990	13	—	New Wave Salsa
"Me Faltas Tú"	1991	9	—	Soy el Mismo
"Hasta Aquí Te Fui Fiel"	1992	8	—	Soy el Mismo
"Deseos"	1992	35	—	Soy el Mismo
"Vivo Para Ti"	1993	9	—	Intensamente
Cada Vez Otra Vez	1993			
Cada Vez Otra Vez	"Jamás"	22	—	
"El Triste"	1994	28	—	
"Me Vuelve Loco Tu Amor"	1996	—	16	De Vuelta a Casa
"Que Locura Enamorame de Ti" (featuring Huey Dunbar)	1999	—	5	Celebración: Epic Duets
"Celebración" (featuring Huey Dunbar, Elvis Crespo, Robbie Salinas, and Son By Four)	2000	—	33	Celebración: Epic Duets
"Anoche Valió la Pena"	2001	—	13	Ahora
"Loco Por Tu Amor"	2004	—	14	Después del Silencio
"No He Podido Olvidarla"	2006	—	18	En Su Estilo Romántico y Sensual

== See also ==
- List of Puerto Ricans
