= Tommy Olivencia =

Puerto Rican musician (1938–2006)

- Born: Ángel Tomás Olivencia Pagán; May 15, 1938; Santurce, San Juan, Puerto Rico
- Died: September 22, 2006 (aged 68) San Juan, Puerto Rico
- Genre: Salsa
- Years active: 1960–2006
- Label: Top Hits

Tommy Olivencia (May 15, 1938 – September 22, 2006) was a renowned Puerto Rican bandleader of salsa music.

== Early years ==
Olivencia (birth name: Ángel Tomás Olivencia Pagán) was born in the Villa Palmeras section of Santurce, San Juan, Puerto Rico. His family moved to the city of Arecibo when he was just a child. There received his primary and secondary education. As a young man, he became fascinated with the trumpet and learned to play the musical instrument. In 1954, Olivencia sang and played the trumpet for local bands. He graduated from high school in 1957 and his family relocated once again to Santurce.

== La Primerísima Orquesta de Puerto Rico ==
In 1960, Olivencia organized his first orchestra, which he named the "Tommy Olivencia y La Primerísima Orquesta de Puerto Rico". His band combined swing and melodic styles together. This combination, plus a strong brass contingent in the band was his trademark. Olivencia signed a contract with Inca Records and remained with that label until 1978. In 1972, he had his first major "hit" with Secuestro (Kidnapped) and followed that with Juntos de Nuevo (Together Again) in 1974 and Planté Bandera in 1975.

Olivencia's band was also known as the "Tommy Olivencia School", because the band produced some of the best and most talented singers and musicians of salsa in the island. Among those to have belonged to the band at one time or another were: Chamaco Ramirez, Sammy "El Rolo" González, Simon Perez, Paquito Guzman, Ubaldo "Lalo" Rodriguez, Gilberto Santa Rosa, Marvin Santiago, Frankie Ruiz, Hector Tricoche, Carlos Alexis, Hector "Pichie" Perez, Paquito "Junior" Acosta and Mel Martínez.

== Discography ==
Among the albums recorded by Olivencia and his band are:

- Trucutu (1965)
- La Nueva Sensación Musical de Puerto Rico (1965) [Repackaging of Trucutu]
- Jala-Jala y Guaguancó (1966)
- Fire-Fire (1967)
- A Toda Máquina..! (1968)
- Cuero...Salsa y Sentimiento (1971)
- Secuestro (1972)
- Juntos de Nuevo (1974)
- Planté Bandera (1975)
- Introducing Lalo Rodríguez and Simón Pérez (1976)
- El Negro Chombo (1977)
- La Primerísima (1978)
- Sweet Trumpet Hot "Salsa" (1978)
- Tommy Olivencia & Orchestra (1979)
- Un Triángulo de Triunfo (1981)
- Cantan: Frankie Ruiz y Carlos Alexis (1983)
- Celebrando Otro Aniversario (1985)
- Ayer, Hoy, Mañana y Siempre (1986)
- 30° Aniversario (1987)
- El Jeque (1989)
- Enamorado y Qué! (1991)
- Vive la Leyenda (1998)
- 40° Aniversario Live (2002)

The following are considered among the top 100 greatest salsa songs:

- "Casimira"
- "Cómo lo Hacen"
- "Trucutu"
- "Pa' Lante Otra Vez"
- "Lobo Domesticado"
- "No Me Tires la Primera Piedra"

== Awards and recognitions ==
Among the many awards and recognitions which have been bestowed upon Olivencia are the following:

- The Puerto Rican Senate passed a resolution congratulating Olivencia and his band for their contributions to Puerto Rico's music.
- El Cordero de Oro (The Golden Lamb) and El Buho de Oro (The Golden Owl) Awards from Panama, for the best foreign band.
- The Agüeybaná de Oro Award from Puerto Rico
- The November 11 Award from Colombia

== Later years and death ==
In August 2000, Olivencia celebrated his 40th anniversary in the music industry at the Tito Puente Theater in San Juan, an event attended by many of the former members of his band. On May 15, 2004, Olivencia celebrated his 66th birthday and 45 years with the band with a live recording concert. The National Salsa Day of 2005, celebrated annually in Puerto Rico was dedicated to Mr. Tommy Olivencia.

He died on September 22, 2006 at the age of 68, in San Juan, Puerto Rico from complications of diabetes, which he had battled his entire life. Olivencia is buried in the San José Cemetery in Villa Palmeras.

== See also ==
- List of Puerto Ricans
