= Rodven Records =

Venezuelan record company

- Parent company: Universal Music Group (1999–present); PolyGram (1995–1999)
- Founded: 1995
- Defunct: 1999
- Genre: Latin music
- Country of origin: Venezuela, United States

Rodven Records was a Venezuelan record label that belonged to the Cisneros family owned ODC Group, then proprietors of one of the largest TV networks in the country, Venevision. They also owned a nationwide AM radio network (RadioVision, which later expanded into the FM realm as FM Center) and a record stores chain (DiscoCenter), thus serving as a channel for those artists who belonged to the roster of either of those companies (mostly signed to Venevision).

== Early years ==
In its beginnings, SonoRodven (As it was originally named) emerged as a local source for international compilation albums (mostly those produced in the U.S. by companies such as K-Tel). Then it started handling a small roster of local luminaries, some of them also performing as actors for its sister TV network, such as Guillermo Dávila, Karina, Ricardo Montaner, Jose Luis Rodriguez "El Puma", Marcelo, and others. Then the roster began to grow up, and it became the second biggest local record label in Venezuela, alongside Sonográfica, its biggest competitor, from the rival group "Empresas 1BC" (proprietors of rival TV network RCTV, rival radio network RCR, rival record stores chain "Recordland"). Later, in the early-middle eighties, it became the Rodven Group, also comprising Video-Rodven, a commercial home video company, as well as other small record labels that previously existed in the country, such as Velvet (thus becoming VelvetRodven and later TH-Rodven, an outlet for all Latin dance music oriented artists, and later for other youth and pop acts, such as the late 80s boyband "Los Chamos", from which emerged the Venezuelan singer Carlos Baute), Love Records, and forming alliances with other record labels from around the world for local distribution purposes (thus forming EMI-Rodven, Hispavox-Rodven, Ariola-Rodven, Wea-Rodven et al.). This made Rodven's roster even bigger, allowing for the distribution of both local and foreign acts through a complete radio/TV/distribution platform, which later gave birth also to an artist management and show services company: "Big Show Productions".

== Later years ==
By 1994, the label was responsible for releasing about 10% of the Latin music market in the United States, and had its American headquarters in Miami. It was ultimately acquired by PolyGram in 1995 (which itself was later acquired by Universal Music Group in 1999). The record label was well known for popular Latin pop and salsa singers during the 1980s and 1990s. El Club de Los Tigritos alumni and teen idol Douglas Vale released his debut album Aun Soy Chamo only in Venezuela under Rodven and the breakthrough album Hieroglyphics associated with Maverick Records and Warner Music Group.

The Rodven catalog is currently owned by Universal Music Group through Universal Music Latin Entertainment with Machete Music managing the Tropical catalog and Universal Music Latino managing the non-Tropical catalogs.

== List of artists on Rodven Records and/or its associated labels ==
- Salsa Kids
- Banda Mitotera led by Brenda Mejia
- Eddie Santiago
- Frankie Ruiz
- Lalo Rodríguez
- Tommy Olivencia
- Oscar D'León (Venezuelan singer)
- Orquesta La Solución
- Edgar Joel
- Hector Tricoche
- Paquito Guzmán
- Andy Montañez
- Soledad Bravo (Venezuelan singer)
- Guillermo Dávila (Venezuelan singer/actor)
- Jorge Rigó (Chilean/Venezuelan singer)
- Karina (Venezuelan singer)
- Ricardo Arjona
- Ricardo Montaner (Venezuelan singer)
- Wilfrido Vargas
- Marvin Santiago
- Los Melódicos(Latin music Venezuelan band)
- Dimension Latina (Salsa Venezuelan band)
- Orquesta La Selecta (Latin music Puerto Rican band)
- Billo's Caracas Boys (Latin music Venezuelan band)
- Jose Luis Rodriguez "El Puma" (Venezuelan singer)
- Willie Rosario
- Willy Chirino
- Hansel y Raul
- Diveana (Venezuelan singer)
- Marcelo (Venezuelan singer)
- Mirla Castellanos (Venezuelan singer)
- Paul Gillman (Venezuelan rock singer)
- Roberto Antonio (Venezuelan singer)
- Miguel Moly (Venezuelan singer)
- Payasitas Nifu Nifa (Child Venezuelan band)
- Melissa (Venezuelan singer)
- Laura y Victor (Venezuelan boy singers)
- Jorge Aguilar (Venezuelan singer/producer)
- Guillermo Carrasco (Venezuelan singer/producer)
- Sentimiento Muerto (Venezuelan rock group)
- Los Chamos (Venezuelan Boyband)
- Douglas Vale
- Max Torres
- David Pabon
- Frank Quintero (Venezuelan singer/producer)
- Kiara (Venezuelan singer)
- Rudy LaScala (Venezuelan singer)
- Freddy López (Venezuelan folk singer)
- Daiquirí (Venezuelan tropical music band)
- René Romero (Venezuelan singer)
- Mirtha Pérez (Venezuelan singer)
- Antonietta (Venezuelan singer)
- Guaco (Venezuelan Latin/Gaita/typical dance band)
- Amilcar Boscan (Venezuelan singer)
- Aditus (Venezuelan rock band)
- Pablo Manavello (Venezuelan rock singer)
- Los Sysmos
- José Alberto Mugrabi (Argentinian/Venezuelan singer)
- Claudio Bermúdez Cassani (Mexican singer and Former member of the group Timbiriche)

== See also ==
- List of record labels
