= List of number-one Billboard Top Latin Songs from the 1980s =

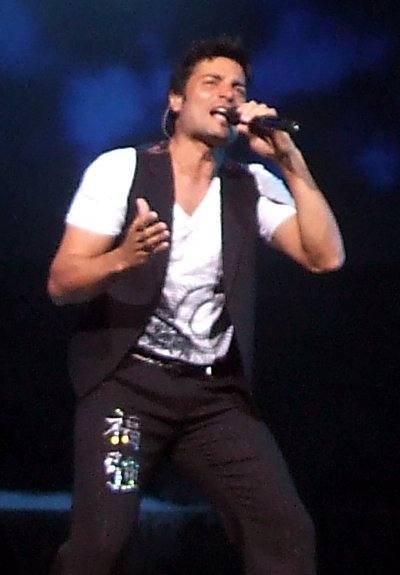
Puerto Rican singer Chayanne reached the top of the chart for the first time with "Fuiste un Trozo de Hielo en la Escarcha" in 1989.

The Hot Latin Songs chart (formerly Hot Latin 50 and Hot Latin Tracks), published in Billboard magazine, is a record chart based on Latin music airplay. The data were compiled by the Billboard chart and research department with information from 70 Spanish-language radio stations in the United States and Puerto Rico. Those radio stations were selected based on their number of listeners, and were asked to report their playlists for the week. This information was then entered to the Billboard computer system, and points were tabulated for each song. Before this chart's inception, the Latin music information on the magazine was presented only in the form of the biweekly album sales chart Top Latin Albums, which was divided into Latin Pop, Tropical/Salsa, and Region Mexican and continues to be listed separately.

During the 1980s, 33 songs topped the chart. According to the Billboard electronic database, the first was "La Guirnalda" by Spanish singer Rocío Dúrcal on September 6, 1986. However, in the listings included in the first printed publication of the chart on October 4, 1986, the first number-one song was "Yo No Sé Qué Me Pasó" by Mexican singer-songwriter Juan Gabriel. By the end of that year, another of Gabriel's compositions, "De Mí Enamórate", sung by Daniela Romo, also reached number one. Also in 1986, two Spanish versions of the Italian song "Tutta la vita", performed by Franco and Emmanuel succeeded one another at the top of the chart. Two songs recorded by Spanish singer Julio Iglesias peaked at number one, "Lo Mejor de Tu Vida" and "Que No Se Rompa la Noche". These songs were released from the album Un hombre solo, which received the Grammy Award for Best Latin Pop Performance.

In 1987, a biographical film about Ritchie Valens was released and American band Los Lobos were among the musicians chosen for the movie soundtrack, since the director chose to record new music for the film rather than use Valens' own recordings. They performed the title track "La Bamba", which became a worldwide success, topping the charts in the United States (including this chart and the Billboard Hot 100), Australia, France, New Zealand and Switzerland. The song "Qué Te Pasa" by Mexican singer Yuri spent 16 weeks at number one in 1988, becoming the longest-running chart topper of the 1980s, followed by fellow Mexican performer Ana Gabriel, who spent 14 weeks (in two separate runs) at the top with her single "Ay Amor".

Cuban singer-songwriter Gloria Estefan became the first artist to simultaneously peak at number one on the Billboard Hot 100 with "Don't Wanna Lose You", and the Billboard Top Latin Songs with the Spanish version titled "Si Voy a Perderte" on September 16, 1989. This single was her first release as a solo artist, independent of her role in the group Miami Sound Machine. Mexican singers Emmanuel, José José and Luis Miguel released the most number-one hits in the 1980s, with three each.

== Number-one songs ==
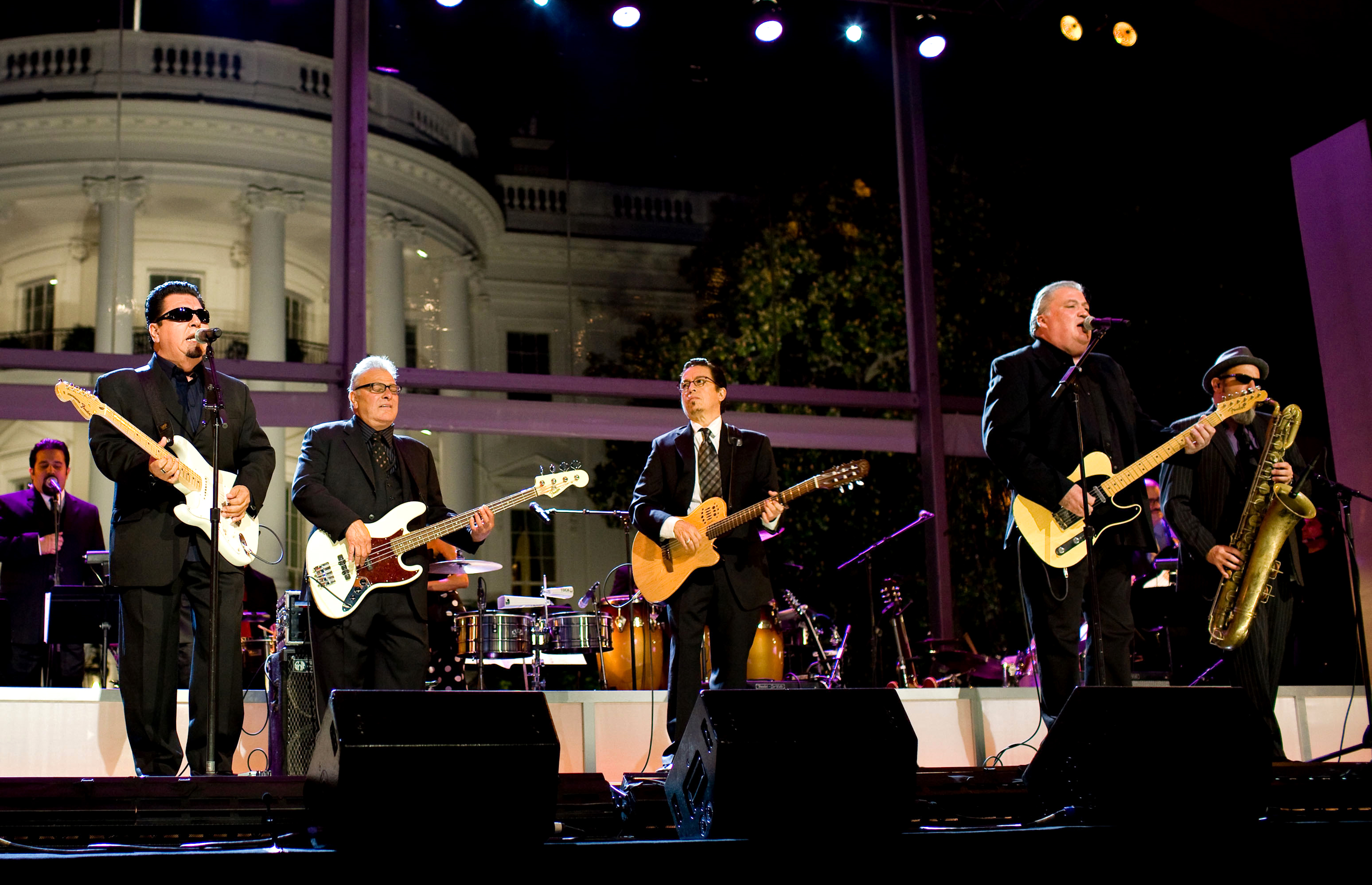
American band Los Lobos reached the top of the chart with their version of the song "La Bamba" in 1987.

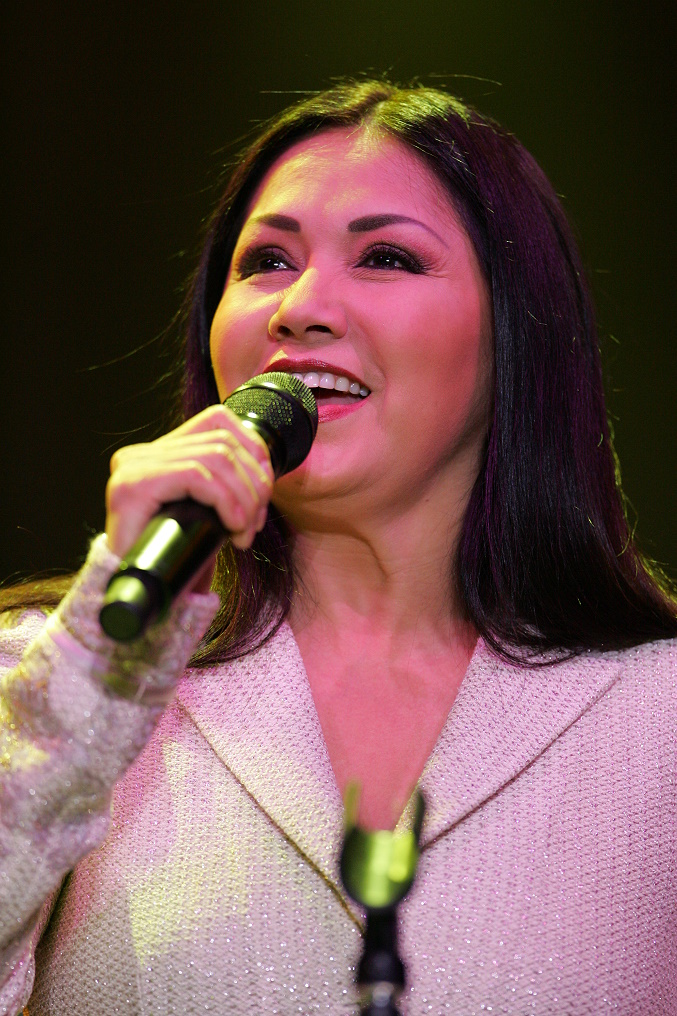
Mexican singer-songwriter Ana Gabriel spent 14 weeks at number-one with her song "Ay Amor".

Artist	Single	Reached number one	Weeks
Rocío Dúrcal	"La Guirnalda"	September 6, 1986	1
Juan Gabriel	"Yo No Sé Qué Me Pasó"	September 13, 1986	4
Franco	"Toda La Vida"	October 11, 1986	1
Emmanuel	"Toda La Vida"	October 18, 1986	1
Franco	"Toda La Vida"	October 25, 1986	1
Emmanuel	"Toda La Vida"	November 1, 1986	2
Franco	"Toda La Vida"	November 15, 1986	1
José José	"¿Y Quién Puede Ser?"	November 22, 1986	4
Daniela Romo	"De Mí Enamórate"	December 20, 1986	14
Emmanuel	"Es Mi Mujer"	March 28, 1987	4
Braulio	"En Bancarrota"	April 25, 1987	6
Julio Iglesias	"Lo Mejor de Tu Vida"	June 6, 1987	11
Luis Miguel	"Ahora Te Puedes Marchar"	August 22, 1987	1
Julio Iglesias	"Lo Mejor de Tu Vida"	August 29, 1987	2
Luis Miguel	"Ahora Te Puedes Marchar"	September 12, 1987	1
Los Lobos	"La Bamba"	September 19, 1987	7
Luis Miguel	"Ahora Te Puedes Marchar"	November 7, 1987	1
Julio Iglesias	"Que No Se Rompa la Noche"	November 14, 1987	2
José Luis Rodríguez	"Y Tú También Llorarás"	November 28, 1987	7
José José	"Soy Así"	January 16, 1988	1
Ana Gabriel	"Ay Amor"	January 23, 1988	12
Juan Gabriel	"Debo Hacerlo"	April 16, 1988	1
Los Bukis	"Y Ahora Te Vas"	April 23, 1988	1
Ana Gabriel	"Ay Amor"	April 30, 1988	2
Yuri	"Qué Te Pasa"	May 14, 1988	16
Franco	"María"	September 3, 1988	4
Marisela	"Ya No"	October 1, 1988	1
Franco	"María"	October 8, 1988	2
Angela Carrasco	"Boca Rosa"	October 22, 1988	4
Roberto Carlos	"Si El Amor Se Va"	November 19, 1988	3
Rocío Dúrcal	"Como Tu Mujer"	December 10, 1988	10
Yuri	"Hombres al Borde de un Ataque de Celos"	February 18, 1989	4
José José	"Como Tú"	March 18, 1989	10
Luis Miguel	"La Incondicional"	May 27, 1989	7
José Luis Rodríguez	"Baila Mi Rumba"	July 15, 1989	7
Ana Gabriel	"Simplemente Amigos"	September 2, 1989	2
Gloria Estefan	"Si Voy a Perderte"	September 16, 1989	5
Luis Miguel	"Fría Como el Viento"	October 21, 1989	2
Chayanne	"Fuiste un Trozo de Hielo en la Escarcha"	November 4, 1989	1
Luis Miguel	"Fría Como el Viento"	November 11, 1989	1
Chayanne	"Fuiste un Trozo de Hielo en la Escarcha"	November 18, 1989	3
Los Bukis	"Cómo Fuí a Enamorarme de Ti"	December 9, 1989	3
Emmanuel	"La Chica de Humo"	December 30, 1989	3

- Note: A single listed more than once in the list spent a non-consecutive run at number one.

== See also ==
- 1980s in Latin music
- Billboard Top Latin Albums

== Notes ==
General

- "Top Latin Songs database". Billboard. Nielsen Business Media, Inc. For information about every week of this chart, follow this link; in the chart date section select a date and the top ten positions for the week selected will appear on screen, including the number-one song, which is shown in the table above.

Specific
