= List of number-one hits of 1986 (Mexico) =

This is a list of the songs that reached number one in Mexico in 1986, according to the Notitas Musicales magazine with data provided by Radio Mil(which also provided charts for Billboard's "Hits of the World" between 1969 and 1981).

Notitas Musicales was a bi-weekly magazine that published two record charts:

- "Canciones que México canta" ("Songs that Mexico sings"), which listed the Top 10 most popular Spanish-language songs in Mexico, and
- "Hit Parade", which was a Top 10 of the most popular songs in Mexico that were in languages other than Spanish.

== Chart history ==
Issue Date	Spanish-language songs		Songs in other languages		Ref.
Issue Date	Song	Artist(s)	Song	Artist(s)	Ref.
1 January	"Esta cobardía"	Chiquetete	"Live Is Life"	Opus	
15 January	"Esta cobardía"	Chiquetete	"Live Is Life"	Opus	
1 February	"Esta cobardía"	Chiquetete	"Live Is Life"	Opus	
15 February	"Yo te pido amor"	Yuri	"Live Is Life"	Opus	
1 March	"Amor imposible"	Lucía Méndez	"Live Is Life"	Opus	
15 March	"Bazar"	Flans	"Part-Time Lover"	Stevie Wonder	
1 April	"Bazar"	Flans	"Part-Time Lover"	Stevie Wonder	
15 April	"Cuando estemos juntos"	Tatiana & Johnny	"Part-Time Lover"	Stevie Wonder	
1 May	"Cuando estemos juntos"	Tatiana & Johnny	"Part-Time Lover"	Stevie Wonder	
15 May	"Bazar"	Flans	"Part-Time Lover"	Stevie Wonder	
1 June	"No controles"	Flans	"Part-Time Lover"	Stevie Wonder	
15 June	"No controles"	Flans	"Wake Up"	Stop	
1 July	"No controles"	Flans	"Say You, Say Me"	Lionel Richie	
15 July	"No controles"	Flans	"Wake Up"	Stop	
1 August	"No controles"	Flans	"Rock Me Amadeus"	Falco	
15 August	"No controles"	Flans	"Rock Me Amadeus"	Falco	
1 September	"No controles"	Flans	"Rock Me Amadeus"	Falco	
15 September	"Toda la vida"	Franco / Emmanuel	"Rock Me Amadeus"	Falco	
1 October	"Toda la vida"	Franco / Emmanuel	"p:Machinery"	Propaganda	
15 October	"Toda la vida"	Franco / Emmanuel	"Rock Me Amadeus"	Falco	
1 November	"Toda la vida"	Franco / Emmanuel	"Rock Me Amadeus"	Falco	
15 November	"Toda la vida"	Franco / Emmanuel	"Dancing on the Ceiling"	Lionel Richie	
1 December	"Toda la vida"	Franco / Emmanuel	"Dancing on the Ceiling"	Lionel Richie	
15 December	"Toda la vida"	Franco	"All the Love"	The Outfield	

== See also ==
- 1986 in music

== Sources ==
- Print editions of the Notitas Musicales magazine.
