= List of number-one hits of 1990 (Mexico) =

This is a list of the songs that reached number one in Mexico in 1990, according to the Notitas Musicales magazine with data provided by Radio Mil(which also provided charts for Billboard's "Hits of the World" between 1969 and 1981).

Notitas Musicales was a bi-weekly magazine that published two record charts:

- "Canciones que México canta" ("Songs that Mexico sings"), which listed the Top 10 most popular Spanish-language songs in Mexico, and
- "Hit Parade", which was a Top 10 of the most popular songs in Mexico that were in languages other than Spanish. For reasons unknown, the magazine stopped publishing the "Hit Parade" chart in 1988 and wouldn't feature it again until 1993.

== Chart history ==
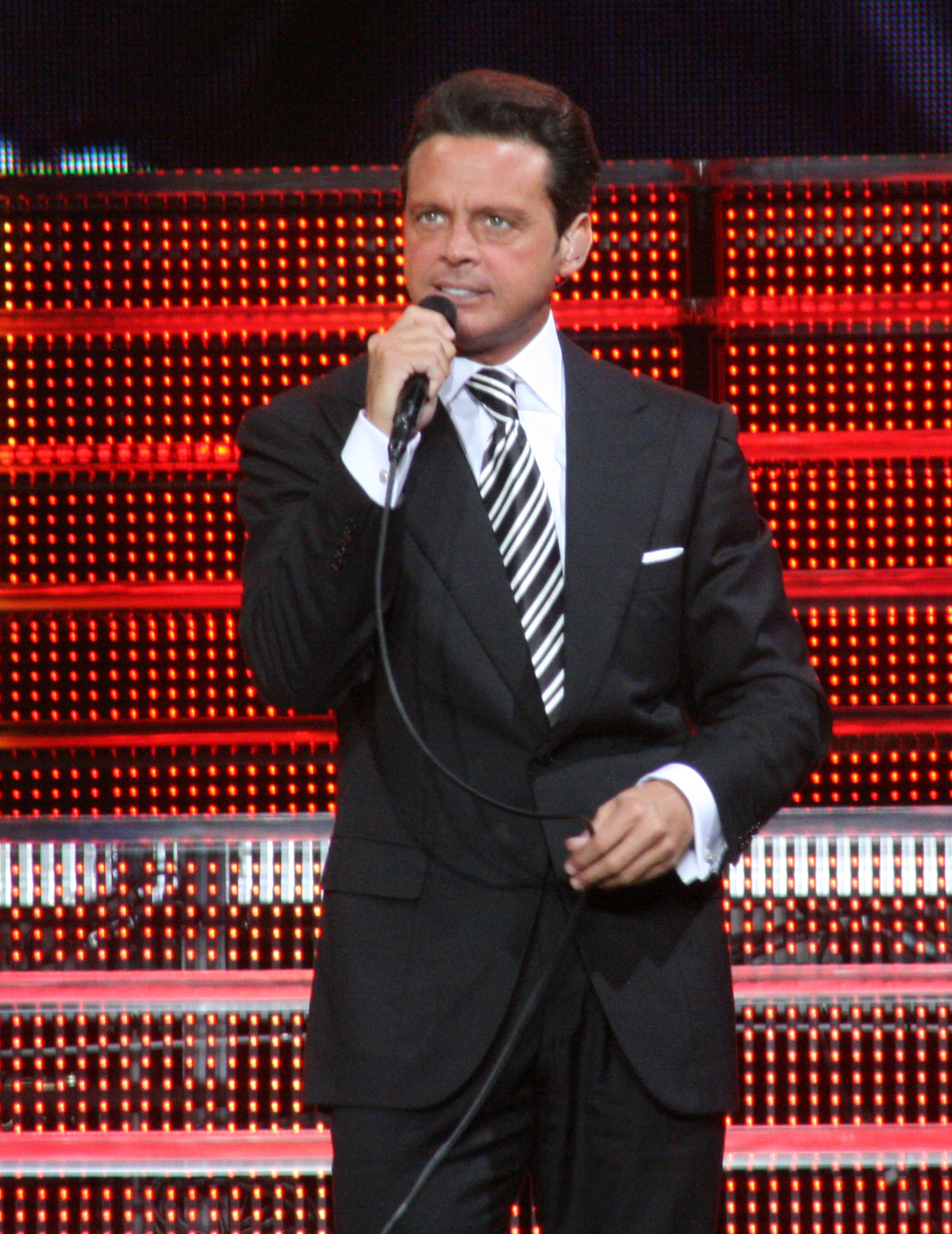
Mexican singer Luis Miguel (pictured) had two number-one songs throughout the year.

Issue Date	"Songs that Mexico sings" (Spanish)		Ref.
Issue Date	Song	Artist(s)	Ref.
1 January	"Louis"	Franco de Vita	
15 January	"Louis"	Franco de Vita	
1 February	"La chica de humo"	Emmanuel	
15 February	"La chica de humo"	Emmanuel	
1 March	"La chica de humo"	Emmanuel	
15 March	"La chica de humo"	Emmanuel	
1 April	"Culpable o no"	Luis Miguel	
15 April	"Para amarnos más"	Mijares	
1 May	"Para amarnos más"	Mijares	
15 May	"Cuando llega el amor"	Lucero	
1 June	"Cuando llega el amor"	Lucero	
15 June	"Cuando llega el amor"	Lucero	
1 July	"Tengo todo excepto a ti"	Luis Miguel	
15 July	"Tengo todo excepto a ti"	Luis Miguel	
1 August	"Tengo todo excepto a ti"	Luis Miguel	
15 August	"Tengo todo excepto a ti"	Luis Miguel	
1 September	"Tengo todo excepto a ti"	Luis Miguel	
15 September	"Tengo todo excepto a ti"	Luis Miguel	
1 October	"Tengo todo excepto a ti"	Luis Miguel	
15 October	"Tengo todo excepto a ti"	Luis Miguel	
1 November	"Cuidado con el corazón"	Alejandra Guzmán	
15 November	"Cuidado con el corazón"	Alejandra Guzmán	
1 December	"Cuidado con el corazón"	Alejandra Guzmán	
15 December	"Alcanzar una estrella"	Mariana Garza	

== See also ==
- 1990 in music

== Sources ==
- Print editions of the Notitas Musicales magazine.
