= List of number-one hits of 1985 (Mexico) =

This is a list of the songs that reached number one in Mexico in 1985, according to the Notitas Musicales magazine with data provided by Radio Mil(which also provided charts for Billboard's "Hits of the World" between 1969 and 1981).

Notitas Musicales was a bi-weekly magazine that published two record charts:

- "Canciones que México canta" ("Songs that Mexico sings"), which listed the Top 10 most popular Spanish-language songs in Mexico, and
- "Hit Parade", which was a Top 10 of the most popular songs in Mexico that were in languages other than Spanish.

== Chart history ==
Issue Date	Spanish-language songs		Songs in other languages		Ref.
Issue Date	Song	Artist(s)	Song	Artist(s)	Ref.
1 January	"Querida"	Juan Gabriel	"I Just Called To Say I Love You"	Stevie Wonder	
15 January	"Palabra de honor"	Luis Miguel	"Ghostbusters"	Ray Parker Jr.	
1 February	"Palabra de honor"	Luis Miguel	"Ghostbusters"	Ray Parker Jr.	
15 February	"Querida"	Juan Gabriel	"Ghostbusters"	Ray Parker Jr.	
1 March	"Palabra de honor"	Luis Miguel	"Ghostbusters"	Ray Parker Jr.	
15 March	"Palabra de honor"	Luis Miguel	"Ghostbusters"	Ray Parker Jr.	
1 April	"Corazón de piedra"	Lucía Méndez	"Ghostbusters"	Ray Parker Jr.	
15 April	"Corazón de piedra"	Lucía Méndez	"Ghostbusters"	Ray Parker Jr.	
1 May	"Corazón de piedra"	Lucía Méndez	"Ghostbusters"	Ray Parker Jr.	
15 May	"Corazón de piedra"	Lucía Méndez	"Ghostbusters"	Ray Parker Jr.	
1 June	"Corazón de piedra"	Lucía Méndez	"We Are the World"	USA for Africa	
15 June	"Corazón de piedra"	Lucía Méndez	"We Are the World"	USA for Africa	
1 July	"Corazón de piedra"	Lucía Méndez	"We Are the World"	USA for Africa	
15 July	"Corazón de piedra"	Lucía Méndez	"We Are the World"	USA for Africa	
1 August	"Corazón de piedra"	Lucía Méndez	"We Are the World"	USA for Africa	
15 August	"Corazón de piedra"	Lucía Méndez	"We Are the World"	USA for Africa	
1 September	"Déjame vivir"	Juan Gabriel & Rocío Dúrcal	"We Are the World"	USA for Africa	
15 September	"Déjame vivir"	Juan Gabriel & Rocío Dúrcal	"We Are the World"	USA for Africa	
1 October	"Déjame vivir"	Juan Gabriel & Rocío Dúrcal	"We Are the World"	USA for Africa	
15 October	"Déjame vivir"	Juan Gabriel & Rocío Dúrcal	"We Are the World"	USA for Africa	
1 November	"Déjame vivir"	Juan Gabriel & Rocío Dúrcal	"We Are the World"	USA for Africa	
15 November	"Esta cobardía"	Chiquetete	"Careless Whisper"	Wham!	
1 December	"Esta cobardía"	Chiquetete	"Material Girl"	Madonna	
15 December	"Esta cobardía"	Chiquetete	"Material Girl"	Madonna	

== See also ==
- 1985 in music

== Sources ==
- Print editions of the Notitas Musicales magazine.
