= Boca Rosa =

Single by Ángela Carrasco

from the album Boca Rosa
- Released: 1988
- Recorded: 1987–1988
- Genre: Latin pop · Latin ballad
- Length: 3:17
- Label: EMI Capitol Latin
- Songwriter: Luis Carlos Esteban
- Producer: J.R. Florez

Ángela Carrasco singles chronology
"Si Tú Eres Mi Hombre y yo Tu Mujer" (1986)	"Boca Rosa" (1988)	"No Quiero Nada de Tí" (1989)

"Boca Rosa" (English: Pink Lips) is a song and title track written by Luis Carlos Esteban, produced by J.R. Florez and performed by Dominican singer Ángela Carrasco. It was released as the first single from the studio album Boca Rosa (1988). The song became Carrasco's first number-one single on the Billboard Hot Latin Tracks chart and also was nominated for a Lo Nuestro Award for Pop Song of the Year at the 1st Lo Nuestro Awards.

"Boca Rosa" debuted in the chart at number 49 on September 3, 1988 and climbed to the top ten four weeks later. It reached the top position of the survey on October 22, 1988, replacing "María" by Cuban singer Franco and being replaced four weeks later by Roberto Carlos' "Si El Amor Se Va". "Boca Rosa" ranked at number 21 in the Hot Latin Tracks year-end chart of 1988. Chantelle and Millonarios also recorded their version of the song.

== See also ==
- List of number-one Billboard Top Latin Songs from the 1980s
