= Y Para Siempre =

Studio album by Los Bukis
- Released: July 1, 1989
- Recorded: Spring 1989
- Genre: Grupero
- Length: 38:30
- Label: Fonovisa
- Producer: Marco Antonio Solís

Los Bukis chronology
Si Me Recuerdas (1988)	Y Para Siempre (1989)	A Través de Tus Ojos (1991)

Professional ratings
Review scores
Source	Rating
Allmusic	3/5 stars

Y Para Siempre (Eng.: "And Forever") is the twelfth studio album released by Los Bukis on July 1, 1989. This release includes nine songs written by Marco Antonio Solís, who also produced the album. The three singles yielded from this album peaked within the Top 20 in the Billboard Hot Latin Tracks chart: "A Donde Vayas", "Me Dió Coraje", and the number-one song "Cómo Fuí a Enamorarme de Tí". Como Fui a Enamorarme de Ti was also the name of the movie starring Los Bukis.

Currently, this album is unavailable on streaming services in the United States.

== Track listing ==
All songs written and composed by Marco Antonio Solís except for Dime Que Si

No.	Title	Length
1.	"Motívate"	3:22
2.	"A Dónde Vayas"	3:30
3.	"Mi Pobre Corazón"	3:12
4.	"Ladrón de Buena Suerte"	3:33
5.	"Dime Que Si" (written by Eusebio Cortez)	3:52
6.	"Cómo Fuí a Enamorarme de Tí"	4:31
7.	"Guapa"	4:04
8.	"Vete, Alejate de Mí"	3:50
9.	"Déjale Oír tu Voz"	5:07
10.	"Me Dió Coraje"	3:08

== Personnel ==
- Marco Antonio Solís — arranger, producer, realization
- Los Bukis — arranger
- Sergio Garcia — engineer
- Pancho Gilardi — design, photography
- Adriana Rebold — Graphic design, art direction

== Chart performance ==
=== Album ===
Chart (1989)	Peak position
U.S. Billboard Latin Pop Albums	5

=== Singles ===
Year of release	Single	U.S. HLT
1989	"A Donde Vayas"	2
1989	"Cómo Fuí a Enamorarme de Tí"	1
1990	"Me Dió Coraje"	19
