= Simón Bonifacio Rodríguez y Rodríguez =

Spanish politician, teacher, judge and businessman

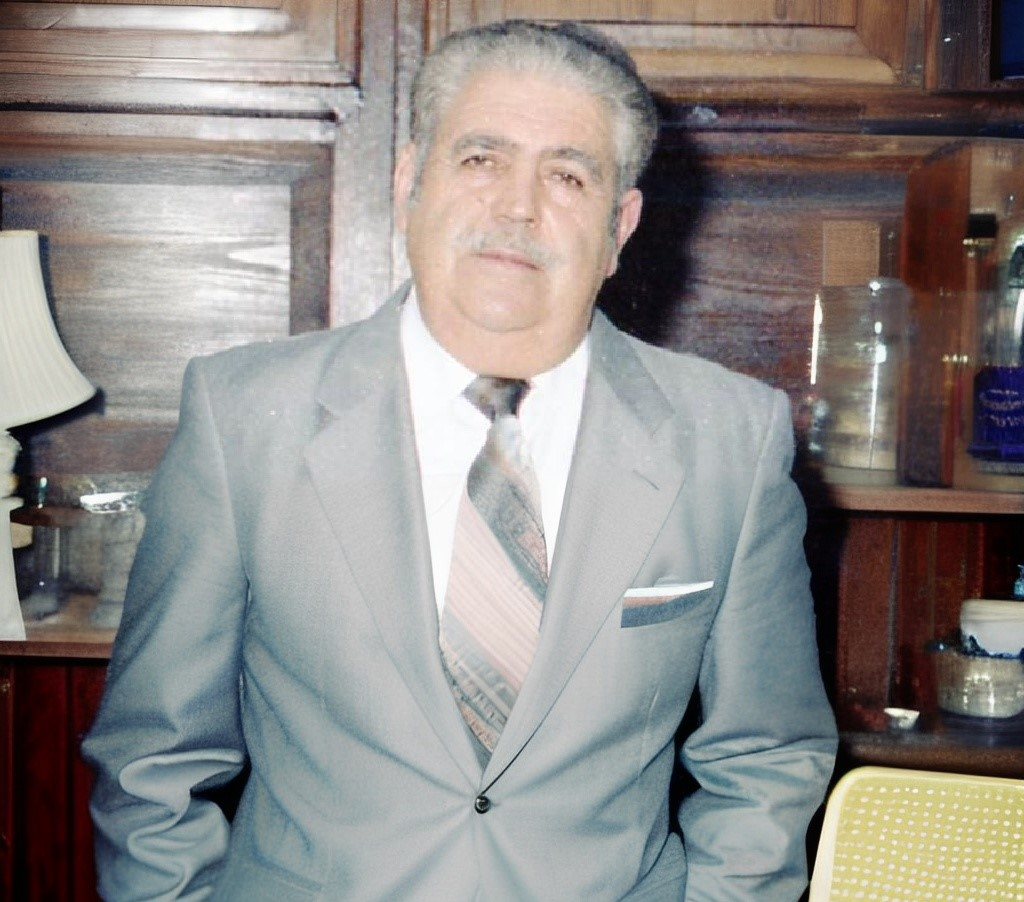
- Born: 21 April 1921; Spain Juncalillo, Gáldar
- Died: 17 July 2012 (aged 91); Las Palmas de Gran Canaria
- Occupations: teacher, businessman, judge and politician

Simón Bonifacio Rodríguez Rodríguez (15 April 1921 in Juncalillo, Gáldar – 17 August 2012 in Las Palmas de Gran Canaria) was a Spanish teacher, businessman, judge and politician.

== Biography ==
=== Youth ===
Simón Bonifacio Rodríguez y Rodríguez, son of Simón and Ángela Rodríguez, brother of the priests José, Francisco and Teodoro and of Flora. Married to Rosa Torrens Galván

Formed in the Youth Front, where he went through all the ranks of command: Local Chief, Youth Instructor, National Head of the Rural Home, etc. In this last position and in the seventh promotion he won the number one.

In 1934 he moved to Santa María de Guía de Gran Canaria, moving to the historic Casa Quintana, which was his residence until his death.

=== Professional life ===
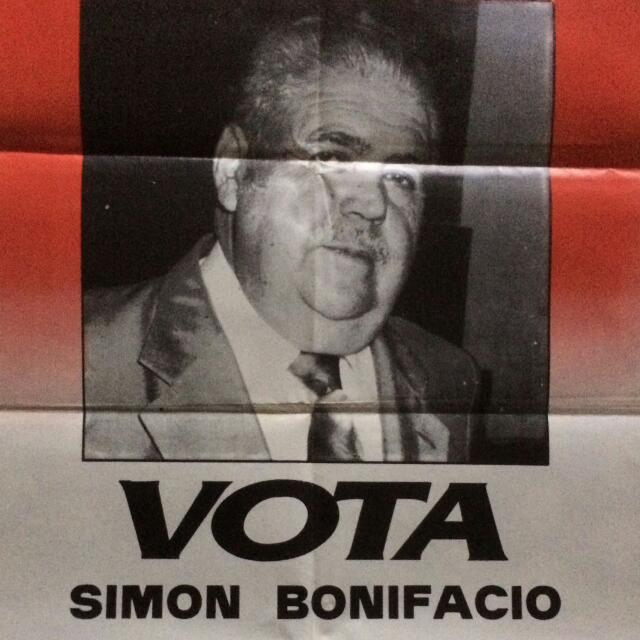
Head of cartel for AP

He worked as a professor at the Santa María College and later at the Santa María de Guía Institute, being also a regional delegate of the Spanish Magisterium Service (S.E.M.)

Entrepreneur of funerals, landowner in Juncalillo and San Isidro and representative of the insurance company La Finisterre. He held managerial positions in the Agricultural Union of the North of Gran Canaria. And in the journalistic aspect he was delegate of the newspaper El Eco de Canarías in the northern region.

In 1967 he was appointed Judge Substitute County by the Ministry of Justice position that he held for many years, for this reason in 1972 he was awarded the decoration of the Order of Saint Raymond of Peñafort.

He was also President of the Casino of Santa María de Guía de Gran Canaria. In addition, for a long time it was aguateniente, creating the brand Fuente Bruma S.L., whose aquifers and bottling plant were located in Juncalillo.

On 20 February 2012 he was named adopted son of the city of Guía de Gran Canaria.

=== Political life ===
He was councilor of Santa María de Guía during the years 1953 and 1963, where he held the council of celebrations. For a brief period he was mayor of the city. In the decade of the 80s of the last century also came to occupy the vice presidency of the Electoral Board of the area.

In 1983 he was head of the AP-PDP list, obtaining the act of councilor of the City Council of Guía.
