= La Chica de Humo =

Single by Emmanuel

from the album Quisiera
- Released: April 22, 1989
- Recorded: 1988
- Genre: Pop; New Jack Swing; Synth-pop; Latin R&B
- Length: 5:29
- Label: Sony
- Songwriters: Mauro Malavasi, María Lar
- Producers: Mauro Malavasi, K. C. Porter

Emmanuel singles chronology
"Quisiera" (1989)	"La Chica de Humo" (1989)	"La Vida Decidió" (1990)

"La chica de humo" ("The Smoke Girl") is a song by Mexican singer Emmanuel. It was written by Mauro Malavasi and María Lar, and produced by Mauro Malavasi and K. C. Porter for Emmanuel's eleventh studio album Quisiera in February 1989. Released as the second single from the album, the song became the third number-one single for the singer in the Billboard Top Latin Songs chart in late December of the same year. During live performances of the song, parts of "Gonna Make You Sweat (Everybody Dance Now)" by C+C Music Factory are integrated during the second bridge. This version can be found on the live album Retro En Vivo. It also has been also included on some compilation albums released by Emmanuel, including Personalidad (1992), Grandes Exitos (1996) and Mi Historia Musical (2005) Due to the success of the song, the album Quisiera peaked at number 9 in the Billboard Latin Pop Albums chart in 1990. It is recognized as one of Emmanuel's signature songs.

The song debuted on the Billboard Top Latin Songs chart (formerly Hot Latin Tracks) at number 15 on October 28, 1989 and climbed to the top ten two weeks later. It reached the top position of the chart on December 30, 1989, interrupting the run of the single "Cómo Fuí a Enamorarme de Tí" by Mexican band Los Bukis for two weeks. The song spent 20 weeks within the Top 40 and became the eighth top ten single for the singer in the chart, and third number-one hit, after "Toda La Vida" (1986) and "Es Mi Mujer" (1987). "La Chica de Humo" became the last number-one Latin single in the United States of the 1980s and remains the last time Emmanuel hit the top of this chart.

== Cover ==
Gianni Morandi recorded in 1992 a version in Italian called Ma tu chi sei ("But who are you?").

== See also ==
- List of number-one Billboard Top Latin Songs from the 1980s
