= Desnudo =

Studio album by Emmanuel
- Released: 1986
- Recorded: 1985–1986
- Studios: Sintonía Studios; Hispavox; Torresonido (Madrid, Spain); Livingston Studios (London, England, United Kingdom)
- Genre: Latin pop (80's)
- Length: 39:06
- Label: RCA Ariola
- Producer: Juan Carlos Calderón

Emmanuel chronology
Emmanuel (1984)	Desnudo (1986)	Entre Lunas (1988)

Desnudo (Naked) is the eighth studio album recorded by Mexican performer Emmanuel. It was released by RCA Ariola in 1986. The album was also released in the United States under the title Solo with different cover art, and this version was nominated for a Grammy Award for Best Latin Pop Performance.

The album included his cover of the Italian pop song, "Tutta la vita," retitled "Toda la vida." The song was Emmanuel's biggest hit of the 1980s, and still remains one of his most popular songs, as well as one of his personal favorites. When it went to #1, it had the distinction of nudging another Spanish version of the song by Cuban singer Franco out of the top spot. He also had a lesser hit with the song "No Te Quites la Ropa."

== Track listing ==
1. "Con Que Derecho"
2. "No Te Quites La Ropa"
3. "Mujer De Tantos Hombres"
4. "Luces De Bohemia Para Elisa"
5. "Toda La Vida"
6. "Es Mi Mujer"
7. "Enfrentarnos De Nuevo A La Vida"
8. "Rayo De Luna"
9. "Solo"
10. "Que Largo Fin De Semana"

== See also ==
- List of number-one Billboard Latin Pop Albums from the 1980s
