= En Bancarrota =

Single by Braulio

from the album Lo Bello y lo Prohibido
- Released: 1987
- Recorded: 1986
- Genre: Latin pop
- Length: 4:27
- Label: Discos CBS International
- Songwriter: Braulio
- Producer: Braulio · Ricardo Eddy Martínez

Braulio singles chronology
"Juguete de Nadie" (1986)	"En Bancarrota" (1987)	"Noche de Bodas" (1987)

"En Bancarrota" (English: In Bankruptcy) is a ballad written, performed and produced by Canarian singer-songwriter Braulio. The song was produced by himself and co-produced by Ricardo "Eddy" Martínez. It was released as the second single from his studio album Lo Bello y lo Prohibido (1986). This song became his first (and to date only) number-one hit at the Billboard Hot Latin Tracks chart and was later covered by Elvis Martínez, Raulin Rosendo and Floria Márquez.

In 1988, "En Bancarrota" was nominated for a Grammy Award for Best Latin Pop Performance, on the 30th Annual Grammy Awards. losing to Un hombre solo by Julio Iglesias.

== Chart performance ==
The song debuted on the Billboard Hot Latin Tracks chart at number 36 on 25 April 1987 and climbed to number-one twelve weeks later. It replace at the top of the chart "Es Mi Mujer" by Mexican performer Emmanuel and was replaced six weeks later by "Lo Mejor de Tu Vida" by Spanish performer Julio Iglesias.

=== Weekly charts ===
Chart (1987)	Peak position
US Billboard Hot Latin Tracks	1

=== All-time charts ===
Chart (2021)	Position
US Hot Latin Songs (Billboard)	36

== Credits and personnel ==
This information adopted from Allmusic.

- Richard Eddy Martínez – arranger, director, producer
- Braulio García – producer
- Eric Schilling – engineer, mixing
- Mike Cuzzi – engineer
- Ted Stein – engineer
- Mike Todd – assistant engineer

== See also ==
- List of number-one Billboard Top Latin Songs from the 1980s
