= Savage Love (disambiguation) =

Savage Love is a sex-advice column written by American author Dan Savage.

Savage Love may also refer to:

- Savage Love (book), a 1998 non-fiction book written by Dan Savage
- "Savage Love (Laxed – Siren Beat)", a 2020 song by Jawsh 685 and Jason Derulo
- "Savage Lover", a 1979 song by The Ring
- Savage/Love, a 2011 play by Sam Shepard and Joseph Chaikin
