= Boca Rosa (album) =

Studio album by Angela Carrasco
- Released: 1988
- Recorded: 1987–1988
- Genre: Pop Latin
- Label: EMI
- Producer: Gian Petro Felisatti

Angela Carrasco chronology
La Candela (1986)	Boca Rosa (1988)	Ese Hombre Es.. (1989)

Singles from Boca Rosa
- 1. "Boca Rosa" Released: 1988; 2. "Lo Quiero a Morir" Released: 1988; 3. "No Quiero Nada de Ti" Released: 1989

Professional ratings
Review scores
Source	Rating
Allmusic	4.5/5 stars

Boca Rosa (English: Red Mouth) is a studio album by Dominican singer Angela Carrasco released in 1988. The album became a success on the Latin Pop Albums charts and produced two singles, one of which reached number-one on Hot Latin Tracks.

== Track listing ==
1. Dama
2. Necesito Tu Olor
3. Ola de Calor
4. Lo Importante es Terminar
5. Boca Rosa
6. Lo Quiero a Morir
7. No Quiero Nada de Ti
8. Machos
9. La Ley de la Selva
10. Perfume de Aventura

== Chart performance ==
Chart (1988)	Peak position
US Billboard Latin Pop Albums	1

== See also ==
- List of Billboard Latin Pop Albums number ones from the 1980s
