= Casa Quintana =

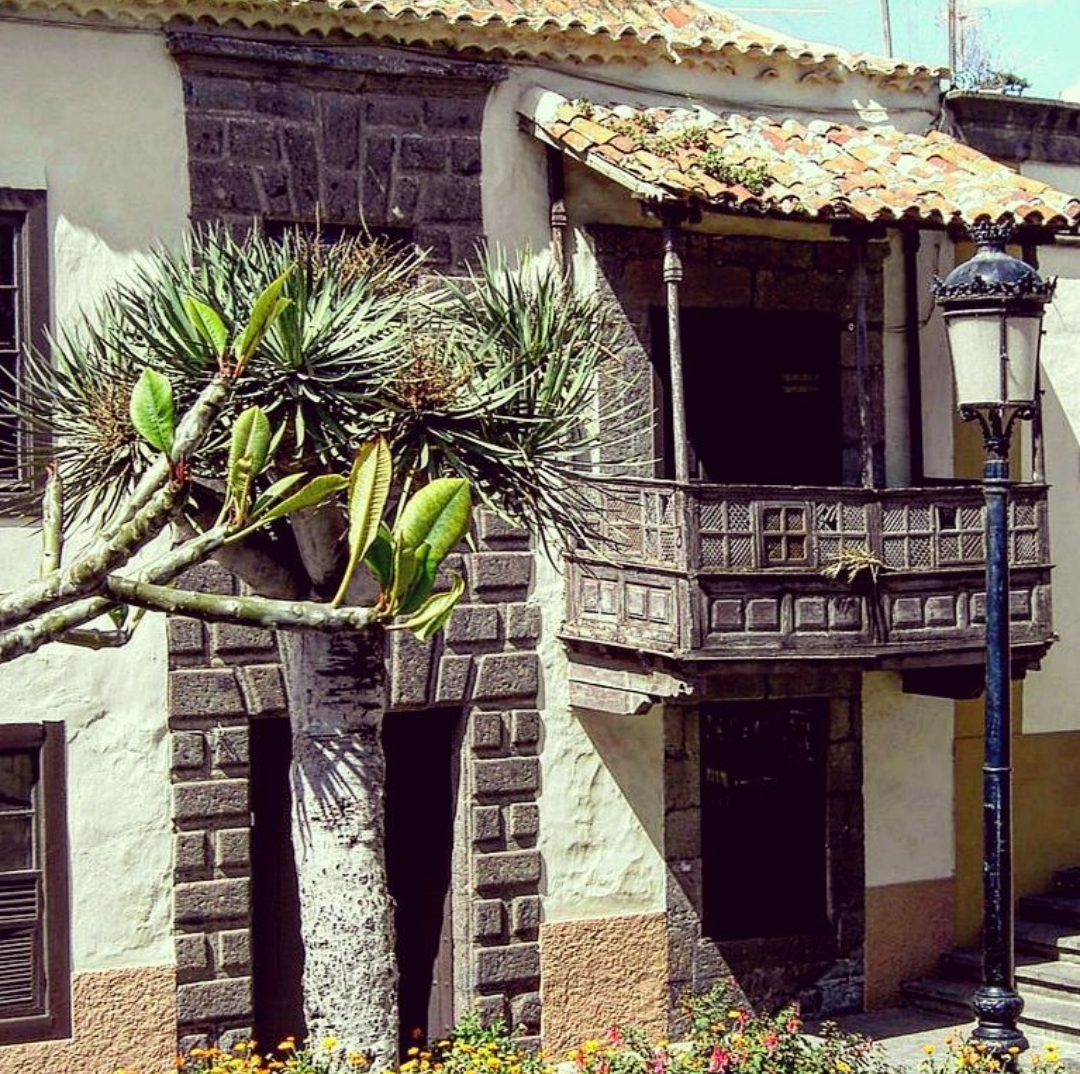
- Interactive map of the Casa Quintana area

General information
- Architectural style: Mudejar
- Location: Santa Maria de Guia de Gran Canaria, Canary Islands
- Coordinates: 28.139132376405072°N 15.633185505867003°W
- Construction started: 1533; 493 years ago
- Completed: 1533; 493 years ago

The Quintana House is an example of the architecture of the municipality of Guia de Gran Canaria in the Canarian island of Gran Canaria, located in the Plaza Mayor de Guía; its buildings date from the 16th century. The Canarian balcony is of Mudejar style, in wood and coat of arms with the surnames Guanarteme and Quintana.

== History ==
Guía de Gran Canaria was, until 1526, a population administratively dependent on Gáldar. Then it got the Mayor's Wand. To govern the new City Council, Governor Martín Fernández de Cerón granted Fernando Alonso de la Guardia the title of Royal Mayor. This first Guian mayor fixed his residence in the lower part of the town, facing the still-undeclared parish of Santa María de Guía, which would obtain such recognition in 1533 (the aforementioned area of the casco would be known as "Villa de Abajo", in opposition to the" Villa de Arriba" that would form in the surroundings of the hermitage of San Roque).

After several decades, at the beginning of the 17th century, the house had become the property of Gonzalo de Quintana and Betancourt, which is why it is known as Casa Quintana or De los Quintana.

Presumably, after the previous marriage, his son Juan Antonio de Acedo Bethencourt and Quintana Guanarteme inherited the house, born in Guía in 1695 and married in Las Palmas with Ana de Bethencourt Amoreto Westerling, and from his numerous offspring he went to the property of Luis Francisco de Acedo Bethencourt and Bethencourt who married María Magdalena Suárez de Aguilar Medina, marriage already cited in the history of the house of the Acedo.

In the 19th century Luis Francisco died in January 1817, after his wife had died in April 1805, her daughter María de los Dolores Acedo and Suarez inherited it, who died single in Las Palmas on June 17, 1887 at the age of 95 years, leaving testamentary dispositions before the notary José Benítez Llarena in which he designates as his heir of his property his nephew José Acedo Martinón as a lifetime usufruct and upon his death he should fall equally among his children called José, Agustín, Isidro and María del Pino Acedo Llarena.

But among its provisions there were express legacies such as the one that it makes regarding the house in the square in favor of Teresa Valdés y Acedo, widow of José Páez, establishing that upon her death they would fall in favor of the children of her other nephew Isidro Acedo Martinón. Consequently, in December 1887 María Teresa Valdés registered said usufruct in her name for which it was necessary to make a record because the house was not registered in the Registry.

Therefore, immediately after the death of María Acedo Suárez, her cousin José Acedo Martinón went to the Guide Court to testify the previous data of origin of the house to state that since despite having inherited it, it did not appear inscribed in his name in the corresponding mortgage registry that worked then in the town hall, and requests to fulfill this requirement, surely to be able to exercise its inherited right. The petition was admitted and required several witnesses, who were Pedro Bautista Hernández and Antonio Galván Pagán, to prove the veracity of the information they answered affirmatively. The file passed to prosecutor Ignacio Díaz Lorenzo, who approved it and Judge Francisco Lorenzo Montesdeoca issued a self-approval for what was registered in November 1887.

In November 1891, Teresa Valdés sells said usufruct to Antonio Medina Martín, who in December 1908 together with the lump property owned by José, Agustín, Isidro and María del Pino Acedo Llarena, were transferred to María del Carmen Martín Padrón, woman who was from Francisco González Santana. By testament of the said, dated July 26, 1923, before the notary Salvador García Pérez, he declares his sons Manuel, Santiago, Francisco, Alfredo, Aurelio and Asunción González Martín as heirs. In the partition of these goods, the house corresponded to Santiago González Martín, who registered it in his name in November 1928.

There are written references that at the end of the 18th century or the beginning of the 19th century they occupied the house, possibly rented, the Montesdeoca brothers, -Gaspar and Lorenzo, heals both, since the second was benefited from said church and later canon of the cathedral- who commissioned Luján Pérez the magnificent stature of the Virgen de las Mercedes. It is said that in the basement of the typical balcony of this house, theatrical performances were held every year on September 24, and in one of these it was where the archdeacon of Fuerteventura, José de Viera y Clavijo, discovered the skills of a child from whom He became a protector and would later be the priest of the Tabernacle, politician in the Cortes of Cádiz and canon of the Cathedral of Havana: Pedro José Gordillo Ramos.

It was the childhood home of Simón Bonifacio Rodríguez y Rodríguez and José Rodríguez y Rodríguez, in which the latter lived from 1934 until his death in 2012.

== Architecture ==
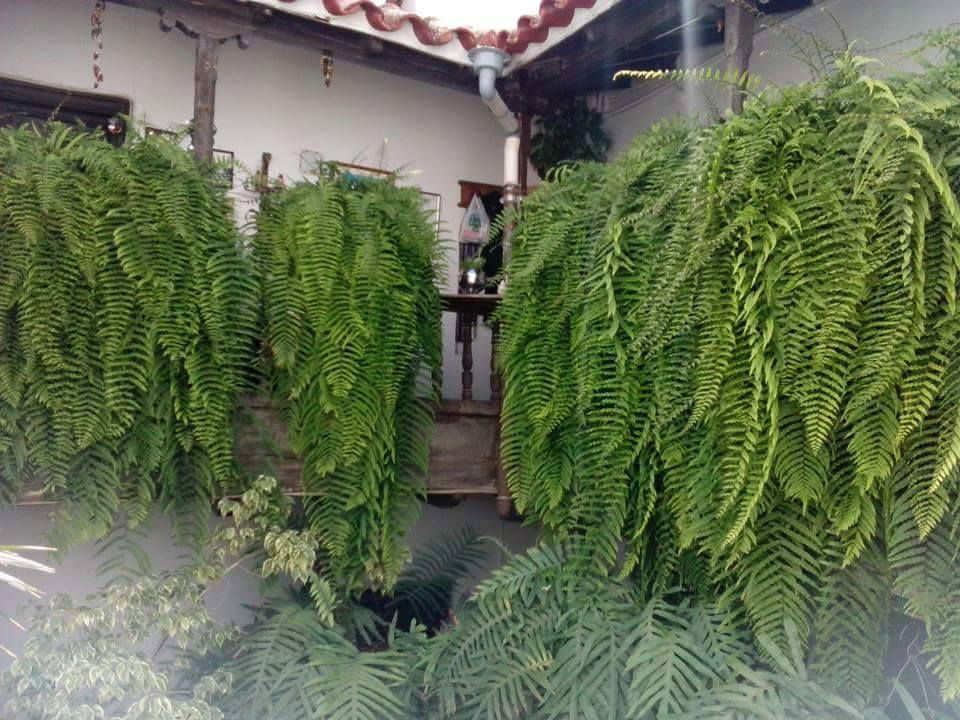
Inner courtyard of Casa Quintana in 2012

The remaining building preserves little of the century of its origin, the 16th century. Of this the most striking is a door on the left side of the inner courtyard that is topped by a late Gothic arc of memories, specifically those known as ogee arch.

The architecture conforms to the traditional domestic architecture of the well-to-do class of the Canary Islands: through its main facade crosses the vestibule that gives access to the interior courtyard, from which various rooms depart, as well as the staircase that leads to the upper floor. On this floor are found interesting Mudejar wood paneling with rococo details as well as the cupboard attached or recessed in the dining room.

Other locations of the inferior plants are the cellars and the old stable. The most characteristic architectural elements are located in the main façade, such as the portal framed by stonework that presents a chiaroscuro known as cushioning. This frame is of a frequent typology in different points of Gran Canaria. More precisely it displays a form in which the main door is united with a window of the superior plant that is decorated as well with the corresponding sill and the cornice that crowns the whole.

However, the façade has another more significant element: on its right side is a balcony of covered carpentry and with railing or handrail of lattice grid. It is an even more singular balcony because its location on the facade. It is on the right-hand side.

== Status ==
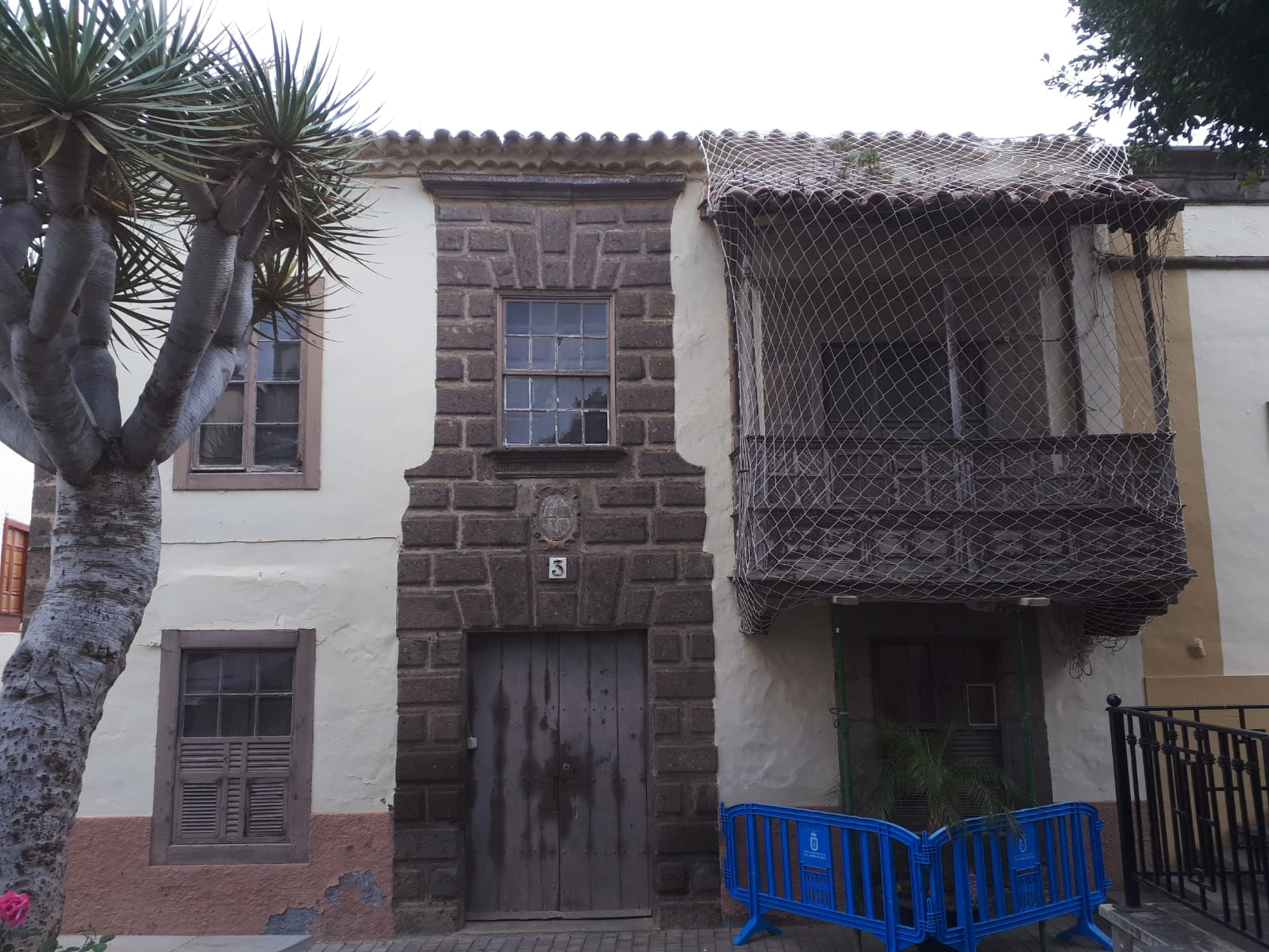
Casa Quintana currently in a state of neglect

This building is considered a Good of Cultural Interest within the Historic Site of Santa María of Guía de Gran Canaria for its history and artistic value, as well as for being in Guia's main square. It is in a semi-ruinous state.

Its last tenant departed in 2017.

== Gallery ==
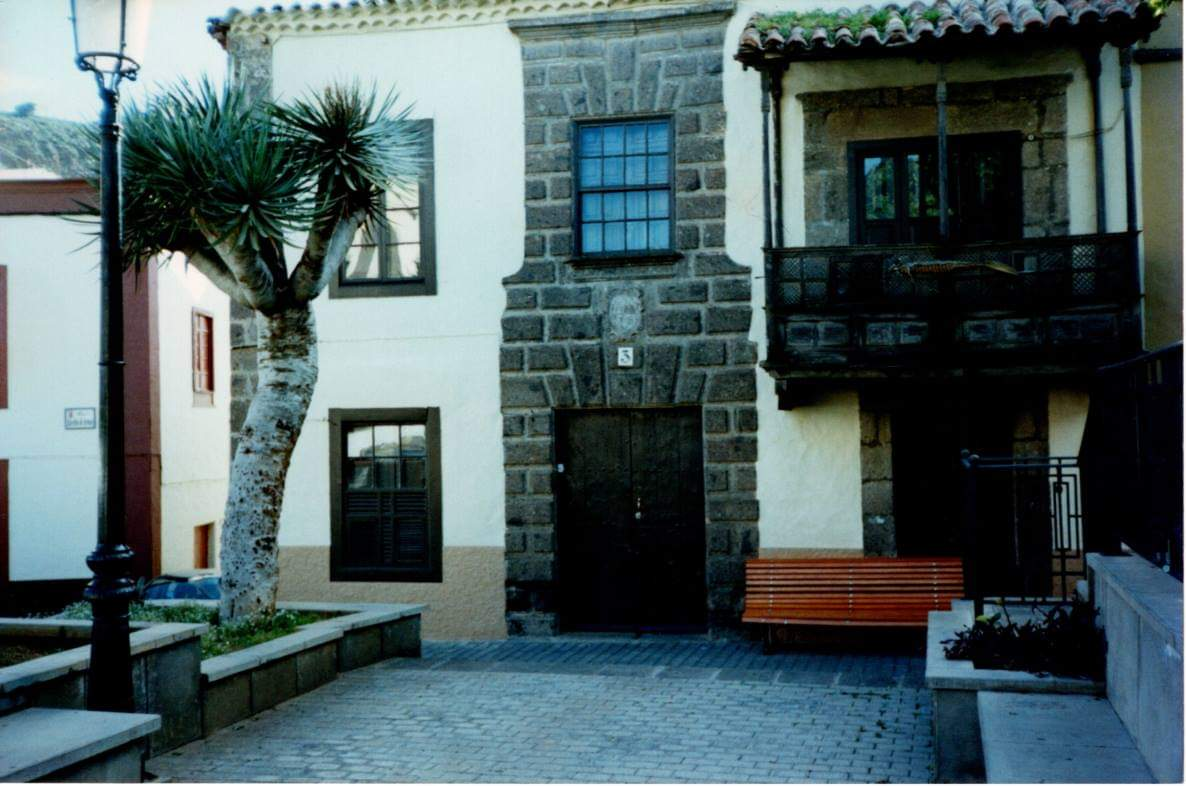
Façade of Casa Quintana in 2003.

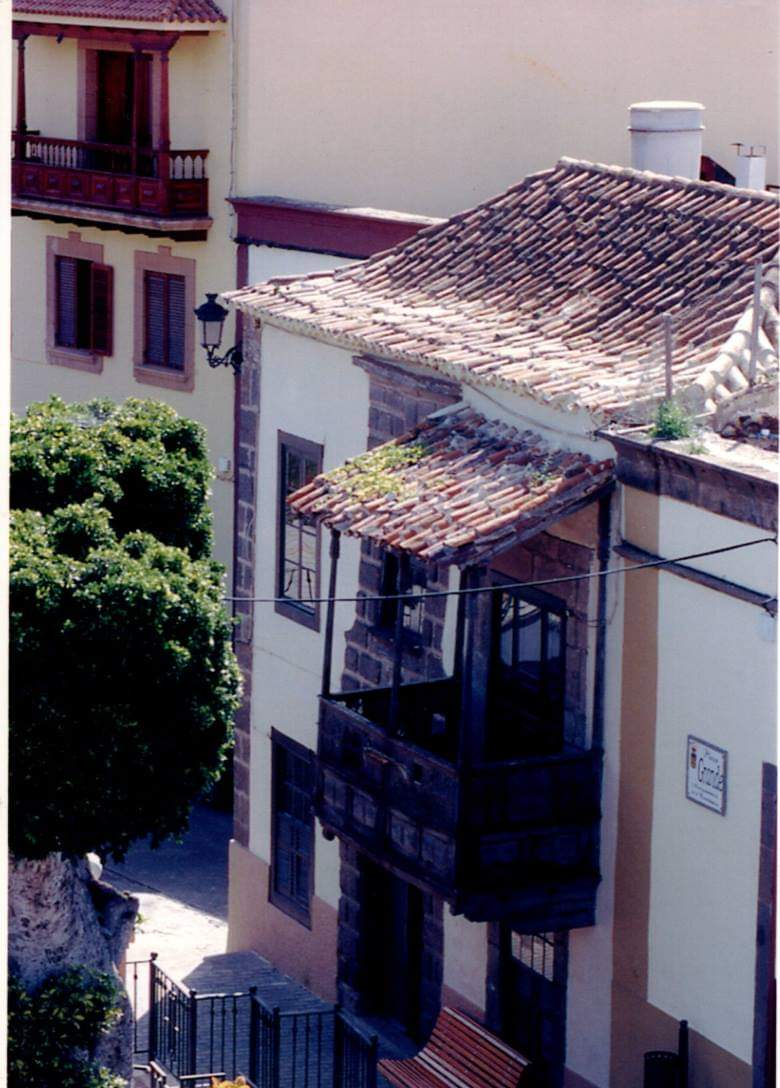
Side view of Casa Quintana in 2003.

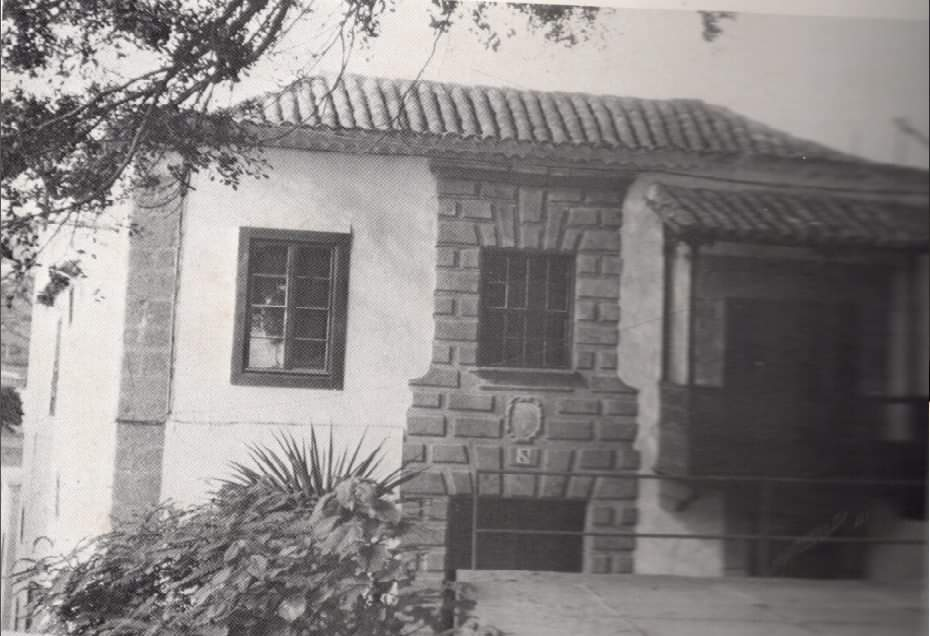
Casa Quintana in 1977.

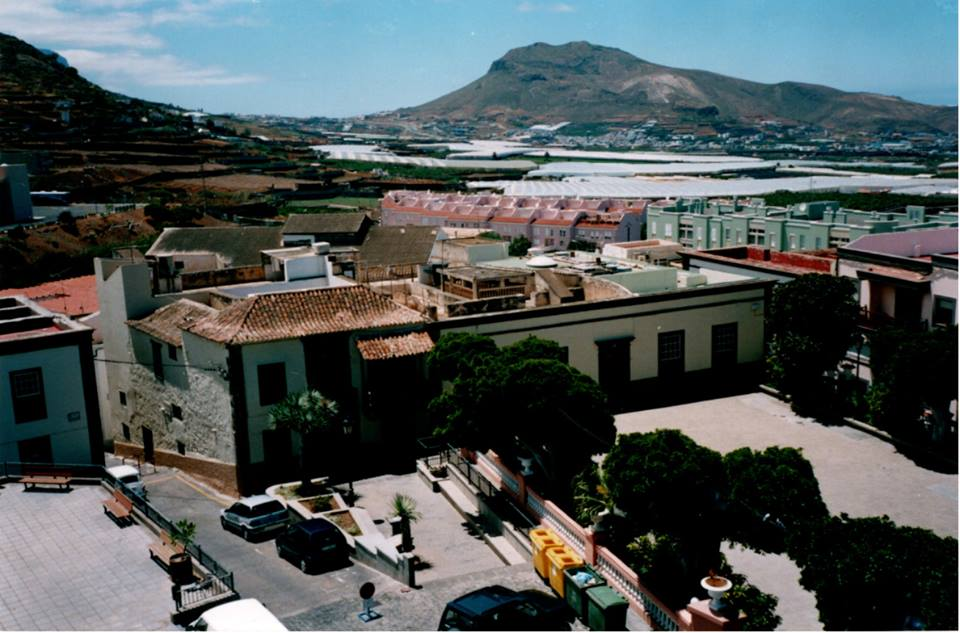
Casa Quintana from the Church of Guía in 2003.

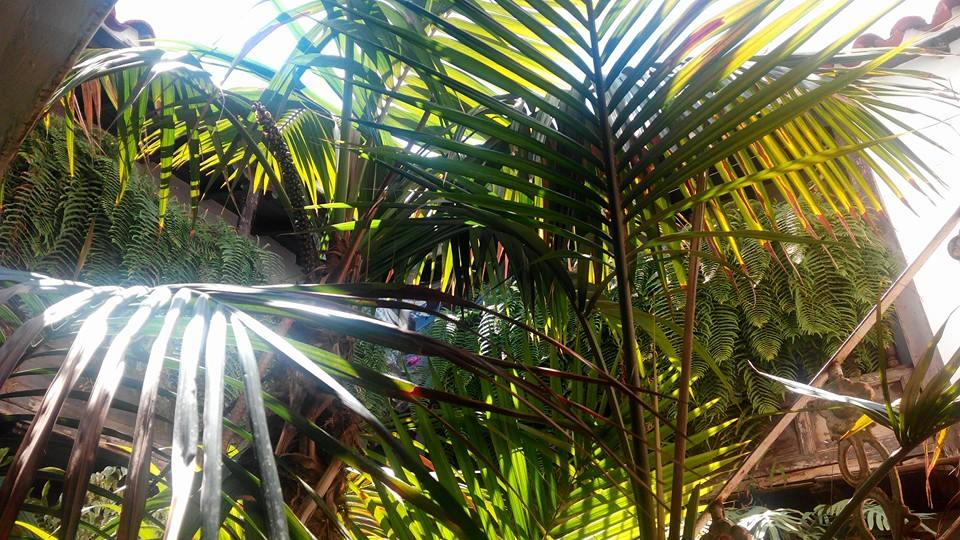
Interior courtyard of the Casa Quintana in 2012.

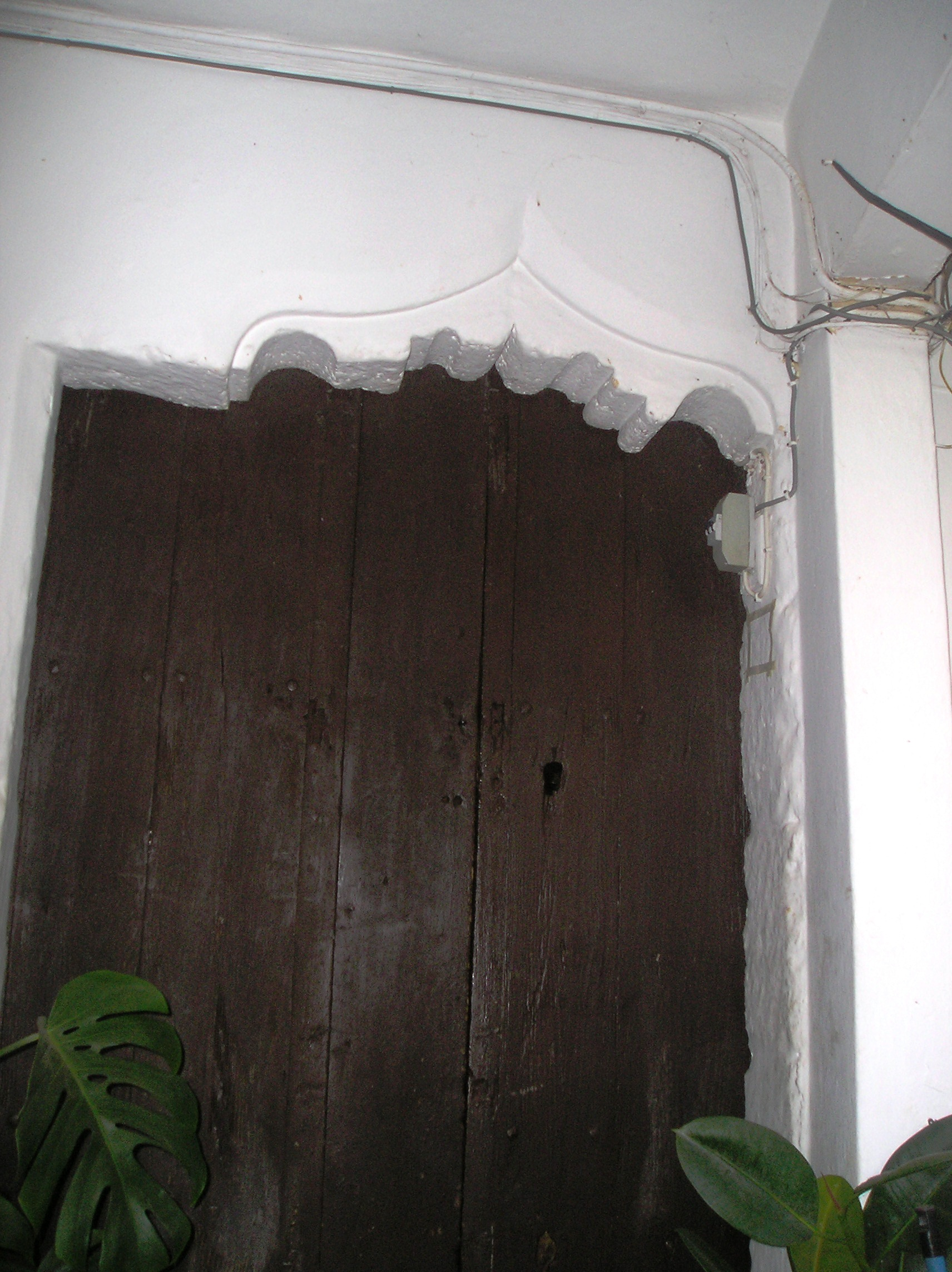
Door on the left side of the inner courtyard topped by an arch of memories of ogee arch.

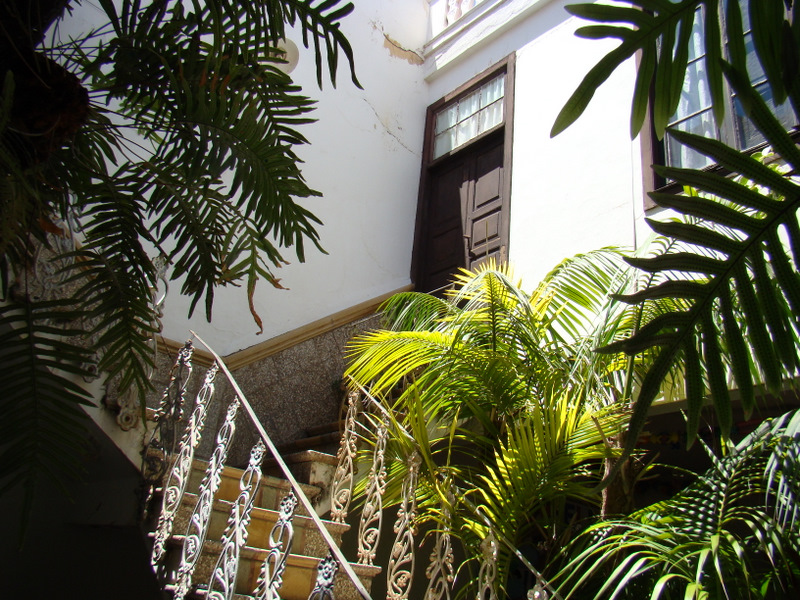
Access to the house from the right door of the interior patio.

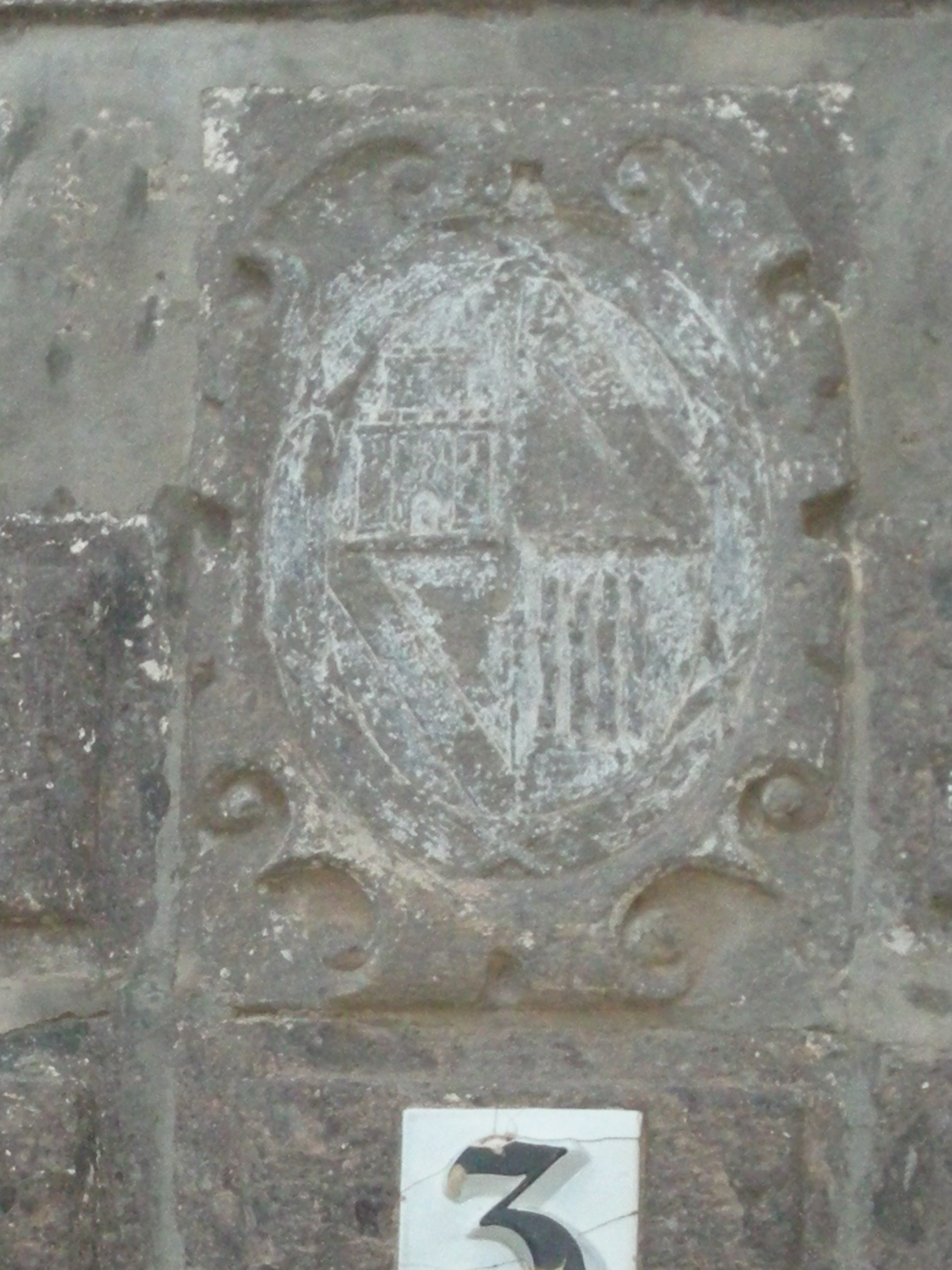
Blazon of the façade of the Casa Quintana.

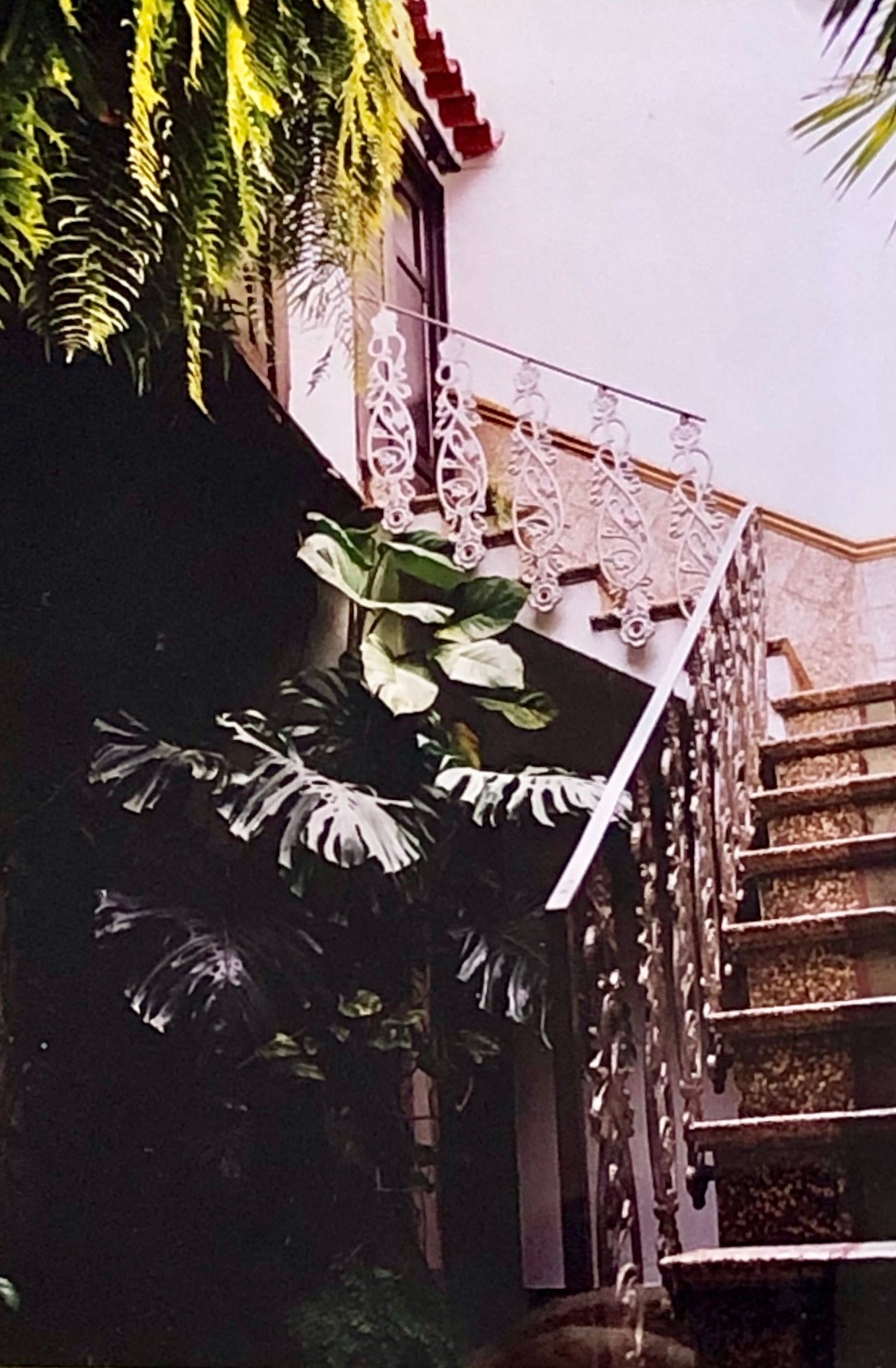
Access to the house from the inner courtyard from the left door.

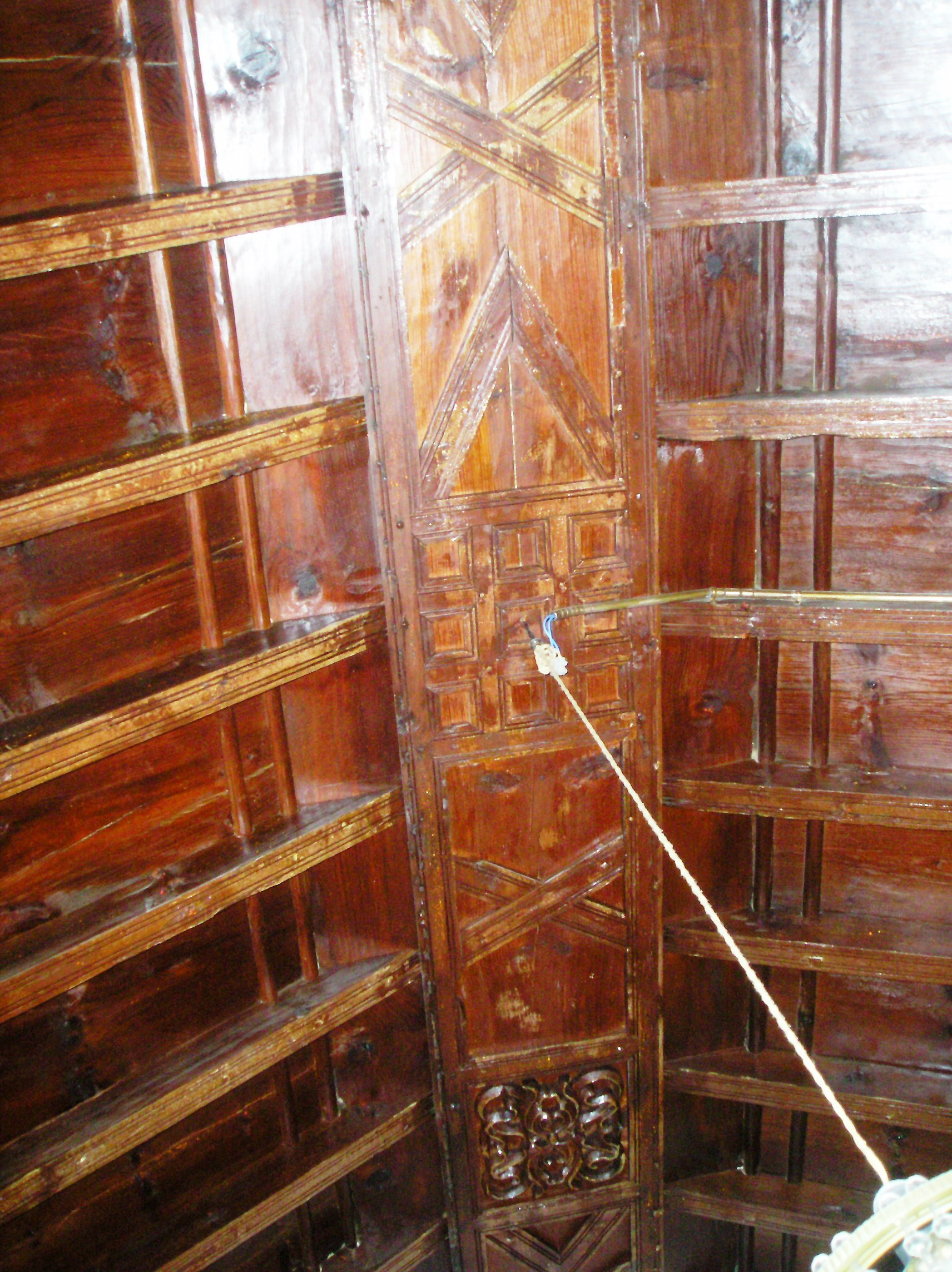
Tea roof of the salon

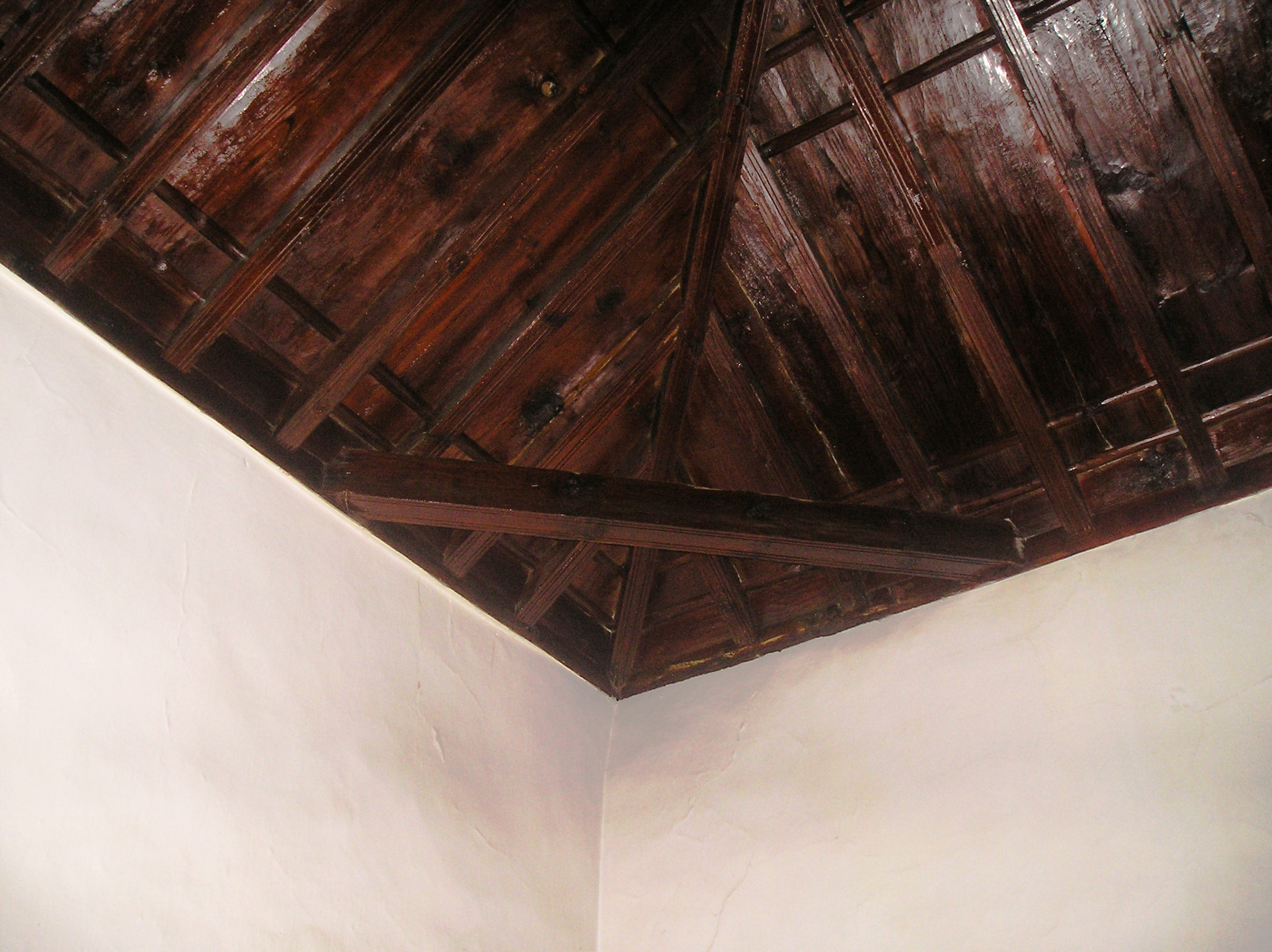
Corner of the roof of tea

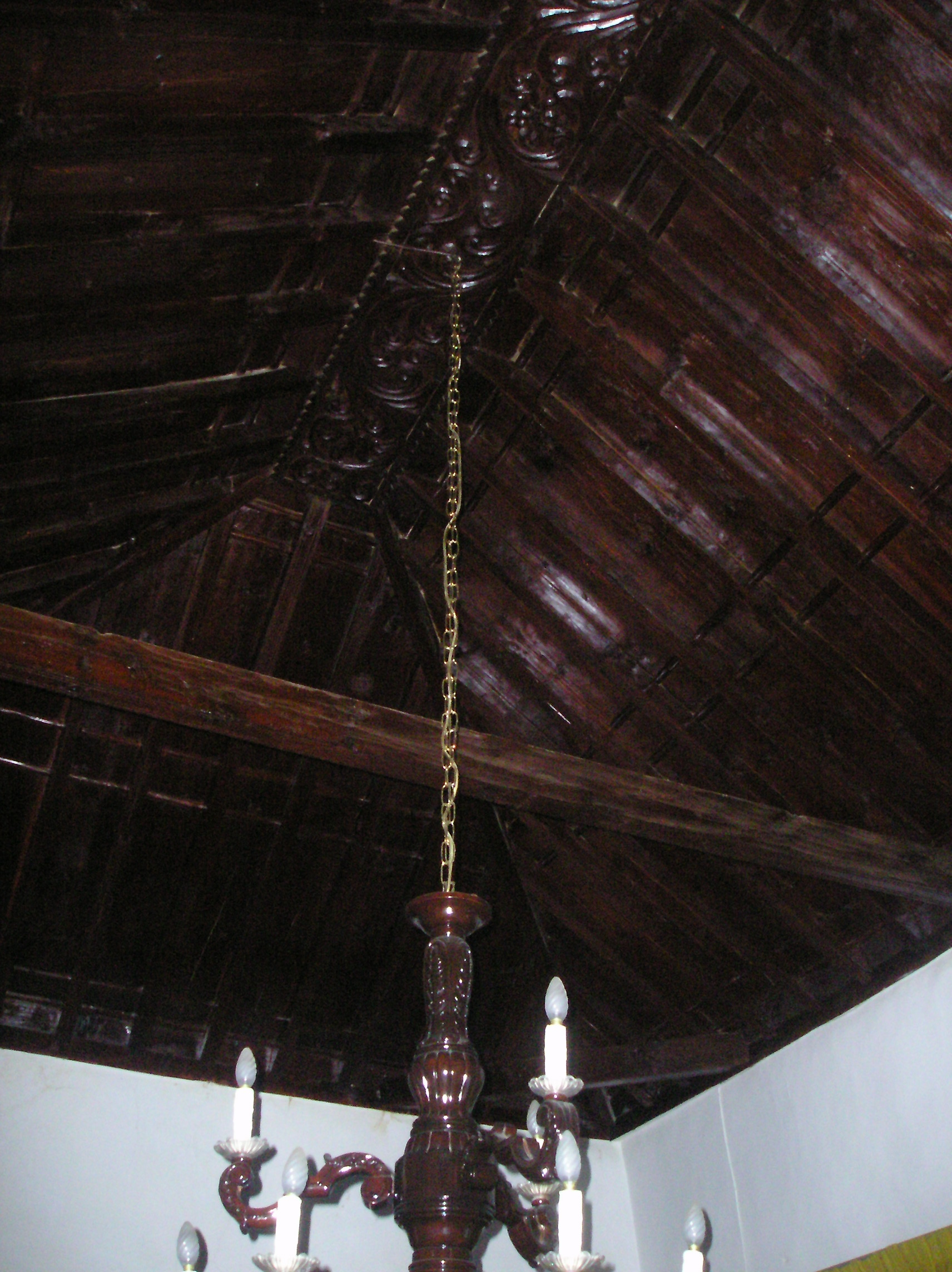
Tea roof of the living room and lamp.

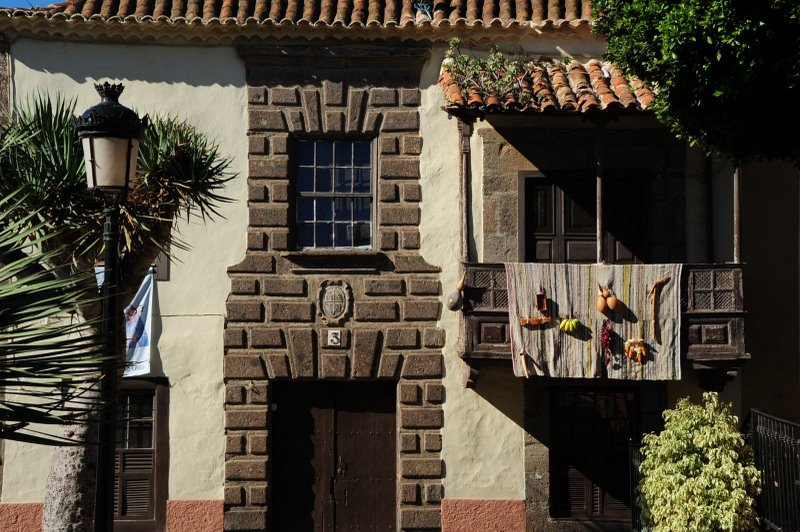
Casa Quintana in party.
