= Roberto Carlos '88 =

Studio album by Roberto Carlos
- Released: 1988
- Recorded: 1988
- Genre: Latin pop, Bolero
- Label: Sony

Roberto Carlos is a studio album by Brazilian pop singer Roberto Carlos. The album was first released in Portuguese and later in Spanish. The Spanish version reached #1 on the Latin Pop Albums charts along with the single, "Si El Amor Se Va", that reached #1 on the Hot Latin Tracks chart.

== Portuguese track listing ==
1. "Se Diverte E Ja Nao Pensa Em Mim"
2. "Todo Mundo E Alguem"
3. "Se Voce Disser Que Nao Me Ama"
4. "Como As Ondas Do Mar"
5. "Se O Amor Se Vai"
6. "Papo De Esquina"
7. "Eu Sem Voce"
8. "O Que E Que Eu Faco"
9. "Toda Va Filosofia"
10. "Volver"

== Album chart ==
This release reached the #1 position in Billboard Latin Pop Albums.

== Certifications ==
Certifications for "Roberto Carlos '88"
Region	Certification	Certified units/sales
Brazil (Pro-Música Brasil)	Diamond	1,000,000^{‡}
^{‡} Sales+streaming figures based on certification alone.

== See also ==
- List of Billboard Latin Pop Albums number ones from the 1980s
