= List of number-one songs of 1980 (Mexico) =

This is a list of the songs that reached number one in Mexico in 1980, with data provided by Radio Mil as published on the Billboard and Notitas Musicales magazines. Radio Mil had provided both magazines with charts for many years, however Billboard stopped regularly publishing their charts on September, so for continuity reasons the Notitas Musicales number-ones are also included in this article.

== Chart history (Billboard) ==
Issue date	Song	Artist(s)	Label	Ref
January 5	"Si me dejas ahora"	José José	Ariola	
January 11	"Si me dejas ahora"	José José	Ariola	
January 18	"Si me dejas ahora"	José José	Ariola	
February 9	"Si me dejas ahora"	José José	Ariola	
February 16	"Si me dejas ahora"	José José	Ariola	
February 25	"Si me dejas ahora"	José José	Ariola	
March 3	"Si me dejas ahora"	José José	Ariola	
March 17	"Si me dejas ahora"	José José	Ariola	
March 24	"Si me dejas ahora"	José José	Ariola	
April 4	"Que no"	Pedro Marín	Gamma	
April 13	"He venido a pedirte perdón"	Juan Gabriel	Ariola	
April 20	"He venido a pedirte perdón"	Juan Gabriel	Ariola	
April 25	"He venido a pedirte perdón"	Juan Gabriel	Ariola	
May 2	"He venido a pedirte perdón"	Juan Gabriel	Ariola	
May 13	"He venido a pedirte perdón"	Juan Gabriel	Ariola	
May 20	"He venido a pedirte perdón"	Juan Gabriel	Ariola	
May 27	"He venido a pedirte perdón"	Juan Gabriel	Ariola	
June 2	"He venido a pedirte perdón"	Juan Gabriel	Ariola	
June 17	"He venido a pedirte perdón"	Juan Gabriel	Ariola	
June 24	"Como yo te amo"	Raphael	Gamma	
July 8	"He venido a pedirte perdón"	Juan Gabriel	Ariola	
July 15	"He venido a pedirte perdón"	Juan Gabriel	Ariola	
August 30	"He venido a pedirte perdón"	Juan Gabriel	Ariola	
September 6	"Hey!"	Julio Iglesias	Columbia	

== Chart history (Notitas Musicales) ==
Unlike Billboard, Notitas Musicales was a bi-weekly magazine, and instead of publishing a single, general chart, Notitas published two separate charts on every issue:

- "Canciones que México canta" ("Songs that Mexico sings"), which listed the Top 10 most popular Spanish-language songs in Mexico, and
- "Hit Parade", which was a Top 10 of the most popular songs in Mexico that were in languages other than Spanish.

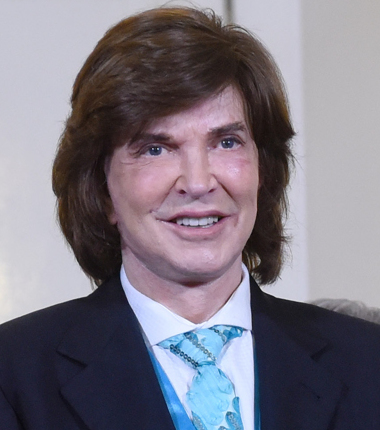
Spanish singer-songwriter Camilo Sesto wrote four of the Spanish-language #1 songs: "Quererte a ti" (recorded by Ángela Carrasco), "Si me dejas ahora" (recorded by José José), "Has nacido libre" and "Perdóname" (these two recorded by himself).

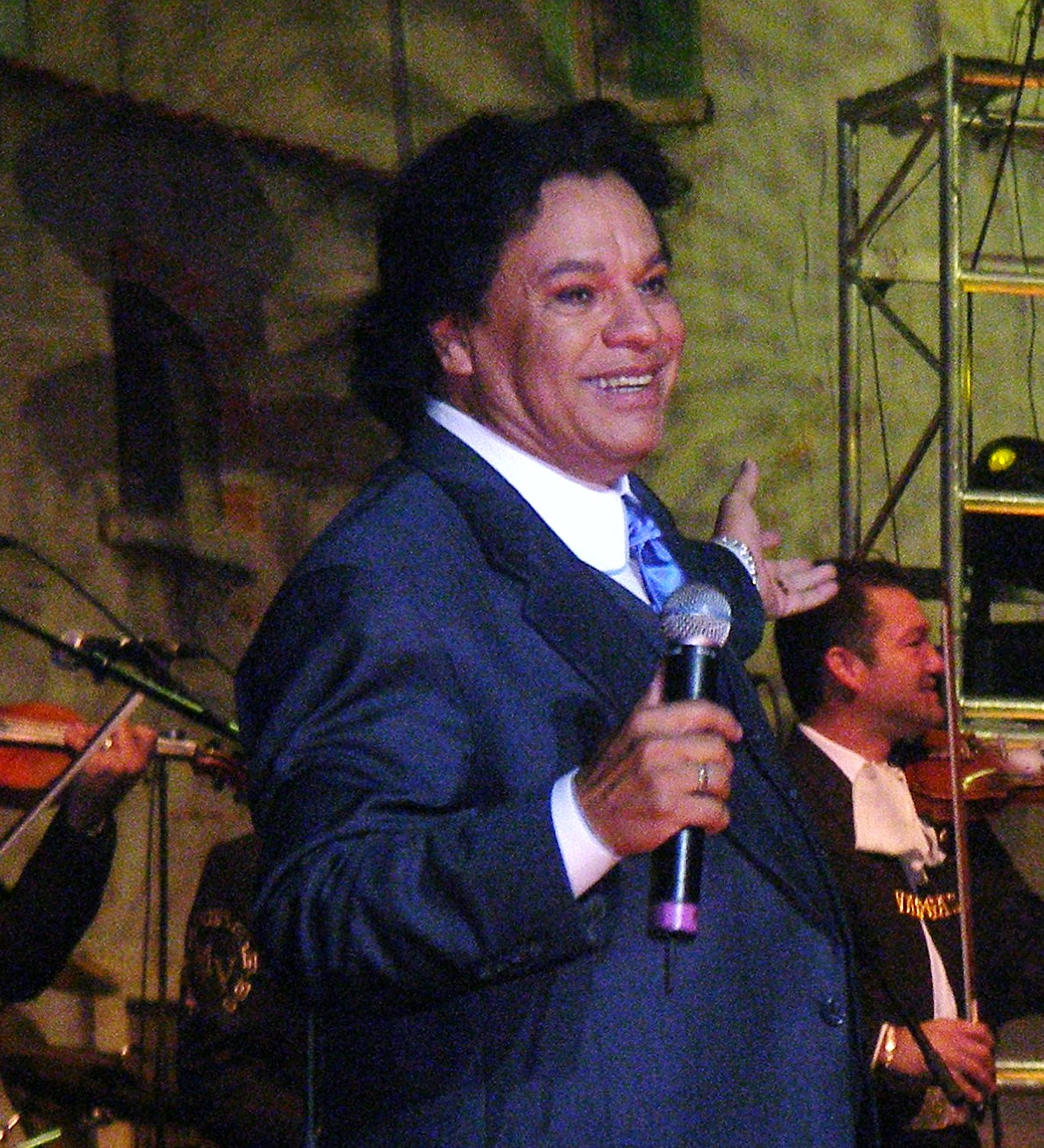
Mexican singer-songwriter Juan Gabriel had the longest run at the top of the Spanish-language chart, staying at #1 for four and a half months.

Issue Date	Spanish-language songs		Songs in other languages		Ref.
Issue Date	Song	Artist(s)	Song	Artist(s)	Ref.
1 January	"Quererte a ti"	Ángela Carrasco	"Savage Lover"	The Ring	
15 January	"Quererte a ti"	Ángela Carrasco	"My Sharona"	The Knack	
1 February	"Si me dejas ahora"	José José	"Savage Lover"	The Ring	
15 February	"Si me dejas ahora"	José José	"Savage Lover"	The Ring	
1 March	"No pongas ese disco"	Javier Santos	"Rapper's Delight"	The Sugarhill Gang	
15 March	"No pongas ese disco"	Javier Santos	"Rapper's Delight"	The Sugarhill Gang	
1 April	"Que no"	Pedro Marín / Samuel	"Crazy Little Thing Called Love"	Queen	
15 April	"Que no"	Pedro Marín / Samuel	"Crazy Little Thing Called Love"	Queen	
1 May	"He venido a pedirte perdón"	Juan Gabriel	"Crazy Little Thing Called Love"	Queen	
15 May	"He venido a pedirte perdón"	Juan Gabriel	"Dance Yourself Dizzy"	Liquid Gold	
1 June	"He venido a pedirte perdón"	Juan Gabriel	"Funkytown"	Lipps Inc.	
15 June	"He venido a pedirte perdón"	Juan Gabriel	"Funkytown"	Lipps Inc.	
1 July	"He venido a pedirte perdón"	Juan Gabriel	"Funkytown"	Lipps Inc.	
15 July	"He venido a pedirte perdón"	Juan Gabriel	"Funkytown"	Lipps Inc.	
1 August	"He venido a pedirte perdón"	Juan Gabriel	"Funkytown"	Lipps Inc.	
15 August	"He venido a pedirte perdón"	Juan Gabriel	"Funkytown"	Lipps Inc.	
1 September	"He venido a pedirte perdón"	Juan Gabriel	"Funkytown"	Lipps Inc.	
15 September	"Noa Noa"	Juan Gabriel	"Margherita"	Massara	
1 October	"Todo se derrumbó dentro de mí"	Emmanuel	"Margherita"	Massara	
15 October	"Todo se derrumbó dentro de mí"	Emmanuel	"Rock Lobster"	The B-52's	
1 November	"Todo se derrumbó dentro de mí"	Emmanuel	"It's Still Rock and Roll to Me"	Billy Joel	
15 November	"Todo se derrumbó dentro de mí"	Emmanuel	"It's Still Rock and Roll to Me"	Billy Joel	
1 December	"Has nacido libre"	Camilo Sesto	"It's Still Rock and Roll to Me"	Billy Joel	
15 December	"Perdóname"	Camilo Sesto	"It's Still Rock and Roll to Me"	Billy Joel	

== See also ==
- 1980 in music

== Sources ==
- Print editions of the Billboard magazine.
