= Si El Amor Se Va =

Single by Roberto Carlos

from the album Volver
- Released: 1988
- Recorded: 1988
- Genre: Latin pop · Latin ballad
- Length: 4:36
- Label: Discos CBS International
- Songwriter: Roberto Livi · Bebu Silvetti
- Producer: Mauro Motta

Roberto Carlos singles chronology
"Amor Perfecto" (1988)	"Si El Amor Se Va" (1988)	"Mis Amores" (1988)

"Si El Amor Se Va" (English: If Love Goes Away) is a song performed by Brazilian singer-songwriter Roberto Carlos. It was released as the second single from his studio album Volver (1988). The song became his first number-one single in the Billboard Hot Latin Tracks chart. It was written by Roberto Livi and co-written by Bebu Silvetti.

"Si El Amor Se Va" debuted in the chart at number 29 on October 8, 1988, and climbed to the top ten two weeks later. It reached the top position of the chart on November 19, 1988, replacing "Boca Rosa" by Dominican singer Ángela Carrasco and being replaced three weeks later by Rocío Dúrcal's "Cómo Tu Mujer". "Si El Amor Se Va" ranked at number 12 in the Hot Latin Tracks Year-End Chart of 1989. Lucía Méndez and Banda La Piñera also recorded their version of the song.

== Charts ==
Chart (1988)	Peak position
U.S. Billboard Hot Latin Tracks	1
