= Lo Bello y lo Prohibido =

Studio album by Braulio
- Released: 1986
- Recorded: 1986
- Studio: International Sound Studios, Criteria Studios, Quadradial Studios, Climax Recording Studio
- Genre: Latin pop (1980s)
- Label: CBS Discos
- Producer: Braulio · Ricardo Eddy Martínez

Braulio chronology
En La Cárcel de Tu Piel (1985)	Lo Bello y lo Prohibido (1986)	Con Todos Mis Sentidos (1988)

Lo Bello y lo Prohibido (Eng.: Beautiful and Forbidden) is a studio album recorded by Spanish singer-songwriter Braulio. It was released by CBS Discos in late 1986. This album was his first to top the Billboard Latin Pop Albums chart. The album yielded the singles "Juguete de Nadie", "En Bancarrota", "Noche de Boda" and "La Pu...ra Vida". "En Bancarrota" peaked at number-one in the Billboard Hot Latin Tracks chart for six weeks and was nominated for Best Latin Pop Performance at the 30th Annual Grammy Awards in 1988.

== Track listing ==
All tracks are written by Braulio García.

No.	Title	Length
1.	"La Pu...ra Vida"	3:35
2.	"Juguete de Nadie"	4:37
3.	"Fuí la Carnada"	4:26
4.	"Noche de Bodas"	4:00
5.	"Amor de Sal"	4:33
6.	"Por Si Piensas Regresar"	4:35
7.	"El Equilibrista"	4:38
8.	"En Bancarrota"	4:27
9.	"Lo Bello y lo Prohibido"	4:11

== Personnel ==
This information adopted from AllMusic.

- Ricardo Eddy Martínez – arranger, director, producer
- Braulio García – producer
- Eric Schilling – engineer, mixing
- Mike Cuzzi – engineer
- Ted Stein – engineer
- Mike Todd – assistant engineer
- Jerry Hinkle – photography

== Chart performance ==
Chart (1987)	Peak position
US Latin Pop Albums (Billboard)	1

== See also ==
- List of Billboard Latin Pop Albums number ones from the 1980s
