= Tutta la vita =

1984 song written and first performed by Lucio Dalla

Single by Lucio Dalla

from the album Viaggi organizzati
- Released: 1984
- Recorded: 1983
- Genre: Pop
- Length: 5:02
- Label: BMG Italy
- Songwriter: Lucio Dalla
- Producer: Mauro Malavasi

"Tutta la Vita" ("All Life Long") is a song written and first performed by Italian singer-songwriter Lucio Dalla. It was released in 1984 as the first single from his studio album Viaggi Organizzati, produced by Mauro Malavasi. This song is about a man searching for freedom all his life, trying not to fall in love, only to have a good time. For the Spanish-language market, two cover versions were released, and both peaked at number-one in the Billboard Hot Latin Tracks chart, the first by Cuban singer Franco and another by Mexican performer Emmanuel, spending three weeks each at the top position, being the first time (and only) in the Hot Latin Tracks chart history that two versions of the same song succeeded one another at the top. To date, it is uncertain who released the first cover version of the single.

== Franco version ==
"Toda La Vida"

Single by Franco

from the album Yo Canto
- Released: 1986
- Recorded: 1985
- Genre: Pop
- Length: 3:55
- Label: Peerless
- Songwriter: Lucio Dalla

Franco singles chronology
"Toda La Vida" (1986)	"María" (1987)

Franco's version of "Toda La Vida" was included on his first album titled Yo Canto (I Sing). According to his official website he released the first version of "Toda La Vida", peaking at number-one in United States, for three weeks, and in Mexico for 30 weeks, selling in both countries and in the rest of Latin America one million copies. The music video for the single was directed by Rodrigo García. This version spent 22 weeks in the American charts. It replaced Juan Gabriel's "Yo No Sé Qué Me Pasó" at the top of the Billboard Hot Latin Tracks chart, being succeeded by another version of the same song, by Mexican singer Emmanuel. This version ranked at number 32 in the recap made by VH1 Latin America for the 100 Greatest Songs of the 80's in Spanish.

=== Track listing ===
1. Toda La Vida – 3:55
2. Toda La Vida (Extended remix) – 7:53
3. Toda La Vida (Parts I and II) – 7:50

=== Chart performance ===
Chart (1986)	Peak position
US Billboard Hot Latin Tracks	1

== Emmanuel version ==
"Toda La Vida"
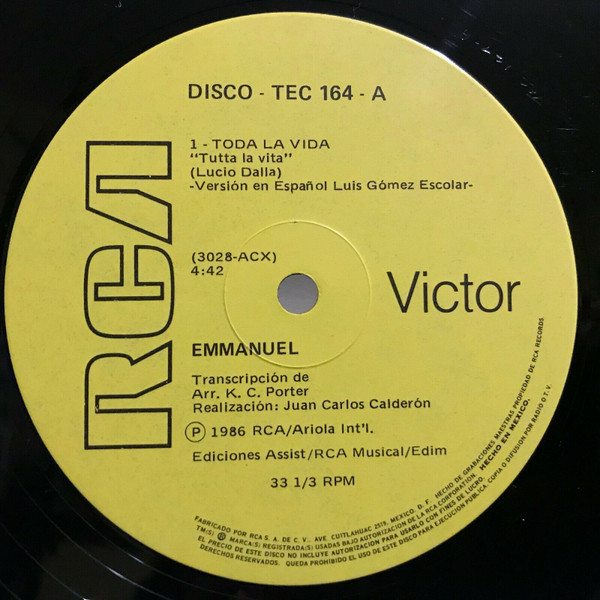

Single by Emmanuel

from the album Desnudo
- Released: 1986
- Recorded: 1985
- Genre: Pop
- Length: 4:50
- Label: RCA
- Songwriters: Lucio Dalla, Luis Gómez-Escolar
- Producer: Juan Carlos Calderón

Emmanuel singles chronology
"Toda La Vida" (1986)	"Es Mi Mujer" (1987)

"Toda La Vida" was released as the first single from Emmanuel's studio album Desnudo (released in United States as Solo). Luis Gómez-Escolar did the Spanish adaptation of the original track written by Lucio Dalla. According to the Mexican TV host Gloria Calzada, the first VJ of that country, while hosting Video Éxitos, the first television show showcasing music videos, aired between 1984 and 1986 on Televisa), this version was the first Spanish adaptation of the single. Emmanuel told her that he was the first one to discover Lucio Dalla's music in the 80's. This version, along with Franco's, ranked at number 32 in the recap made by VH1 Latin America for the 100 Greatest Songs of the 80's in Spanish. "Toda La Vida" is a staple in every live performance by Emmanuel.

=== Chart performance ===
Chart (1986)	Peak position
US Billboard Hot Latin Tracks	1

== Other cover versions ==
- In 1987, Canadian pianist and vocalist Cos Natola wrote and produced an entirely original English version of Tutta la Vita which was subsequently released as a single by RCA Records in Canada. Its flip-side was a Natola composition entitled "Being Free" (the Epilogue from the Cos Natola album entitled The Immigrant).
- In 1987, the Costa Rican team Saprissa released his new anthem "Viva Saprissa" using the melody of this song and changing the letter for the team.
- Also in 1988, Australian singer and actress Olivia Newton-John recorded a second English version of the song and included it on her album The Rumour, and additionally was used as the opening number to Olivia's musical tour of Australia titled Olivia Down Under.
- In 2008, Mexican singer Edith Márquez included another Spanish version of the song on her album Pasiones de Cabaret.

== See also ==
- List of number-one Billboard Top Latin Songs from the 1980s
