= Como Fui a Enamorarme de Ti =

"Cómo Fui a Enamorarme de Ti"

Single by Los Bukis

from the album Y Para Siempre
- Released: August 7, 1989
- Recorded: 1989
- Genre: Grupero slow ballad
- Length: 4:31
- Label: Fonovisa
- Songwriter: Marco Antonio Solís
- Producer: Marco Antonio Solís

Los Bukis singles chronology
"A Donde Vayas" (1989)	"Cómo Fui a Enamorarme de Ti" (1989)	"Me Dió Coraje" (1990)

"Cómo Fui a Enamorarme de Ti" (English: How Could I Have Fallen in Love With You) is a song written and produced Mexican singer-songwriter Marco Antonio Solís, and performed by him as the lead singer of Los Bukis. It was released as the second single from his 12th studio album Y Para Siempre (1989). This song became their second number-one single in the Billboard Top Latin Songs chart, after "Y Ahora Te Vas" one year prior.

The song lyrics were also used as the basis for the screenplay of the film of the same name released in 1991, and is widely recognized as one of the signature songs of the band, this track has been covered several times, including versions by Lucero, Yolanda del Río, Tito Nieves and Los Tri-O.

== Background ==
"Como Fui a Enamorarme de Ti" was released as the second single from Y Para Siempre (1989), a studio album released by Los Bukis. The song lyrics, about an unrequited love, were also the basis for the script of the film of the same name, directed by Sergio Olhovich and released in Mexico on May 21, 1991. The plot of the film was a love story between Marco Antonio Solís and a girl, played by Mexican actress Lourdes Munguía.

The song has been also included on several compilation albums released by Los Bukis, including their two number-one albums 30 Inolvidables (2002) and Crónica de Dos Grandes (2004); also has been covered by a handful of performers, including Banda Flamante, Yolanda del Río, Grupo Everest, Grupo Santa Clara, Lucero, La Nueva Luna, Estela Núñez, Oro Norteño, La Arrolladora Banda El Limón, Los Rieleros del Norte and Johnny Rivera. The track also can be found in the compilation album entitled La Historia Continúa, Vol. 2, which was the best-selling Latin album of 2005 in the United States and received a Platinum certification by the Recording Industry Association of America in 2009.

The music video for the song received a nomination for the Billboard Best Latin Video by a Duo or Group.

== Chart performance ==
The original version of the song debuted on the Billboard Top Latin Songs chart (formerly Hot Latin Tracks) at number 35 on August 26, 1989, and climbed to the top ten nine weeks later. It reached the top position of the chart on December 9, 1989, replacing "Fuiste un Trozo de Hielo en la Escarcha" by Puerto Rican-American performer Chayanne and being replaced two weeks later by Emmanuel's "La Chica de Humo". "Como Fui a Enamorarme de Ti" returned to the top of the chart on January 13, 1990, for another two weeks, being succeeded by the song "La Cima del Cielo" performed by Venezuelan singer-songwriter Ricardo Montaner. The song spent 39 weeks within the Top 40 and became the sixth top ten single for the group in the chart, and the second number-one hit, after "Y Ahora Te Vas" (1988).

Colombian group Los Tri-O, a project created by producer Johny Gutiérrez who held auditions to form a Latin ballads-oriented trio, also recorded a version of the track for their album Canciones del Alma: De Marco Antonio Solís. This version peaked at number 33 in the Latin Songs chart in United States. Puerto Rican performer Tito Nieves also released his own version of the song on his tribute album to Marco Antonio Solis, Canciones Clasicas de Marco Antonio Solis, and peaked at number 20 in the Billboard Latin Tropical Airplay chart.
