= Es Mi Mujer =

Single by Emmanuel

from the album Desnudo
- Released: 1987
- Recorded: 1985–1986
- Studio: Sintonía Studios; Hispavox; Torresonido (Madrid, Spain); Livingston Studios (London, England, United Kingdom)
- Genre: Latin • Italo disco
- Length: 3:31
- Label: RCA Ariola
- Songwriter: Luis Gómez-Escolar · K. C. Porter
- Producer: Juan Carlos Calderón

Emmanuel singles chronology
"Toda La Vida" (1986)	"Es Mi Mujer" (1987)	"No Te Quites la Ropa" (1987)

Music video
- "Es Mi Mujer" on YouTube

"Es Mi Mujer" ("It's My Woman") is a song written by Luis Gómez-Escolar and K. C. Porter, produced by Juan Carlos Calderón and performed by Mexican singer Emmanuel. It was released as the second single from his studio album Desnudo (1986) in early 1987. This song became the second number-one hit by the singer at the Billboard Hot Latin Tracks chart, after the three weeks reign of his single "Toda La Vida" in 1986. "Es Mi Mujer" was later covered by Johnny Ray and Banda Rugido.

== Chart performance ==
The song debuted on the Billboard Hot Latin Tracks chart at number 34 on January 10, 1987 and climbed to number-one twelve weeks later. It replace at the top of the chart "De Mí Enamórate" by Mexican singer Daniela Romo and was replaced four weeks later by Braulio's "En Bancarrota".

Chart (1987)	Peak position
US Billboard Hot Latin Tracks	1
