= Entre Lunas =

Studio album by Emmanuel
- Released: February 2, 1988
- Recorded: 1987
- Studio: Malavasi Studio (Bologna, Italy); Image Studio (Los Angeles, California); Midland Studio (Miami, Florida)
- Genre: Latin pop
- Label: RCA Ariola
- Producer: Emmanuel, Mauro Malavasi

Emmanuel chronology
Desnudo (1986)	Entre Lunas (1988)	Quisiera (1989)

Professional ratings
Review scores
Source	Rating
Allmusic	2.5/5 stars

Entre Lunas (Between Moons) is the ninth studio album recorded by Mexican performer Emmanuel, It was released by RCA Ariola in 1988. The album became his second number-one set on the Latin Pop Albums chart and was nominated for Pop Album of the Year at the 1st Lo Nuestro Music Awards.

== Track listing ==
1. Grito De Dos (Emmanuell, Malavasi)
2. Una Vieja Canción (Gaetano Curreri, Lucio Dalla, Emmanuel)
3. Qué Será (Emmanuel, Malavasi)
4. La Noche Arde (Emmanuel, Ricardo Eddy)
5. Esos Ojos (Luca Carboni, Luis Gomez Escolar)
6. La Última Luna (Dalla, Joaquin Sabina)
7. Y La Lluvia Entro (Emmanuel, Ed Arkin, Glenn Monroig, Mark Spiro
8. En La Noche (Eddy)
9. Desesperado (K.C. Porter, Monroig, Apiro)
10. No Me Sientes (Emmanuel, Malavasi)

== Personnel ==
- Primary Artist - Emmanuel

== See also ==
- List of Billboard Latin Pop Albums number ones from the 1980s
