= Yo No Sé Qué Me Pasó =

"Yo No Sé Que Me Pasó"

Single by Juan Gabriel

from the album Pensamientos
- Released: 1986
- Genre: Latin
- Length: 5:16
- Label: RCA
- Songwriter: Juan Gabriel
- Producer: Juan Gabriel

Juan Gabriel singles chronology
"Yo No Sé Que Me Pasó" (1986)	"Que Lastima" (1986)

"Yo No Sé Que Me Pasó" ("I Do Not Know What Happened To Me") is a song written, produced and performed by Mexican singer-songwriter Juan Gabriel. It was released in 1986 as the first single from his studio album Pensamientos. This song deals with the end of a love relationship, falling out of love. It peaked at number-one in the Billboard Hot Latin Tracks chart on September 13, 1986, being the second song to do so, replacing "La Guirnalda", another song written by Gabriel; however, in the printed version of the same chart, the song is recognized as the first song ever to top the chart. "Yo No Sé Qué Me Pasó" has been covered by Rocío Dúrcal, Pedro Fernández and Julio Preciado.

== Chart performance ==
Chart (1986)	Peak position
US Billboard Hot Latin Tracks	1

== See also ==
- List of number-one Billboard Top Latin Songs from the 1980s
