= Braulio García =

Spanish singer-songwriter

Braulio
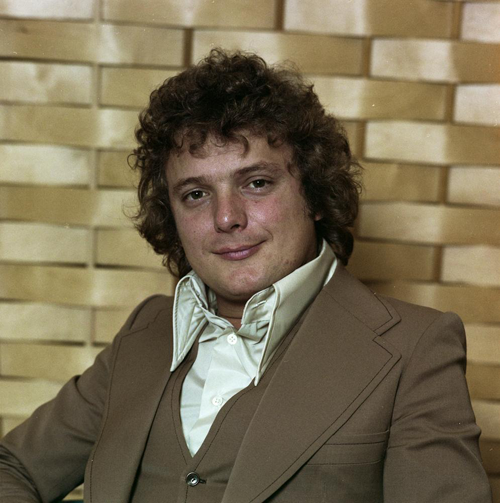
- Braulio in 1976

Background information
- Born: Braulio Antonio García Bautista; 22 July 1946 (age 79); Santa María de Guía de Gran Canaria (Las Palmas), Spain
- Occupation: Singer-songwriter

Braulio Antonio García Bautista (Spanish pronunciation: [ˈbɾawljo ɣaɾˈθi.a]; born 22 July 1946 in Santa María de Guía de Gran Canaria, Canary Islands), better known as Braulio, is a Spanish singer-songwriter.

== Career ==
He began his career in 1971, debuting in a local festival with a song called "Mi amigo el pastor". He represented Spain in the Eurovision Song Contest 1976 with the song "Sobran las palabras" ("Words are unnecessary"). He placed 16th in a field of 18. Over the years he also participated in some other song festivals: three times at the Benidorm Song Festival (1973, 1975 and 1981); at the Viña del Mar International Song Festival in 1979, where he got the main prize; or at the Yamaha Music Festival in 1982.

In 1979, the Viña del Mar-winning song "A tu regreso a casa" became his breakthrough to become a star in the Latin music scene. During the 1970s he recorded albums that were mostly released in Spain. After signing up with CBS, Grammy-nominated singer-songwriter Braulio recorded his first major album, entitled En la Carcel de Tu Piel, followed by Lo Bello y lo Prohibido, which peaked at number one on the Billboard Latin Pop Albums chart, received a Grammy nomination for Best Latin Pop Performance and yielded the single "En Bancarrota", a number-one single for six weeks on the Hot Latin Tracks chart.

Braulio has written songs for Alfredo Kraus, Añoranza, Cheo Feliciano, Dyango, Garoé, José José, José Vélez, Lissette, Los Gofiones, Los Granjeros, Los Sabandeños, Lourdes Robles, Manoella Torres, Massiel, Mestisay, Tony Vega, and Yolandita Monge.

Preceded by Sergio y Estíbaliz with "Tú volverás"	Spain in the Eurovision Song Contest; 1976	Succeeded by Micky with "Enséñame a cantar"
