= Savage Lover =

1979 song by The Ring

"Savage Lover" is a 1979 hit recording by the American disco group, The Ring. The tune was produced and written by studio musician - composer Marcus Barone and the professional musician Fausto Lucignani who also co-produced the hit record. Savage Lover hit #1 on the Pop Charts in Mexico for weeks and #7 in Argentina. It hit #14 on the American Dance Billboard charts. The Ring disbanded in 1981, yet Savage Lover was often still played throughout the 1980s in the United States and Mexico. It was released by Vanguard as a single in 1979 and was featured on The Ring's debut album in 1981. The track was mixed by disco consultant Ray 'Pinky" Velazquez.
