= Santa María de Guía de Gran Canaria =

- Municipality
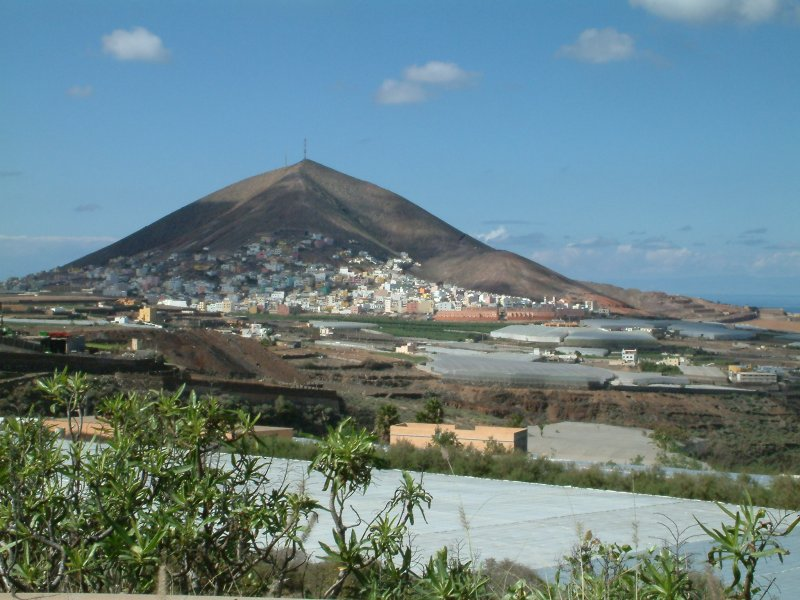
- View of La Atalaya

- Flag Coat of arms

- Municipal location in Gran Canaria

- Location in the province of Las Palmas Santa María de Guía de Gran Canaria (Canary Islands) Santa María de Guía de Gran Canaria (Spain, Canary Islands)
- Coordinates: 28°8′20″N 15°37′58″W
- Country: Spain
- Autonomous Community: Canary Islands
- Province: Las Palmas
- Island: Gran Canaria

Government
  - Mayor: Pedro Manuel Rodríguez Pérez (Nueva Canarias)

Area
  - Total: 42.59 km^{2} (16.44 sq mi)
- Elevation (AMSL): 180 m (590 ft)

Population (2025-01-01)
  - Total: 14,311
  - Density: 336.0/km^{2} (870.3/sq mi)
- Time zone: UTC+0 (CET)
  - Summer (DST): UTC+1 (CEST (GMT +1))
- Postal code: 35450
- Area code: +34 (Spain) + 928 (Las Palmas)
- Website: www.santamariadeguia.es

Santa María de Guía de Gran Canaria is a town and a municipality in Las Palmas province of the Canary Islands. It is located on the north side of Gran Canaria island. Its population is 13,811 (2013), and the area is 42.59 km^{2} (16.44 sq mi).

The town Santa María de Guía is situated in a valley 2 km (1 mi) from the coast, 19 km (12 mi) west of Las Palmas. The municipality stretches from the coast into the mountainous interior of the island. The GC-2 motorway passes north of the town.

== Toponymy ==
Currently the municipality takes its name from its municipal capital, combining the invocation of its primitive hermitage founded in honor of Santa María de Guía at the end of the fifteenth century.

During the aboriginal stage of the island, which ends in the year 1483, the population nucleus received the denomination of Aguía, corresponding to the existing population in the same location of the historical center and its surroundings, and also near the aboriginal from Agaldar, capital of a guanarteme chiefdom. This denomination was maintained until 1555, as indicated in the land and water distribution documents of Gran Canaria, granted after the European conquest of the island.

After the European conquest, the historical nucleus was named as Villa de Guía, in short Guía, and it remained that way throughout the colonial period, until the 19th century. Already in the 19th century it begins to predominate the denomination of Guia de Gran Canaria, within a stream of administrative modernization, and especially to differentiate it from other homonymous populations such as Guía de Isora, on the island of Tenerife.

Already in the twentieth century and within the period of the Franco dictatorship, on December 28, 1962, the mayor of that time, Rafael Velázquez García, proposed to change the official name to that of Santa María de Guía, incorporating the invocation of the Catholic religious temple existing in the municipality since the 16th century. The change was approved in full by the local corporation on April 26, 1963, subsequently obtaining the approval of the Island Council de Gran Canaria, which had been denied in the first instance, the change being to Santa María de Guía de Gran Canaria by agreement of the Council of Ministers of the Franco government on July 23, 1963.

In 2008, the City Council promoted a debate from the municipal website for neighbors to express their opinion on whether or not to officially retake the name of Guía de Gran Canaria.

== Geography ==
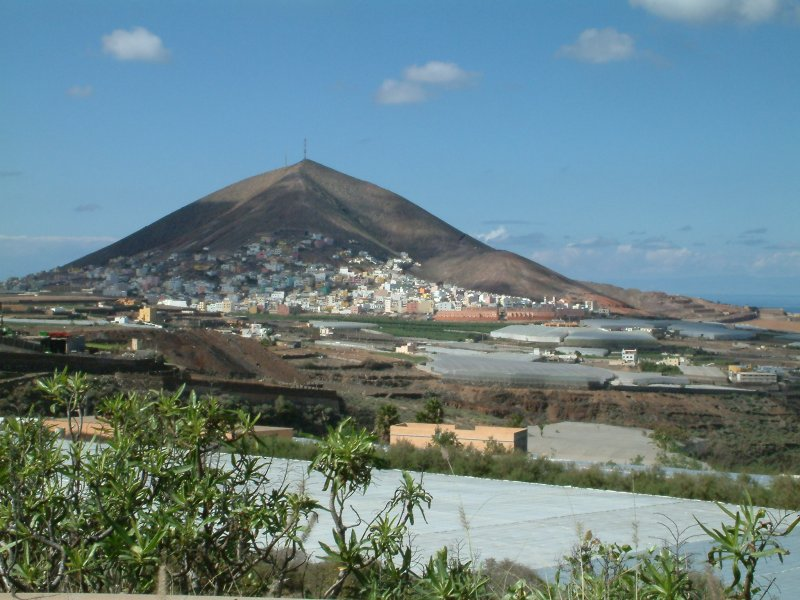
View of The Watchtower of Sta. Mª de Guía.

Located in the north of Gran Canaria, the municipality has a triangular shape, which places its vertex towards the south, near the caldera of the Pinos de Gáldar. To the east it borders the municipality of Moya defined by Barranco de Moya until its mouth. To the west, the division follows some channels, surrounds the Pico de La Atalaya or Gáldar mountain, and continues to the coast, dividing the Pico de la Atalaya in two.

The coastline is defined between Caleta de Arriba until the mouth of the Barranco de Moya. The coasts are rocky due to erosion, cliffs predominating, with exceptions such as San Felipe beach, which in summer is covered with sand.

=== Climatology ===
The climatic conditions of Santa María de Guía derive from its northern position. Thus, there are three altitudinal steps, which are:

- The coastal zone, which reaches up to 300 meters;
- The medians between 300 and 600 meters;
- The high zone, from 600 meters.

As it enters the interior of the island the number of sunny days per year is less; It rains more and temperatures are generally lower.

== Population ==
Historical population

| Year | Pop. | ±% |
|---|---|---|
| 1991 | 12,383 | — |
| 1996 | 13,117 | +5.9% |
| 2001 | 13,893 | +5.9% |
| 2002 | 14,171 | +2.0% |

| Year | Pop. | ±% |
|---|---|---|
| 2003 | 14,255 | +0.6% |
| 2004 | 14,107 | −1.0% |
| 2013 | 13,811 | −2.1% |

== Heritage sites ==
The caves of Valerón, also called cenobio de Valerón, is a property of cultural interest in the "archaeological site" category. It is the largest pre-Hispanic collective granary. Its size is representative of Gran Canaria agriculture, unique among the Canaries islands in that it was traditionally dominated by plantations, much of these being grains, rather than by stock-breeding.

The Quintana House is a sample of the ancient architecture of the municipality of Guia de Gran Canaria in the Canarian island of Gran Canaria, located in the Plaza Mayor de Guía and its buildings date from the 16th century. The Canarian balcony is of Mudejar style, in wood and coat of arms with the surnames Guanarteme and Quintana.

== See also ==
- List of municipalities in Las Palmas
