= María (Franco song) =

Single by Franco

from the album Definitivo
- Released: 1988
- Recorded: 1988
- Genre: Latin
- Length: 4:16
- Label: Peerless
- Songwriters: Marcelo Molina, Gustavo Márquez, Teddy Jauren

Franco singles chronology
"Muriendo Aquí" (1987)	"María" (1988)	"Bonito y Sabroso" (1990)

"María" is a song written by Marcelo Molina, Gustavo Márquez and Teddy Jauren and performed by Cuban singer Franco. It was released in 1988 as a single from Franco's album Definitivo (1988) and became his second number-one single in the Billboard Top Latin Songs chart, after "Toda La Vida" in 1986. It ended 1988 as the fourth best-performing single of the year.

Chart (1988)	Peak position
U.S. Billboard Top Latin Songs	1
