= List of number-one hits of 1968 (Mexico) =

This is a list of songs that reached number one in Mexico according to Billboard magazine (with data provided by Audiomusica), and the Notitas Musicales magazine (with data provided by Núcleo Radio Mil, which would later provide data for Billboard as well).

For unknown reasons (presumably Audiomusica's closure), the Billboard magazine did not feature any Mexican charts after the week of March 30, 1968, and only began to publish them again in March 1969 (by this time, they were using Núcleo Radio Mil as their source as well). For continuity reasons, the Notitas Musicales #1s are also included in this article.

== Audiomusica ==
=== Chart history ===
Issue date	Song	Artist(s)	Ref.
January 6	"Esta tarde vi llover"	Armando Manzanero	
January 13	"Esta tarde vi llover"	Armando Manzanero	
January 20	"Esta tarde vi llover"	Armando Manzanero	
January 27	"Esta tarde vi llover"	Armando Manzanero	
February 3	"Esta tarde vi llover"	Armando Manzanero	
February 10	"Look Out (Here Comes Tomorrow)"	The Monkees	
February 17	"Yo, tú y las rosas"	Los Piccolinos	
February 24	"Yo, tú y las rosas"	Los Piccolinos	
March 2	"Norma, la de Guadalajara"	Pérez Prado y su Orquesta	
March 9	"Norma, la de Guadalajara"	Pérez Prado y su Orquesta	
March 16	"Norma, la de Guadalajara"	Pérez Prado y su Orquesta	
March 23	"Norma, la de Guadalajara"	Pérez Prado y su Orquesta	
March 30	"Norma, la de Guadalajara"	Pérez Prado y su Orquesta	

=== By country of origin ===
Number-one artists:

Country of origin	Number of artists	Artists
Mexico	2	Armando Manzanero
Mexico	2	Los Piccolinos
Cuba / Mexico	1	Pérez Prado y su Orquesta
United States	1	The Monkees

Number-one compositions (it denotes the country of origin of the song's composer[s]; in case the song is a cover of another one, the name of the original composition is provided in parentheses):

Country of origin	Number of compositions	Compositions
Cuba	1	"Norma, la de Guadalajara"
Italy	1	"Io, tu e le rose" ("Yo, tú y las rosas")
Mexico	1	"Esta tarde vi llover"
United States	1	"Look Out (Here Comes Tomorrow)"

== Núcleo Radio Mil ==
=== Chart history ===
Issue Date	General chart		Hit Parade (songs in other languages)		Ref.
Issue Date	Song	Artist(s)	Song	Artist(s)	Ref.
January	"La balada del vagabundo"	Rosa Mary & José Guardiola	"Gimme Little Sign"	Brenton Wood	
February	"Hazme una señal"	Roberto Jordán	"Gimme Little Sign"	Brenton Wood	
March	"Rosas en el mar"	Massiel	"Love is Blue"	Paul Mauriat	
April	"Mi gran noche"	Raphael	"Love is Blue"	Paul Mauriat	
May	"Mi gran noche"	Raphael	"Love is Blue"	Paul Mauriat	
June	"Mi gran noche"	Raphael	"Love is Blue"	Paul Mauriat	
July	"Love is Blue"	Paul Mauriat	"Young Girl"	Gary Puckett & The Union Gap	
August	"Palabras"	Johnny Dynamo y Los Leos	"Words"	Bee Gees	
September	"Palabras"	Johnny Dynamo y Los Leos	"Words"	Bee Gees	
October	"Palabras"	Johnny Dynamo y Los Leos	"Hey Jude"	The Beatles	
November	"Palabras"	Johnny Dynamo y Los Leos	"Hey Jude"	The Beatles	
December	"Palabras"	Johnny Dynamo y Los Leos	"Hey Jude"	The Beatles	

== See also ==
- 1968 in music

== Sources ==
- Print editions of the Billboard magazine from January 13 to March 30, 1968.
- Print editions of the Notitas Musicales magazine.
