= Franco (singer) =

Cuban Latin pop singer (born 1959)

Franco Javier Iglesias, better known mononymously as Franco (born 14 December 1959) is a Cuban Latin pop singer. He achieved two number-one songs on the Billboard Hot Latin Songs chart with his cover of "Toda la Vida in 1986 and "María" in 1988. The latter song received a Lo Nuestro nomination for Pop Song of the Year in 1989.
