= Ángela Carrasco =

Dominican Republic singer (born 1951)

- Born: Ángela Altagracia Carrasco Rodríguez; 23 January 1951 (age 75); Montecristi, Dominican Republic
- Occupation: Singer
- Instruments: Vocals
- Years active: 1970–present

Ángela Altagracia Carrasco Rodríguez (born 23 January 1951) is a Dominican singer. She rose to prominence in Spain in the 1970s and recorded a series of hits across Latin America, Spain and the United States, and in 2015 received the Latin Grammy Lifetime Achievement Award.

== Early life ==
Carrasco was born in Montecristi. At the age of seven she appeared in advertising, singing a jingle for a soft drink to a tune composed by Salvador Sturla.

== Career ==
Carrasco moved from the Dominican Republic to Spain, where she was cast as Mary Magdalene opposite Camilo Sesto in the first Spanish-language production of Jesus Christ Superstar in the mid-1970s. In the late 1970s she recorded the singles "Cariño mío" ("Love of Mine") and "Quererte a ti" ("Loving You"), the latter of which was released across Latin America, the United States and Europe.

She later recorded the albums Dama del Caribe, Candela and Ángela. Her single "Boca rosa" reached number one on the Billboard Hot Latin Tracks chart in late 1988.

Carrasco continued to record, releasing the album Muy personal, which combined new material with new versions of earlier songs including "No, no hay nadie más" and "No sé cómo amarle", the Spanish version of "I Don't Know How to Love Him" from Jesus Christ Superstar. She has also worked in theatre.

== Awards ==
In 1993, Carrasco received the Lo Nuestro Award for Tropical Female Artist of the Year.

In September 2015, the Latin Recording Academy named Carrasco one of the recipients of that year's Lifetime Achievement Award, alongside Gato Barbieri, Ana Belén and Víctor Manuel, Djavan, El Gran Combo de Puerto Rico and Pablo Milanés. The awards were presented at the KÀ Theatre at the MGM Grand in Las Vegas on 18 November 2015, during the week of the 16th Annual Latin Grammy Awards.
