= Emmanuel (singer) =

Mexican singer (born 1955)

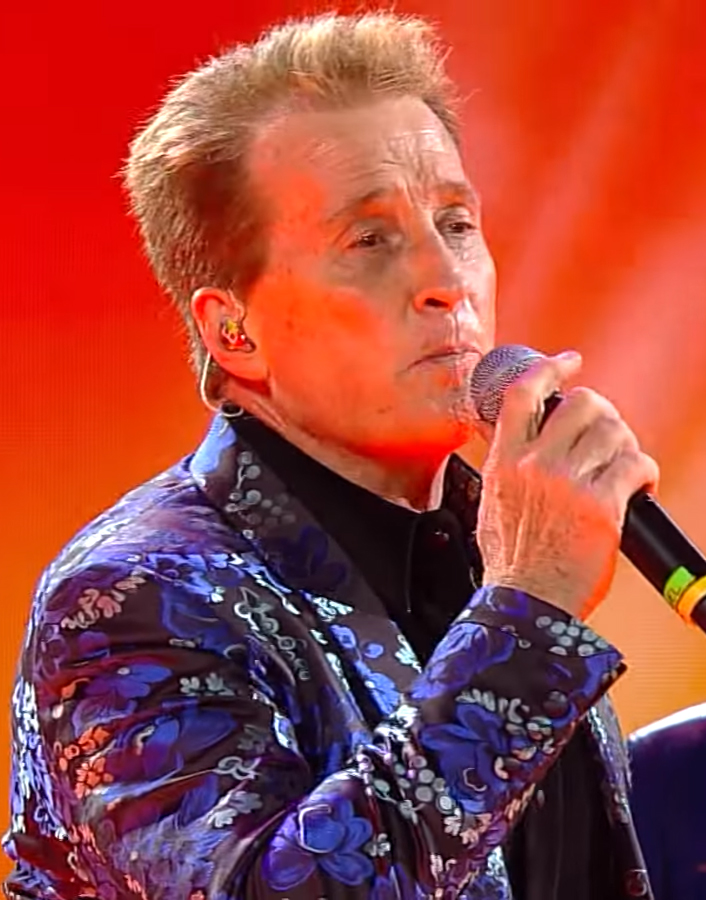

Background information
- Born: Jesús Emmanuel Arturo Acha Martinez; 16 April 1955 (age 71)
- Origin: Mexico City, Mexico
- Genre: Latin pop
- Occupations: Singer, songwriter, musician, producer
- Instruments: Vocals (tenor), guitar, piano
- Years active: 1976–present
- Labels: RCA Victor; Ariola Records; Columbia Records; Sony Music; Sony BMG; Polygram Records; Universal Music
- Website: www.emmanuel.com.mx

Jesús Emmanuel Arturo Acha Martinez (born 16 April 1955) is a Mexican singer. He is known for a career spanning five decades. With 20 studio albums released and over 10 million records sold worldwide, he is considered one of the best-selling Latin music artists in history. He has received both the Billboard Latin Music Lifetime Achievement Award and the Latin Grammy Lifetime Achievement Award.

== Life ==
He is the son of Argentinian-born bullfighter Raúl Acha, "Rovira", who frequently appeared in the Plaza de Acho in Lima, Peru. Emmanuel grew up in Chosica, a town about an hour from Lima, and attended the Colegio Santa Rosa, the town's most prestigious boarding school, which was run by Augustinian priests. His mother was Spanish singer Conchita Martínez.

Emmanuel's songs are usually ballads, which became popular during the 1980s. His fourth and most successful album to date, Íntimamente (Intimately), was written by the Spaniard ballad composer Manuel Alejandro in collaboration with Ana Magdalena. Released in 1980, it included seven hit songs:

- "Todo Se Derrumbó Dentro De Mí" ("Everything Crumbled Inside Me")
- "Quiero Dormir Cansado" ("I Want to Sleep Tired")
- "El Día Que Puedas" ("The Day You Can")
- "Con Olor A Hierba" ("With the Smell of Grass")
- "Tengo Mucho Que Aprender De Ti" ("I Have A Lot to Learn from You")
- "Insoportablemente Bella" ("Unbearably Beautiful") (cover of Hernaldo Zúñiga's and Rudy Márquez's 1980 hit)
- "Este Terco Corazón" ("This Stubborn Heart")

The remaining songs on the album are "Esa Triste Guitarra" ("That Sad Guitar"), "Caprichosa María" ("Capricious Maria"), and "Eso Era La Vida" ("That Was Life"), the last of which was not composed by Alejandro and Magdalena.

His subsequent albums also achieved success with love songs. His Ibero-American number one single "La Chica de Humo" ("The Smoke Girl"), a New jack swing song, became one of the biggest hits of 1989 and a number one single on the U.S Hot Latin Tracks chart that year. The song was included on the 1989 album Quisiera. Its music video was frequently played on Mexican, Uruguayan, and Argentinian music channels, and the song became an eighties classic in Ibero-America. In 2011, Emmanuel received the Billboard Latin Music Lifetime Achievement Award. Ten years later, he was presented with the Latin Grammy Lifetime Achievement Award. He was also presented with the Billboard Spirit of Hope Award in 1997 for his philanthropic work.

Emmanuel continues to tour throughout Latin America with bands that have included musicians from the United States, most notably guitarist Dick Smith of (Earth Wind & Fire, Kenny Loggins, and Air Supply).

Emmanuel's son, Alexander Acha, is also a professional singer.

== Discography ==
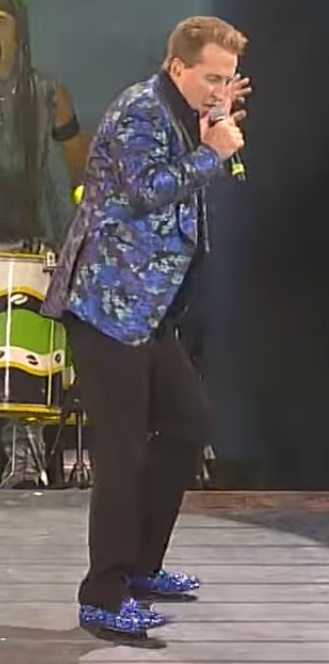

- 2019: Navidad
- 2017: Con el Alma Desnuda: MTV Unplugged
- 2015: Inédito
- 2007: Retro en Vivo
- 1999: Sentirme Vivo
- 1996: Amor Total
- 1994: Esta Aventura
- 1993: En Gira
- 1992: Ese Soy Yo
- 1990: Vida
- 1989: Quisiera
- 1988: Entre Lunas
- 1986: Desnudo
- 1984: Emmanuel
- 1983: En La Soledad
- 1982: Tú y Yo
- 1980: Intimamente
- 1979: Al Final
- 1977: Amor Sin Final
- 1976: 10 Razones Para Cantar

=== Billboard charts ===
- "Toda la Vida" (#1)
- "Es Mi Mujer" (#1)
- "La Chica de Humo" (#1)
- "La Última Luna" (#2)
- "Bella Señora" (#2)
- "No He Podido Verte" (#2)
- "Qué Será" (#3)
- "Amor Total" (#3)
- "La Vida Decidió" (#5)
- "Ese Soy Yo" (#5)
- "Magdalena" (#5)
- "Sentirme Vivo" (#5)
- "No Te Quites la Ropa" (#6)
- "Quisiera" (#7)
- "Sólo" (#8)
- "Mi Mujer" (#8)
- "En la Noche" (#10)
- "Corazón de Melao" (#12)
- "Y Ahora Se Me Pasan (Segundo a Segundo)" (#18)
- "Esta Aventura" (#27)
- "Quiero un Beso" (#30)
- "Las Barajas de Ana" (#31)
- "Una Vieja Canción" (#33)
- "Luces de Bohemia Para Elisa" (#37)

== Television ==
- 2008: Premios TV y novelas (2008)
- 2008: Emmanuel... La trayectoria
- 2008: Más vale tarde
- 2007: Premios TV y novelas (2007)
- 2006: Aún hay más... Homenaje a Raúl Velasco
- 2003: De pe a pa
- 1992: Querida Concha
- 1992: Ese soy yo
- 1987: Emmanuel en Las Vegas
- 1986: Querido amigo
- 1984: Siempre en domingo
- 1984: Emmanuel en Acapulco
- 1983: Emmanuel; si ese tiempo pudiera volver
- 1978: Festival OTI Sang "El y yo" and "Al Final"
- 1977: Variedades de media noche
- 1977: Otra vez Iran Eory

== Soundtrack ==
- 2001: La Intrusa (Mexican telenovela) TV series
- 1998: Dance with Me (film) (performer: "Esa triste guitarra")

== See also ==
- List of best-selling Latin music artists
