= 1989 in Latin music =

This is a list of notable events in Latin music (music from the Spanish- and Portuguese-speaking areas of Latin America, Latin Europe, and the United States) that took place in 1989.

== Events ==
- February 22 – The 31st Annual Grammy Awards are held at The Shrine Auditorium in Los Angeles:
  - Roberto Carlos wins the Grammy Award for Best Latin Pop Performance for his 1988 self-titled album.
  - Linda Ronstadt wins the Grammy Award for Best Mexican/Mexican-American Performance for Canciones de Mi Padre.
  - Rubén Blades wins the Grammy Award for Best Tropical Latin Performance for Antecedente.
- May 31 – The inaugural Lo Nuestro Awards is presented by American television network Univision. It is the first Spanish-language music award show to not reveal the winners before the broadcast. Spanish singer Isabel Pantoja was the biggest winner of the night, winning Pop Album of the Year for Desde Andalucía, also taking home the award for Pop Female Artist of the Year. Mexican band Los Bukis and Puerto Rican singer Lalo Rodríguez tie for the most awards with three wins.

== Number-ones albums and singles by country ==
- List of number-one albums of 1989 (Spain)
- List of number-one singles of 1989 (Spain)
- List of number-one Billboard Latin Pop Albums of 1989
- List of number-one Billboard Regional Mexican Albums of 1989
- List of number-one Billboard Tropical Albums of 1989
- List of number-one Billboard Top Latin Songs of 1989

== Awards ==
- 1989 Premio Lo Nuestro
- 1989 Tejano Music Awards

== Albums released ==
=== First-quarter ===
==== February ====
Day	Title	Artist	Genre(s)	Singles	Label
6	Suspiros	Dyango			Capitol/EMI

=== Second-quarter ===
==== May ====
Day	Title	Artist	Genre(s)	Singles	Label
15	Esos Hombres	Vikki Carr	Ballad, Latin Pop		Discos CBS International

=== Third-quarter ===
==== July ====
Day	Title	Artist	Genre(s)	Singles	Label
20	Una Prueba de Amor	Suzy Gonzalez	Ranchera		WEA Latina
20	Palabras de Amor	Pupy Santiago	Salsa		Discos CBS International
20	Pensando en ti	Sergio Hernández	Merengue, Salsa		RCA International

==== September ====
Day	Title	Artist	Genre(s)	Singles	Label
16	Selena	Selena	Tejano, Cumbia, Latin Pop		Capitol/EMI Latin

=== Fourth-quarter ===
==== October ====
Day	Title	Artist	Genre(s)	Singles	Label
16	Selena	Selena	Tejano, Cumbia, Latin Pop		Capitol/EMI Latin
23	Para los arqueólogos del futuro	Congreso	Folk Rock, Art Rock		Alerce
26	As Quatro Estações	Legião Urbana	Pop rock, Alternative Rock, New Wave, Post-Punk		EMI, EMI

==== November ====
Day	Title	Artist	Genre(s)	Singles	Label
Unknown Day	Night Gold	Johnny Ray and Ray Sepúlveda	Bolero, Salsa, Guaguanco		Mercury, PolyGram Latino

==== December ====
Day	Title	Artist	Genre(s)	Singles	Label
12	Quiero Amanecer con Alguien	Daniela Romo	Ballad		Capitol/EMI Latin
28	Chayanne (1989)	Chayanne	Salsa, Ballad		CBS
28	Acuarela del Caribe	Willy Chirino	Salsa, Guaguanco, Merengue, Bolero	"Pobre Diabla" "Un Artista Famoso" "Yo Soy un Barco"	CBS Discos International, CBS, Discos CBS International
28	Solo	Hansel Y la Orquesta Calle Ocho	Salsa		Discos CBS International

=== Dates unknown ===
Title	Artist	Genre(s)	Singles	Label
El Señor del Merengue	Johnny Ventura	Merengue		CBS
Si Vuelvo a Nacer	Johnny Ventura	Merengue		Discos CBS International
Pecado Original	Ana Gabriel	Ballad, Romantic, Vocal		Discos CBS International
No Te Quites la Ropa	Pedro Conga	Salsa		Musical Productions
Siempre Te Amaré	Los Yonic's	Conjunto, Cumbia, Ballad		Fonovisa, Inc.
El Caballito	Fito Olivares & su Grupo			
El Cuatrero	Vicente Fernández	Ranchera, Norteno		Discos CBS International
El Amiguito	Jochy Hernández	Merengue		Discos CBS International
Sólo Se Que Fue en Marzo	Jossie Esteban y la Patrulla 15	Merengue		Top Ten Hits
Sergio Vargas (1989)	Sergio Vargas	Merengue		Discos CBS International
Sensualmente Tropical	Max Torres	Salsa		EMI
El Original y El Unico	Willie González	Salsa		Musical Productions
Te Voy a Esperar	Yolanda del Río			Laser
¿Qué Es el Amor?	José José	Ballad		Ariola
Sonrie	Roberto Carlos			Discos CBS International
Ojalá Que Llueva Café	Juan Luis Guerra & 4.40			
Raíces	Julio Iglesias	Disco, Easy Listening		Discos CBS International
Amame	El Gran Combo de Puerto Rico	Salsa		Combo Records
Y Para Siempre	Los Bukis	Ballad		Fonovisa
Más Grande Que Nunca	Frankie Ruiz	Salsa		TH-Rodven, TH-Rodven
A Todo Galope	Bronco	Cumbia, Norteno		Fonovisa
¿Qué Hago Aquí?	Gloria Trevi	Pop rock		BMG U.S. Latin
Se Me Enamora el Alma	Isabel Pantoja	Flamenco		RCA
Triunfo Solido	Los Tigres del Norte	Norteño		Munivisa
Un Hombre Discreto	Mijares	Ballad, Vocal		Capitol/EMI Latin
World Beat	Kaoma	Lambada, Samba, Batucada		Epic, Epic
Maravilloso Corazon	Raphael	Vocal, Ballad		CBS
Punto de partida	Rocío Jurado			Capitol/EMI Latin
Marisela	Marisela	Ballad, Vocal, Latin		Ariola
No Te Olvidaré	Mazz	Tejano, Conjunto, Cumbia		Capitol/EMI Latin
Canciones a Mi Pueblo	Juan Valentín	Ranchera		Capitol/EMI Latin
La Rama Del Mezquite	Ramón Ayala	Norteño		Freddie Records
No Cantan Mal Las Rancheras	Los Caminantes			Luna International
The Outlaw	Ram Herrera	Tejano		Discos CBS International
Emilio Navaira & The Rio Band	Emilio Navaira & The Rio Band			
Tristes Recuerdos	Ramón Ayala			
Por Tu Maldito Amor	Vicente Fernández			Discos CBS International
La Negra Catalina	Fito Olivares y su Grupo	Cumbia, Charanga		Gil Records
Breaking The Rules	Latin Breed	Tejano		Discos CBS International
Arboles De La Barranca	Juan Valentín	Mariachi		Discos CBS International
New Wave Salsa	Eddie Santiago	Salsa		TH-Rodven
Pochy y su Cocoband	Pochy y su Cocoband			
Fuera de Serie	Los Hermanos Rosario	Merengue		Karen Records
Celebrando Con La Sonora Matancera 65 Aniversario	Sonora Matancera	Merengue, Cha-Cha, Rumba, Son, Afro-Cuban, Beguine, Mambo, Salsa, Bolero		TH-Rodven
Puerto Rico 2013	Frank Ferrer	Salsa, Latin Jazz, Cha-Cha		Tele Cumbre, Tele Cumbre
Mi Mundo	Luis Enrique	Salsa, Vocal	"Solo" "Mi Mundo" "Lo Que Paso Entre Tu y Yo...Paso"	Discos CBS International
El Original de Puerto Rico	La Solución	Salsa		TH-Rodven, TH-Rodven
Salsa Fever	Julio Gunda Merced	Salsa		MP Productions, Inc.
Sueño	Eddie Palmieri	Salsa, Latin Jazz		Intuition Records
Amanecer	Peter Ruvalcaba			
Fuerza De Gravedad	Ednita Nazario	Ballad, Vocal		Fonovisa
A Tu Recuerdo	Los Yonic's	Conjunto, Ranchera		Fonovisa
Oro Puro	Los Invasores de Nuevo León	Norteno, Ranchera, Bolero		Fonovisa, Fonovisa
Explosivo	La Mafia			
Salsa en Movimiento	Gilberto Santa Rosa	Salsa		Combo Records
Los Corridos Prohibidos	Los Tigres del Norte	Corrido		Fonovisa Records
Õ Blésq Blom	Titãs	Pop rock		WEA
II	Kraken	Heavy Metal		Codiscos
D.J. Marlboro apresenta Funk Brasil	DJ Marlboro	Bass Music, Favela Funk		Polydor
20 Éxitos	Tatico Henríquez	Merengue		Bachata
La muerte... Un compromiso de todos	La Pestilencia	Hardcore, Punk		Mort-Discos
Veneno en la Piel	Radio Futura	Pop rock		Ariola, Ariola
La Fiera	Rigo Tovar	Cumbia, Rock		Fonovisa Records

== Best-selling records ==
=== Best-selling albums ===
The following is a list of the top 5 best-selling Latin albums of 1990 in the United States divided into the categories of Latin pop, Regional Mexican, and Tropical/salsa, according to Billboard.

Category	Rank	Album	Artist
Latin pop	1	Desde Andalucía	Isabel Pantoja
Latin pop	2	Roberto Carlos	Roberto Carlos
Latin pop	3	Como Tu Mujer	Rocío Dúrcal
Latin pop	4	Con Todos Mis Sentidos	Braulio
Latin pop	5	Raíces	Julio Iglesias
Regional Mexican	1	Un Golpe Más	Bronco
Regional Mexican	2	Siempre Te Amaré	Los Yonics
Regional Mexican	3	Los Corridos Prohibidos	Los Tigres del Norte
Regional Mexican	4	Incontenible... Romanticos..!	Los Caminantes
Regional Mexican	5	Mascarada	Joan Sebastian
Tropical/Salsa	1	Invasión de la Privacidad	Eddie Santiago
Tropical/Salsa	2	Amor y Alegría	Luis Enrique
Tropical/Salsa	3	Un Nuevo Despertar	Lalo Rodríguez
Tropical/Salsa	4	Amame	El Gran Combo de Puerto Rico
Tropical/Salsa	5	Solo Que Se Fué en Marzo	La Patrulla 15

=== Best-performing songs ===
The following is a list of the top 10 best-performing Latin songs in the United States in 1990, according to Billboard.

Rank	Single	Artist
1	"Como Tu Mujer"	Rocío Dúrcal
2	"Baila Mi Rumba"	José Luis Rodríguez "El Puma"
3	"La Incondicional"	Luis Miguel
4	"Como Tú"	José José
5	"Así Fue"	Isabel Pantoja
6	"Simplemente Amigos"	Ana Gabriel
7	"Mala Suerte"	Vikki Carr
8	"Te Amo"	Franco De Vita
9	"Hombres al Borde de un Ataque de Celos"	Yuri
10	"A Donde Vayas"	Los Bukis

== Births ==
- May 11 – Prince Royce, American bachata singer
- May 31 – Pablo Alborán, Spanish pop singer
- September 3 – Gusttavo Lima, Brazilian sertanejo singer
- October 5 – Gerardo Ortíz, Mexican banda singer

== Deaths ==
- July 5 – Ernesto Halffter, Spanish composer and conductor, 84Ernesto Halffter
- September 14 – Perez Prado, Cuban bandleader and composer, 72
