= List of number-one albums of 1986 (Spain) =

The List of number-one albums of 1986 in Spain is derived from the Top 100 España record chart published weekly by PROMUSICAE (Productores de Música de España), a non-profit organization composed by Spain and multinational record companies. This association tracks record sales (physical and digital) in Spain.

== Albums ==
Week	Chart Date	Album	Artist
1	January 6	El Sur También Existe	Joan Manuel Serrat
2	January 13	Marinero de Luces	Isabel Pantoja
3	January 20	Marinero de Luces	Isabel Pantoja
4	January 27	Marinero de Luces	Isabel Pantoja
5	February 3	Marinero de Luces	Isabel Pantoja
6	February 10	Promise	Sade
7	February 17	Promise	Sade
8	February 24	Promise	Sade
9	March 3	Promise	Sade
10	March 10	Promise	Sade
11	March 17	Brothers in Arms	Dire Straits
12	March 24	Brothers in Arms	Dire Straits
13	March 31	Paloma brava	Rocío Jurado
14	April 7	Jennifer Rush	Jennifer Rush
15	April 14	Jennifer Rush	Jennifer Rush
16	April 21	Jennifer Rush	Jennifer Rush
17	April 28	Jennifer Rush	Jennifer Rush
18	May 5	Jennifer Rush	Jennifer Rush
19	May 12	Jennifer Rush	Jennifer Rush
20	May 19	Jennifer Rush	Jennifer Rush
21	May 26	Jennifer Rush	Jennifer Rush
22	June 2	Jennifer Rush	Jennifer Rush
23	June 9	Para la ternura siempre hay tiempo	Víctor Manuel y Ana Belén
24	June 16	Para la ternura siempre hay tiempo	Víctor Manuel y Ana Belén
25	June 23	Para la ternura siempre hay tiempo	Víctor Manuel y Ana Belén
26	June 30	Para la ternura siempre hay tiempo	Víctor Manuel y Ana Belén
27	July 7	Para la ternura siempre hay tiempo	Víctor Manuel y Ana Belén
28	July 14	La cagaste... Burt Lancaster	Hombres G
29	July 21	La cagaste... Burt Lancaster	Hombres G
30	July 28	Para la ternura siempre hay tiempo	Víctor Manuel y Ana Belén
31	August 4	Para la ternura siempre hay tiempo	Víctor Manuel y Ana Belén
32	August 11	Para la ternura siempre hay tiempo	Víctor Manuel y Ana Belén
33	August 18	Para la ternura siempre hay tiempo	Víctor Manuel y Ana Belén
34	August 25	Para la ternura siempre hay tiempo	Víctor Manuel y Ana Belén
35	September 1	Para la ternura siempre hay tiempo	Víctor Manuel y Ana Belén
36	September 8	Para la ternura siempre hay tiempo	Víctor Manuel y Ana Belén
37	September 15	Para la ternura siempre hay tiempo	Víctor Manuel y Ana Belén
38	September 22	Para la ternura siempre hay tiempo	Víctor Manuel y Ana Belén
39	September 29	Para la ternura siempre hay tiempo	Víctor Manuel y Ana Belén
40	October 6	Para la ternura siempre hay tiempo	Víctor Manuel y Ana Belén
41	October 13	Para la ternura siempre hay tiempo	Víctor Manuel y Ana Belén
42	October 20	Para la ternura siempre hay tiempo	Víctor Manuel y Ana Belén
43	October 27	Para la ternura siempre hay tiempo	Víctor Manuel y Ana Belén
44	November 3	Para la ternura siempre hay tiempo	Víctor Manuel y Ana Belén
45	November 10	True Blue	Madonna
46	November 17	Break Every Rule	Tina Turner
47	November 24	Break Every Rule	Tina Turner
48	December 1	Break Every Rule	Tina Turner
49	December 8	Con el paso del tiempo	José Luis Perales
50	December 15	Max Mix 4	Varios Intérpretes
51	December 22	Max Mix 4	Varios Intérpretes
52	December 29	Capriccio Russo	Luis Cobos

== See also ==
- List of number-one singles of 1986 (Spain)
