= Siempre Contigo (José José album) =

Studio album by José José
- Released: September 30, 1986
- Recorded: 1986
- Studio: Kirios Studios (Madrid, Spain)
- Genre: Latin pop · latin ballad (80's)
- Length: 31:35
- Label: RCA Ariola
- Producer: Paco Cepero

José José chronology
Promesas (1985)	Siempre Contigo (1986)	Soy Así (1987)

Professional ratings
Review scores
Source	Rating
AllMusic	3/5 stars

Siempre Contigo (English: Always with You) is 22nd studio album recorded by Mexican performer José José, It was released by RCA Ariola in late 1986. It was produced by Spanish producer and guitarist Paco Cepero. This album became the third number-one set on the Billboard Latin Pop Albums by the artist and at the Grammy Awards of 1988 was nominated for Best Latin Pop Performance, losing to Un hombre solo by Julio Iglesias.

In this production, José José ventures into the "Tango" genre with the song "Marionetas del Destino".

== Track listing ==
No.	Title	Writer(s)	Length
1.	"Corre y Ve con Él"	Paco Cepero	3:14
2.	"Dos Amores"	Paco Cepero · Juan G. García Escobar	2:09
3.	"¿Y Quién Puede Ser?"	Paco Cepero · F.M. Moncada	3:42
4.	"Por Estar Contigo"	Paco Cepero · J. Bautista	2:50
5.	"Por Tí, Me Muero"	Paco Cepero	4:01
6.	"Él Es Tu Hombre"	Paco Cepero	3:00
7.	"Sin Saber"	J. Bautista · Paco Cepero	3:09
8.	"Cuando un Amor Se Muere"	Paco Cepero · J. G. García Escobar	4:02
9.	"Marionetas del Destino"	Paco Cepero · J. G. García Escobar	2:26
10.	"Vuelve a Ser Tú"	Paco Cepero · F.M. Moncada	3:11

== Credits and personnel ==
- Paco Cepero – Producer
- Miguel Ángel Varona – Arranger

== Chart performance ==
Chart (1986/1987)	Peak position
U.S. Billboard Latin Pop Albums	1

== See also ==
- List of Billboard Latin Pop Albums number ones from the 1980s
