= Amor libre =

Amor libre (Spanish: "Free love") may refer to:

- Amor Libre (1969 film), a 1969 Argentine romantic comedy film
- Amor Libre (1979 film), a 1979 Mexican drama film
- Amor Libre: 12 Grandes Exitos, a greatest hits album by Spanish artist Camilo Sesto
- "Amor Libre", hit song by Rigo Tovar
