= ¿Y Quién Puede Ser? =

Single by José José

from the album Siempre Contigo
- Released: 1986
- Recorded: 1985–1986; Kirios Studios (Madrid, Spain)
- Length: 3:41
- Label: RCA Ariola
- Songwriter: Paco Cepero · F.M. Moncada
- Producer: Paco Cepero

José José singles chronology
"Pruébame" (1986)	"¿Y Quién Puede Ser?" (1986)	"Corre y Ve Con Él" (1987)

"¿Y Quién Puede Ser?" ("Who Could it Be?") is a song written and produced by Paco Cepero, co-written by F.M. Moncada, and performed by Mexican singer José José. It was released in 1986 as the first single from his 22nd studio album Siempre Contigo (1986). It peaked at number-one in the Billboard Hot Latin Tracks chart on November 22, 1986, being the fourth song to do so, replacing "Toda La Vida" by Cuban performer Franco. This song has been covered by Grupo Mojado, Manuel, Trailer de Penita and Sabrosos del Merengue. As part of the Latin Grammy tribute to José José in 2008, Puerto Rican singer Olga Tañón performed the song live in merengue.

== Chart performance ==
Chart (1986)	Peak position
US Billboard Hot Latin Tracks	1
