= List of number-one albums of 1989 (Spain) =

The List of number-one albums of 1989 in Spain is derived from the Top 100 España record chart published weekly by PROMUSICAE (Productores de Música de España), a non-profit organization composed by Spain and multinational record companies. This association tracks record sales (physical and digital) in Spain.

== Albums ==
Week	Chart Date	Album	Artist
1	January 2	Boom 4	Varios Artistas
2	January 9	Vienna Concerto	Luis Cobos
3	January 16	Descanso Dominical	Mecano
4	January 23	Descanso Dominical	Mecano
5	January 30	Descanso Dominical	Mecano
6	February 6	Descanso Dominical	Mecano
7	February 13	Descanso Dominical	Mecano
8	February 20	Descanso Dominical	Mecano
9	February 27	Descanso Dominical	Mecano
10	March 6	El Beso de la Luna	María del Monte
11	March 13	El Beso de la Luna	María del Monte
12	March 20	Like a Prayer	Madonna
13	March 27	Like a Prayer	Madonna
14	April 3	Like a Prayer	Madonna
15	April 10	Like a Prayer	Madonna
16	April 17	Like a Prayer	Madonna
17	April 24	Like a Prayer	Madonna
18	May 1	Like a Prayer	Madonna
19	May 8	Raíces	Julio Iglesias
20	May 15	Raíces	Julio Iglesias
21	May 22	Raíces	Julio Iglesias
22	May 29	Raíces	Julio Iglesias
23	June 5	Raíces	Julio Iglesias
24	June 12	Raíces	Julio Iglesias
25	June 19	Raíces	Julio Iglesias
26	June 26	Raíces	Julio Iglesias
27	July 3	Raíces	Julio Iglesias
28	July 10	Raíces	Julio Iglesias
29	July 17	Raíces	Julio Iglesias
30	July 24	Raíces	Julio Iglesias
31	July 31	Raíces	Julio Iglesias
32	August 7	Raíces	Julio Iglesias
33	August 14	Raíces	Julio Iglesias
34	August 21	Raíces	Julio Iglesias
35	August 28	Raíces	Julio Iglesias
36	September 4	Raíces	Julio Iglesias
37	September 11	Worldbeat	Kaoma
38	September 18	Worldbeat	Kaoma
39	September 25	Worldbeat	Kaoma
40	October 2	Worldbeat	Kaoma
41	October 9	Worldbeat	Kaoma
42	October 16	Worldbeat	Kaoma
43	October 23	Worldbeat	Kaoma
44	October 30	Worldbeat	Kaoma
45	November 6	Tutto Pavarotti	Luciano Pavarotti
46	November 13	Tutto Pavarotti	Luciano Pavarotti
47	November 20	Tutto Pavarotti	Luciano Pavarotti
48	November 27	Tutto Pavarotti	Luciano Pavarotti
49	December 4	Tutto Pavarotti	Luciano Pavarotti
50	December 11	...But Seriously	Phil Collins
51	December 18	...But Seriously	Phil Collins
52	December 25	...But Seriously	Phil Collins

== See also ==
- List of number-one singles of 1989 (Spain)
