= Paloma brava =

Paloma brava may refer to:

- Paloma brava (album), a 1986 album by Rocío Jurado
- Paloma brava (film), a 1961 Mexican film by Rogelio A. González

== See also ==
- Rock pigeon or paloma bravía
