= Libra (Julio Iglesias album) =

Studio album by Julio Iglesias
- Released: 1985
- Genre: Pop Latin
- Length: 37:22
- Languages: Spanish; English; Portuguese
- Label: CBS Discos
- Producer: Ramon Arcusa

Julio Iglesias chronology
| 1100 Bel Air Place (1984) | Libra (1985) | Un hombre solo (1987) |

Professional ratings
Review scores
| Source | Rating |
|---|---|
| Allmusic | 3/5 stars |

Libra (Pound) is a Julio Iglesias album released in 1985. The album was his first to reach number-one on the Latin Pop Album charts. Around this time, Iglesias returned to his roots, singing in his native Spanish again, although it had one English-language track, his version of Cole Porter's legendary classic "I've Got You Under My Skin". It was released as a single, and became a minor hit around Europe.

== Track listing ==
| No. | Title | Writer(s) | Length |
|---|---|---|---|
| 1. | "Ni Te Tengo, Ni Te Olvido" | (Luis Gardey) | 4:02 |
| 2. | "Tú y Yo" | (Danny Daniel, Julio Iglesias) | 3:43 |
| 3. | "I've Got You Under My Skin" | Cole Porter | 4:02 |
| 4. | "Diré" | (Daniel) | 3:46 |
| 5. | "Abril en Portugal (Coimbra)" | (Raul Ferrao, Jose Galhardo, Iglesias) | 3:08 |
| 6. | "Felicidades" | (Ray Girado) | 3:44 |
| 7. | "Esta Cobardía" | (Paco Cepero, F.M. Moncada) | 3:11 |
| 8. | "Coração Apaixonado" | (Fernando Adour, Ricardo Magno) | 5:02 |
| 9. | "Ni Tu Gato Gris, Ni Tu Perro Fiel" | (Daniel, Rafael Ferro) | 3:08 |
| 10. | "Todo y Nada" | (Iglesias, Ferro, Adour, Ramón Arcusa) | 3:37 |

== Charts ==
=== Weekly charts ===
Weekly chart performance for Libra
| Chart (1985) | Peak position |
|---|---|
| Argentine Albums (CAPIF) | 4 |
| Australian Albums (Kent Music Report) | 23 |
| Austrian Albums (Ö3 Austria) | 22 |
| European Albums (Music & Media) | 23 |
| German Albums (Offizielle Top 100) | 26 |
| Japanese Albums (Oricon) | 31 |
| Dutch Albums (Album Top 100) | 15 |
| Spanish Albums (AFYVE) | 1 |
| Swedish Albums (Sverigetopplistan) | 24 |
| UK Albums (Official Charts) | 61 |
| US Billboard 200 | 92 |
| US Latin Pop Albums (Billboard) | 1 |

=== Year-end charts ===
Year-end chart performance for Libra
| Chart (1985) | Position |
|---|---|
| Brazilian Albums (Nopem) | 40 |
| Spanish Albums (AFYVE) | 10 |

| Chart (1986) | Position |
|---|---|
| Brazilian Albums (Nopem) | 7 |
| US Latin Pop Albums (Billboard) | 2 |

== Certifications ==
| Region | Certification | Certified units/sales |
|---|---|---|
| Argentina (CAPIF) | 3× Platinum | 180,000^{^} |
| Australia (ARIA) | Gold | 35,000^{^} |
| Brazil (Pro-Música Brasil) | 5× Platinum | 1,250,000^{*} |
| Canada (Music Canada) | Gold | 50,000^{^} |
| Chile | Platinum | |
| Colombia | Gold | |
| Denmark (IFPI Danmark) | Gold | 50,000^{^} |
| Japan | — | 16,950 |
| Mexico (AMPROFON) | Platinum | 250,000^{^} |
| Portugal (AFP) | Platinum | 60,000 |
| Spain (Promusicae) | 3× Platinum | 300,000^{^} |
| Sweden (GLF) | Gold | 50,000^{^} |
| United States (RIAA) | 6× Platinum (Latin) | 600,000^{^} |
Summaries
| Worldwide | — | 3,000,000 |
^{*} Sales figures based on certification alone.^{^} Shipments figures based on certification alone.

== See also ==
- List of best-selling Latin albums
- List of Billboard Latin Pop Albums number ones from the 1980s
