= Starry Night (album) =

Studio album by Julio Iglesias
- Released: November 6, 1990
- Length: 37:06
- Label: CBS
- Producer: Albert Hammond

Julio Iglesias chronology
Raíces (1989)	Starry Night (1990)	Calor (1992)

Starry Night is a 1990 album by Julio Iglesias. It contains covers of popular songs from the 1950s, '60s and '70s.

== Track listing ==
No.	Title	Writer(s)	Length
1.	"Can't Help Falling in Love"	George David Weiss, Hugo Peretti, Luigi Creatore	3:21
2.	"And I Love Her"	John Lennon, Paul McCartney	3:15
3.	"Mona Lisa"	Jay Livingston, Ray Evans	3:59
4.	"Cryin' Time"	Buck Owens	3:31
5.	"Yesterday When I Was Young"	Charles Aznavour, Herbert Kretzmer	3:13
6.	"When I Need You"	Albert Hammond, Carole Bayer Sager	4:19
7.	"99 Miles from L.A."	Albert Hammond, Hal David	4:10
8.	"Vincent (Starry Starry Night)"	Don McLean	4:19
9.	"If You Go Away"	Jacques Brel, Rod McKuen	3:35
10.	"Love Has Been a Friend to Me"	Albert Hammond, John Bettis	3:24
Total length:			37:06

== Certifications and sales ==
Region	Certification	Certified units/sales
Australia (ARIA)	Platinum	70,000^{^}
Belgium (BRMA)	Gold	
Brazil (Pro-Música Brasil)	Platinum	750,000
Canada (Music Canada)	Platinum	100,000^{^}
Malaysia	Platinum	
Netherlands (NVPI)	Platinum	100,000^{^}
Singapore (RIAS)	Platinum	
Spain (Promusicae)	Platinum	100,000^{^}
South Korea (KMCA)	3× Platinum	
United Kingdom (BPI)	Gold	100,000^{^}
United States (RIAA)	Gold	500,000^{^}
United States (RIAA) DVD	Gold	50,000^{^}
^{^} Shipments figures based on certification alone.
