= Playa Limbo =

Mexican pop band

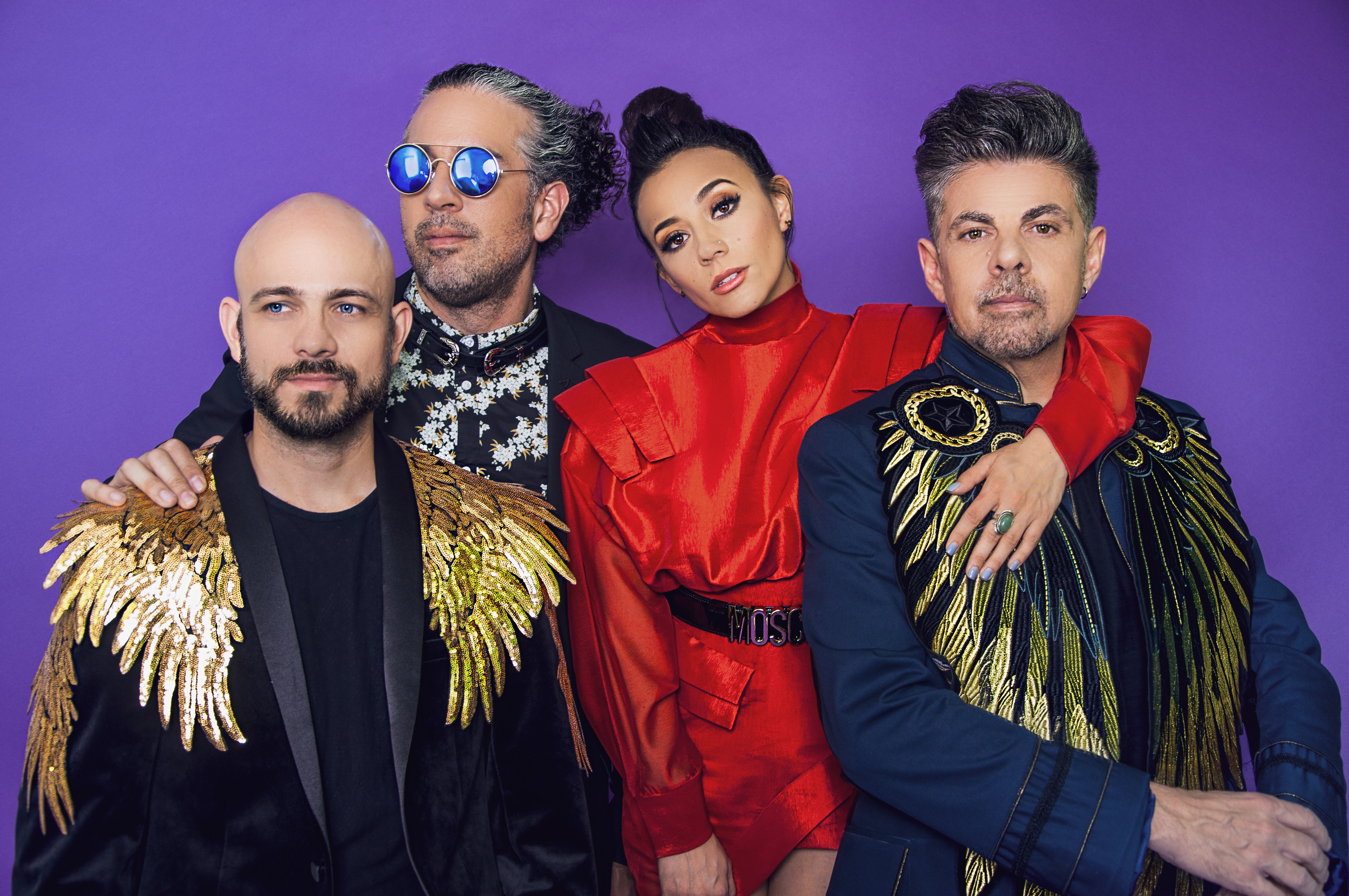

Background information
- Origin: Guadalajara, Jalisco, Mexico
- Genres: Pop rock; Latin pop; Pop
- Years active: 2006–present
- Label: Warner/Chappel Music ONErpm
- Members: Jass Reyes (Ada Jaasiel Reyes Ávila); Jorge Corrales; Ángel Baillo; Servando Yañez
- Past members: María León (Sargento Leon)

Playa Limbo (Spanish pronunciation: [ˈplaʝa ˈlimbo]) are a Mexican pop band with influences from jazz. They are originally from Guadalajara, Jalisco, Mexico.

== Biography ==
Angel Baillo (bass) and Jorge Corrales (keyboards) formed the group after playing together in a local rock band. They began as a project called Vodkatronik, experimenting with a mix of eighties music and electronic beats. They later met María León (Sargento Leon), who joined as lead vocals and guitar. They have performed in various parts of Mexico, including Querétaro, Nayarit, Leon, and Aguascalientes.

Maria Leon (Sargento Leon) left the group in 2016 to co-star US Spanish Television Series produced by Telemundo called Guerra de ídolos. Her replacement as lead singer is Jass Reyes.

== Discography ==
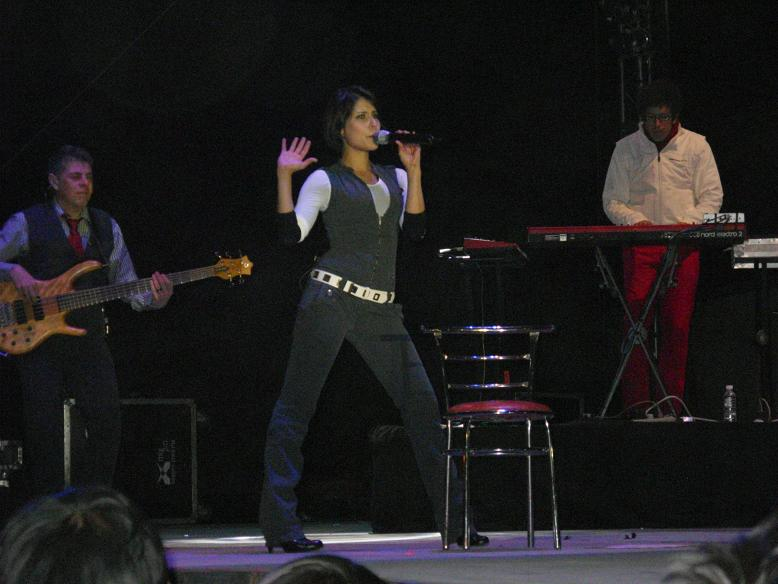
Playa Limbo 2008

- Canciones de hotel (2008)
- Año perfecto (2010)
- El tren de la vida (2012)
- De días y de noches (2014)
- Universo Amor (2020)
- Luces de Sal (2021)

=== Songs ===
- "Así Fue" (2010)
- "Qué bello" (2012)
- "A dónde va nuestro amor" - main theme of Muchacha italiana viene a casarse (2014)
- "Sola" (2016)
- "Mi Perdición" (2017)

== Awards and nominations ==
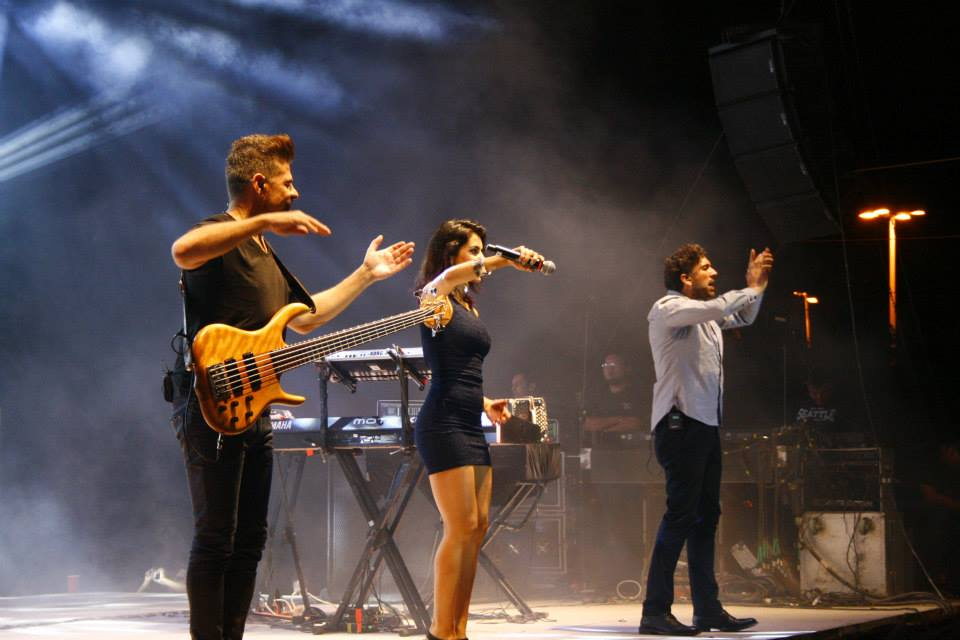
Play Limbo in 2013

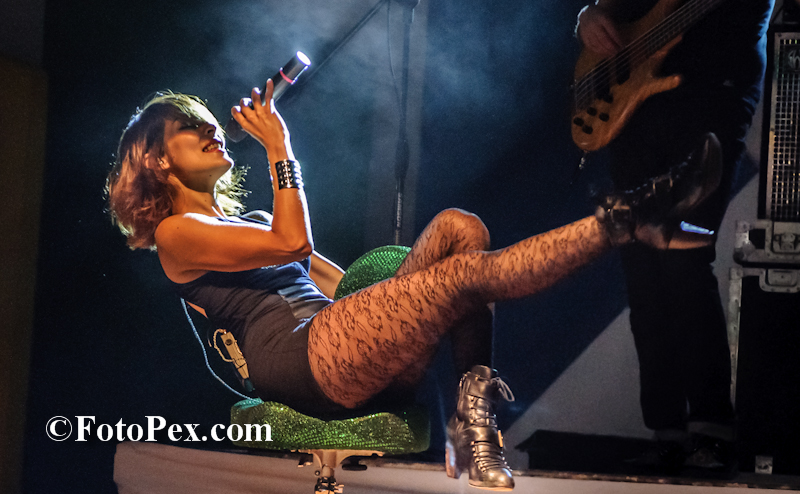
Expoferia Huajuapan 2012

Award	Year	Category	Recipients and nominees	Result	Ref.
Premio Lo Nuestro	2010	Pop Song of the Year	"Así fue"	Nominated	
Premio Lo Nuestro	2010	Pop Group or Duo of the Year	Playa Limbo	Nominated	
Premio Lo Nuestro	2011	Pop Group or Duo of the Year	Playa Limbo	Nominated	
