= Señor Corazón =

Studio album by José Luis Rodríguez "El Puma"
- Released: 1987
- Genre: Latin, Pop
- Label: CBS International
- Producer: Albert Hammond

José Luis Rodríguez "El Puma" chronology
| Voy a Conquistarte (1986) | Señor Corazón (1987) | Con el Mariachi Vargas de Tecalitlán (1988) |

Señor Corazón (Mr. Heart) is the 1987 studio album by Venezuelan performer, José Luis Rodríguez "El Puma". The album was produced by Albert Hammond and includes the number-one song "Y Tú También Llorarás". However, it went almost unnoticed in Latin America where instead the song "Sueño Contigo" became a resounding success. Señor Corazón was nominated for Pop Album of the Year at the 1st Lo Nuestro Music Awards.

== Track listing ==
1. "Sueño Contigo"
2. "Yo Quiero Ser Tu Amor"
3. "Recuerdos"
4. "Si Pudiera"
5. "Y Tu También Lloraras"
6. "Dame Dame"
7. "Dímelo"
8. "Por Esa Mujer"
9. "Señor Corazón"
10. "Quiero Cantarle A La Vida"

== Personnel ==
The following information was provided by Allmusic:

- Albert Hammond – vocals, producer, editing
- Jose Luis Rodríguez – percussion, performer
- Roberto Livi – songwriting, vocals
- Hector Maselli – creative consultant, realization
- Briant Arnet – mixing engineer
- Jim Preziosi – mixing
- Marnie Riley – mixing
- Stephen Shelton – mixing
- Gary Wagner – mixing
- Bill Jackson – engineer
- Paulinho Da Costa – percussion
- Assa Drori – strings
- Paul Jackson Jr. – guitar
- Randy Kerber – keyboards
- Abraham Laboriel – bass
- Josh Sklair – guitar
- John "J.R." Robinson – drums
- Mario Houben – graphic design, photography

== See also ==
- List of Billboard Latin Pop Albums number ones from the 1980s
