= Que No Se Rompa la Noche =

Single by Julio Iglesias

from the album Un hombre solo
- Released: 1987
- Recorded: 1986–1987
- Studio: Torresonido (Madrid, Spain)
- Genre: Latin pop · Latin ballad
- Length: 4:26
- Label: Discos CBS International
- Songwriter: Manuel Alejandro · Ana Magdalena
- Producer: Manuel Alejandro

Julio Iglesias singles chronology
"Lo Mejor de Tu Vida" (1987)	"Que No Se Rompa la Noche" (1987)	"Todo el Amor Que Te Hace Falta" (1987)

"Que No Se Rompa la Noche" (English: May the Night Have No End) literally "May the Night not Break", is a ballad written and produced by Spanish singer-songwriter Manuel Alejandro, co-written by Ana Magdalena, and performed by Spanish singer Julio Iglesias. It was released as the second single from his studio album Un hombre solo (1987). This song became his second number one hit in the Billboard Hot Latin Tracks chart, after his previous single "Lo Mejor de Tu Vida".

"Qué No Se Rompa la Noche" has been covered by several singers, including Tamara, Pandora, Ray Conniff, Vikki Carr and Raulin Rosendo.

== Background ==
"Que No Se Rompa la Noche" was released as the second single from Iglesias' Un hombre solo and became his second number-one hit in the Billboard Hot Latin Tracks, and his last on this chart as a solo artist, until "Torero", his duet with José Luis Rodríguez "El Puma" in 1992. The song is a plea for a long lasting night to express the strong passions he has towards his lover.

== Chart performance ==
The song debuted on the Billboard Hot Latin Tracks chart at number 14 on 29 August 1987, and climbed to the top of the chart twelve weeks later. It spent two weeks at number-one, replacing "Ahora Te Puedes Marchar" by Mexican performer Luis Miguel and being replaced by "Y Tú También Llorarás" by Venezuelan singer-songwriter and actor José Luis Rodríguez "El Puma". "Qué No Se Rompa la Noche" spent 29 weeks on the chart and ranked at number 16 in the Hot Latin Tracks Year-End Chart of 1988.

Chart (1987)	Peak position
U.S. Billboard Hot Latin Tracks	1

== Credits and personnel ==
This information adopted from Allmusic.

- Manuel Alejandro – producer, piano
- Assa Drori – concertina
- Rafael Ferro-García – keyboards
- Michael Fisher – percussion
- Humberto Gatica – engineer, mixer
- Julio Iglesias – vocals
- Randy Kerber – keyboards
- Abraham Laboriel – bass
- Michael Landau – guitar
- Michael Lang – keyboards
- Gayle Levant – harp
- Fernando López – guitar
- Greg Mathieson – keyboards
- Rafael Padilla – percussion
- Carlos Vega – drums
- Pepe Sánchez – drums

== Cover versions ==
"Que No Se Rompa la Noche" has been recorded by several performers, including Vikki Carr on her Grammy-nominated album Emociones (a tribute album to Manuel Alejandro and Brazilian singer-songwriter Roberto Carlos); Spanish singer Tamara also did a version of this song, and included it on her album Lo Mejor de Tu Vida which was produced by Max Pierre. Tamara's album peaked at number 8 in the Spanish Album chart. Pandora, Raulin Rosendo, Rafael Ferro, Esteban Mariano, Orquesta Noche Sabrosa and Ray Conniff also recorded their own version of the track.
