= List of Billboard Latin Pop Albums number ones from the 1980s =

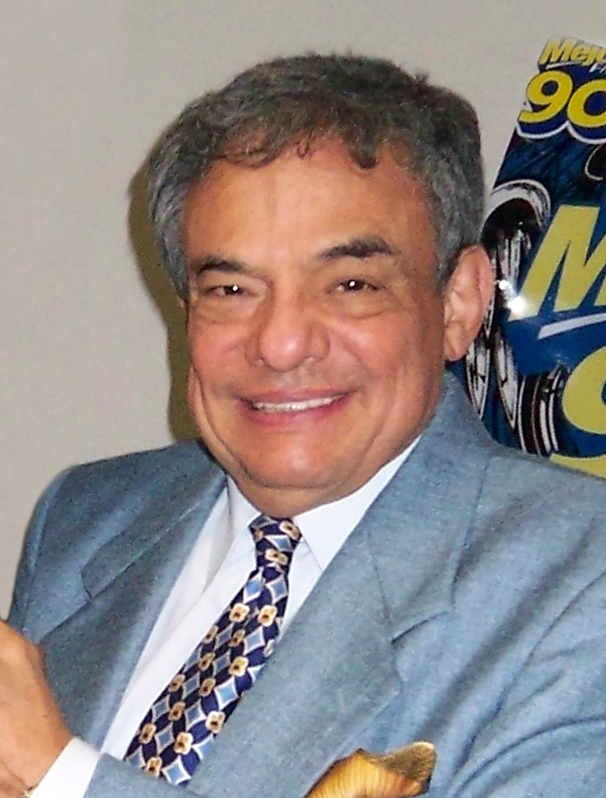
José José (pictured in 2011) was the first artist to reach number one on the Latin Pop Albums chart in 1985. He also had the most number one albums of the 1980s with a total of four albums.

In June 1985, Billboard magazine established Latin Pop Albums, a chart that ranks the best-selling Latin pop albums in the United States. The chart was published on a fortnightly basis with its positions being compiled by sales data from Latin music retailers and distributors. According to Billboard, Latin pop includes "the music known as the balada romántica or música interacional" as well as "young pop sounds" and "the new Spanish-language rock". Latin pop emerged as the most commercially successful genre of Latin music throughout the 1980s and 1990s in the US, and the popularity of the balada was propelled by artists such as Julio Iglesias, Camilo Sesto, and Gloria Estefan (lead singer of the Miami Sound Machine at the time). During the 1980s, 22 albums topped the chart.

The first album to reach number one on the Latin Pop Album chart was Reflexiones (1984) by José José. José José was also the artist with the most number-one albums of the 1980s with Promesas (1985), Siempre Contigo (1986), and Soy Así (1987). The three records were the best-selling Latin pop albums of 1986–88, respectively. Promesas was the longest-running number one with 17 weeks. The Miami Sound Machine was the only band to reach number one in the 1980s with their album Primitive Love (1985). Primitive Love spawned the crossover single, "Conga", which peaked at number ten on the Billboard Hot 100 chart.

Iglesias and Emmanuel were the only other artists to have more than two chart-toppers. Iglesias, who has been recognized as the best-selling male Latin artist of all-time by the Guinness World Records, spent a total of 29 weeks at the apex of the chart with his albums Libra (1985), Un Hombre Solo (1987), and Raíces (1989). Five female acts reached number one on the chart during the 1980s: Ángela Carrasco, Ana Gabriel, Rocío Jurado, Yolandita Monge, and Isabel Pantoja. Pantoja had the best-selling Latin pop album of 1989 with Desde Andalucía (1988) and won the Lo Nuestro Award for Pop Album of the Year in the same year. Gabriel culminated the decade with Tierra de Nadie (1988). Recognized as her breakthrough album, it won the Pop Album of the Year award at the following Lo Nuestro Awards.

== Chart history ==
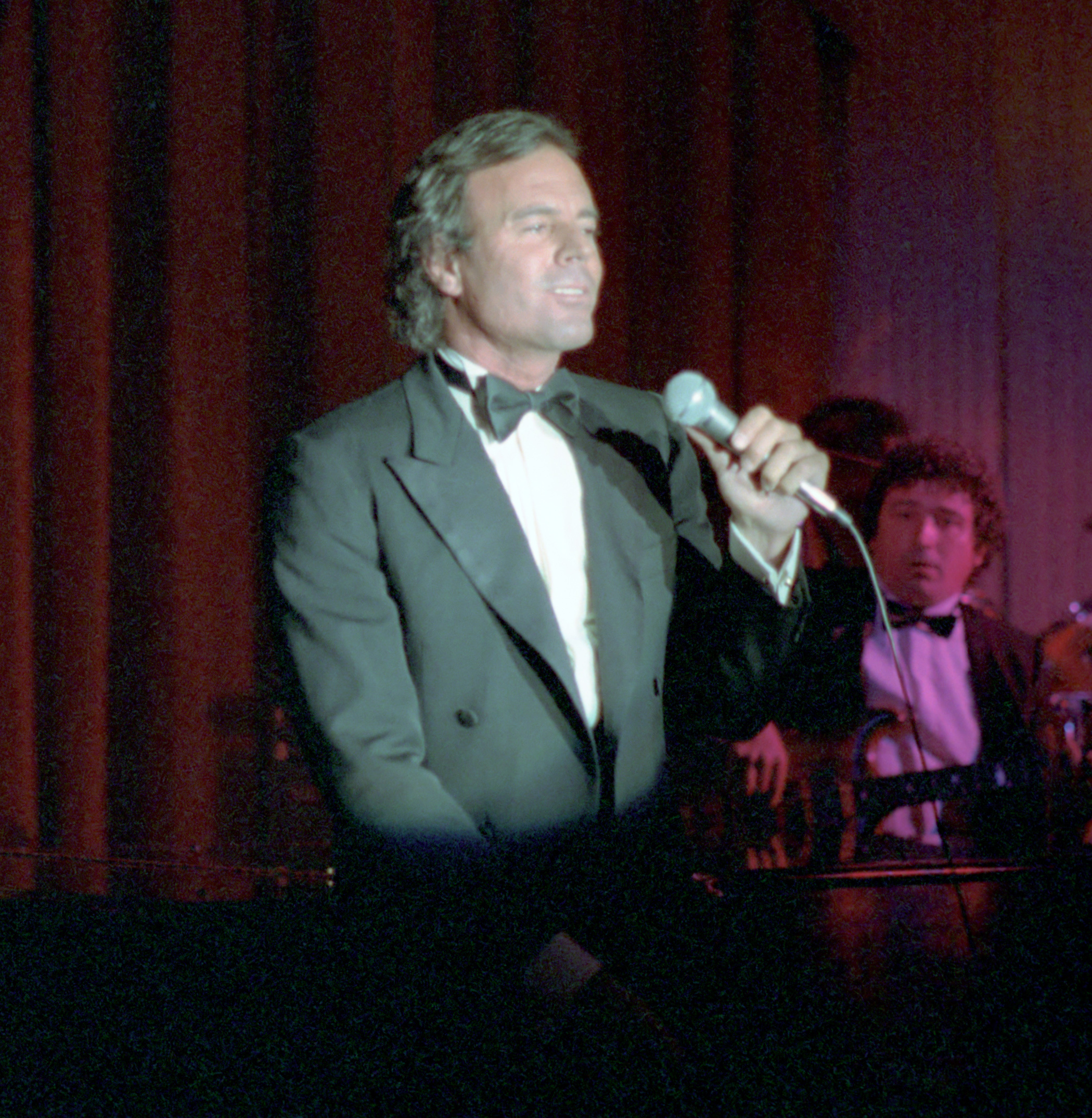
Julio Iglesias (pictured in 1984) spent a total of 29 weeks at number one with three albums.

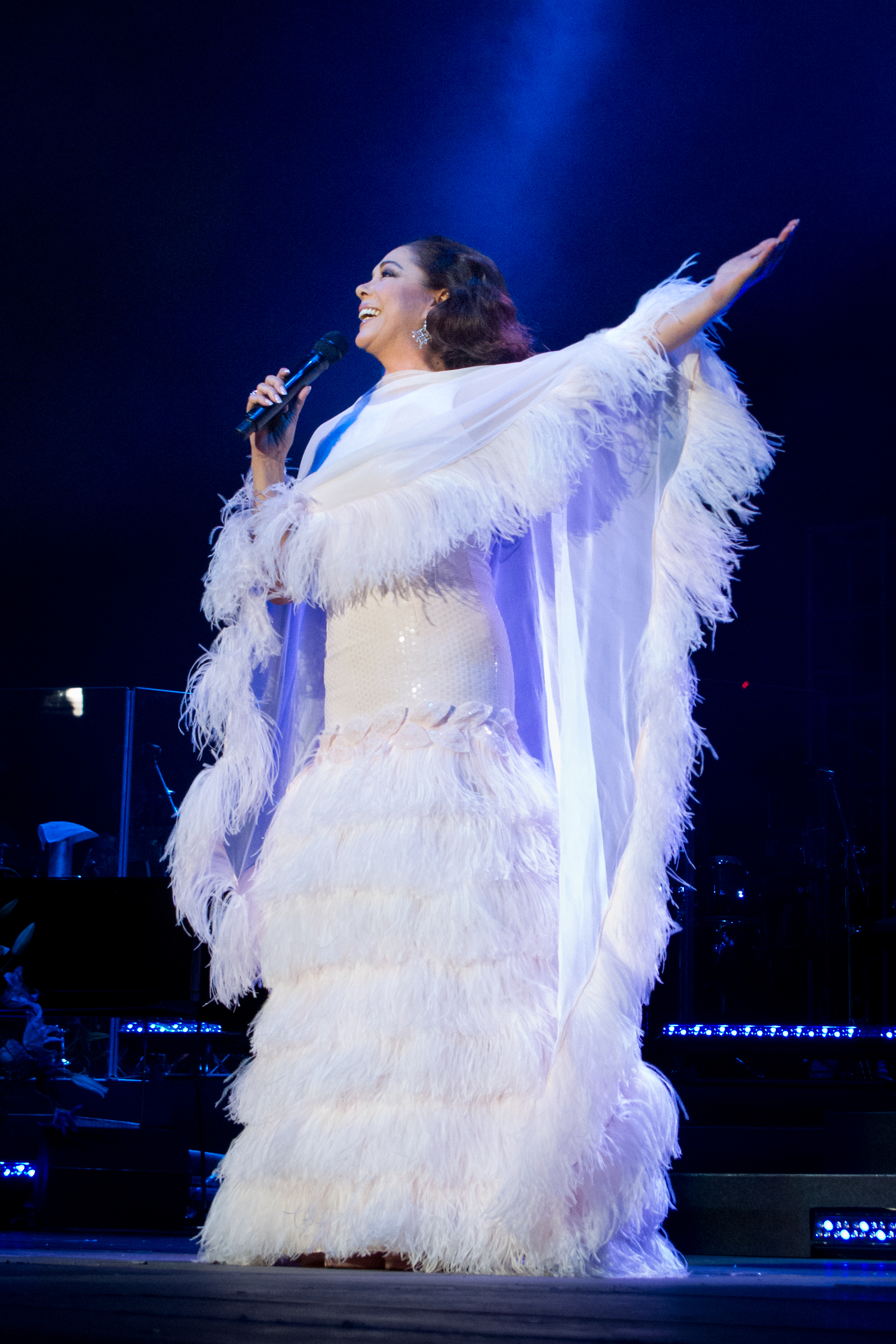
Isabel Pantoja (pictured in 2012) had the best-selling Latin pop album of 1989 with Desde Andalucía (1988).

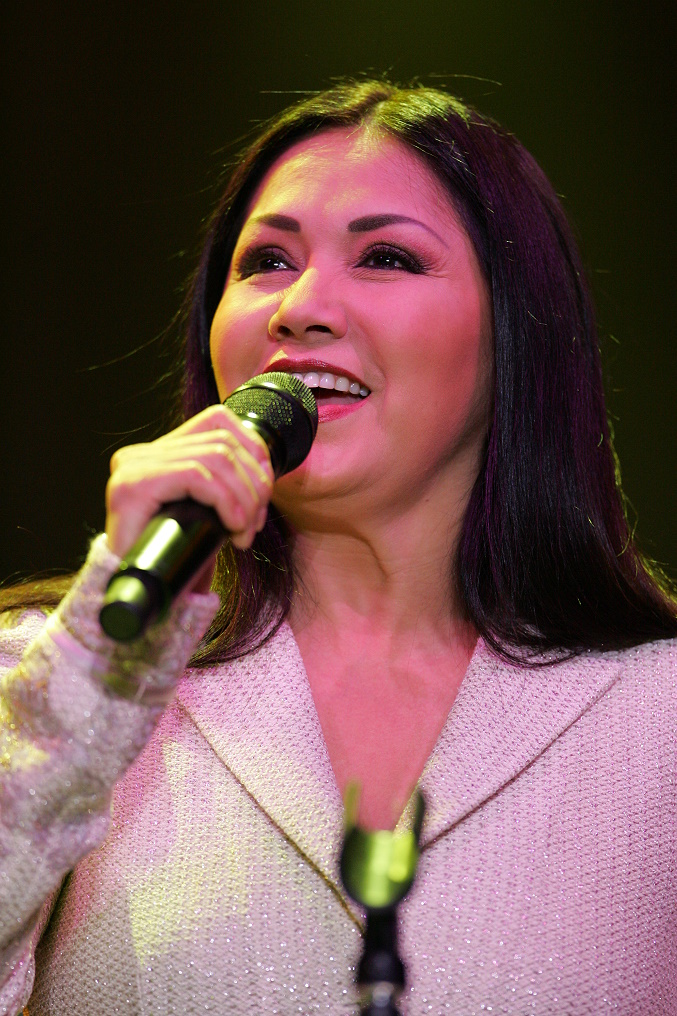
Tierra de Nadie (1988) by Ana Gabriel (pictured in 2006) was the final number one album of the 1980s.

Key
†	Indicates best-selling Latin pop album of the year

Chart history
Issue date	Album	Artist(s)	Ref.
June 29, 1985	Reflexiones	José José	
July 13, 1985	Reflexiones	José José	
July 27, 1985	Reflexiones	José José	
August 10, 1985	Reflexiones	José José	
August 24, 1985	Reflexiones	José José	
September 7, 1985	Reflexiones	José José	
September 21, 1985	Reflexiones	José José	
October 5, 1985	Reflexiones	José José	
October 19, 1985	Libra	Julio Iglesias	
November 2, 1985	Libra	Julio Iglesias	
November 16, 1985	Libra	Julio Iglesias	
November 30, 1985	Libra	Julio Iglesias	
December 14, 1985	Libra	Julio Iglesias	
December 28, 1985	Primitive Love	Miami Sound Machine	
January 11, 1986	Primitive Love	Miami Sound Machine	
January 25, 1986	Primitive Love	Miami Sound Machine	
February 8, 1986	Promesas †	José José	
February 22, 1986	Promesas †	José José	
March 8, 1986	Promesas †	José José	
March 22, 1986	Promesas †	José José	
April 5, 1986	Promesas †	José José	
April 19, 1986	Promesas †	José José	
May 3, 1986	Paloma Brava	Rocío Jurado	
May 17, 1986	Paloma Brava	Rocío Jurado	
May 31, 1986	Promesas †	José José	
June 14, 1986	Promesas †	José José	
June 28, 1986	Promesas †	José José	
July 12, 1986	Promesas †	José José	
July 26, 1986	Promesas †	José José	
August 9, 1986	Promesas †	José José	
August 23, 1986	Promesas †	José José	
September 6, 1986	Promesas †	José José	
September 20, 1986	Promesas †	José José	
October 4, 1986	Promesas †	José José	
October 18, 1986	Promesas †	José José	
November 1, 1986	Toda la Vida y Otros Grandes Exitos	Emmanuel	
November 15, 1986	Siempre Contigo †	José José	
November 29, 1986	Siempre Contigo †	José José	
December 13, 1986	Siempre Contigo †	José José	
December 27, 1986	Siempre Contigo †	José José	
January 10, 1987	Siempre Contigo †	José José	
January 24, 1987	Siempre Contigo †	José José	
February 7, 1987	Siempre Contigo †	José José	
February 21, 1987	Siempre Contigo †	José José	
March 7, 1987	Solo	Emmanuel	
March 21, 1987	Siempre Contigo †	José José	
April 4, 1987	Solo	Emmanuel	
April 18, 1987	Siempre Contigo †	José José	
May 2, 1987	Lo Bello y lo Prohibido	Braulio	
May 16, 1987	Lo Bello y lo Prohibido	Braulio	
May 30, 1987	Lo Bello y lo Prohibido	Braulio	
June 13, 1987	Un Hombre Solo	Julio Iglesias	
June 27, 1987	Un Hombre Solo	Julio Iglesias	
July 11, 1987	Un Hombre Solo	Julio Iglesias	
July 25, 1987	Un Hombre Solo	Julio Iglesias	
August 8, 1987	Un Hombre Solo	Julio Iglesias	
August 22, 1987	Un Hombre Solo	Julio Iglesias	
September 5, 1987	Un Hombre Solo	Julio Iglesias	
September 19, 1987	Un Hombre Solo	Julio Iglesias	
October 3, 1987	Un Hombre Solo	Julio Iglesias	
October 17, 1987	Un Hombre Solo	Julio Iglesias	
October 31, 1987	Un Hombre Solo	Julio Iglesias	
November 14, 1987	Un Hombre Solo	Julio Iglesias	
November 28, 1987	Un Hombre Solo	Julio Iglesias	
December 12, 1987	Un Hombre Solo	Julio Iglesias	
December 26, 1987	Un Hombre Solo	Julio Iglesias	
January 16, 1988	Soy Así †	José José	
January 30, 1988	Soy Así †	José José	
February 13, 1988	Soy Así †	José José	
February 27, 1988	Soy Así †	José José	
March 12, 1988	Soy Así †	José José	
March 26, 1988	Soy Así †	José José	
April 9, 1988	Soy Así †	José José	
April 23, 1988	Soy Así †	José José	
May 7, 1988	Soy Así †	José José	
May 21, 1988	Entre Lunas	Emmanuel	
June 4, 1988	Entre Lunas	Emmanuel	
June 18, 1988	Señor Corazón	José Luis Rodríguez	
July 2, 1988	Señor Corazón	José Luis Rodríguez	
July 16, 1988	Señor Corazón	José Luis Rodríguez	
July 30, 1988	Señor Corazón	José Luis Rodríguez	
August 13, 1988	Señor Corazón	José Luis Rodríguez	
August 27, 1988	Señor Corazón	José Luis Rodríguez	
September 10, 1988	Amor Libre: 12 Grandes Exitos	Camilo Sesto	
September 24, 1988	Amor Libre: 12 Grandes Exitos	Camilo Sesto	
October 8, 1988	Vivencias	Yolandita Monge	
October 22, 1988	Amor Libre: 12 Grandes Exitos	Camilo Sesto	
November 5, 1988	Con Todos los Sentidos	Braulio	
November 19, 1988	Vivencias	Yolandita Monge	
December 3, 1988	Boca Rosa	Ángela Carrasco	
December 17, 1988	Desde Andalucía †	Isabel Pantoja	
December 31, 1988	Desde Andalucía †	Isabel Pantoja	
January 14, 1989	Desde Andalucía †	Isabel Pantoja	
January 28, 1989	Desde Andalucía †	Isabel Pantoja	
February 11, 1989	Desde Andalucía †	Isabel Pantoja	
February 25, 1989	Desde Andalucía †	Isabel Pantoja	
March 11, 1989	Desde Andalucía †	Isabel Pantoja	
March 11, 1989	Desde Andalucía †	Isabel Pantoja	
March 25, 1989	Desde Andalucía †	Isabel Pantoja	
April 8, 1989	Ricardo Montaner	Ricardo Montaner	
April 22, 1989	Desde Andalucía †	Isabel Pantoja	
May 6, 1989	Desde Andalucía †	Isabel Pantoja	
May 20, 1989	Desde Andalucía †	Isabel Pantoja	
June 3, 1989	Roberto Carlos '88	Roberto Carlos	
June 17, 1989	Desde Andalucía †	Isabel Pantoja	
July 1, 1989	Desde Andalucía †	Isabel Pantoja	
July 15, 1989	Raíces	Julio Iglesias	
July 29, 1989	Raíces	Julio Iglesias	
August 12, 1989	Raíces	Julio Iglesias	
August 26, 1989	Raíces	Julio Iglesias	
September 9, 1989	Raíces	Julio Iglesias	
September 23, 1989	Raíces	Julio Iglesias	
October 7, 1989	Raíces	Julio Iglesias	
October 21, 1989	Raíces	Julio Iglesias	
November 4, 1989	Raíces	Julio Iglesias	
November 18, 1989	Tierra de Nadie	Ana Gabriel	
December 2, 1989	Tierra de Nadie	Ana Gabriel	
December 16, 1989	Tierra de Nadie	Ana Gabriel	
December 30, 1989	Tierra de Nadie	Ana Gabriel	

== See also ==
- 1980s in Latin music
- List of Billboard Regional Mexican Albums number ones from the 1980s
- List of Billboard Tropical Albums number ones from the 1980s
