= Toda la Vida y Otros Grandes Exitos =

Greatest hits album by Emmanuel
- Released: 1986
- Recorded: 1986
- Genre: Pop
- Label: RCA Records

Toda la Vida y Otros Grandes Exitos is a compilation album, by Mexican iconic pop singer Emmanuel. It was released in 1986. The title comes from the hit song, "Toda la Vida which reached #1 on the Hot Latin Tracks chart. The album reached #1 on the Latin Pop Albums chart for 4 weeks.

== Track listing ==
1. "Toda la Vida"
2. "Hay Que Arrimar el Alma"
3. " El Año Que Vendra... Querido Amigo"
4. "Mucho Señora"
5. "Esa Triste Guitarra"
6. "Estoy Loco"
7. "María Del Angel"
8. "Pertenezco A Tí"
9. "Sola"
10. "Detenedla Ya"
11. "Entre Cuatro Paredes"

== See also ==
- List of Billboard Latin Pop Albums number ones from the 1980s
