= Celebrando 25 Años de Juan Gabriel: En Concierto en el Palacio de Bellas Artes =

1998 live album by Juan Gabriel

Live album by Juan Gabriel
- Released: January 13, 1998
- Recorded: August 22, 1997
- Venue: Palacio de Bellas Artes (Mexico City)
- Genre: Pop Latino, Mariachi, Regional Mexican
- Language: Spanish
- Label: RCA Victor

Celebrando 25 Años de Juan Gabriel: En Concierto en el Palacio de Bellas Artes (Celebrating 25 Years of Juan Gabriel: Live from Bellas Artes) is a live album by Mexican singer-songwriter Juan Gabriel.

It was recorded on August 22, 1997, at the Palacio de Bellas Artes, in Mexico City and was released on January 13, 1998. The album was nominated for a Pop Album of the Year at the 1999 Lo Nuestro Awards.

== Track listing ==
All tracks written by Juan Gabriel.

=== Disc 1 ===
No.	Title	Length
1.	"Obertura: El Amor"	6:00
2.	"Que Buena Suerte"	3:55
3.	"Sin Dinero y Con Guitarra: Aquella Melodia"	10:00
4.	"Recordándote"	5:33
5.	"Así Fue"	7:24
6.	"Cuantos Días Más"	4:11
7.	"Queriendo y No"	4:44
8.	"Hoy Todos Mis Días"	5:48
9.	"Rumbeando Por Madrid: La Madrileña/María José/Cuando Seas Mi Mujer"	11:36
10.	"Ven a Mi Soledad"	4:44
11.	"Amor Eterno"	9:01

=== Disc 2 ===
No.	Title	Length
1.	"El Principio"	7:16
2.	"La Herencia"	4:35
3.	"Homenaje a Lola: Que Viva Lola/Cucurrucucu Paloma"	8:44
4.	"Te Sigo Amando"	3:33
5.	"Costumbres"	6:33
6.	"No Me Arrepiento de Nada"	3:45
7.	"Abuso"	5:19
8.	"Chachaseando (Pensando en Ti): Siempre en Mi Mente/Mentira"	13:37
9.	"Te Recuerdo Dulcemente"	5:04
10.	"Obertura: El Amor"	2:56

== Charts ==
Chart (1998)	Peak position
US Top Latin Albums (Billboard)	13
US Latin Pop Albums (Billboard)	7

== Sales and certifications ==
Region	Certification	Certified units/sales
Mexico (AMPROFON)	2× Platinum	500,000^{^}
Mexico (AMPROFON) DVD	Platinum	20,000^{^}
United States (RIAA)	2× Platinum (Latin)	200,000^{^}
^{^} Shipments figures based on certification alone.
