= Promesas =

Studio album by José José
- Released: October 22, 1985
- Recorded: 1985
- Studio: Sunset Sound (Hollywood, California); Record One (Studio City, California); Gramola Studios (Madrid, Spain)
- Genre: Latin pop (80's)
- Length: 31:06
- Label: RCA Ariola
- Producer: Rafael Pérez-Botija

José José chronology
Reflexiones (1984)	Promesas (1985)	Siempre Contigo (1986)

Professional ratings
Review scores
Source	Rating
Allmusic	3/5 stars

Promesas (Promises) is 21st studio album recorded by Mexican performer José José, It was released by RCA Ariola in 1985. It was written, produced and arranged by Spanish producer Rafael Pérez-Botija. This album became the second number-one set on the Billboard Latin Pop Albums by the artist and at the Grammy Awards of 1987 the single "Pruébame" was nominated for Best Latin Pop Performance, losing to "Le Lo Lai" by José Feliciano. For this album the singer received two Billboard awards: Top Latin Artist and Top Latin Album of 1985.

== Track listing ==
All tracks are written by Rafael Pérez-Botija

No.	Title	Length
1.	"Amantes"	3:07
2.	"Me Vas a Echar de Menos"	2:57
3.	"Más"	3:02
4.	"Pruébame"	3:05
5.	"Muchacho"	3:37
6.	"Sólo Tú"	3:05
7.	"Tú Me Estás Volviendo Loco"	3:03
8.	"Promesas"	3:03
9.	"Lástima"	3:01
10.	"Yo"	3:11

== Personnel ==
- Rafael Pérez Botija — Arranger, director, realization
- Tito Saavedra — Engineer
- Joel Soiffer — Engineer

== Chart performance ==
Chart (1985)	Peak position
US Billboard Latin Pop Albums	1

== See also ==
- List of Billboard Latin Pop Albums number ones from the 1980s
