= Lo Mejor de Tu Vida =

Single by Julio Iglesias

from the album Un hombre solo
- Released: 1987
- Recorded: 1986–1987
- Studio: Torres Sonido Parquelagos (Madrid, Spain); Lion Share (Los Angeles, California); Record Plant Studios (Hollywood, California); Critiera Moon Studios (Miami, Florida)
- Genre: Latin
- Length: 4:17
- Label: CBS Discos
- Songwriter: Manuel Alejandro · Marian Beigbeder
- Producer: Manuel Alejandro

Julio Iglesias singles chronology
"To All the Girls I've Loved Before" (1984)	"Lo Mejor de Tu Vida" (1987)	"Qué No Se Rompa la Noche" (1987)

"Lo Mejor de Tu Vida" ('The Best of Your Life') is a ballad written and produced by Spanish singer-songwriter Manuel Alejandro, co-written by Marian Beigbeder, and performed by Spanish singer Julio Iglesias. It was released as the first single from his studio album Un hombre solo (1987). The song became the first by a male performer to spend 13 weeks at number one in the Billboard Hot Latin Tracks chart and held the record for the biggest leap to the top of the chart for over twenty years (from 14 to 1) until Mexican rock band Maná leapt from 22 to number one with "Manda Una Señal" in 2007.

"Lo Mejor de Tu Vida" is also recognized as one of Iglesias's signature songs and has been covered by several singers, including Tamara, Simone, Ray Conniff, Bertín Osborne and Alexandre Pires.

== Background ==
Julio Iglesias was the most popular Latin singer of the 1970s and 1980s, selling over 100 million albums around the world. In 1968, he was a contestant at the 1968 Spanish Song Festival at Benidorm, singing his original song "La Vida Sigue Igual". Iglesias won the first prize at the contest, which led to a record contract with Columbia, an independent record label. During the 1970s, he toured Europe and Latin America, gaining a large fan base with hits like 1975's "Manuela", written by Manuel Alejandro. A few years before, Iglesias was watching another performer during a music festival and thought that the song he was singing was beautiful, began asking who was the writer of the track, and someone told him that the songwriter was Manuel Alejandro. Iglesias refers to Alejandro as the "greatest Spanish songwriter in history." Alejandro and Iglesias worked together again on Un hombre solo which was awarded the Grammy for Best Latin Pop Performance and sold three million copies worldwide. Manuel Alejandro said to the Spanish newspaper La Revista that Iglesias was the best performer of his songs, and praised the simplicity of his work.

== Chart performance ==
The song debuted on the Billboard Hot Latin Tracks chart at number 14 on May 30, 1987, and climbed to the top of the chart the following week. "Lo Mejor de Tu Vida" set the record for the biggest leap to the top in the chart's history. After almost 20 years, Iglesias' record was broken by Mexican rock band Maná, who soared 22-1 with "Manda Una Señal". This track spent 13 non-consecutive weeks at number-one, the most for a male performer in the Hot Latin Tracks chart at the time.

Chart (1987)	Peak position
US Billboard Hot Latin Tracks	1

== Personnel ==
This information adopted from Allmusic.

- Manuel Alejandro – producer, piano
- Assa Drori – concertina
- Rafael Ferro-García – keyboards
- Michael Fisher – percussion
- Humberto Gatica – engineer, mixer
- Julio Iglesias – vocals
- Randy Kerber – keyboards
- Abraham Laboriel – bass
- Michael Landau – guitar
- Michael Lang – keyboards
- Gayle Levant – harp
- Fernando López – guitar
- Greg Mathieson – keyboards
- Rafael Padilla – percussion
- Carlos Vega – drums
- Pepe Sánchez – drums

== Cover versions ==
"Lo Mejor de Tu Vida" has been recorded by several performers, including Alexandre Pires who released it as a single from his album A un Idolo (2007), peaking at number 23 in the Hot Latin Tracks. Spanish singer Tamara also did a version of this song, and included it on her album of the same name—a tribute to Julio Iglesias, produced by Max Pierre. Tamara's album peaked at number 8 in the Spanish Album chart. Simone, Bertín Osborne, Ray Conniff and Yayi Gómez also recorded their own version of the track.

A Cantopop version of "Lo Mejor de Tu Vida" was recorded by Hong Kong songstress, Aling Choi, in 1990, in her solo-album The Simple Life. The canto-lyrics was written by Richard Lam and remained a deeply romantic ballad describing the course of life and love as if it's river. The song proved to be so successful in the canto-version that up to 4 to 5 covered versions were recorded by various Hong Kong artists.
