= Y Tú También Llorarás =

Single by José Luis Rodríguez "El Puma"

from the album Señor Corazón
- Released: 1987
- Recorded: 1987
- Genre: Latin pop · Latin ballad
- Length: 4:23
- Label: PolyGram Discos
- Songwriter: Albert Hammond · Anahi van Zandweghe
- Producer: Albert Hammond

José Luis Rodríguez "El Puma" singles chronology
"Y Tú También Llorarás" (1987)	"Por Esa Mujer" (1988)

"Y Tú También Llorarás" (English: And You Will Cry Too) is a ballad written and produced by British singer-songwriter Albert Hammond, co-written by Anahí van Zandweghe, and performed by Venezuelan singer-songwriter and actor José Luis Rodríguez "El Puma". It was released as the first single from his studio album Señor Corazón (1987). This song became his first number one hit in the Billboard Hot Latin Tracks chart, and was later covered by Raulín Rosendo.

The song debuted on the Billboard Hot Latin Tracks chart at number 24 on 7 November 1987 and climbed to the top of the chart four weeks later. It spent six weeks at number-one, replacing "Qué No Se Rompa la Noche" by Spanish performer Julio Iglesias and being replaced by "Soy Así" by Mexican performer José José. "Y Tú También Llorarás" spent 24 weeks on the chart and ranked at number three in the Hot Latin Tracks Year-End Chart of 1988.

== Charts ==
Chart (1987)	Peak position
U.S. Billboard Hot Latin Tracks	1
