= Desde Andalucía =

Studio album by Isabel Pantoja
- Released: May 03, 1988
- Recorded: 1987–1988
- Genre: Pop Latin
- Label: RCA
- Producer: Juan Gabriel

Isabel Pantoja chronology
Marinero de luces (1985)	Desde Andalucía (1988)	Se me enamora el alma (1989)

Singles from Desde Andalucía
- 1. "Así fue" Released: 1988; 2. "Hazme tuya una vez más" Released: 1988; 3. "Queriendo y no" Released: 1988

Professional ratings
Review scores
Source	Rating
Allmusic	4/5 stars

Desde Andalucía (English: From Andalusia) is the 12th studio album by Spanish singer Isabel Pantoja, released in 1988. The album became a success on the Latin Pop Albums charts. The album received a Lo Nuestro award for Pop Album of the Year. By 1993 the record had sold over 1.3 million copies.

== Track listing ==
1. "Hazme Tuya Una Vez Más" – 6:09
2. "Queriendo y No" – 5:15
3. "Ojos Azules Como el Mar" – 4:07
4. "Hoy Todos Mis Días" – 8:13
5. "Cuántos Días Más" – 4:18
6. "Así Fue" – 5:32
7. "Luna Llena" – 5:59
8. "Recordándote" – 5:40
9. "Virgen del Rocío" – 6:00

== Chart performance ==
Chart (1988)/(1989)	Peak position
US Billboard Latin Pop Albums	1

== See also ==
- List of Billboard Latin Pop Albums number ones from the 1980s
