= Jossie Esteban y la Patrulla 15 =

Merengue band from Dominican Republic

Jossie Esteban y La Patrulla 15
- Origin: La Vega, Dominican Republic
- Genres: Merengue, Tropical Music
- Years active: 1978–1998
- Labels: Amapola Records, Gema Records, Artomax Records, Top Ten Hits Records, Ringo Records, Platano Records
- Website: N/A

Jossie Esteban y la Patrulla 15 is a leading Merengue band from Dominican Republic, formed by Jossie Esteban (born Esteban Grullón) and Alberto Martínez (known as Ringo).

The group was formed by these Dominican childhood friends in May 1979. Its musicians were predominantly Dominicans but also included some Puerto Ricans. Their debut album El Cuchu Cu Cha was a hit, and since then they have recorded more than 20 records, winning awards such as “the gold congo” in Colombia, “orchestra of the year” in New York, and a number of platinum discs. Some of their hit songs are "Agua de Coco" (Coconut Water), "Pirulo", "El Can" (The Party), "Un hombre busca una mujer" (a man looks for a woman), "Enamoraito" (love-struck) etc.

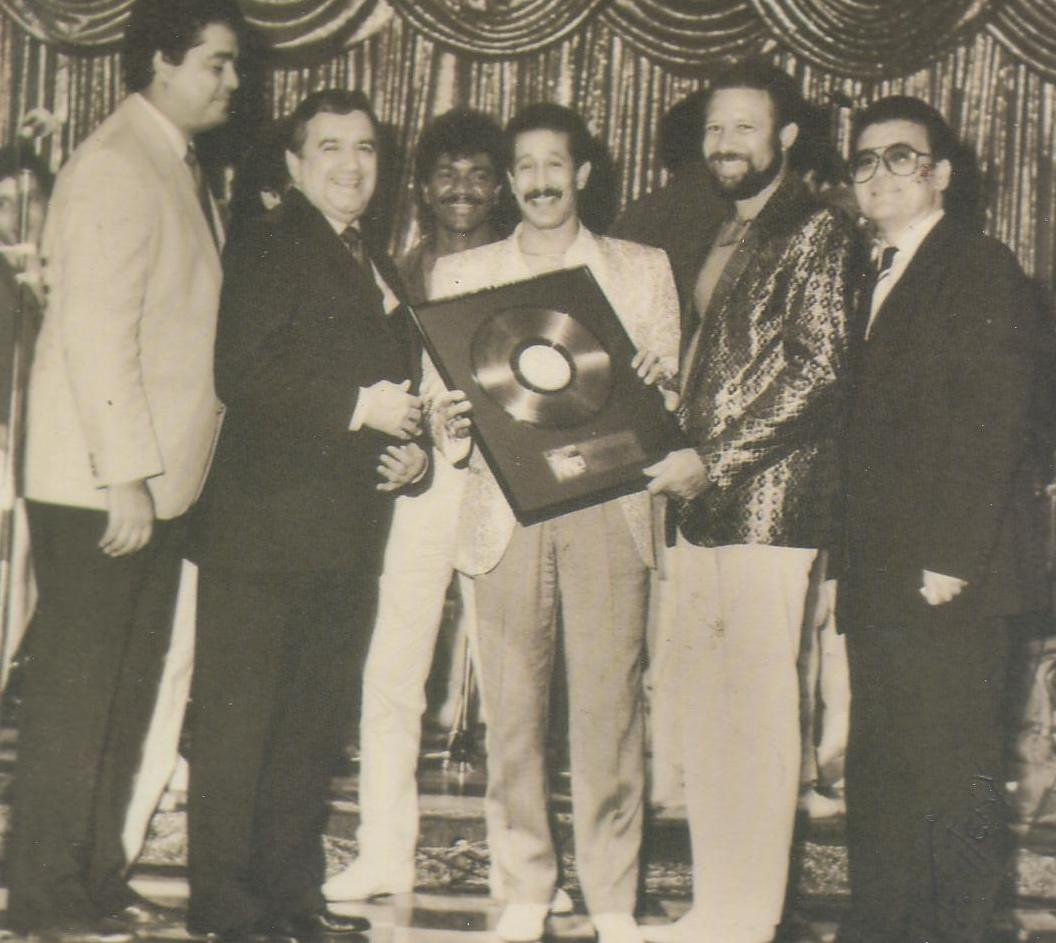

Since 1992 Jossie Esteban has also been part of the successful Merengue group, Zona Roja.

== Musicians of La Patrulla 15 ==
- Esteban Grullon "Jossie Esteban" (1975–1998) Vocals, Songwriter, Arranger & Chorus.
- Alberto Martinez "Ringo" (1975–1998) Piano, Songwriter, Arranger & Chorus.
- Euripides González Feliz ( júnior)(1978–1983) Saxophone, Songwriter & Arranger.
- Henry Hierro - Arranger, Bajo (1975 - 1977)
- Willie Hierro - Cantante (1975 - 1977)
- Edgar Cedeño (1978–1998) Saxophone & Arranger.
- Carlos Peña (1984–1998) Saxophone & Arranger.
- Nelson Garcia (1980) Trompet & Arranger.
- Arelis Peguero (1978–1998) Trompet.
- Alfonso Quesada (1978–1985) Tambora, Campana, Clave & Redoblante.
- Rafael "Juni" Brito – Tambora
- Felix Suero – Guira
- Nez Cafe – Conga
- Heriberto Picart – Bajo
- Salvador Lamourt (1978–1998) Trombone.
- Eddie Gomez – Bajo
- Romualdo Tatis – Guira
- Elias Lopes – Trompet
- Hernesto "Chiriki" Henriquez – Trompet
- Juan Mejias – Guira & Bombo
- Jackie Lera – Congas
- Angel Vazquez – Bajo
- Rey Mundi – Trombone
- Caffe Cruz – Congas
- Daniel Peña – Saxophone (only in 1983 songs "ay si, ay no" & "deja ese diablo")
- Jose Rolando Tatis – Guira
- Freddy Miranda – Saxophone
- Nelson "Brigi" Ruiz – Tambora, Bateria & Bombo
- Elias Santana – Flujel (invited only for the song "Viviras")
- Reynaldo Torres – Trompet
- Miguel Rodriguez – Trompet
- Benny Marin – Saxophone
- Alcides Gil – Conga
- Carlos Aviles – Trompet
- Alfredo Torres – Trombone
- Ysrael Casado – Piano
- Cheo Quiñones – Chorus
- William Berrios – Vocals & Chorus
- Tony Ramirez – Vocals & Chorus
- Martin Martinez – Vocals, Songwriter & Chorus
- Alfred Cotto – Chorus

== Discography of La Patrulla 15 ==
| 2.MERENGUE DE HOY | 3.CUCHU CUCHÁ | '4.LA PATRULLA 15 1979 GEMA RECORDS | 1980 GEMA RECORDS | 1980 GEMA RECORDS |
| 01.Nueva York Es Así 02.Eso Que Tú Me Pides 03.Nathalie 04.Pedro y Juana 05.Regálame Esta Noche 06.La Bailadora 07.Ramona 08.Hace Tiempo 09.No Me Pidas Que Te Olvide | 01.Cuchú Cuchá 02.Homenaje a Pedro Flores 03.Podré Volver a Ti 04.Que Barbaridad 05.El Negrito del Batey 06.Me Enamoré 07.Tu Va' Vei 08.La Negra | 01.Acordeón, Güiro y Tambor 02.Dímelo Cantando 03.Cementerio 04.Clavelito 05.Májalo Tú 06.Mala Maña 07.El Amor Es Una Locura 08.Capullito de Alelí 09.El Sapo y la Estaca 10.Llévalo Contigo | | |

| 5.ESTÁN ENCENDIOS! | 6.LA PATRULLA 15 PT.2 | 7.DEJA ESE DIABLO |
|---|---|---|
| 1981 GEMA RECORDS | 1982 ARTOMAX RECORDS | 1983 ARTOMAX RECORDS |
| 01.Juicio Final 02.Dale Que Dale 03.Mi Compadre 04.Cepilla 05.La Coja 06.El Zumbador 07.Borinquen y Quisqueya 08.El Mesías | 01.Sin Tu Cariño 02.Flecha Envenenada 03.Morena 04.Ay Ñeñe 05.Camara 06.Paloma Blanca 07.Me Dejaste Pum 08.Ay, Ya, Yay 09.La Fiesta 10.La Papaya | 01.Deja Ese Diablo 02.Por Ahí, Por Ahí 03.Mi Mujer 04.Ay Si, Ay No 05.Las Locas 06.Las Tres Marías 07.La Muerte de Mi Pancho 08.El Incógnito |

| 8.EL AÑOÑAITO | 9.EL MUCHACHITO | 10.NOCHES DE COPAS |
|---|---|---|
| 1984 TTH RECORDS | 1985 TTH RECORDS | 1986 TTH RECORDS |
| 01.El Añoñaito 02.Por Qué Me Engañas 03.Tú Sabes 04.Que Viva el Pueblo 05.Tengo Una Mamá 06.Yo Me Siento Enamorao 07.Que No Me Mires 08.Johanny | 01.De Qué Color Es el Amor 02.Seguro Que Si 03.No Sonríes 04.El Muchachito 05.El Can 06.Pirulo 07.Enamoraito 08.Estos Celos | 01.Noche de Copas 02.El Coco 03.Dame Un Beso 04.Colorá 05.Hace Mucho Tiempo 06.La Caballá 07.Pelú 08.Necesito Verte |

| 11.ACARÍCIAME | 12.CON FUERZA | 13.O.K...ALL RIGHT |
|---|---|---|
| 1987 TTH RECORDS | 1988 TTH RECORDS | 1989 TTH RECORDS |
| 01.El Dolor 02.En Dónde Estás 03.Aunque Digan 04.Las Mujeres 05.Te Quiero, Te Quiero 06.Acaríciame 07.Si No lo Dejas 08.Oho-Aha | 01.Amar y Perder 02.Te Voy a Hacer Llorar 03.Si Tú Me Dices 04.Vivirás (Balada) 05.¿Qué? ¡Aha! 06.Vivirás (Merengue) 07.Para Volver 08.Mon Amour | 01.Sólo Sé Que Fue En Marzo 02.El Cantinero 03.Cógele Confianza 04.Que Porqué Te Quiero 05.El Moreno Está 06.Ya No Puedo Seguir 07.Así Se Quiere 08.Corazón Contento |

| 14.EN ACCIÓN | 15.HOT | 16.HOTTER THAN EVER |
|---|---|---|
| 1990 TTH RECORDS | 1991 TTH RECORDS | 1992 TTH RECORDS |
| 01.El Cantinero Rap 02.La Negra 03.No Tienes Corazón 04.Quisiera Ser 05.Pa' Que Digan 06.La Muchacha 07.No Creo Nada 08.Un Hombre Busca Una Mujer | 01.El Colchón de Agua 02.Y Bebo de Noche y Bebo de Día 03.Ese Huevo Quiere Sal 04.Me Gusta También 05.Pegando el Pecho 06.El Cariño Es Como Una Flor 07.El Cigarro 08.Traición | 01.El Tiguerón 02.El Muñeco 03.Que Me Vengo Cayendo 04.Dame 05.Perfidia 06.Sopita de Cabro 07.La Carga 08.Regálame Esta Noche 09.Quisiera Ser 10.Yo lo Cojo Easy |

| 17.SEGUIMOS HACIENDO HISTORIA | 18.NUESTRO 15TO ANIVERSARIO | 19.PARA RECONQUISTARTE |
|---|---|---|
| 1993 TTH RECORDS | 1994 RINGO RECORDS | 1995 RINGO RECORDS |
| 01.Me voy a emborrachar 02.Pensándolo Bien 03.Vivo Enamorado 04.Enterita 05.Por Un Maní 06.Eras Una Niña 07.El Retrato 08.Muchacho Vamo a Beber | 01.El Meneito 02.Popurrí 03.La Fea 04.Me Estoy Enamorando 05.Como Un Niño Lloré 06.Sabado, Domingo y Lunes 07.Me Pongo Medio Loco 08.Mueve la Cintura 09.Tú Me Pides Que Te Olvide 10.Llegó Navidad | 01.O lo Matas Tú, O lo Mato Yo 02.El Asopao 03.Dame el Bacalao 04.Volcán 05.Échale Agua 06.Para Reconquistarte 07.No Me Desprecies 08.Hay Otra En Tu Lugar |

| 20.DE FIESTA | 21.LA COLOTA | 22.NUESTRO 20 ANIVERSARIO |
|---|---|---|
| 1996 RINGO RECORDS | 1997 RINGO RECORDS | 1998 PLATANO RECORDS |
| 01.Más Feo Que Yo 02.Se Murió Mi Canario 03.¿Qué Pasa Contigo? 04.Adultera 05.De Fiesta 06.El Presentao 07.Vuelvo a Cantar 08.Volveré a Conquistar | 01.La Colota 02.Que Lindo Es el Amor 03.Que Viva Mi Suegra 04.Por Amarte 05.Ta' Cañón 06.Dile Que el Amor Existe 07.Brindo Por Esa Mujer 08.Yo Me Enamoré | 01.La Mujer del Vecino, Se la Están... 02.No Puedo Con Ella 03.Otra Vez Bebiendo (El Mujerón) 04.Me Quiere Chavar 05.Dama, Dama 06.Ay Mami 07.Con Mi Morenita 08.Yo Nací Pegao |
