= Un hombre solo =

Studio album by Julio Iglesias
- Released: April 1987
- Recorded: 1986–1987
- Studios: Torres Sonido Parquelagos (Madrid); Lion Share (Los Angeles); Record Plant (Los Angeles); Criteria (Miami)
- Genre: Latin pop
- Length: 39:11
- Label: CBS
- Producer: Manuel Alejandro

Julio Iglesias chronology
Libra (1985)	Un hombre solo (1987)	Tutto l'amore che ti manca (1987)

Singles from Un hombre solo
- 1. "Lo Mejor de Tu Vida" Released: 1987; 2. "Que No Se Rompa la Noche" Released: 1987; 3. "Todo el amor que te hace falta" Released: 1987; 4. "Alguien" Released: 1988

Un hombre solo (English: A Man Alone) is a Julio Iglesias album released in April 1987. It achieved worldwide success. The album was composed, arranged and produced by Manuel Alejandro. In 1988, it won the Grammy Award for Best Latin Pop Album.The album was released in LP, CD and Digipack format, with 2 editions: worldwide and Brazil. He received platinum distinction in different countries like: Argentina (8×); Mexico, Colombia, Chile, Spain, Brazil (5×); Venezuela and Sony Discos (4×).

== Track listing ==
No.	Title	Writer(s)	Length
1.	"Lo Mejor de Tu Vida"	Manuel Alejandro, Marian Beigbeder	4:17
2.	"Todo el amor que te hace falta"	Manuel Alejandro, Ana Magdalena	5:20
3.	"Intentando otra vez enamorarte"	Manuel Alejandro, Sandra Beigbeder	3:32
4.	"Procura Hablarle Tu"	Manuel Alejandro, Marian Beigbeder	3:48
5.	"Que No Se Rompa la Noche"	Manuel Alejandro, Ana Magdalena	4:26
6.	"Un hombre solo"	Manuel Alejandro, Marian Beigbeder	3:52
7.	"Te voy a dejar de querer"	Manuel Alejandro, Ana Magdalena	4:55
8.	"Evadiéndome"	Manuel Alejandro, Sandra Beigbeder	3:50
9.	"Alguien"	Manuel Alejandro, Marian Beigbeder	3:27
10.	"El mar que llevo dentro"	Manuel Alejandro, Sandra Beigbeder	1:44
Total length:			39:11

Note: the label number is: 450908 2; the EAN number is: 5099745090822; the edition (standard) of this album is: worldwide; the format of this album is CD

== Brasil edition ==
1. "O melhor de tua vida" – 4:03
2. "Todo o amor que te faz falta" – 4:32
3. "O que fazer?" – 4:03
4. "Procure ser feliz" – 3:31
5. "Que no se rompa la noche" – 4:26
6. "América" – 4:27
7. "Un hombre solo" – 3:52
8. "Intentando otra vez enamorarte" – 3:32
9. "Doce superstar" – 3:18
10. "Evadiéndome"– 3:50
11. "El mar que llevo dentro" – 1:44

== Charts ==
=== Weekly charts ===
Weekly chart performance for Un Hombre Solo
Chart (1987)	Peak position
European Albums (Music & Media)	67
Spanish Albums (AFYVE)	1
US Latin Pop Albums (Billboard)	1

=== All-time charts ===
All-time chart performance for Un Hombre Solo
Chart (1985–1994)	Position
US Latin Pop Albums (Billboard)	3

=== Year-end charts ===
Year-end chart performance for Un Hombre Solo
Chart (1987)	Position
Brazilian Albums (Nopem)	41
Spanish Albums (AFYVE)	4
US Latin Pop Albums (Billboard)	7

Chart (1988)	Position
US Latin Pop Albums (Billboard)	3

== Certification ==
Region	Certification	Certified units/sales
Argentina (CAPIF)	8× Platinum	480,000^{^}
Brazil (Pro-Música Brasil)	5× Platinum	1,250,000^{*}
Chile	5× Platinum	
Colombia	Platinum	
Mexico (AMPROFON)	3× Platinum	750,000^{^}
Spain (Promusicae)	5× Platinum	500,000^{^}
Venezuela	4× Platinum	
Summaries
Worldwide	—	3,000,000
^{*} Sales figures based on certification alone.^{^} Shipments figures based on certification alone.

== See also ==
- List of number-one Billboard Latin Pop Albums from the 1980s
- List of best-selling Latin albums
