= Así Fue =

1988 single by Isabel Pantoja

Single by Isabel Pantoja

from the album Desde Andalucía
- Language: Spanish
- English title: "That's the Way It Went"
- B-side: "Ojos Azules Como el Mar"
- Released: 1988
- Length: 5:25
- Label: RCA
- Songwriter: Juan Gabriel
- Producer: Juan Gabriel

Isabel Pantoja singles chronology
"Hazme Tuya una Vez Más" (1988)	"Así Fue" (1988)	"Cuántos Días Más" (1989)

"Así Fue" ("That's the Way it Went" or "That's How it Was" or "It is what it is") is a song written and produced by Mexican singer-songwriter Juan Gabriel and performed by Spanish singer Isabel Pantoja. It was released in 1988 as the second single from her studio album Desde Andalucía (1988). The song tells of the singer dealing with her ex-lover after she has a new fiancé. It reached No. 2 on the Billboard Hot Latin Songs chart in the United States, and was the fifth best-performing Spanish-language single of 1989 in the US. The song's composer, Juan Gabriel, performed a live rendition of the song at the Palacio de Bellas Artes in Mexico City which was recorded and released as a live album titled Celebrando 25 Años de Juan Gabriel: En Concierto en el Palacio de Bellas Artes (1998).

Juan Gabriel's 1998 version was released as a single from the live album and reached No. 3 on the Hot Latin Songs chart. It was the best-performing Spanish-language single of 1998 in the US, and won the American Society of Composers, Authors and Publishers (ASCAP) Latin Award for "Super Song of the Year" in 1999. The track was well received by music critics, who called it one of Juan Gabriel's best compositions. "Así Fue" has been performed and recorded by several other artists, including Toño Rosario, Playa Limbo, and Jenni Rivera. Rosario and Playa Limbo's versions led to Juan Gabriel winning another ASCAP Latin Award for their covers, while Playa Limbo received a nomination for Pop Song of the Year at the 22nd Annual Lo Nuestro Awards in 2010.

== Background and release ==
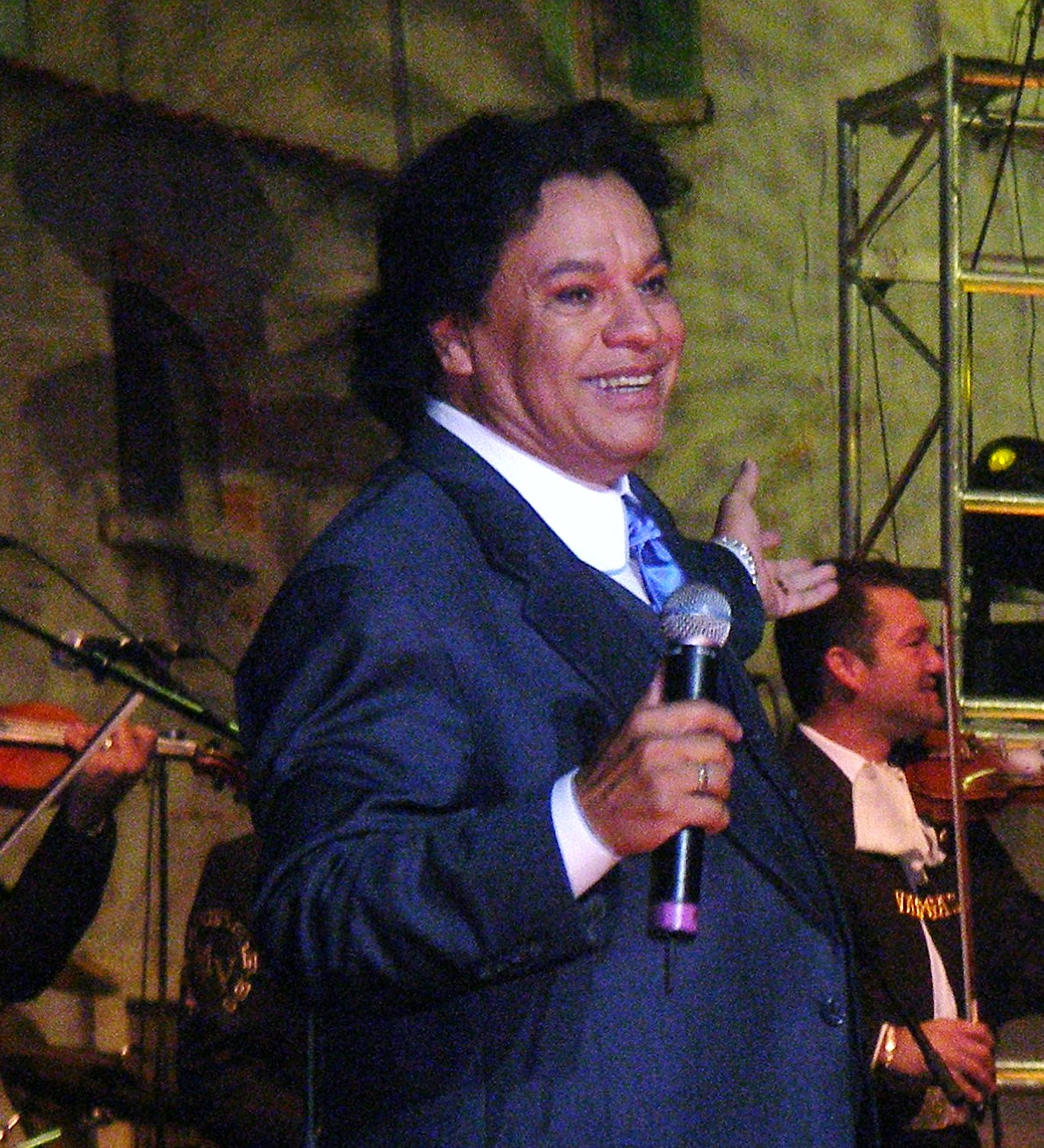
"Así Fue" was composed by Mexican singer-songwriter Juan Gabriel who produced Pantoja's album Desde Andalucía. He would later perform a live version of the song in 1997.

In 1985, Isabel Pantoja released Marinero de Luces, an album written and produced by José Luis Perales with the music tracks written by Perales. This was her first album in three years following the death of her husband, Spanish bullfighter Paquirri, in the bullring of Pozoblanco. The album was a success in Spain and brought her back in the spotlight. Two years later, Pantoja released "Tú Serás Mi Navidad" ("You Will Be My Christmas"), a song composed by singer-songwriter Juan Gabriel. According to Juan Gabriel, he was sought by Pantoja in Ciudad Juárez where the duo recorded the song. Juan Gabriel also mentioned that he was composing and producing her next studio album which would be titled Desde Andalucía. The record was released in 1988 and reached the top of the Billboard Latin Pop Albums chart in the United States. Unlike her previous records, which she performed under the Spanish copla genre, the music of Desde Andalucía featured a balada romántica form of Latin music.

"Así Fue" was released as the second single from the album in 1988 and peaked at number two on the Billboard Hot Latin Songs in the US on the week of 18 February 1989. It held this position for eleven non-consecutive weeks. The track ended 1989 as the fifth-best performing Latin single of the year in the country.

A music video for "Así Fue" was filmed at a venue where Pantoja receives roses and a letter from her ex-lover. She then performs the song at the venue where her former boyfriend is attending. In 2013, Pantoja performed the song live at the Palacio de Bellas Artes in Mexico City during Juan Gabriel's concert where he was celebrating his 40th anniversary of his music career. Juan Gabriel's presentation was later released as a live album titled Mis 40 en Bellas Artes (2014).

== Juan Gabriel version ==
"Así Fue"

Single by Juan Gabriel

from the album Celebrando 25 Años de Juan Gabriel: En Concierto en el Palacio de Bellas Artes
- B-side: "Ya No Vuelvo a Molestarte"
- Released: 1998
- Recorded: 22 August 1997
- Length: 5:50
- Label: BMG
- Songwriter: Juan Gabriel
- Producer: Juan Gabriel

Juan Gabriel singles chronology
"Te Sigo Amando" (1997)	"Así Fue" (1998)	"Querida" (1998)

On 22 August 1997, Juan Gabriel held a concert at the Palacio de Bellas Artes to commemorate the 25th anniversary of his music career. During the show, Juan Gabriel performed a live rendition of "Así Fue". The concert was recorded and later released as a live album titled Celebrando 25 Años de Juan Gabriel: En Concierto en el Palacio de Bellas Artes (1998). "Así Fue" was released as the record's lead single and peaked at number three on the Hot Latin Songs chart in the US. The track ended 1998 as the best-performing Latin single of the year in the US. It also peaked at number four on the Billboard Latin Pop Songs and number two on the Regional Mexican Songs charts respectively.

Juan Gabriel's performance of the track during his presentation at the Palacio de Bellas Artes was released as a music video. Griselda Flores of Billboard magazine named "Así Fue" one of his most memorable performances following his death in 2016 while an editor for TVyNovelas ranked it number five as his best song. It was recognized as "Super Song of the Year" and "Pop/Ballad Song of the Year" at the 1999 American Society of Composers, Authors and Publishers (ASCAP) Latin Awards. In 2015, Juan Gabriel and Pantoja recorded the song together on his duet album Los Dúo.

=== Charts ===
==== Weekly charts ====
Chart (1998)	Peak position
Costa Rica (Notimex)	4
El Salvador (Notimex)	1
Panama (Notimex)	2
US Hot Latin Songs (Billboard)	3
US Latin Pop Airplay (Billboard)	4
US Regional Mexican Airplay (Billboard)	2

==== Year-end charts ====
Chart (1998)	Position
US Hot Latin Songs (Billboard)	1
US Latin Pop Songs (Billboard)	3

==== All-time charts ====
Chart (2021)	Position
US Hot Latin Songs (Billboard)	42

== Other cover versions ==
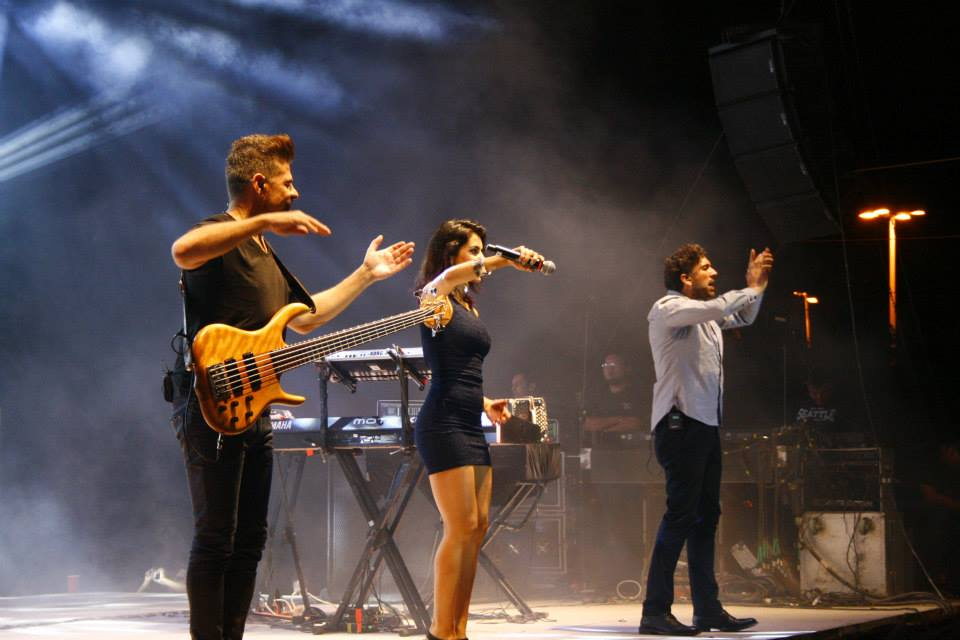
Mexican group Playa Limbo (pictured) covered the song.

In 1998, Dominican merengue singer Toño Rosario covered "Así Fue" on his studio album Exclusivo. Rosario's version peaked at No. 22 on the US Hot Latin Songs chart, and No. 8 on the US Tropical Songs chart, earning songwriter Juan Gabriel another ASCAP Latin award for the song (in the merengue category). In the same year, Mexican banda group La Arrolladora Banda El Limón covered it on their album, Antes de Partir, with their version reaching number 9 on the grupera charts in Mexico. In 2008, Sony Music Mexico released a tribute album to Juan Gabriel titled Amo al Divo de Juárez: Tributo al Juan Gabriel which features various rock musicians performing his songs. Mexican band Playa Limbo was one of artists listed in the album where they covered "Así Fue". Their rendition reached number 26 on the Hot Latin Songs and number 13 on the Latin Pop Songs charts. It received a nomination for Pop Song of the Year at the 22nd Annual Lo Nuestro Awards in 2010 while Juan Gabriel earned an ASCAP Latin Award in the Pop/Ballad field for their cover in the same year.

In 2011, Mexican-American singer Jenni Rivera, the "Queen of Banda", recorded two versions of "Así Fue" for her studio album Joyas Prestadas (2011), which featured two versions—one with pop/rock covers and arrangements and another with her traditionally brass-focused banda sound. The records are composed of cover versions of songs Rivera listened to prior to her fame, when she was working as a record store cashier. Following her untimely death a year later, in 2012, Rivera's rendition of the track received airplay and peaked at No. 33 on the Hot Latin Songs chart. It was one of the two songs Rivera performed live, along with "Como Tu Mujer", during the 19th Billboard Latin Awards ceremony. A live version of "Así Fue" was also included on her album 1969 – Siempre, En Vivo Desde Monterrey, Parte 1 (2013) which features the recordings of her final concert.

== See also ==
- Billboard Top Latin Songs Year-End Chart
