= Amor Libre: 12 Grandes Exitos =

Greatest hits album by Camilo Sesto
- Released: 1988
- Genre: Latin pop
- Length: 42:26
- Label: U.S. Latin

Amor Libre: 12 Grandes Exitos is a greatest hits album by Spanish singer-songwriter Camilo Sesto released in 1988. The album contains twelve songs from his career.

== Tracking Listing ==
_{All tracks by Camilo Sesto}

1. "Amor Libre" – 3:07
2. "Jamas" – 3:22
3. "Quieres Ser Mi Amante" – 4:07
4. "La Culpa Ha Sido Mia" – 3:53
5. "Fresa Salvaje" – 3:11
6. "Mi Mundo Tu" (Sesto, Girón, Javier Losada, Pérez) –
7. "Algo de Mi" – 3:27
8. "Vivir Sin Ti" – 4:11
9. "Vivir es Morir de Amor" – 3:53
10. "Amor de Mujer" (Sesto, Sergio Fachelli) – 3:30
11. "Quererte a Ti" – 4:01
12. "Paloma Blanca, Paloma Mia" (Sesto, Fachelli) – 3:38

== Personnel ==
- Camilo Sesto – vocals

== Chart performance ==
Chart (1988)	Peak position
US Billboard Latin Pop Albums	1

== See also ==
- List of Billboard Latin Pop Albums number ones from the 1980s
