= Paloma Brava (album) =

Paloma brava

Studio album by Rocío Jurado
- Released: 1985
- Recorded: 1985
- Genre: Pop
- Label: EMI

Rocío Jurado chronology
Desde Dentro (1983)	Paloma brava (1985)	Suspiro de Amor (1986)

Paloma brava (Wild Dove) is an album by Spanish pop singer Rocío Jurado. Released in 1985, the album reached number one on the Billboard Latin Pop Albums chart in May 1986.

== Track listing ==
1. "Se Nos Rompio el Amor" 4:31
2. "Se Va a Reir de Ti" 4:33
3. "Vibro" 4:14
4. "Distante" 3:27
5. "Paloma Brava" 3:52
6. "Mejor Te Vas" 4:43
7. "Lo Sabemos Los Tres" 4:31
8. "Como Siempre Que No Estás" 3:54
9. "Perros Perdidos" 4:17
10. "Mi Bruto Bello" 4:01

== See also ==
- List of Billboard Latin Pop Albums number ones from the 1980s
