= List of number-one singles of 1989 (Spain) =

This is a list of the Spanish PROMUSICAE Top 20 Singles number-ones of 1989.

== Chart history ==
Issue date	Song	Artist
2 January	"Nothing's Gonna Change My Love for You"	Glenn Medeiros
9 January	Smooth Criminal	Michael Jackson
16 January	Smooth Criminal	Michael Jackson
23 January	Smooth Criminal	Michael Jackson
30 January	Smooth Criminal	Michael Jackson
6 February	Smooth Criminal	Michael Jackson
13 February	"Kiss"	Tom Jones
20 February	"Real Gone Kid"	Deacon Blue
27 February	"Real Gone Kid"	Deacon Blue
6 March	"Real Gone Kid"	Deacon Blue
13 March	"Like a Prayer"	Madonna
20 March	"Like a Prayer"	Madonna
27 March	"Like a Prayer"	Madonna
3 April	"Like a Prayer"	Madonna
10 April	"Like a Prayer"	Madonna
17 April	"Like a Prayer"	Madonna
24 April	"Like a Prayer"	Madonna
1 May	"Like a Prayer"	Madonna
8 May	"Like a Prayer"	Madonna
15 May	"She Drives Me Crazy"	Fine Young Cannibals
22 May	"Ibiza"	Amnesia
29 May	"Ibiza"	Amnesia
5 June	"Mas y mas"	La Unión
12 June	"Ibiza"	Amnesia
19 June	"Ibiza"	Amnesia
26 June	"The Look"	Roxette
3 July	"The Look"	Roxette
10 July	"The Look"	Roxette
17 July	"The Look"	Roxette
24 July	"The Look"	Roxette
31 July	"The Look"	Roxette
7 August	"The Look"	Roxette
14 August	"The Look"	Roxette
21 August	"Lambada"	Kaoma
28 August	"Lambada"	Kaoma
4 September	"Lambada"	Kaoma
11 September	"Lambada"	Kaoma
18 September	"Lambada"	Kaoma
25 September	"Lambada"	Kaoma
2 October	"Lambada"	Kaoma
9 October	"Lambada"	Kaoma
16 October	"Lambada"	Kaoma
23 October	"Lambada"	Kaoma
30 October	"Lambada"	Kaoma
6 November	"Lambada"	Kaoma
13 November	"Lambada"	Kaoma
20 November	"Swing the Mood"	Jive Bunny and the Mastermixers
27 November	"Swing the Mood"	Jive Bunny and the Mastermixers
4 December	"That's What I Like"	Jive Bunny and the Mastermixers
11 December	"Pump Up the Jam"	Technotronic
18 December	"Pump Up the Jam"	Technotronic
25 December	"Pump Up the Jam"	Technotronic

== See also ==
- 1989 in music
- List of number-one hits (Spain)
- List of number-one singles of the 1980s in Spain
