= Paco Cepero =

Spanish musician

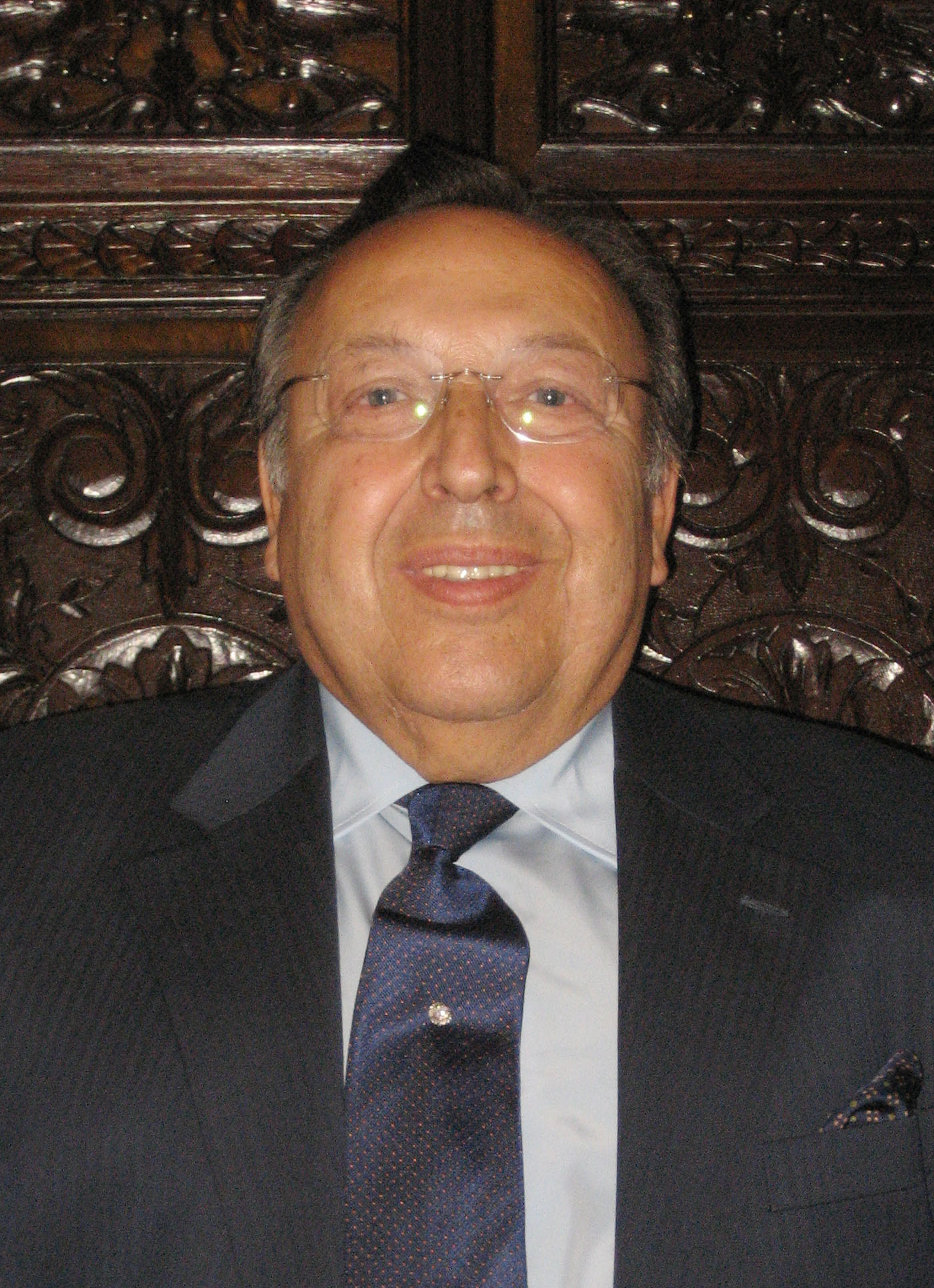
Paco Cepero

Paco Cepero (born 6 March 1942) is a Spanish flamenco guitarist. In addition to accompanying numerous artists, he has released several solo albums, including Corazón y Bordón and De Pura Cepa.

== Beginnings ==
Paco Cepero was born on March 6, 1942, in Jerez de la Frontera (Cádiz Province). At the age of 16 he made his debut as a professional in the Grand Theatre Falla in Cadiz.

In 1963 he arrived in Madrid and started work in the tablao "Los Canasteros" (owned by Manolo Caracol). From then until now he has travelled the world with his guitar, alone or accompanying numerous singers.

== Composing style ==
His songs usually revolve around the themes of impossible, unrequited or betrayed love.

== Awards ==
Evidence of his status as flamenco guitarist are the numerous awards he has won throughout his career; Premio Nacional de Jerez in 1975, Premio Nacional de Córdoba in 1977 and Castillete de la Unión, in addition to the Yunque Oro of the city of Ceuta, the prize Melchor de Marchena Accompaniment and Cabal Silver Circle of Fine Arts for the year 1999. Paco Cepero has played and recorded with figures of incomparable singing including Manolo Caracol, Camaron de la Isla, Tio Borrico, Terremoto, El Lebrijano and El Turronero.

Besides his work as a guitarist, his renown extends to include his work as a composer of numerous successful flamenco and popular songs for such singers as Isabel Pantoja, Julio Iglesias, Lole and Chiquetete.
