= Raíces (Julio Iglesias album) =

Studio album by Julio Iglesias
- Released: 1989
- Genre: Latin pop
- Length: 39:59
- Language: Spanish; Portuguese; Italian; French
- Label: CBS Discos
- Producer: Ramón Arcusa

Julio Iglesias chronology
Non Stop (1988)	Raíces (1989)	Starry Night (1990)

Raíces (Roots) is a studio album by Julio Iglesias, released in 1989. It is an album in medley style of a collection of classic love songs from different countries. Raíces was nominated for a Lo Nuestro Award for Pop Album of the Year.

Professional ratings
Review scores
Source	Rating
Allmusic	link

== Track listing ==
1. "Latino: Intro Latino / Tres Palabras / Perfidia / Amapola / Noche De Ronda / Quizas, Quizas, Quizas / Adios/El Manisero" - 7:15
2. "Caballo Viejo/Bamboleo: Caballo Viejo / Bamboleo / Solo 1" - 4:41
3. "Mexico: Media Vuelta / Se Me Olvido Otra Vez / Y... / Mexico Lindo / Ay Jalisco No Te Rajes / La Bamba / Solo 2" - 9:17
4. "Brasil: Intro Brasil / Desafinado / Mas Que Nada / Manha De Carnaval / Aquarela Do Brasil / Tristeza / Maria Ninguem / Samba De Orfeu" - 7:11
5. "Italia: Intro Italia / Torna a Surriento / Quando M'Innamoro / T'Ho Voluto Bene (Non Dimenticar) / O Sole Mio! / Quando Quando Quando" - 6:18
6. "Francia: Intro Francia / Ne Me Quitte Pas / Que C'est Triste Venise / Et Maintenant / La Vie En Rose" - 5:23

== Charts ==
=== Weekly charts ===
Weekly chart performance for Raíces
Chart (1989-93)	Peak position
Belgian Albums (IFPI)	1
Dutch Albums (Album Top 100)	7
European Albums (Music & Media)	32
Portuguese Albums (AFP)	1
Spanish Albums (AFYVE)	1
Swedish Albums (Sverigetopplistan)	50
US Top Latin Albums (Billboard)	45
US Latin Pop Albums (Billboard)	1

=== Year-end charts ===
Year-end chart performance for Raíces
Chart (1989)	Position
Brazilian Albums (Nopem)	13
Dutch Albums (Album Top 100)	25
European Albums (Music & Media)	85
Portugal Albums (AFP)	1
Spanish Albums (AFYVE)	2
US Latin Pop Albums (Billboard)	5

Chart (1990)	Position
US Latin Pop Albums (Billboard)	14

== Certifications ==
Region	Certification	Certified units/sales
Argentina (CAPIF)	3× Platinum	180,000^{^}
Belgium (BRMA)	Gold	
Brazil (Pro-Música Brasil)	2× Platinum	500,000^{*}
Central America (CFC)	Gold	
Chile	2× Platinum	
Colombia	2× Platinum	
Italy (FIMI)	Gold	50,000^{*}
Mexico (AMPROFON)	2× Platinum	500,000^{^}
Netherlands (NVPI)	Platinum	100,000^{^}
Portugal (AFP)	Platinum	40,000^{^}
Spain (PROMUSICAE)	11× Platinum	1,100,000^{^}
Venezuela	2× Platinum	
^{*} Sales figures based on certification alone.^{^} Shipments figures based on certification alone.

== See also ==
- List of number-one Billboard Latin Pop Albums from the 1980s
- List of best-selling albums in Spain
