= Isabel Pantoja =

Spanish singer

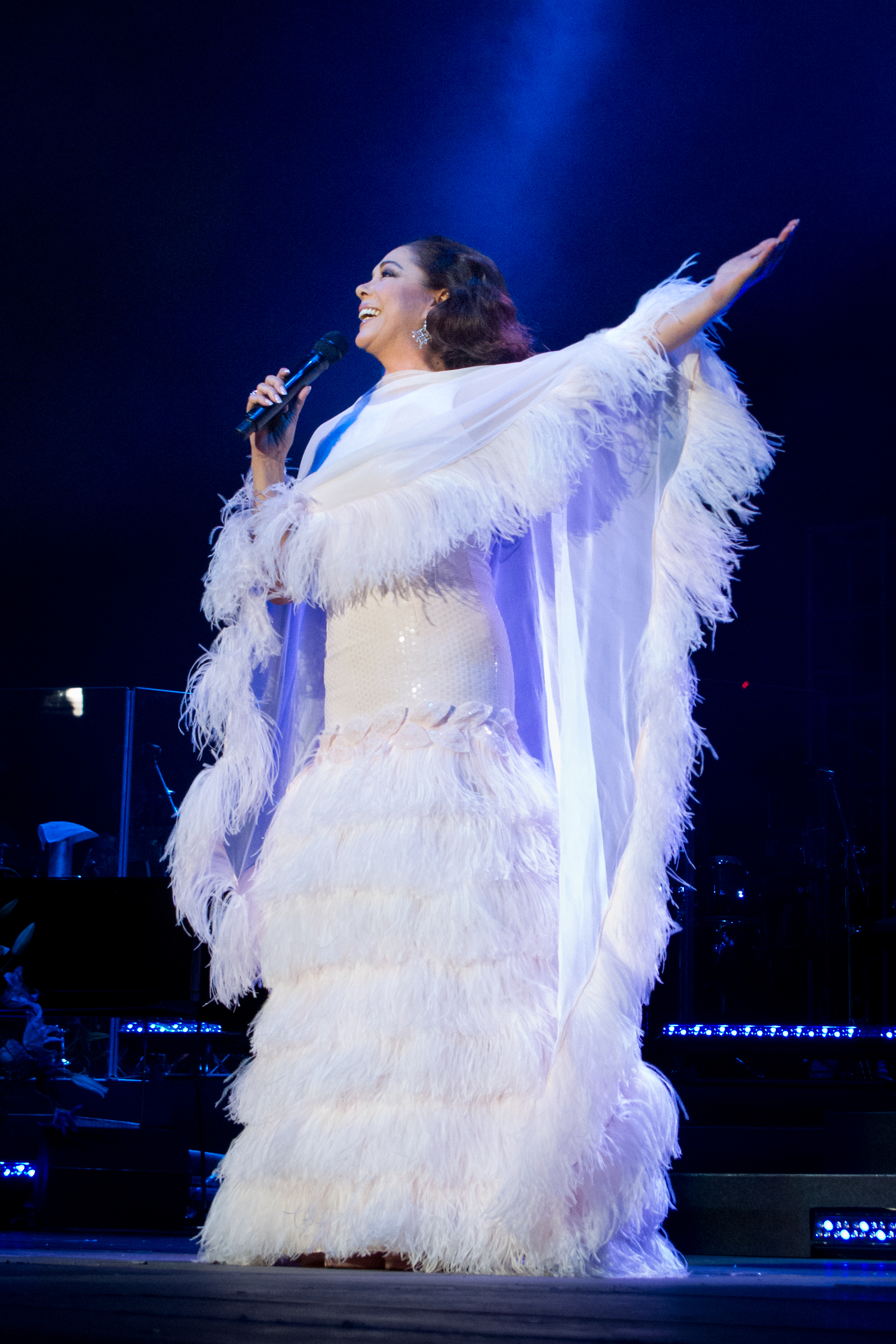
- Born: María Isabel Pantoja Martín; August 2, 1956 (age 70); Seville, Andalusia, Spain
- Other name: La Pantoja
- Spouse: Paquirri (m. 1983; died 1984)
- Partner: Julián Muñoz (2003–2009)
- Children: 2
- Musical career
- Genres: Copla; canción melódica
- Occupation: Singer
- Label: Sony Music
- Website: Official website

María Isabel Pantoja Martín (Spanish pronunciation: [isaˈβel panˈtoxa]; born August 2, 1956) is a Spanish singer. She was born in the Triana district of Seville, Spain. She has released more than a dozen albums throughout a career spanning many decades, mostly of copla genre, and is known for her distinctive Andalusian style.

== Biography ==
She was born in a Romani family of musicians. Both her father and grandfather were singers.

Pantoja began performing precociously at the age of seven in the flamenco ensemble of her cousin Chiquetete. At 17 she met her "maestro" Juan Solano Pedrero, who wrote her first hits along with writer and poet Rafael de León. Pantoja cultivated copla, a genre in decline at the moment that she popularised again. Some of her early hits were "El Pájaro Verde", "Garlochí" or "El Señorito". In 1983 she released her first pop album, Cambiar por ti, which included the same-title song, "En la Niebla", or "Nada". From that moment, Pantoja alternated ballads and romantic songs with copla.

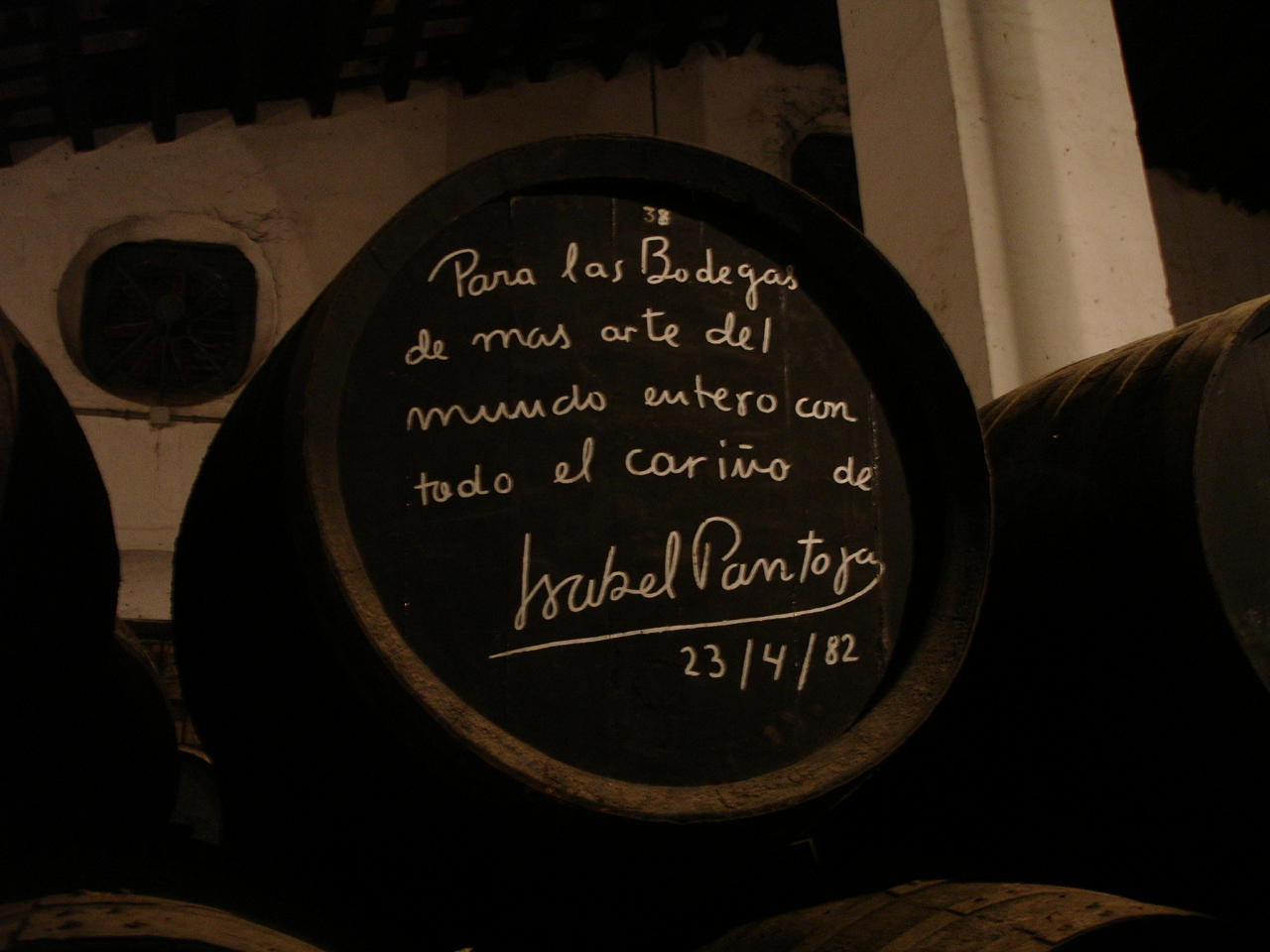
Sherry barrel signed by Isabel Pantoja in the cellars El Pimpi of Málaga.

On April 30, 1983, she married bullfighter Francisco Rivera Pérez "Paquirri"; the wedding was widely covered by the Spanish media as they were both popular and successful and they embodied a romantic Spain stereotype of the bullfighter and the "tonadillera". On September 26, 1984, he died in the bullring; Pantoja became known as "Spain's widow" in the media and a regular cover on gossip magazines. After a prolonged hiatus, she released the album Marinero de Luces, composed by José Luis Perales, that sold one million copies in Spain.

In 1988, she released Desde Andalucía, an album produced by Mexican singer and songwriter Juan Gabriel. In 1989 she released Se me enamora el alma, her most commercial album, with modern programmed beats, composed by Perales.

In 1990, Pantoja starred in the film Yo soy ésa, alongside José Coronado and Loles León, directed by Luis Sanz. A year later, she starred in another film, El día que nací yo, directed by Pedro Olea, alongside Arturo Fernández and Joaquim de Almeida.

Pantoja has released more than a dozen albums and has toured Spain and Latin America extensively over the years.

== Family life ==
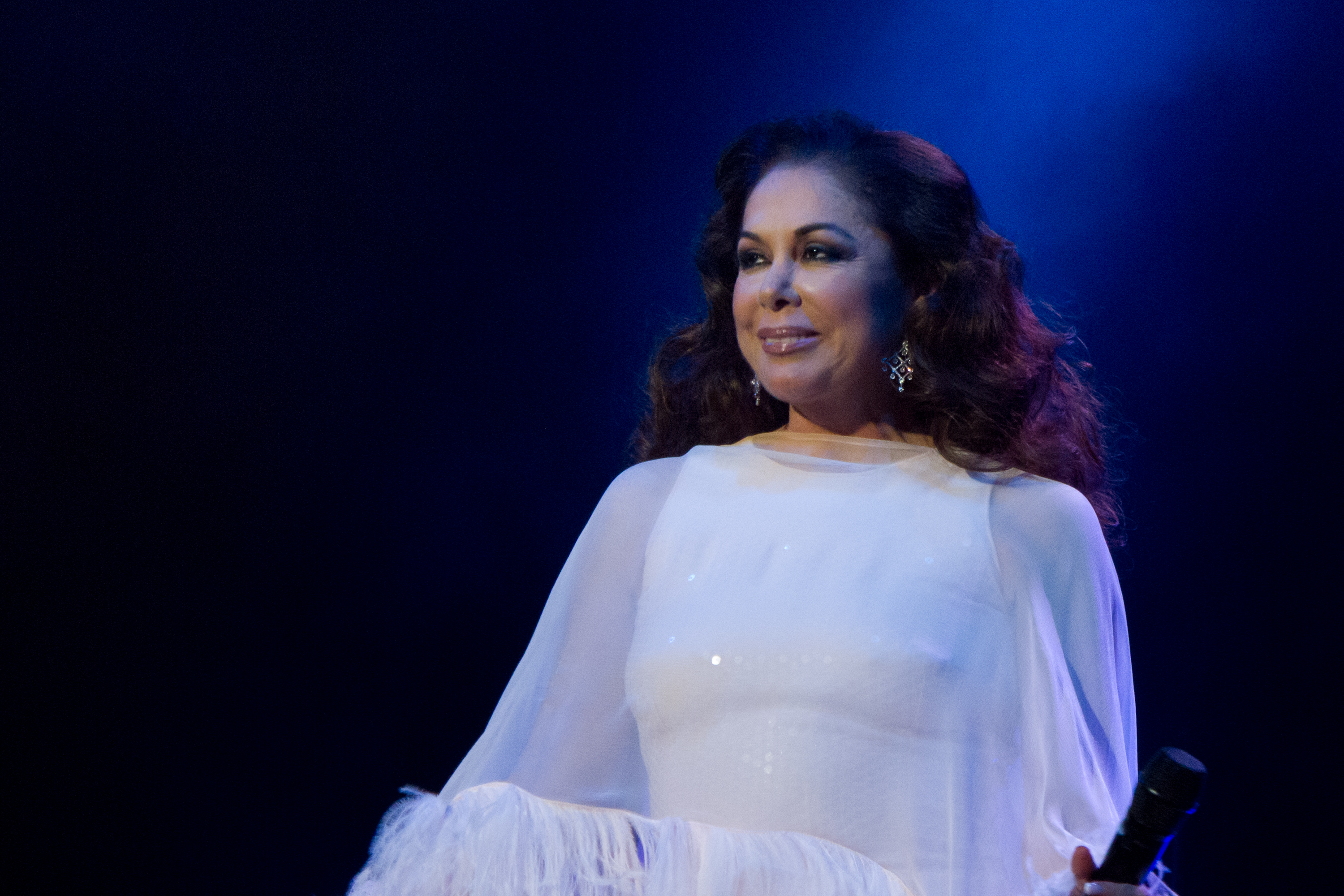
Isabel Pantoja live in Madrid in 2012.

Her husband, the bullfighter Francisco Rivera Pérez, known professionally as "Paquirri", died at the age of 36 in the bullring on September 26, 1984, at the horns of the bull Avispado in Pozoblanco, Córdoba. Isabel Pantoja and "Paquirri" had a son named Francisco José Rivera Pantoja (born February 9, 1984, in Seville), better known as Kiko Rivera or "Paquirrín" by the press. Pantoja has another daughter, named like herself María Isabel Pantoja Martín (born November 8, 1995, in Lima, Peru), whom she adopted in 1996, and who is better known as Isa Pantoja or "Chabelita" by the press. Both her children are television personalities who have participated in reality shows.

== Legal problems ==
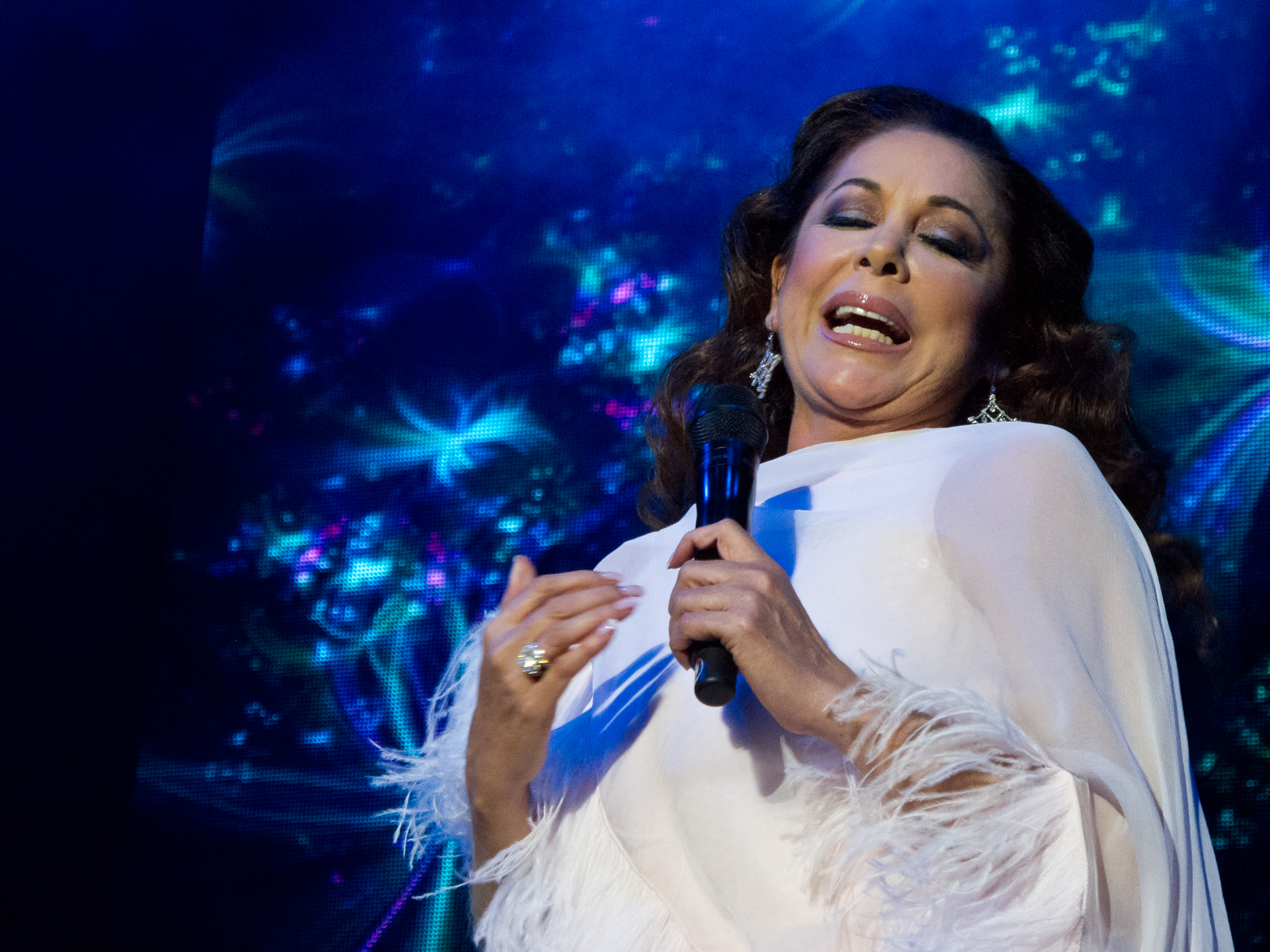
Isabel Pantoja in a concert.

Pantoja was arrested in April 2013 by the Spanish police. She was allegedly an accomplice for her ex-boyfriend, Julián Muñoz, who had been accused of money laundering and bribery (among other criminal activities) while he was mayor of Marbella. Pantoja was found guilty and sentenced to a 24-month prison term. She ultimately would agree to pay nearly €4.0 million, and entered a plea to avoid the jail time.

However, on 3 November 2014, in a turn of events, the jury in Málaga denied Pantoja’s plea and the proposed payment plan, instead sentencing her to be incarcerated immediately, or within three days of the verdict being announced. The trial, and Pantoja's subsequent imprisonment, were widely covered by Spanish and Latin American media, becoming huge international news. She only served around 15 months, however, as she was released from custody on 10 February 2016.

== Discography ==
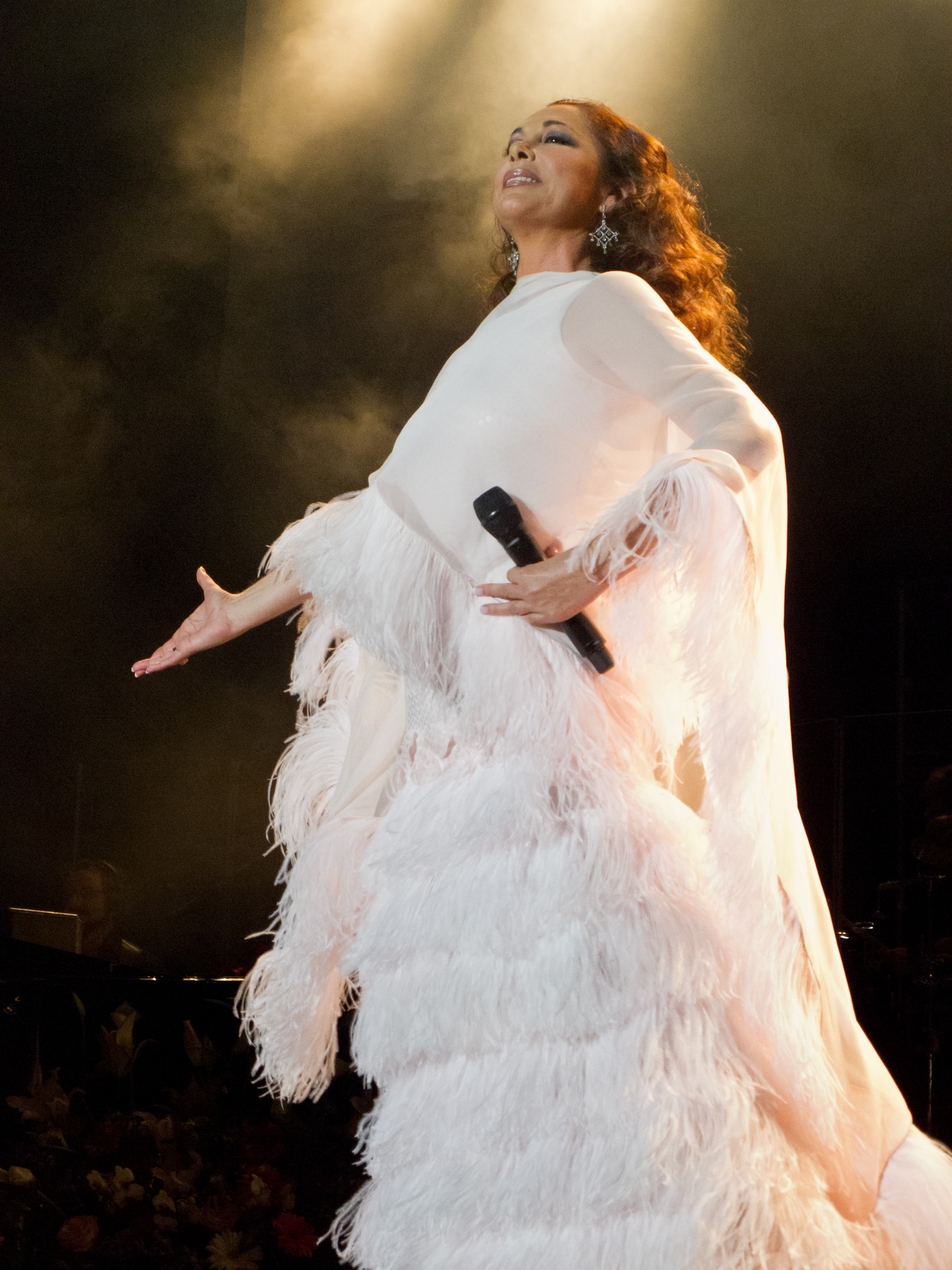
Isabel Pantoja live in Madrid in 2012.

- 1974 – Fue por tu voz
- 1975 – Que dile y dile
- 1976 – Niña Isabela
- 1978 – Y no estaba muerto, no, no
- 1979 – 22 abriles tengo
- 1981 – Al Alimón
- 1981 – Amante, amante
- 1982 – ¡Viva Triana!
- 1983 – Cambiar por ti
- 1985 – Marinero de luces
- 1987 – Tú serás mi Navidad
- 1988 – Desde Andalucía
- 1989 – Se me enamora el alma
- 1990 – La canción española
- 1992 – Corazón herido
- 1993 – De nadie
- 1996 – Amor eterno
- 1998 – Veneno
- 1999 – A tu vera
- 2002 – Donde el corazón me lleve
- 2003 – Soy como soy: grandes éxitos
- 2003 – Mi Navidad flamenca
- 2004 – Buena suerte
- 2005 – By Pumpin' Dolls
- 2005 – Sinfonía de la copla
- 2005 – Mi canción de Navidad
- 2006 – 10 boleros y una canción de amor
- 2010 – Isabel Pantoja (Spanish title) / Encuentro (Latin American title)
- 2016 – Hasta que se apague el sol
- 2020 - Canciones que me gustan

== Filmography ==
- 1990: Yo soy ésa
- 1991: El día que nací yo

== Television ==
Year	Title	Channel	Role	Notes
1978	Cantares	La 1	Guest/Performer	Episode: "Isabel Pantoja"
1980	Retrato en vivo	La 1	Guest/Performer	Episode: "Isabel Pantoja"
1985	Isabel Pantoja a beneficio de la Fundación Reina Sofía	La 1	Performer	Television special
2001	Amigos en la noche	La 1	Host	
2006	Sábado noche	La 1	Host	
2011	Supervivientes 2011	Telecinco	Guest	1 episode
2011	Isabel, a su manera	Telecinco	Performer	Television special
2011–2012	Campanadas de fin de año	Telecinco	Host	Television special
2019	Gran Hermano Dúo	Telecinco	Guest	1 episode
2019	Supervivientes 2019	Telecinco	Contestant	
2019	Paquita Salas	Netflix	Theme song singer	Season 3
2020	Idol Kids	Telecinco	Judge	
2021	Top Star. ¿Cuánto vale tu voz?	Telecinco	Judge	

== See also ==
- Así Fue
- List of best-selling Latin music artists
