= Desde El Principio =

Studio album by Azúcar Moreno
- Released: May 4, 2004
- Recorded: 2004
- Genre: Pop
- Length: 46:45
- Label: Sony International
- Producers: Sergio Castillo; Francisco Amat

Azúcar Moreno chronology
| Únicas (2002) | Desde El Principio (2004) | Bailando Con Lola (2006) |

Professional ratings
Review scores
| Source | Rating |
|---|---|
| Allmusic | (not rated, no review) |

Desde El Principio is the twelfth studio album by Spanish duo Azúcar Moreno, released on Sony International in 2004.

The album saw the Salazar sisters joining forces with a new production team; drummer and percussionist Sergio Castillo and keyboardist Francisco Amat. Castillo and Amat began their career in music in the early 1980s and had previously produced albums with among others Cuban singer Silvio Rodríguez, Tunisian-French Dany Brillant, and in the late 90s and early 2000s most notably the young Spanish rumba-rock duo Estopa to great success. Productionwise Desde El Principio marked a return to Azúcar Moreno's winning formula of the early 90s in that it mixed mainstream Latin pop with material from a wide variety of genres. Tracks like "Sangre Española", "Me Quedo Contigo" and "Vamos a Dejarlo Así" mainly featured drums, percussion and Spanish guitars, recorded live, while lead single "Mi Ritmo" was a typical Azúcar Moreno dance track with a more synthesized and contemporary urban sound. Just like 1991's Mambo the album also featured flamenco/dance covers of a number of pop classics like "Don't Let Me Be Misunderstood", a hit for both Nina Simone and The Animals in the 60s and also turned into disco classic by Santa Esmeralda in 1977, the Neapolitan traditional "¡Oh Sole Mío!", also covered by Elvis Presley in English as "It's Now Or Never", but, Azúcar Moreno's large LGBT following in both Europe and South America considered, most importantly their take on Gloria Gaynor's 1979 gay anthem "I Will Survive", retitled "Sobreviviré".

Despite this Desde El Principio proved to be a modest commercial success. "Mi Ritmo" was somewhat surprisingly the first Azúcar Moreno lead single since the late 1980s to be issued without any accompanying dance remixes, and the follow-up's "Sobreviviré", "Se Me Va" and "El" were never commercially released, but only as promo singles distributed to radio stations and disc jockeys - again without any remixes; in Spain the album sold some 50.000 copies, making it their first studio album since 1988's Carne De Melocotón not to go platinum or multi-platinum in their home country. Desde El Principio also came to be the duo's final album for the Sony Music Entertainment label, a company they after a series of mergers in various forms had been signed to for some fifteen years (CBS Records Spain, Epic Records Spain, CBS-Epic Spain, eventually a sublabel to Sony Music Spain, today a subsidiary to the multinational Sony BMG Music Entertainment conglomerate). In 2006 Azúcar Moreno returned to their previous label EMI Music for the album Bailando Con Lola.

While Sony Music have continued to release hits compilations with Azúcar Moreno all through the 2000s, such as Toda La Pasión De Azúcar Moreno (2001), Colección De Oro (2002), 20 Grandes Exitos (2003), Los Esenciales (2003) and 20 Exitos Originales (2005), as well as numerous mid-price collections, none of these include any new recordings, remixes or tracks not to be found on the duo's ten studio albums for the CBS/Epic/Sony label, several of the duo's greatest hits do however appear in edited form.

== Track listing ==
1. "Mi Ritmo" (Jimeno, Tena) - 3:30
2. "Se Me Va" (Alejandro) - 3:39
3. "Mírame y No Me Toques" (Diaz Reguera, Diaz Reguera, Diaz Cura) - 3:32
4. "Piti Mini" (Granados, Pizarro) - 3:18
5. "Nadie Me Comprende Como Tú" ("Don't Let Me Be Misunderstood") (Benjamin, Caldwell, Marcus) - 3:41
6. "Tu Marcha" (Ganoza Barrionuevo, Martin Escalón, Ortega Heredia) - 3:19
7. "Sangre Española" (Tena, Vargas) - 3:38
8. "Sobreviviré" ("I Will Survive") (Fekaris, Perren) - 4:03
9. "Él" (Sánchez) - 4:30
10. "Un Poco" (Sanchez) - 4:00
11. "Me Quedo Contigo" (with Los Chunguitos, in memory of Enrique) (Ramos Prada, Salazar Salazar) - 3:35
12. "¡Oh Sole Mío!" (Di Capua, Gapurro, Mazzucchi) - 3:34
13. "Vamos a Dejarlo Así" (Acoustic) (Ochaíto, Solano) - 2:16

== Personnel ==
- Azúcar Moreno - lead vocals
- Los Chunguitos - lead vocals "Me Quedo Contigo"
- Tito Dávila - backing vocals
- Richard Marin - rap, backing vocals, quejio
- Sergio Castillo - percussion, programming, drums, palmas
- Francisco Amat - piano, keyboards, programming, palmas
- Paco Bastante - bass guitar
- Merv De Peyer - keyboards
- Luis Dulzaides - percussion
- Marcelo Carlos Fuentes - bass guitar
- Paco Ibanez - trumpet, fliscorno
- Juan Maya - Spanish guitar
- John Parsons - acoustic guitar, electric guitar
- José Antonio Romero - mandolin, electric guitar, lap steel guitar
- Juan Antonio Salazar - Spanish guitar, jaleos
- Alan Steinberger - electric guitar
- Ludovico Vagnone - acoustic guitar, electric guitar, Spanish guitar

== Production ==
- Sergio Castillo - record producer, musical arranger, musical direction, realization
- Francisco Amat - record producer, musical arranger, sound engineer, musical direction, realization
- Francisco Gude - sound engineer, mixing, drum engineering, piano engineering, recording
- Merv De Peyer - musical arranger, mixing
- Alfredo Bolona Jimenez - sound engineer, production assistant
- Julian Lowe - mastering
- Kepa Madrazo - production assistant
- Carlos Martin - graphic design, art direction
- Manu Araujo - stylist
- Luis Gómez-Escolar - adaptation

== Sources and external links ==
- Allmusic discography
- Discogs.com discography
- Rateyourmusic.com discography
