= Olé (Azúcar Moreno album) =

Studio album by Azúcar Moreno
- Released: 1998
- Recorded: 1998
- Genre: Pop
- Length: 45:32
- Label: Sony International
- Producer: Ricardo "Eddy" Martinez

Azúcar Moreno chronology
Mucho Azúcar - Grandes Éxitos (1997)	Olé (1998)	Amén (2000)

Olé is the ninth studio album by Spanish duo Azúcar Moreno, released on Sony International in 1998.

After the commercial success of the 1996 album Esclava De Tu Piel which had produced five hit singles followed by "Muévete Salvaje" from the 1997 hits compilation Mucho Azúcar - Grandes Éxitos, Azúcar Moreno teamed up with producer Ricardo "Eddy" Martinez in Miami again for the recording of 1998 album Olé. The album included further original material from Spanish singer Miguel Gallardo and Luis Cabañas, the team that had composed most of the singles on the preceding Esclava De Tu Piel, collaborations between Gallardo and David Ferrero and Pedro del Moral, songs by producer Richardo "Eddy" Martinez and it also saw one of the Salazar sisters, Encarna, making her debut as composer on the track "Dime Que Me Quieres". Production-wise Olé followed the winning combination of up-to-date club beats fused with flamenco and rock and contrasting R&B influenced ballads and rumbas, arrangement-wise the album differed slightly to its predecessor as it featured live strings on several titles. The album also closes with the acoustic "No Pretenderás", with instrumentation of just flamenco guitars and palmas - and a guest appearance by the duo's brothers Los Chunguitos.

The lead single was the title track "Olé", just like "Sólo Se Vive Una Vez" musically influenced by contemporary dance genres like reggaeton and dancehall but, as the title suggests, lyrically a tribute to the duo's native Spain. "Olé" was also released as two separate remix singles, the second entitled Olé - The Summer '99 Remixes featuring the track remixed and with additional production by renowned Latin remixer, DJ, music producer and arranger Pablo Flores, best known for being Gloria Estefan's personal remixer but also for having co-produced major hits for among others Madonna, Chayanne, Shakira and Ricky Martin. Flores' Club Mix of "Olé" was substantially rearranged from the original, not just by speeding up the tempo for the dancefloor but by adding new orchestration of brass, flamenco guitars and castanets to emphasize the song's lyrics and the track proved to be another big hit single for Azúcar Moreno in both Spain and Latin America.

The second single released and second big hit was "¡Mecachis!" ("Mechachis en la mar" a mildly profane expression, roughly translated as "Damnit!"), a midtempo dance track again written by Miguel Gallardo and Luis Cabañas and also issued with a series of dance remixes on the ¡Mechachis! - The Alabim-Bom-Ba-Remixes release, mixed by co-producers Pedro del Moral and David Ferrero.

Further hit singles from the album include the double A-side "Ese Beso"/"No Pretenderás".

While Olé didn't manage to match the extraordinary sales figures of the preceding Esclava De Tu Piel - half a million in Spain alone - it did sell some two-hundred thousand copies and was later awarded double platinum in Spain.

== Track listing ==
1. "Olé" (Pedro del Moral, David Ferrero, Miguel Gallardo) - 4:22
2. "¡Mecachis!" (Luis Cabañas, Miguel Gallardo) - 3:12
3. "Ande Yo Caliente" (Luis Cabañas, Miguel Gallardo) - 4:02
4. "Suave" (Yumitus) - 4:09
5. "Flamenco" (Pedro Rilo, César Valle) - 4:19
6. "Comeme la Piel a Besos" (F. Amat, Miguel Gallardo) - 3:42
7. "Dime Que Me Quieres" (Encarna Salazar, Cristo Jesús Montes Suárez) - 3:31
8. "Ese Beso" (Mercy Martinez, Ricardo "Eddy" Martinez) - 4:02
9. "Agua Que No Has De Beber" (David Ferrero, Miguel Gallardo, Pedro del Moral) - 4:39
10. "Cumbayá" (Luis Cabañas, Miguel Gallardo) - 3:53
11. "Apaga y Vamonos" (Mercy Martinez, Ricardo "Eddy" Martinez) - 3:20
12. "No Pretenderás" (Juan Salazar) - 2:21

== Personnel ==
- Azúcar Moreno - vocals
- Geannie Cruz - background vocals
- George Noriega - background vocals
- Wendy Pedersen - background vocals
- Rita Quintero - background vocals
- Raul Midón - background vocals
- Ramiro Teran - background vocals
- Ramón Huerta - programming
- Lee Levin - drums, percussion, programming
- Luis Cabañas - programming
- Eddie Montilla - programming
- Ricardo "Eddy" Martinez - programming
- Fernando Villar - programming
- Pedro del Moral - programming
- Elio DePalma - programming
- David Ferrero - programming
- Luis Enrique - percussion
- Julio Hernandez - bass guitar
- José Antonio Rodríguez - guitar
- Rene Toledo - guitar
- Angel Montejano - flamenco guitar
- Juan Antonio Salazar - flamenco guitar
- Jim Hacker - trumpet
- Arturo Sandoval - trumpet
- Tony Concepcion - trumpet
- Dana Teboe - trombone
- Ed Calle - baritone sax, soprano sax, tenor sax
- Miami Symphonic Services - strings
- Huifang Chen - violin
- Gustavo Correa - violin
- John DiPuccio - violin
- Rafael Elvira - violin
- Alfredo Oliva - violin
- Laszio Pap - violin
- Joan Faigen - violin
- Lionel Segal - violin
- Coral Tafoya - violin
- Mariusz Wojtowica - violin
- Yang Xi - viola
- Debbie Spring - viola
- David Chappell - viola
- Tim Barnes - viola
- David Cole - cello
- Chris Glansdorp - cello
- Claudio Jaffe - cello
- Robert Moore - cello

== Production ==
- Ricardo "Eddy" Martinez - record producer, musical arranger, musical director, orchestration
- José Luis de Carlos - executive producer
- José Antonio Rodríguez - musical arranger
- Juan Antonio Salazar - musical arranger
- Tony "Dr. Edit" Garcia - musical arranger
- Eddie Montilla - musical arranger
- Ramón Huerta - musical arranger
- Mike Couzzi - engineer, mixing
- Luis Carlos Esteban - engineer
- Jorge Ramirez - engineer
- Eric Schilling - engineer
- Sandra Vicente - engineer
- Jose Vinader - engineer
- Boris - engineer
- Kieran Wagner - assistant engineer
- Scott Kieklak - assistant engineer
- Mike Fuller - mastering
- Juanjo Manez - stylist
- Carlos Martin - graphic design

== Certifications ==
Region	Certification	Certified units/sales
Spain (PROMUSICAE)	2× Platinum	200,000^{^}
^{^} Shipments figures based on certification alone.

== Sources and external links ==
- Allmusic discography
- Discogs.com discography
- Rateyourmusic.com discography
