= Bailando Con Lola =

Studio album by Azúcar Moreno
- Released: May 2006
- Recorded: 2006
- Genre: Pop
- Label: EMI Music
- Producer: Adrián Posse

Azúcar Moreno chronology
Desde El Principio (2004)	Bailando Con Lola (2006)

Bailando Con Lola is the thirteenth studio album by Spanish duo Azúcar Moreno, released on EMI Music in 2006.

Professional ratings
Review scores
Source	Rating
Allmusic	

The album, which marked Azúcar Moreno's return to EMI Music after eighteen years with CBS Records/Epic Records/Sony Music, was recorded in Miami and again produced by one of the top names in Latin pop in the United States; Adrian Posse. Over the past twenty years Posse has worked both as composer, arranger and producer for a large number of stars, both in the Latin genre and internationally; Celine Dion, Luis Miguel, Carlos Santana, Christina Aguilera, Rod Stewart, Paul Anka, Thalía, Cristian Castro, Paulina Rubio, Ricardo Montaner, Lucero, Alejandra Guzmán, José José, Juan Gabriel, Rocío Dúrcal, Alexandre Pires, Pablo Montero and Mijares, among others.

Shortly before the release of the album in the Spring of 2006, Spanish TV station RTVE revealed that Azúcar Moreno were considered one of the top artists to represent Spain in that year's Eurovision Song Contest, held in Athens, Greece, sixteen years after the duo had their international breakthrough with "Bandido" in Zagreb, Yugoslavia, which finished fifth. Ultimately RTVE's choice fell upon Las Ketchup, feeling the sisters' tribute to legendary Spanish singer, dancer, and actress Lola Flores, the title track "Bailando con Lola" ("Dancing with Lola"), was too flamenco-flavoured, which proved to be a less than fortunate decision; Las Ketchup's song "Un Blodymary" finished 21st out of 24 participating entries in the Eurovision final.

Adrian Posse's production of the album fused Azúcar Moreno's flamenco with contemporary South American and Caribbean dance music genres like dancehall and reggaeton, most notably on tracks like "Clavame" and "Dreaming Contigo" but also on the updated re-recording of their 1990 hit "Ven Devórame Otra Vez", originally from breakthrough album Bandido. Both the title track and "Mil Velas" are featured in alternate versions as bonus tracks on the album; "Bailando Con Lola" as a slightly extended dance remix, and "Mil Velas" as a dramatic ethnic ballad. Bailando Con Lola was released as the Salazar sisters were celebrating their twentieth anniversary in the music business, and the album aptly opens with the track "20 Años" ("20 Years") with Toñi and Encarna singing: "It's been 20 years / Nothing else / 20 years of singing / And we've still got so much to give".

The album spawned two single releases, "Clavame""Bailando Con Lola"and "20 años", both however only issued as one track promo singles distributed to radio stations and disc jockeys, due to a diminishing single market. Just like the preceding Desde El Principio, the album was only a modest commercial success, selling some 50.000 copies in Spain, and just like 2002's Únicas the CD was also issued with EMI Group/Sony BMG Music Entertainment/Macrovision's Copy Control software.

In September 2008 it was officially announced that the duo had decided to go their separate ways professionally, and that Toñi Salazar instead would be pursuing a solo career. Twenty-four years after their debut with Con La Miel En Los Labios, and after having sold some two million albums in their native Spain alone, Bailando Con Lola consequently became the final Azúcar Moreno album.

== Track listing ==
1. "20 Años" (Posse, Gultiérrez, Paz) - 3:20
2. "Bailando con Lola" (Posse, Posse, Moscatelli) - 3:20
3. "Mil Velas" (Nilson) - 3:43
4. "Azúcar Amargo" (Posse, Gultiérrez, Paz) - 3:36
5. "Clávame" (Nilson, Moscatelli, Posse) - 3:25
6. "Luna" (Nilson) - 3:46
7. "Quitémonos La Ropa" (Estéfano, Reyes) - 3:40
8. "Dreaming Contigo" (Nilson) - 3:40
9. "Mil Velas" (Étnico) (Nilson) - 3:36
10. "Devórame Otra Vez" (Rodriguez) - 3:53
11. "Bailando con Lola" (Remix) (Posse, Posse, Moscatelli) - 4:31

== Personnel ==
- Azúcar Moreno - lead vocals

== Production ==
- Adrián Posse - record producer

== Sources and external links ==
- Allmusic discography
- Discogs.com discography
- Rateyourmusic.com discography
