= Estimúlame =

Studio album by Azúcar Moreno
- Released: 1986
- Recorded: 1986
- Genre: Pop
- Length: 33:54
- Label: EMI-Odeon
- Producer: Julio Palacios

Azúcar Moreno chronology
Con La Miel En Los Labios (1984)	Estimúlame (1986)	Carne De Melocotón (1988)

Estimúlame is the second studio album by Spanish duo Azúcar Moreno, released on the EMI-Odeon label in 1986. The album whose title translates as Stimulate Me and which just like the debut Con La Miel En Los Labios mainly combined flamenco with mainstream pop and included the single "Estimúlame" and two tracks with Los Chunguitos, "Azul, Azul" and "Barquito De Papel", was also a modest commercial success in Spain on its original release.

In 1992, after the duo had signed with Epic Records and had had their international breakthrough with the albums Bandido and Mambo, EMI's American subsidiary Capitol Records released the 20 track CD compilation Con La Miel En Los Labios, comprising both their debut album and Estimúlame.

In 2004 EMI's Dutch mid-price label Disky Records released the compilation Exitos Originales which included fourteen tracks from Con La Miel En Los Labios and Estimúlame. Another Disky compilation Le Diez De Azúcar Moreno included ten of the tracks.

In 2005 EMI released another compilation under the title Grandes a.k.a. Colleción Grandes a.k.a. Azúcar Moreno, Vive A Tu Manera Y Otros Exitos which again included ten tracks from these two albums.

== Track listing ==
Side A

1. "Corazón Herido (Porque Te Quiero)" (Luis Bara, Carlos Bara) - 3:50
2. "El Vino De Tu Boca" (Antonio Sanchez, José Luis Porras) - 3:03
3. "Azul, Azul" (M. Sanchez Pernia) (with Los Chunguitos) - 3:30
4. "Tu Me Pides" (J. Muñoz, J. M. Evoras) - 3:30
5. "Barquito De Papel" (Paulinho Gonzalez, José M. Moya) (with Los Chunguitos) - 3:01

Side B

1. "Estimúlame" (M. Sanchez Pernia) - 3:22
2. "Amor Prohibido" (R. Jimenez Barrull) - 3:02
3. "Ámame" (Antonio Sanchez) - 3:30
4. "El Molino Del Amor" (Juan Bautista) - 3:30
5. "Dale Ritmo" (Fernando Fuster, Luis Mendo) - 3:36

== Sources and external links ==
- Allmusic discography
- Discogs.com discography
- Rateyourmusic.com discography
