= Mucho Azúcar – Grandes Éxitos =

Mucho Azúcar - Grandes Éxitos

Greatest hits album by Azúcar Moreno
- Released: 1997
- Recorded: 1988–1997
- Genre: Pop
- Length: 57:40
- Label: Sony Music

Azúcar Moreno chronology
Esclava De Tu Piel (1996)	Mucho Azúcar - Grandes Éxitos (1997)	Olé (1998)

Professional ratings
Review scores
Source	Rating
Allmusic	4/5 stars

Mucho Azúcar – Grandes Éxitos is a greatest hits album by Spanish duo Azúcar Moreno, released on Sony International in 1997.

Following the success of 1996 album Esclava De Tu Piel and its string of hit singles Azúcar Moreno released their first career retrospective, Mucho Azúcar - Grandes Éxitos, (roughly translated as Lots of Sugar - Greatest Hits). The compilation covers their hits from 1988 through to 1997, thus excluding material from their first two albums recorded for EMI Music, starting with their Spanish breakthrough single "Debajo Del Olivo", the version used is however not the remixed house music hit version, subtitled Mix in Spain, later included on the remix albums Mix In Spain (1989) and The Sugar Mix Album (1990) but the original album version from 1988's Carne De Melocotón. Mucho Azúcar continues with four titles from their international breakthrough album Bandido including the title track "Bandido" with which they represented Spain in the Eurovision Song Contest 1990 in Zagreb, Yugoslavia and finished fifth, the follow-up "Ven Devórame Otra Vez", "Oye Cómo Va"/"Guajira" and "A Caballo". The 1991 album Mambo is represented by just two of the five singles released; the title track "Mambo" and "Tú Quieres Mas (Porque Te Amo)" - lead single "Torero!" is consequently omitted. "Hazme El Amor" is the only track from 1992's Ojos Negros, while the compilation features two tracks from 1994's El Amor; the title track "El Amor" which also appeared in the Hollywood movie The Specialist and "No Será Facil" and finally three tracks from the duo's at the time most recent album Esclava De Tu Piel, "Sólo Se Vive Una Vez", "Hoy Tengo Ganas De Ti" and the title track "Esclava De Tu Piel".

Mucho Azúcar also features one new recording, "Muévete Salvaje", originally recorded the previous year by fellow Sony act Cherokee. Just like Esclava De Tu Piel, "Muévete Salvaje" was produced by Ricardo "Eddy" Martinez and turned into another big hit single for the Salazar sisters. The single was released as two different editions, one as a double A-side with 1990's "Bandido" (some pressings mistakenly claim that the track is a new remix by Raúl Orellana - the version appearing on all editions is in fact the original album version). The second single was entitled Mucho Azúcar Remixes - Muévete Salvaje Y Otros Remixes and was an eight track E.P., including four versions of "Muévete Salvaje", the Radio Edit, the Hard Funk Mix, the Hard Core Flamenco Mix and the original Mucho Azúcar album version, plus "Oye Cómo Va"/"Guajiro" and "Debajo Del Olivo" - both remixes from The Sugar Mix Album, as well as "Hava Naguila" (Broken House Remix) and "Sólo Se Vive Una Vez" (Euroflam Mix).

While Sony Music have continued to release hits compilations with Azúcar Moreno all through the 2000s, such as Toda La Pasión De Azúcar Moreno (2001), Colección De Oro (2002), 20 Grandes Exitos (2003), Los Esenciales (2003) and 20 Exitos Originales (2005) as well as numerous mid-price collections, none of these include any new recordings or tracks not to be found on their three subsequent studio albums for the Sony label, several of the duo's greatest hits do however appear in edited form.

Mucho Azúcar - Grandes Éxitos was in 1999 re-released with slightly revised cover art but with the same track list under the title 20th Anniversary (1979-1999) as the Sony Latin label, originally CBS-Epic Latin, celebrated its 20th anniversary.

== Track listing ==
1. "Bandido" (J. L. Abel, Raúl Orellana, Jaime Stinus) - 3:00
  - From 1990 album Bandido
2. "Muevete Salvaje" (Ruiz) - 3:30
  - 1997 recording
3. "Mambo" (Single Edit) (Hector Almaguer, Garcia) - 3:46
  - From 1991 album Mambo
4. "No Será Fácil" (Gloria Estefan) - 4:20
  - From 1994 album El Amor
5. "A Caballo" ("El Carretero") (Guillermo Portabales) - 3:52
  - From 1990 album Bandido
6. "Debajo del Olivo" (J. Carmona, El Tijeritas) - 4:14
  - From 1988 album Carne De Melocotón
7. "Sólo Se Vive Una Vez" (Luis Cabañas, Miguel Gallardo) - 3:31
  - From 1996 album Esclava De Tu Piel
8. "Oye Como Va"/"Guajira" (Tito Puente) (José Areas, David Brown, Rico Reyes) - 3:40
  - From 1990 album Bandido
9. "Hoy Tengo Ganas de Ti" (Miguel Gallardo) - 4:09
  - From 1996 album Esclava De Tu Piel
10. "Ven Devórame Otra Vez" (Palmer Hernandez) - 5:35
  - From 1990 album Bandido
11. "Hazme el Amor" (Miguel Gallardo, Mole) - 4:22
  - From 1992 album Ojos Negros
12. "Tú Quieres Más (Porque Te Amo)" (Arroyo) - 4:25
  - From 1991 album Mambo
13. "El Amor" (Estefano, Enrique "Kike" Santander) - 4:52
  - From 1994 album El Amor
14. "Esclava de Tu Piel" (Luis Cabañas, Miguel Gallardo) - 3:09
  - From 1996 album Esclava De Tu Piel

== Personnel ==
- Azucar Moreno - vocals

== Production ==
- Luis Carlos Esteban - record producer ("Bandido")
- Emilio Estefan, Jr. - producer ("No Será Facil")
- Enrique "Kiki" Garcia - producer ("Mambo")
- Héctor R. Almaguer - producer ("Mambo")
- Ricardo "Eddy" Martinez ("Edito") - producer ("Muévete Salvaje", "Solo Se Vive Una Vez", "Hoy Tengo Ganas De Ti", "Esclava De Tu Piel")
- Julio Palacios - producer ("A Caballo", "Debajo Del Olivo", "Oye Como Va"/"Guajira", "Ven Devórame Otra Vez", "Tú Quieres Más (Porque Te Amo)")
- Nick Patrick - producer ("Hazme El Amor")
- David Revuelto - mastering
- Carlos Martin - art direction, design

== Certifications ==
Region	Certification	Certified units/sales
Spain (PROMUSICAE)	Gold	50,000^{^}
^{^} Shipments figures based on certification alone.

== Sources and external links ==
- Allmusic discography
- Discogs.com discography
- Rateyourmusic.com discography

Specific
