= Amén =

Studio album by Azúcar Moreno
- Released: 2000
- Recorded: 2000
- Genre: Pop
- Length: 51:55
- Label: Sony International
- Producer: Ricardo “Eddy” Martínez; Estéfano; Pumpin’ Dolls

Azúcar Moreno chronology
Olé (1998)	Amén (2000)	Únicas (2002)

Amén is the tenth studio album by Spanish duo Azúcar Moreno, released on Sony International in 2000.

Amén, entirely recorded in Miami, was coproduced by Estéfano, with whom the duo had collaborated on the 1994 album El Amor, and Ricardo “Eddy” Martínez who had produced their two preceding albums Esclava de tu piel and Olé and also the track “Muévete salvaje” on their 1997 greatest hits compilation Mucho Azúcar - Grandes Éxitos. Six of the album's thirteen titles, “Amén”, “Abracadabra”, “Mamma mia”, “Tururú”, “40 kilos de besos”, “Amigo mío” and “Viva la vida”, were written or co-written by Spanish singer and composer Miguel Gallardo, who previously had penned hits like “Hazme el amor”, “Desnúdate, desnúdame”, “A galope”, “Solo se vive una vez”, “Hoy tengo ganas de ti” and “Esclava de tu piel” for the Salazar sisters.

The lead single from the album was “Mamma mia” —not to be confused with the ABBA song with the same title— followed by the title track “Amén”, “Ay amor”, “Dale que dale” and the ballad “Piel de seda”, the latter written by prolific Spanish composer José Luis Perales. The track “San José” was co-produced by Spanish remix team Pumpin’ Dolls, who previously had remixed worldwide hits like Cher’s “Strong Enough”, TLC’s “Unpretty” and Carlos Santana’s “María María”. The track “Abracadabra”, the third single from the album, was along with “Juramento” featured in Spanish movie Gitano, starring famous flamenco dancer Joaquín Cortés. “Mamma Mia”, “Amén” and “Abracadabra” were all released in a wide variety of extended dance mixes, mixed by among others Pedro del Moral, David Ferrero and Pablo Flores.

Amén continued the Salazar sisters’ series of successful albums, selling some 300.000 copies in Spain alone and achieving triple platinum status.

Amén was the first Azúcar Moreno album to be accompanied by a DVD release, entitled Amén Tour. The documentary captures the Salazar sisters touring Spain, Portugal, The Azores, Bulgaria, South America and it also features behind the scenes footage from the making of the videos “Mamma mia”, “Amén”, “Abracadabra” and “Hoy tengo ganas de ti” from their previous album Esclava de tu piel, the latter filmed in New York.

== Track listing ==
1. “Amén” (Caba, Gallardo) – 3:36
2. “Abracadabra” (Gallardo) – 3:50
3. “Mamma mia” (Fano) – 4:17
4. “El amor se echa de menos” (Fano) – 4:48
5. “Tururú” (Caba, Gallardo) – 3:44
6. “Piel de seda” (Perales) – 4:33
7. “Juramento” (Rilo) – 3:33
8. “Dale que dale” (Alonso, Castro, Flores, Salazar) – 3:59
9. “Ay amor” (Donato, Fano) – 4:28
10. “40 kilos de besos” (Caba, Gallardo) – 4:14
11. “San José” (Gypsy Dance version) (Arana, Belmonte) – 3:51
12. “Amigo mío” (Gallardo) – 3:14
13. “Viva la vida” (Gallardo) – 3:47

== Personnel ==
- Azúcar Moreno – vocals

Production

- Ricardo “Eddy” Martínez – record producer
- Estéfano – producer
- Pumpin’ Dolls – co-producers "San José" (Gypsy Dance Version)

== Certifications and sales ==
Region	Certification	Certified units/sales
Spain (PROMUSICAE)	3× Platinum	300,000^{^}
^{^} Shipments figures based on certification alone.

== Sources and external links ==
- Allmusic discography
- Discogs.com discography
- Rateyourmusic.com discography

Specific
