= Con La Miel En Los Labios =

- Original cover art

Studio album by Azúcar Moreno
- Released: 1984
- Recorded: 1984
- Genre: Pop
- Length: 34:14 (1992 re-issue 68:08)
- Label: EMI-Odeon
- Producer: Julio Palacios

Azúcar Moreno chronology
Con La Miel En Los Labios (1984)	Estimúlame (1986)

Alternative cover
- 1992 CD re-issue

Professional ratings
Review scores
Source	Rating
Allmusic	

Con La Miel En Los Labios is the debut album by Spanish duo Azúcar Moreno, released on the EMI-Odeon label in 1984. The album, whose title translates as With Honey On The Lips, and which mainly combined flamenco with mainstream pop, included the singles "Azúcar Moreno", "Que Si, Que and "Canela", all of which met with moderate commercial success in Spain on their original release.

In 1992, after the duo had signed with Epic Records and had had their international breakthrough with the albums Bandido and Mambo, EMI's American subsidiary, Capitol Records re-released Con La Miel En Los Labios worldwide as a 20 track CD compilation comprising both the original album and the 1986 follow-up Estimúlame.

In 2004, EMI's Dutch mid-price label, Disky Records released the compilation Exitos Originales, which included fourteen tracks from the duo's first two albums. This was followed by Le Diez De Azúcar Moreno, again released by Disky and including ten of the tracks.

In 2005, EMI released another compilation under the title Grandes a.k.a. Colleción Grandes a.k.a. Azúcar Moreno, Vive A Tu Manera Y Otros Exitos, which again included ten tracks from these two early albums.

== Track listing ==
=== Original album ===
Side A

1. "Canela" (J. De Juan, M. Aguilar, Josemi) - 3:26
2. "Luna Coqueta" (J. R. Garcia Florez, A. Marcos) - 3:46
3. "Más Al Sur" (Fernando Marquez) - 3:29
4. "Porque Te Quiero" (Pepe De Lucia) - 3:03
5. "El Girasol (Dime Si Me Quieres)" (J. R. Garcia Florez, A. Marcos) - 3:31

Side B

1. "Azúcar Moreno" (Sergio Makaroff, Ariel Rot) - 3:58
2. "Rumba En El Barrio" (J. De Juan, M. Aguilar) - 3:19
3. "Que Si, Que No" (J. Carrasco, F. Lopez) - 3:00
4. "No Quiero Que Me Quieras" (Fernando Marquez) - 3:22
5. "Baila Moreno" (José Ma. Cano) - 3:20

=== 1992 CD re-issue ===
1. "Corazón Herido (Porque Te Quiero)" (Luis Bara, Carlos Bara) - 3:50
2. "El Vino De Tu Boca" (Antonio Sanchez, José Luis Porras) - 3:03
3. "Azul, Azul" (M. Sanchez Pernia) (with Los Chunguitos) - 3:30
4. "Tu Me Pides" (J. Muñoz, J. M. Evoras) - 3:30
5. "Barquito De Papel" (Paulinho Gonzalez, José M. Moya) (with Los Chunguitos) - 3:01
6. "Estimúlame" (M. Sanchez Pernia) - 3:22
7. "Amor Prohibido" (R. Jimenez Barrull) - 3:02
8. "Ámame" (Antonio Sanchez) - 3:30
9. "El Molino Del Amor" (Juan Bautista) - 3:30
10. "Dale Ritmo" (Fernando Fuster, Luis Mendo) - 3:36
11. "Canela" (J. De Juan, M. Aguilar, Josemi) - 3:26
12. "Luna Coqueta" (J. R. Garcia Florez, A. Marcos) - 3:46
13. "Más Al Sur" (Fernando Marquez) - 3:29
14. "Porque Te Quiero" (Pepe De Lucia) - 3:03
15. "El Girasol (Dime Si Me Quieres)" (J. R. Garcia Florez, A. Marcos) - 3:31
16. "Azúcar Moreno" (Sergio Makaroff, Ariel Rot) - 3:58
17. "Rumba En El Barrio" (J. De Juan, M. Aguilar) - 3:19
18. "Que Si, Que No" (J. Carrasco, F. Lopez) - 3:00
19. "No Quiero Que Me Quieras" (Fernando Marquez) - 3:22
20. "Baila Moreno" (José Ma. Cano) - 3:20
  - Tracks 1–10 from 1986 album Estimúlame
  - Tracks 11–20 from 1984 album Con La Miel En Los Labios

== Sources and external links ==
- Allmusic discography
- Discogs.com discography
- Rateyourmusic.com discography
