= Esclava De Tu Piel =

Studio album by Azúcar Moreno
- Released: 1996
- Recorded: 1996
- Genre: Pop
- Length: 38:38
- Label: Sony International
- Producer: Ricardo "Eddy" Martinez

Azúcar Moreno chronology
| El Amor (1994) | Esclava De Tu Piel (1996) | Mucho Azúcar - Grandes Éxitos (1997) |

Alternative cover
- Re-release Latin Stars

Esclava De Tu Piel (English: Slave to Your Skin) is the eighth studio album by Spanish duo Azúcar Moreno, released on Sony International in 1996. The album includes the duo's biggest hit single to date, "Solo Se Vive Una Vez" ("You Only Live Once").

Esclava De Tu Piel was entirely recorded in the United States and was produced by one of Gloria Estefan and Emilio Estefan Jr.'s longtime collaborators, arranger and producer Ricardo "Eddy" Martinez (a.k.a. Edito). Martinez has worked with some of the biggest names in the world of Latin music besides Estefan and Miami Sound Machine, such as Chayanne, Yolandita Monge, Lissette, Luis Miguel, Javier Garcia, Malú, Paloma San Basilio, Arturo Sandoval, Ilan Chester, Latin Majik, Francesca Cezan and many others. After two albums in the mainstream Latin pop genre, Ojos Negros (1992) and El Amor (1994), which had become their breakthrough on the South American and U.S. markets respectively, but which only had been moderate commercial successes compared to Bandido (1990) and Mambo (1991) in their native Spain, Martinez' production of Esclava De Tu Piel was a return to a more up-to-date, dancefloor oriented and altogether rougher soundscape, the prime example being the title track "Esclava De Tu Piel" which combined heavy dance beats with distorted guitars and toasting by American Salsa singer Roberto Blades.

The lead single released from the album was the dancehall influenced "Solo Se Vive Una Vez", written by Spanish singer Miguel Gallardo and Luis Cabañas, promoted by a slightly controversial genderswapping music video showing the Salazar sisters both as themselves and in other scenes in typical male attire such as pin-striped suits with slicked back hair and smoking cigars - and in turn one of their male dancers both as himself and as a drag queen. The song was released in a wide variety of dance remixes, issued on two separate singles entitled The Mediterranean Remixes and The Caribbean Remixes. "Solo Se Vive Una Vez" became a major hit in the summer of 1996, topping the charts both in Spain and several countries in South and Central America, and has since served as one of Azúcar Moreno's signature tunes. In the 2000s the track was included on the first Spanish language editions of karaoke video game SingStar.

The follow-up proved to be another of Azúcar Moreno's highest charting singles; "Hoy Tengo Ganas De Ti" (translated: "Today I Desire You"), originally one of Miguel Gallardo's biggest hits and first recorded in 1975, but then as a dramatic ballad. The duo's version was again notably different from the original, turning it into a modern dance anthem with rough guitars. The promo video was shot in New York and shows the sisters performing the song in the streets of the city as well as on top of skyscrapers. The following single release was the title track "Esclava De Tu Piel", which turned into their third big hit single in a row, and the track was also issued in remixed form on a release entitled The Slave Mixes. Esclava De Tu Piel was also Azúcar Moreno's first album to incorporate influences from the Middle East; the fourth single was a radically reworked flamenco/rock/dance cover of the traditional "Hava Nagila", sung entirely in Hebrew with a men's choir. Just like the preceding singles the track was available in a large number of dance remixes, issued on the Hava Naguila - The Middle Eastern Remixes release. The chart success of the album and its singles even resulted in a fifth single being released in Spain, Pedro Rilo's flamenco flavoured "Bandolero".

As a contrast to the album's dance tracks it also featured a few R&B flavoured ballads, such as "Enreda", composed by acclaimed British hitmaker Albert Hammond and originally recorded in both Spanish and English, then as "Tangled Up In Tears", by Hammond himself in 1976, and later also covered by Leo Sayer. Further mid-tempo tracks include "Tapame", written by Sevillan singer-songwriter Luis del Estad, a cover of Willie Gonzalez' romantic salsa "Ámame Toda La Noche", Alejandro Jaen's "La Cita" and the album closes with Cordoban flamenco singer Manuel Ruiz Queco's "Tiritatando".

Esclava De Tu Piel remains the bestselling album of Azúcar Moreno's career to date, having sold some five hundred thousand copies in Spain alone and thus certified five times platinum. In the United States the album reached #43 on Billboard's Top Latin Albums chart. The duo's first greatest hits album, Mucho Azúcar - Grandes Éxitos, followed in 1997 and then included "Solo Se Vive Una Vez", "Hoy Tengo Ganas De Ti" and "Esclava De Tu Piel". The Esclava De Tu Piel album itself was re-released with slightly revised cover art by Sony Music in 1998 under the title Latin Stars.

== Track listing ==
1. "Solo Se Vive Una Vez" (Luis Cabañas, Miguel Gallardo) - 3:31
2. "La Cita" (Alejandro Jaen) - 4:24
3. "Hoy Tengo Ganas de Ti" (Miguel Gallardo) - 4:09
4. "Enreda" (Albert Hammond, Oscar Gómez) - 3:38
5. "Hava Naguila" (Traditional, arrangement D. Carrasco, S. Juan, J. Bola, M. Maguesin, J.A. Rodriquez) - 3:21
6. "Esclava de Tu Piel" (Luis Cabañas, Miguel Gallardo) - 3:09
7. "Ámame Toda la Noche" (Alejandro Montalban) - 3:57
8. "Bandolero" (Pedro Rilo) - 3:35
9. "Tápame" (Prelude) (Rafael DelEstad) - 0:48
10. "Tápame" (Rafael DelEstad) - 4:31
11. "Tiritatando" (Manuel Ruiz "Queco") - 4:06

== Personnel ==
- Azúcar Moreno - vocals
- Carlos Salazar - vocals
- George Noriega - choir, chorus
- Wendy Pedersen - choir, chorus
- Rita Quintero - choir, chorus
- Raul Midón - choir, chorus
- Roberto Blades - rap
- Ramón Huerta - keyboards, programming
- Eddie Montilla - programming
- Ricardo Eddy Martinez - keyboards, programming
- Luis Enrique - percussion
- Lee Levin - drum programming, percussion
- Ernesto Luke - drum programming, percussion
- Rene Toledo - acoustic guitar, guitar, electric guitar
- José Antonio Rodríguez - flamenco guitar
- Ahmed Barroso - electric guitar
- Kiki Maya - flamenco guitar, rhythm guitar
- Julio Hermández - bass guitar
- Tony Concepcion - trumpet
- Arturo Sandoval - trumpet
- Ed Calle - baritone sax, tenor sax
- Dana Teboe - trombone

== Production ==
- Ricardo Eddy Martinez - record producer
- Lee Levin - musical arranger
- Eddie Montilla - musical arranger
- Rene Toledo - musical arranger
- Ramón Huerta - musical arranger
- Recorded at Criteria Recording Studios (Miami), additional recordings at Sinfonia (Madrid)´
- Carlos Martin - cover art, design
- Zaibi - photography
- Juanjo Manez - stylist

== Certifications ==
| Region | Certification | Certified units/sales |
|---|---|---|
| Spain (Promusicae) | 3× Platinum | 300,000^{^} |
^{^} Shipments figures based on certification alone.

== Sources and external links ==
- Allmusic discography
- Discogs.com discography
- Rateyourmusic.com discography
