= The Sugar Mix Album =

Remix album by Azúcar Moreno
- Released: 1990
- Recorded: 1988, 1989, 1990
- Genre: Pop
- Length: 36:31
- Label: CBS-Epic
- Producer: Julio Palacios; José Luis Esteban; Raúl Orellana

Azúcar Moreno chronology
Bandido (1990)	The Sugar Mix Album (1990)	Mambo (1991)

The Sugar Mix Album is the second remix album by Spanish duo Azúcar Moreno, released on CBS-Epic in late 1990.

Following the duo's international breakthrough in 1990 with the Eurovision Song Contest entry "Bandido" and the album with the same title they released their second remix collection including the 12" versions of the singles "A Caballo", "Bandido", "Oye Como Va" / "Guajira" and "Ven Devórame Otra Vez". Just like the preceding Mix In Spain the album juxtaposed the Salazár sisters' typical flamenco vocal style against contemporary dance arrangements which drew heavily on influences from genres like house music, acid house, hip hop, R&B and rap. The Puerto Rico Mix of "Oye Como Va" / "Guajira" was the duo's first collaboration with acknowledged American remix producer Pablo Flores, best known for his work with Gloria Estefan. Flores would go on to remix several of Azúcar Moreno's hits later in the 1990s and 2000s. The Sugar Mix Album also featured two mixes previously included on the Mix In Spain album; "Debajo Del Olivo" (Mix In Spain) and "Aunque Me Falte El Aire" (Lerele Mix), both originally from their third studio album Carne De Melocotón.

The Sugar Mix Album was released on vinyl, cassette and CD in most parts of the world but is out of print in all formats since the early 2000s.

== Track listing ==
Side A

1. "A Caballo" (Dance Mix) - 6:07
  - Original version appears on 1990 album Bandido
2. "Bandido" (Deep Mix) - 5:42
  - Original version appears on 1990 album Bandido
3. "Debajo Del Olivo" (Mix In Spain) - 6:07
  - Original version appears on 1988 album Carne De Melocotón

Side B

1. "Oye Como Va" / "Guajira" (Puerto Rico Mix) - 7:00
  - Original version appears on 1990 album Bandido
2. "Ven Devórame Otra Vez" (Miami Mix) - 6:02
  - Original version appears on 1990 album Bandido
3. "Aunque Me Falte El Aire" (Lerele Mix) - 5:33
  - Original version appears on 1988 album Carne De Melocotón

== Personnel ==
- Azúcar Moreno - vocals
- Michael W. Richards - keyboards and additional percussion "Ven Devórame Otra Vez" (Miami Mix)

== Production ==
- Julio Palacios - record producer
- José Luis Esteban - record producer
- Raúl Orellana - record producer
- R.S.P (Rebeldes Sin Pausa) - remix and additional production "Debajo Del Olivo" (Mix In Spain) & "Aunque Me Falte El Aire" (Lerele Mix)
- Pablo Flores - remix and additional production "Oye Como Va" / "Guajira" (Puerto Rico Mix)
- Javier García - remix and additional production "Oye Como Va" / "Guajira" (Puerto Rico Mix)
- Victor De Persia - remix "Ven Devorame Otra Vez" (Miami Mix)
