= Miriam Sandler =

American singer and dancer

- Born: Miriam Mandelkern; New York City, New York
- Origin: Clifton, New Jersey
- Genres: Jewish music, dance-pop, Latin pop
- Occupations: Singer, dancer
- Years active: 1991–present
- Labels: Epic, SBK
- Website: miriamsandler.com

Miriam Sandler (née Mandelkern) is an American singer and dancer. She was a prolific backup singer during the 1990s for Latin pop artists like Jon Secada and Gloria Estefan before becoming a baalas teshuva. As a religious singer, she released her debut solo album, The Solution, in 2008.

== Biography ==
=== Early life ===
Miriam Mandelkern was born in New York City to a secular Jewish family and moved to Miami, Florida when she was five. She is of Cuban descent. In high school, she performed with vocal groups and vocal jazz ensembles.

She attended the University of Miami as a music major. One of her teachers, Jon Secada, then a backup singer for Gloria Estefan, encouraged her in her singing career and recommended her for several jobs.

=== Secular music career ===
Sandler began her career singing jingles for Spanish-language TV and radio commercials. She then worked in the Latin pop industry as a backup singer for artists like Secada, Gloria Estefan, Julio Iglesias, and Fito Páez, and sang on albums by James Brown and Michael McDonald. Her touring with Estefan included a White House special event for George H. W. Bush, a Royal Command Performance for the Queen of the United Kingdom, and a concert for Cuban refugees at Guantanamo Bay Naval Base. She also appeared on the Late Show with David Letterman.

=== Return to Judaism and solo career ===
Shortly before going on a world tour with Estefan, Sandler learned that her father had been diagnosed with pancreatic cancer and given three to six months to live, and she withdrew from the tour to care for him. During this time, she and her father began attending Conservative and Reform synagogues. At the time, she had prior exposure to Orthodoxy from her older sister, who had become a baalas teshuva and moved to Israel. Following her father's death, she studied with Rabbi Rafael Marlowe of Talmudic University of Florida. She spent eight months at Neve Yerushalayim seminary in Israel, during which time she was introduced to and performed with the all-female band Tofa'ah.

Sandler released a cassette tape called Almondseed in 2000, followed by the EP Finally Found You in 2004. Her debut full-length album, The Solution, was released in 2008. She was a presenter at the annual ATARA Arts for Women Conference in 2009 and 2016.

== Discography ==
=== Albums ===
- Almondseed (2000) (cassette tape; as Miriam Mandelkern)
- Finally Found You EP (2004)
- The Solution (2008)

=== Compilation appearances ===
- Michele "Rockin' Rebbetzin" Garner, The Kol Isha Show Volume 1 (2000) ("Thank You")

=== Other credits ===
- James Brown, Love Over-Due (1991, Scotti Brothers) (backing vocals)
- Roberto Perera, Passions, Illusions and Fantasies (1991, Heads Up International) (vocals)
- Roberto Perera, Dreams & Desires (1992, Heads Up) (vocals)
- Jon Secada, Si Te Vas/Heart, Soul & a Voice (1994, SBK) (backing vocals)
- Raúl di Blasio, Piano de America, Vol. 2 (1994) (vocals)
- Azúcar Moreno, El Amor (1994, Epic/Sony International) (vocals on "El Amor")
- Cheito, Cheito (1994, Epic) (choir/chorus)
- José Luis Rodríguez, Razones Para Una Sonrisa (1994, Sony) (backing vocals, choir)
- Julio Iglesias, La Carretera (1995, Columbia) (vocals)
- Fito Páez, Rey Sol (2001, Warner Music Group) (vocals)
- Gian Marco Zignago, A Tiempo (2002, Sony) (choir)
