= El Amor =

Canciones de Amor may refer to:

- "El Amor" (Tito El Bambino song), a 2009 song by Tito El Bambino
- "El Amor" (Ricardo Arjona song), a 2011 song by Ricardo Arjona
- El Amor (Julio Iglesias album), 1975
- El Amor (Azúcar Moreno album), 1994
- El Amor (Gloria Trevi album), 2015
