= Nací Para Cantar =

Studio album by Lalo Rodríguez
- Released: 1994
- Genre: Salsa
- Label: EMI Latin

Lalo Rodríguez chronology
De Vuelta en la Trampa (1992)	Nací Para Cantar (1994)	Estoy Aquí (1996)

Nací Para Cantar (I Was Born to Sing) is a studio album by Lalo Rodríguez released by EMI Latin in 1994. The album, which was produced by Harvey Averne, earned an RIAA platinum record and a 3M Visionary Award.

== Track listing ==
No.	Title	Writer(s)	Length
1.	"Esta Noche Dormire Contigo"	Lalo Rodríguez	4:55
2.	"Acusado Falsamente"	Lalo Rodríguez	5:20
3.	"Aunque Lo Dudes"	Omar Alfanno	5:18
4.	"Que Quieres Que Piense"	Johnny Ortiz	5:04
5.	"Entregate"	Lalo Rodríguez, Jaime Torres	5:18
6.	"Vivamos Este Amor"	Lalo Rodríguez, Rafael Rodríguez	5:36
7.	"Confusion"	Lalo Rodríguez	4:45
8.	"Mi Corazon Quedo Vacio"	Lalo Rodríguez	5:22
