= Estoy Aquí (album) =

Studio album by Lalo Rodríguez
- Released: 1996
- Genre: Salsa
- Label: EMI Latin

Lalo Rodríguez chronology
Nací Para Cantar (1994)	Estoy Aquí (1996)	Con Todo Mi Corazon (unreleased)

Estoy Aquí (I'm Here) is a studio album by Lalo Rodríguez released in 1996. It is the final studio album released by Rodríguez, as his album Con Todo Mi Corazon, originally set to be released in March 2013, was completed but never publicly released.

== Track listing ==
No.	Title	Writer(s)	Length
1.	"Jamas Olvides"	Omar Alfanno	5:01
2.	"Y Soy Feliz"	Gloria González	4:35
3.	"Lo Voy a Lograr"	Raldy Vázquez	4:06
4.	"Medley Boleros (Matiz de Amor/Sin Ti)"	Pepe Guízar, Sylvia Rexach	4:44
5.	"Vivo Amandote"	Giovanny Jiménez	4:24
6.	"Lo Hice"	Lou Briel	4:06
7.	"Yo Quiero Amarte Toda"	Giovanny Jiménez	4:47
8.	"Ni Un Dia Mas"	Omar Alfanno	5:08
