= Un Nuevo Despertar =

Studio album by Lalo Rodríguez
- Released: 1988
- Genre: Salsa
- Label: Rodven Records

Lalo Rodríguez chronology
Punto y Coma (1987)	Un Nuevo Despertar (1988)	Sexsacional..! (1989)

Un Nuevo Despertar (A New Awakening) is a studio album by Lalo Rodríguez released in 1988. Continuing the tradition of the salsa romántica, Rodríguez also added in sexual songs known as salsa erótica which was short-lived.

== Singles ==
The album produced three singles that charted on the Billboard Hot Latin Tracks.

- "Ven, devórame otra vez" ("Come, Devour Me Again") was the first single released from the album. The song displays an example of the salsa erotica-style songs. The song charted #10 on the Hot Latin Tracks.
- "Sí, te mentí" ("Yes, I Lied to You") was the second single released from the album and charted #12 on the Hot Latin Tracks.
- "Voy a escarbar tu cuerpo" ("I Will Dig Through Your Body") was the third single released from the album and charted #23 on the Hot Latin Tracks.

== Track listing ==
No.	Title	Writer(s)	Length
1.	"Ven, Devórame Otra Vez"	Palmer Hernandez	5:11
2.	"Si, Te Mentí"	Anibal Pastor	4:55
3.	"Voy a Escarbar Tu Cuerpo"	Mario Díaz	3:55
4.	"Te Estoy Pidiendo"	Corinne Oviedo	4:35
5.	"Tú Ni Te Piensas"	Corinne Oviedo	4:32
6.	"Despues de Hacer el Amor"	Elio Roca, V. Planas	4:33
7.	"Tú Iluminas"	Antonio de Jesus	4:24
8.	"No Te Voy a Defraudar"	Corinne Oviedo	4:52

== Personnel ==
- Trombone - Antonio Vazquez
- Composer - Aníbal Pastor
- Composer - Corinne Oviedo
- Arranger - Cuto Soto
- Composer - Elio Roca
- Arranger, Baritone Saxophone - Ernesto Sanchez
- Producer - Frank Torres
- Background Vocals - Hecor Perez
- Congas - Jimmy Morales
- Mixing, Producer, Recording Director - Julio Cesar Delgado
- Primary Artist, Vocals, Background Vocals - Lalo Rodríguez
- Composer - Mario Diaz
- Background Vocals - Nino Segarra
- Composer - Palmer Hernandez
- Bass - Pedro Pérez
- Keyboards - Ramon B. Sanchez
- French Horn - Roberto Rivera
- Timbales - Santiago "Chago" Martínez
- Arranger - Tommy Villarini
- Composer - Uvaldo Rodriguez
- Trumpet - Vicente Cusi Castillo
- Piano - Willie Sotelo
- Trumpet - Ángel "Angie" Machado

== Chart position ==
Year	Chart	Album	Peak
1988	U.S. Billboard Tropical/Salsa	Un nuevo despertar	1

== Awards ==
Un nuevo despertar was given the first Premio Lo Nuestro award for "Tropical Album of the Year" in 1989.

== Reception ==
Professional ratings
Review scores
Source	Rating
Allmusic	3/5 stars

José A. Estévez Jr. of Allmusic gave the album a mixed his efforts on the album a "lackluster production" despite its commercial success.

== See also ==
- List of number-one Billboard Tropical Albums from the 1980s
