= Punto y Coma =

Studio album by Lalo Rodríguez
- Released: 1987
- Genre: Salsa
- Label: Hi-Yield Records

Lalo Rodríguez chronology
El Niño, el Hombre, el Soñador, el Loco (1985)	Punto y Coma (1987)	Un Nuevo Despertar (1988)

Re-release cover
- 1992 re-release under the title Como Siempre Lalo

Punto y Coma (Period & Comma) is a studio album by Lalo Rodríguez released in 1987, following the success of his previous album, El Niño, el Hombre, el Soñador, el Loco. The album was re-released in 1992 as Como Siempre Lalo.

== Track listing ==
No.	Title	Writer(s)	Length
1.	"La Promesa de Dios"	Lalo Rodríguez	5:36
2.	"Patrimonio Nacional"	Johnny Ortiz	5:53
3.	"El Millonario Bobo"	Harry Suarez	5:46
4.	"Verte Reir"	Harry Suarez	4:59
5.	"Que Mentira"	Lalo Rodríguez	3:42
6.	"Te Vi Llorar"	Lalo Rodríguez	5:53
7.	"Tranquilizante Musical"	Johnny Ortiz	4:24
