= El Niño, el Hombre, el Soñador, el Loco =

Studio album by Lalo Rodríguez
- Released: 1985
- Genre: Salsa, plena, bomba
- Label: Discos Cultura

Lalo Rodríguez chronology
| Nuevamente... Lalo (1982) | El Niño, el Hombre, el Soñador, el Loco (1985) | Punto y Coma (1987) |

Re-release cover
- 1991 re-release under the title ¡Plena-Mente, Lalo!

El Niño, el Hombre, el Soñador, el Loco (The Boy, the Man, the Dreamer, the Crazy One) is a studio album by Lalo Rodríguez released in 1985. This album is different from his previous two albums in that it focuses on Puerto Rico's folkloric music styles, including plena and bomba.

The album was re-released as ¡Plena-Mente, Lalo! in 1991. The reissue title translates in as Completely, Lalo!, and is a pun on Rodriguez's use of plena music.

== Track listing ==
| No. | Title | Writer(s) | Length |
|---|---|---|---|
| 1. | "El Niño, el Hombre, el Soñador, el Loco" | Lalo Rodríguez | 7:53 |
| 2. | "Cuando Tu Estas a Mi Lado" | Lalo Rodríguez | 5:25 |
| 3. | "Semilla de Cultura" | Lalo Rodríguez | 4:00 |
| 4. | "Libre" | Lalo Rodríguez | 7:10 |
| 5. | "Aristocracia/Zangano o Bufon" | Lalo Rodríguez | 9:50 |
