= Ven, Devórame Otra Vez =

1988 single by Lalo Rodríguez

"Ven, devórame otra vez"

Single by Lalo Rodríguez

from the album Un nuevo despertar
- Released: 1988
- Genre: Salsa
- Length: 5:11
- Label: Rodven Records
- Songwriter: Palmer Hernández

Lalo Rodríguez singles chronology
"Sí, te mentí" (1988)	"Ven, devórame otra vez" (1988)	"Voy a escarbar tu cuerpo" (1988)

"Ven, devórame otra vez (English: Come, Devour Me Again) is the lead single from Lalo Rodríguez's album, Un nuevo despertar. The song with lyrics by Dominican songwriter Palmer Hernández is noted for its sexual content at the time of the salsa romantica era. The song reached number ten on the Billboard Hot Latin Tracks chart. At the first Premio Lo Nuestro awards in 1989, the song was awarded "Tropical Song of the Year". It was listed on Billboard's "15 Best Salsa Songs Ever" in 2018.

== Chart performance ==
Chart (1988)	Peak position
US Billboard Hot Latin Tracks	10

== Azúcar Moreno version ==
"Ven, devórame otra vez"

Single by Azucar Moreno

from the album Bandido
- Released: 1990
- Genre: Latin pop
- Length: 5:34
- Label: CBS-Epic
- Songwriter: Palmer Hernández

Azucar Moreno singles chronology
"Bandido" (1990)	"Ven, devórame otra vez" (1990)	"Mambo" (1990)

In 1990, Spanish female-duo, Azúcar Moreno covered the song from their album, Bandido. This version peaked at No. 9 on the Hot Latin Tracks chart in September 1990.

=== Chart performance ===
Chart (1990)	Peak position
Panama (UPI)	10
Uruguay (UPI)	1
US Hot Latin Tracks (Billboard)	9

== Charlie Cruz version ==
"Ven, devórame otra vez"

Single by Charlie Cruz featuring Melissa

from the album Como nunca
- Released: 2005
- Recorded: 2004
- Genre: Salsa
- Length: 4:02
- Label: Sony Music Entertainment
- Songwriter: Palmer Hernández

Charlie Cruz featuring Melissa singles chronology
"Grita conmigo" (2004)	"Ven, devórame otra vez" (2005)	"Déjala que baile" (2006)

In 2004, Charlie Cruz covered "Ven, devórame otra vez" on his album, Como nunca. This version peaked at No. 10 on the Latin Tropical Airplay chart.

== Shakira and Jonathan Enrique version ==
"Ven Devórame Otra Vez"

Song by Shakira, Jonathan Enrique
- Released: 2023
- Recorded: 2023
- Genre: Salsa
- Length: 1:06
- Label: Miami Moon
- Songwriter: Palmer Hernández

Music video
- "Ven Devórame Otra Vez" on YouTube

In August 2023, Shakira and Jonathan Enrique covered a one-minute excerpt of "Ven Devórame Otra Vez" for a Sabritas potato chips commercial. The commercial features Shakira singing the duet with an animated sandwich voiced by Enrique. In October 2023, the song was made available on streaming platforms.

== See also ==
- List of best-selling Latin singles
