= Nuevamente... Lalo =

Studio album by Lalo Rodríguez
- Released: 1982
- Genre: Salsa
- Label: Global Records

Lalo Rodríguez chronology
Simplemente... Lalo (1980)	Nuevamente... Lalo (1982)	El Niño, el Hombre, el Soñador, el Loco (1985)

Nuevamente... Lalo (Again... Lalo) is a studio album by Lalo Rodríguez released by Global Records in 1982. The sequel to his debut album, Simplemente... Lalo contains songs written by Rodríguez himself, as well as by Tite Curet Alonso. It was re-released as Una Voz Para Escuchar in 1990.

== Track listing ==
No.	Title	Writer(s)	Length
1.	"Yo No Soy Pilon de Machacar"	Tite Curet Alonso	5:44
2.	"Recuerdo Escolar"	Lalo Rodríguez	4:58
3.	"Cariño Mio"	Lalo Rodríguez	7:04
4.	"Se Empeñan"	Lalo Rodríguez	5:35
5.	"Virgencita de la Mar"	Lalo Rodríguez	6:10
6.	"Lo Que Fuiste Para Mi"	Lalo Rodríguez	3:42
7.	"Perico Diaz"	Tite Curet Alonso	7:11
8.	"Ya No Te Quiero"	Lalo Rodríguez	6:42
