= Sexsacional..! =

Studio album by Lalo Rodríguez
- Released: 1989
- Genre: Salsa
- Label: Rodven Records

Lalo Rodríguez chronology
Un Nuevo Despertar (1988)	Sexsacional..! (1989)	De Vuelta en la Trampa (1992)

Sexsacional..! (Sexsational) is a studio album by Lalo Rodríguez released in 1989. The album reached No. 3 on the Billboard Tropical Albums chart.

== Track listing ==
No.	Title	Writer(s)	Length
1.	"Amame"	Rodolfo Castillo	4:15
2.	"Pero Llegaste Tu"	Cheo Zorrilla	5:18
3.	"No Quiero, No Puedo"	Pedro Azael	4:21
4.	"Dame Tu Corazon"	Corinne Oviedo	4:45
5.	"No Tuve Nadie"	Palmer Hernandez	3:57
6.	"Una Sucursal"	Palmer Hernandez	5:15
7.	"Lo Que Me Lastima"	Pedro Azael	4:56
8.	"Solo Soy de Ti"	Corinne Oviedo	4:30

== Chart positions ==
Chart (1990)	Peak position
US Billboard Tropical/Salsa	3
