= De Vuelta en la Trampa =

Studio album by Lalo Rodríguez
- Released: 1992
- Genre: Salsa
- Label: EMI Latin

Lalo Rodríguez chronology
Sexsacional..! (1989)	De Vuelta en la Trampa (1992)	Nací Para Cantar (1994)

De Vuelta en la Trampa (Back in the Trap) is a studio album by Lalo Rodríguez released in 1992.

== Track listing ==
No.	Title	Writer(s)	Length
1.	"Con Que Cara"	Corinne Oviedo	4:09
2.	"Mi Dueña"	Álvaro Torres	3:47
3.	"Pequeña Mia"	Álvaro Torres	4:24
4.	"Hogar Dulce Hogar"	Álvaro Torres	4:01
5.	"De Vuelta en la Trampa"	Luis Angel	4:17
6.	"Atado a Tus Brazos"	Luis Angel	4:02
7.	"No Te Demores"	Alberto Plaza	2:46
8.	"Boleros (Deseo Salvaje/Desilucion/No Te Importa)"	Lalo Rodríguez	6:00
