= Simplemente... Lalo =

Studio album by Lalo Rodríguez
- Released: 1980
- Genre: Salsa
- Label: Tierrazo Records

Lalo Rodríguez chronology
Simplemente... Lalo (1980)	Nuevamente... Lalo (1982)

Simplemente... Lalo (Simply... Lalo) is a studio album by Lalo Rodríguez released in 1980. This album marked Rodriguez's debut as a solo artist.

== Track listing ==
No.	Title	Writer(s)	Length
1.	"Maximo Chamorro"	Sylvio D. Gama	7:30
2.	"Tu No Sabes Querer"	Lalo Rodríguez	6:22
3.	"La Ultima"	A. Blanco, J. Camilloni	4:39
4.	"Las Mujeres"	Lalo Rodríguez	4:03
5.	"Francisco Andante"	Lalo Rodríguez	3:55
6.	"Si No Hay Material"	Lalo Rodríguez	5:20
7.	"No Te Importa"	Lalo Rodríguez	4:01
8.	"Tristeza Encantada"	Sylvio D. Gama	8:05
