= Ojos Negros (Azúcar Moreno album) =

Studio album by Azúcar Moreno
- Released: 1992
- Recorded: 1992
- Genre: Pop
- Length: 40:22
- Label: Sony-Epic
- Producer: Nick Patrick

Azúcar Moreno chronology
Mambo (1991)	Ojos Negros (1992)	El Amor (1994)

Alternative cover
- Japanese edition

Ojos Negros is the sixth studio album by Spanish duo Azúcar Moreno, released on Sony-Epic in 1992. The album's title translates as Dark Eyes and is a reference to one of the tracks included, the Chilean folk tune "Yo Vendo Unos Ojos Negros".

Ojos Negros, just like preceding album Mambo, was recorded in both London, Madrid and Miami and was a collaboration with acclaimed British producer Nick Patrick. Patrick started his career as a recording engineer for Heaven 17 and B.E.F. in the early 80s and has since gained prominence as a producer and arranger in his own right for a large number of artists in genres as diverse as pop and rock (Roy Orbison, Alain Souchon, Maggie Reilly), world music (Salif Keita, Gipsy Kings, Mory Kante, Youssou N'Dour) and classical (Russell Watson, Dominic Miller, Katherine Jenkins). Patrick's production of Ojos Negros marked a change in musical direction for Azúcar Moreno as it mainly featured live orchestrations including percussion, brass, woodwind and sophisticated string arrangements and that it combined both disco, club and flamenco influenced material with midtempo tracks and romantic ballads like "Vente Conmigo" and "En Tu Calle Sin Salida", and the Salazár sisters adapting their vocal style accordingly, even harmonising on certain titles.

Despite - or because of - this Ojos Negros proved to be a modest commercial success compared to the preceding Bandido and Mambo, both in Spain and Latin America. The album spawned five single releases in 1992 and early 1993, all minor hits; a cover of the Venezuelan standard "Moliendo Café", first made famous by Mario Suárez, "Hazme El Amor", co-written by Spanish singer and composer Miguel Gallardo who would go on to write several of the duo's hits later in the 90s and 2000s, "Veneno", a remixed version of "Azúcarero" and finally "Mirame", a duet with Luis Enrique. "Hazme El Amor" was in 1997 the only track from Ojos Negros to be included on Azúcar Moreno's first greatest hits album Mucho Azúcar - Grandes Éxitos.

Just like Mambo the album was released with alternative cover art in Japan.

== Track listing ==
1. "Moliendo Café" (Manzo) - 3:48
2. "Hechizo de Luna" (Mene, Parker, Williams) - 4:26
3. "En Tu Calle Sin Salida" (León, Solano) - 3:26
4. "Hazme el Amor" (Gallardo, Mole) - 4:22
5. "Vente Conmigo" (Ledo, Medina, Rubio) - 3:59
6. "Amor Latino" (Escolar, Seijas) - 3:57
7. "Azucarero" (Amigo) - 4:33
8. "Yo Vendo Unos Ojos Negros" (Chilean traditional, arranged by Nick Patrick) - 3:26
9. "Mírame" (with Luis Enrique) (Carmona) - 4:03
10. "Veneno" (De La Nuez, Rilo) - 4:22

== Personnel ==
- Azúcar Moreno - vocals
- Willy Pérez Feria - background vocals
- Jackson King - background vocals
- Cheo Quiñones - background vocals
- Luis Enrique - vocals & percussion ("Mirame")
- Luís Jardim - bass guitar, percussion, drums
- Edwin Bonilla - percussion
- Dolores Bermudez - handclapping
- Gerardo Nuñez - guitar
- Vicente Amigo - guitar
- Tim Cansfield - electric guitar
- Mitch Dalton - acoustic guitar
- Paquito Echevarria - piano
- Michael Parker - keyboards
- Randy Barlow - trumpet
- Tony Concepcion - trumpet
- Teddy Mulet - trumpet
- Dana Teboe - trombone
- Ron Asprey - saxophone
- Ed Calle - saxophone

== Production ==
- Nick Patrick - record producer, musical arranger, musical director, mixing
- Ingo Vauk - sound engineer
- Randy Barlow - arranger
- Camilo Valencia - arranger
- Jesus Bola - arranger
- Nick Ingman - arranger
- Chris Bandy - mixing assistant
- Recorded at Maison Rouge Studios (London), Sincronia (Madrid) and New River Studios (Miami)
- Mixed at The Town House Studios (London)
- Carlos Martin - graphic design
- Miguel Oriola - photography

== Sources and external links ==
- Allmusic discography
- Discogs.com discography
- Rateyourmusic.com discography
- Nick Patrick profile, EMI Music Publishing
