= Únicas =

Studio album by Azúcar Moreno
- Released: March 2002
- Recorded: July – August 2001
- Genre: Pop
- Label: Sony International
- Producer: Miguel Gallardo; Bruno Zuchetti; Danilo Ballo

Azúcar Moreno chronology
Amén (2000)	Únicas (2002)	Desde El Principio (2004)

Únicas is the eleventh studio album by Spanish duo Azúcar Moreno, released on Sony International in 2002.

Únicas was the first Azúcar Moreno album since 1990's Bandido not to be partly or entirely recorded in the United States, but in Spain and Italy, and it also features strings by the Prague Philharmonic Orchestra. Únicas however saw the Salazar sisters continuing their longtime and successful collaboration with Spanish singer and composer Miguel Gallardo, this time also in the role as main producer, assisted by Bruno Zuchetti and Danilo Ballo in Milan and Rome. The album also featured further songwriting contributions from the team Pedro del Moral and David Ferrero, who previously had remixed several of their hits like "Amén", "Abracadabra", "Mamma Mia", "Olé" and "Mecachis!".

The lead single from the album was "Besame", also released as an extended dance mix, followed by a cover of The Champs' 1958 rock hit "Tequila" and the melancholy ballad "Volvería A Nacer". The album continued the duo's fusion of rumba flamenca and contemporary urban dance music genres like disco and R&B, the track "Que Me Quiten Lo Bailao" also incorporates influences from Brazil and "Habbibi Te Quiero" ("Habibi" meaning "darling" or "my beloved" in Arabic) again features rhythms and sounds from the Middle East. The album closes with the high camp anthem "Divina De La Muerte", with the verse explaining that there is nothing better to cheer up a dull day than going on a shopping spree, and the sisters namedropping their favourite designer brands; Dolce & Gabbana, Chanel, Prada, Shiseido, Gucci, Louis Vuitton, Galliano, Dior, Moschino, Valentino, Escada, Versace, Cartier, Cavalli etc. The chorus goes on to proclaim; "Yo soy una chica con suerte – estoy divina de la muerte!" (Translated: "I'm a lucky girl – I'm deadly divine!")

Únicas was only a moderate commercial success compared to Azúcar Moreno's previous efforts, selling some 100,000 copies in their native Spain. Unicas was also one of Sony Music Entertainment's 2002 releases known to be affected by the company's copy protection software, both the album cover and the CD itself clearly state No reproducibile en PC/MAC.

Únicas came to be Azúcar Moreno's final album with Miguel Gallardo, who over a period of some ten years had written, co-written, produced or co-produced around twenty-five songs for the duo, including some of their greatest hits. After a long struggle with cancer Gallardo died in 2005.

== Track listing ==
Original CD issue.

No.	Title	Writer(s)	Length
1.	"Bésame"	Ender, Ventura	3:44
2.	"Volvería a Nacer"	Izaga	4:04
3.	"Tequila"	Flores	3:14
4.	"Quiero Pecar en Ti"	Gallardo	3:36
5.	"Habbibi, Te Quiero"	Cabañas, Gallardo	3:46
6.	"Hay Que Matar a la Muerte"	del Moral, Ferrero, Gallardo	4:03
7.	"Tú Eres Para Mí" (You're My Destiny)	Aneas, Aneas, Mejuto	4:01
8.	"Ni Contigo Ni Sin Ti"	del Moral, Ferrero, Gallardo	4:15
9.	"Hueles a Noche de Amor"	Revuelta	3:15
10.	"Que Me Quiten Lo Bailao"	Alonso, Castro, Flores, Salazar	4:04
11.	"Divina de la Muerte"	Rilo	3:56

== Personnel ==
- Azùcar Moreno – lead vocals, backing vocals
- Cinzia Astolfi – backing vocals
- Angela Bautista – backing vocals
- Triana Bautista – backing vocals
- Emilio "Webo" Cuervo – backing vocals
- Esmeralda Grao – backing vocals
- Araceli Lavado – backing vocals
- Miguel Morant – backing vocals
- Danilo Ballo – keyboards, programming
- Luis Cabañas – programming
- Jesús Catalá – percussion
- Miguel Angel Collado – keyboards, programming, backing vocals
- Danny Costa – percussion, palmas
- Pedro del Moral – programming
- David Ferrero – programming
- Enzo Filippone – drums
- Pedro J. González – Spanish guitar
- José Agustín Guereñu – bass guitar
- Manuel Machado – trumpet, soloist
- Segundo Mijares – saxophone, soloist
- Juan Miguel Mogica – programming
- William Paredes – trombone
- David Perez – accordion
- Bruno Zuchetti – keyboards, programming
- Ludovico Vagnone – acoustic guitar, electric guitar, Spanish guitar, backing vocals, recording
- The Prague Philharmonic Orchestra – orchestra
- Mario Klemens – orchestral conductor
- Richter Arnolt – violin, orchestra
- Pok Bahuslav – violin, orchestra
- Kristyna Belohlavkova – violin, orchestra
- Marek Elznic – violin, orchestra
- Rammy Emanuelle – violin, orchestra
- Silar Franchíl – violin, orchestra
- Froneh Frant – violin, orchestra
- Trykar Marek – violin, orchestra
- Vladyka Milan – violin, orchestra
- Mrázek Ivo – violin, orchestra
- Hron Jakub – violin, orchestra
- Kóhle Jan – violin, orchestra
- Pavicek Jeromin – violin, orchestra
- Holenà Jirí – violin, orchestra
- Zajíe Jiri – violin, orchestra
- Millite Kaudersova – violin, orchestra
- Mchutil Josef – violin, orchestra
- Bohumil Kotmel – violin, orchestra
- Forbelská Ludmila – violin, orchestra
- Mracková Ludmila – violin, orchestra
- Srámek Morek – violin, orchestra
- Branislav Ondrèv – violin, orchestra
- Ysech Pavel – violin, orchestra
- Klas Petr – violin, orchestra
- Josef Pokluda – violin, orchestra
- Sisler Radim – violin, orchestra
- Tatána Richterová – violin, orchestra
- Dana Sislerová – violin, orchestra
- Lauda Stepón – violin, orchestra
- Barinka Tomas – violin, orchestra
- Richard Valasek – violin, orchestra
- Zajacik Vladimir – violin, orchestra
- Dudek Van – violin, orchestra
- Köhler Van – violin, orchestra
- Jkosa Virí – violin, orchestra
- Vlastimil Zeman – violin, orchestra

== Production ==
- Miguel Gallardo – record producer, musical director, realization
- Bruno Zuchetti – musical arranger, producer, musical director, realization, recording
- Danilo Ballo – musical arranger, producer, musical director, realization, recording
- Miguel Angel Collado – musical arranger, musical director
- Emanuele Ruffinengo – production coordination, musical director, realization
- Ludovico Vagnone – recording
- José Peña Engineer – digital editing, mixing
- Riccardo Dacunto – recording
- Fernando Chávez – recording
- Sabino Cannone – mixing, sound design
- Mark Bishop – sound design
- Jose Vinader – engineer
- Francisco Gude – engineer
- Marcos Liviano – assistant
- Michael Hradisky – assistant
- Antonio Baglio – mastering engineer
- Carlos Martin – graphic design, art direction
- Juanjo Manez – stylist
- Adolfo Cabiedes – interpretation
- Joan Alsina – photography
- Recorded at Zodiak Studios and Altavox Studios (Milan), Trendy Studios (Rome), Ludus Studios & Trak Studios (Madrid). Strings recorded at Smečky Studios (Prague).

== Certifications ==
Region	Certification	Certified units/sales
Spain (PROMUSICAE)	Gold	50,000^{^}
^{^} Shipments figures based on certification alone.
