= Azúcar Moreno =

Spanish music duo

- Origin: Badajoz, Spain
- Genres: Latin pop, pop, flamenco
- Years active: 1984–2008; 2013–present
- Labels: EMI, Capitol, CBS Records, Sony Music, Epic Records
- Members: Antonia (Toñi) Salazar; Encarnación (Encarna) Salazar

Azúcar Moreno (Spanish pronunciation: [aˈθukaɾ moˈɾeno]; Spanish for "brown sugar") is a Spanish music duo composed of two sisters: Antonia "Toñi" and Encarnación "Encarna" Salazar. The duo has sold more than three million albums and singles since 1984 domestically, and became famous in Europe, the United States and Latin America in the 1990s, with approximately twelve million albums sold worldwide.

== Biography ==
Consisting of sisters Antonia "Toñi" (14 March 1963) and Encarnación "Encarna" Salazar (10 January 1961), the singing duo comes from Badajoz. They are part of a large family of performers: their grandfather was a musician, their father a singer and songwriter, their brothers the members of band Los Chunguitos and their uncle is famous singer Porrina de Badajoz. The Azúcar Moreno sisters began their singing careers as back-up vocalists to their brothers, but in 1982, they were discovered and signed by record label EMI Spain, resulting in two albums with moderate commercial success released in 1984 and 1986. In 1988 they signed with CBS-Epic and relaunched their music with a bolder production style and matching sexier image and released the album Carne De Melocotón. They became one of the first Spanish acts to combine their Romani heritage and traditional cantaora vocal style with urban dance rhythms like disco, rhythm and blues, funk and techno. One of their first hit singles was a house music remix of the track "Aunque Me Falte El Aire", released in 1988. A full-length remix album Mix In Spain was released in 1989 and the follow-up single "Debajo Del Olivo" also became a minor club hit in Continental Europe.

Azúcar Moreno had their commercial breakthrough in Continental Europe and Latin America after singing their song "Bandido", written and produced by prolific Spanish dance producer Raul Orellana, at the Eurovision Song Contest 1990. Unfortunately, the start of their performance was marred by sound problems at the arena in Zagreb. "Bandido" went out as entry number one of twenty-two participating countries. The contest was broadcast live to an audience of approximately 500 million viewers - but due to a tape technician not starting the pre-recorded backing track in time both the singers, their band and the live orchestra missed their cues. This resulted in the sisters finally having to walk off stage, make a second entrance and start the song and their dance routine all over. In his book The Eurovision Song Contest - The Official History, British Eurovision historian John Kennedy O'Connor in turn describes the incident as "every artist's worst nightmare". Despite this very unfortunate debacle "Bandido" finished an honourable fifth and the song and its accompanying album, also including follow-up single "Devórame Otra Vez", became the starting point of the duo's international career. During the following years, Encarna and Toñi Salazar had the opportunity to work with top producers Emilio Estefan and Estéfano, recording in both the United Kingdom and the United States, achieving a Billboard Music Award for Best Latin Group and becoming one of the top-selling artists in the Hispanic pop scene. 1991's Mambo became their commercial break-through in Japan and the title track of their 1994 album El Amor was featured in Luis Llosa's movie The Specialist.

On their following albums Azúcar Moreno widened their repertoire as they combined original material sung in their typical flamenco vocal style with traditional folk songs like the Chilean "Yo Vendos Unos Ojos Negros", the Italian "'O sole mio" and the Hebrew "Hava Nagila", influences from other Latin and Caribbean genres like rhumba, mambo, bolero, merengue, reggaeton, salsa and dancehall, as well as Spanish language versions of rock and pop classics like the Rolling Stones' "Paint It, Black", Jackie Wilson's "(Your Love Keeps Lifting Me) Higher and Higher" and The Animals' "Don't Let Me Be Misunderstood".

As of 2006, Azúcar Moreno had released some 40 singles, 13 studio albums as well as a large number of hits compilations. Their greatest hit to date was "Solo Se Vive Una Vez" (translated as "You only live once"), which topped the charts in Spain as well as a number of countries in South and Central America. In the 2000s (decade) the track was included on the first Spanish language versions of karaoke video game SingStar. Azúcar Moreno are one of the best selling acts in the history of Spanish popular music, with combined sales of approximately 2 million albums in their native Spain alone and it also makes them one of the most commercially successful acts alongside Sweden's ABBA, Canada's Céline Dion, and the UK's Bucks Fizz to have their international breakthrough via the Eurovision Song Contest. The Salazar sisters have been the target of much gossip and some of their songs have been slightly controversial in their homeland. Many of their fans see some of their songs as having feminist content, and the duo has been prominently featured on the covers of Spanish tabloid magazines since the early 1990s. The sisters also have a strong gay following in Spain, their 2000 album Amén included a torch ballad especially dedicated to their loyal LGBT fans, "Amigo Mío", and later they also recorded high camp songs like "Divina De La Muerte" and "Sobreviviré", the latter a flamenco version of Gloria Gaynor's gay anthem "I Will Survive".

In 2006, Azúcar Moreno returned to EMI after 18 years with CBS-Sony and were considered one of the top artists to represent Spain again in the Eurovision Song Contest. Ultimately RTVE's choice fell upon Las Ketchup, feeling the sisters' tribute to legendary Spanish singer, dancer, and actress Lola Flores, "Bailando con Lola" ("Dancing with Lola"), was too flamenco-flavoured. Nevertheless, as Toñi and Encarna sing in the opening song "20 Años" on the Bailando Con Lola album: It's been 20 years / Nothing else / 20 years of singing / And we've still got so much to give ...

On November 28, 2007, Toñi Salazár announced to the Spanish media that the duo "would withdraw from the music scene until further notice" due to her sister Encarna having been diagnosed with breast cancer and was to go undergo chemotherapy and then needed time for recuperation.

In September 2008 it was announced that Encarna Salazar had made a full recovery and had been given a clean bill of health but also that there were no immediate plans for the two sisters to continue their musical careers as a duo due to personal differences.

In October 2013 the duo reunited in the TV show Tu Cara Me Suena after 5 years being apart as Azúcar Moreno and as sisters. In the show their brothers Los Chunguitos were participating that season (Antonia from Azucar Moreno had participated in the show's first season in 2011) and Antonia and Encarna were invited as judges to see Los Chunguitos impersonate them singing "Bandido". Antonia appeared first and then Encarna appeared as a surprise inside a huge box. Both sisters had a lovely reunion where they hugged and announced the return of Azucar Moreno for 2014 and that both fixed their differences.

At the beginning of 2014 they began touring Spain and making TV performances again, they released their first single in 8 years “Punto De Partida”. In 2015 they released another new single “Pegaíto”. In 2016 they released a remake of their hit song “Debajo Del Olivo” with new vocals and a new sound and released it with a new song “Agarraita A La Vida”. In 2018 They released another single “No Me Des Guerra” which is a cover song and they released a music video for it, their first music video in 12 years.

In October 2019 Azúcar Moreno announced their new album “El Secreto” and released the first single with the same name. In 2020 during the 2020 pandemic they released 4 more singles, “Pa’ Fuera”, “Love Is Love” (Proceeds for this single went to charities to fight COVID-19), “Soy Yo”, and “La Cura”. They made several TV performances and radio interviews to promote the album and singles.

On September 4, 2020, the album “El Secreto” was finally released with 9 brand new songs, they also made pre-orders for signed physical copies of the album online, it was their first album in almost 15 years after 2006's “Bailando Con Lola”.

In January 2022 the duo took part in Benidorm Fest with their song "Postureo", hoping to represent Spain at the Eurovision Song Contest 2022, however they failed to qualify to the final of the contest, ending up 5th on the first semi-final.

In 2022 their eurovision song “Bandido” was featured in the Australian movie Of an age

In 2023 they released a cover of Rigoberta Bandini's “Ay Mamá”, which was Rigoberta's song for Benidorm Fest 2022 and competed with “Postureo”.

In 2024 it will be the 40th anniversary of Azucar Moreno, both Toñi and Encarna have said they will have some announcements through the year to celebrate the occasion.

== Discography ==
=== Albums ===
Year	Album	Sales	Certification
1984	Con La Miel En Los Labios	50,000+	Gold
1986	Estimúlame	50,000+	Gold
1988	Carne De Melocotón	50,000+	Gold
1989	Mix In Spain (Remix album)		
1990	Bandido	300,000+	x3 Platinum
1990	The Sugar Mix Album (Remix album)		
1991	Mambo	200,000+	x2 Platinum
1992	Ojos Negros	100,000+	x1 Platinum
1994	El Amor	100,000+	x1 Platinum
1996	Esclava De Tu Piel	500,000+	x5 Platinum
1997	Mucho Azúcar - Grandes Éxitos	50,000+	Gold
1998	Olé	200,000+	x2 Platinum
2000	Amén	300,000+	x3 Platinum
2002	Únicas	100,000+	x1 Platinum
2004	Desde El Principio	50,000+	Gold
2006	Bailando Con Lola	50,000+	Gold
2020	El Secreto		

(*)Sales in Spain

=== Singles ===
- 1984 "Azúcar Moreno" / "Luna Coqueta"
- 1984 "Que Si, Que No" / "No Quiero Que Me Quieras"
- 1984 "Canela" / "El Girasol"
- 1986 "Estimúlame" / "Ámame"
- 1988 "Aunque Me Falte El Aire" / "Limón Amargo"
- 1988 "Debajo Del Olivo" (Mix In Spain) / "Debajo Del Olivo" (Dub Mix)
- 1989 "Aunque Me Falte El Aire" (Lerele Mix) / "Aunque Me Falte El Aire" (Dub Mix)
- 1989 "Chica Vaivén" (Express Mix) / "Chica Vaivén" (Dub Mix)
- 1989 "Alerta Corazón" (Casablanca Mix) / "Alerta Corazón" (Dub Mix)
- 1990 "Bandido" / "Bandido" (Instrumental)
- 1990 "Ven Devórame Otra Vez"
- 1990 "A Caballo"
- 1991 "¡Torero!"
- 1991 "Mambo"
- 1991 "Tú Quieres Más (Porque Te Amo)"
- 1991 "Ahora O Nunca"
- 1991 "Lujuria"
- 1992 "Moliendo Café"
- 1992 "Hazme El Amor"
- 1993 "Veneno"
- 1993 "Azucarero" (Remix)
- 1993 "Mírame" (with Luis Enrique)
- 1994 "El Amor" / "Ando Buscando Un Amor"
- 1994 "No Será Fácil"
- 1994 "Hay Que Saber Perder"
- 1996 "Sólo Se Vive Una Vez" (The Caribbean Remixes) / (The Mediterranean Remixes)
- 1996 "Esclava De Tu Piel"
- 1996 "Hoy Tengo Ganas De Ti"
- 1996 "La Cita"
- 1997 "Bandolero"
- 1997 "Hava Naguila"
- 1997 "Muévete Salvaje" / "Bandido"
- 1997 "Tápame"
- 1998 "Mecachis"
- 1998 "No Pretenderás"
- 1998 "Olé"
- 1998 "Cumbaya" / "Ese Beso"
- 1999 "Agua Que No Has De Beber"
- 2000 "Amén"
- 2000 "Dale Que Dale"
- 2000 "Mamma Mia"
- 2001 "Ay Amor"
- 2002 "Bésame" (Mixes)
- 2002 "Volvería A Nacer"
- 2002 "Tequila" (Mixes)
- 2002 "Divina De La Muerte"
- 2003 "Mi Ritmo"
- 2003 "Sobreviviré"
- 2004 "Se Me Va"
- 2004 "Él"
- 2006 "Clávame"
- 2006 "Bailando Con Lola"
- 2007 "20 Años"
- 2014 "Punto de Partida"
- 2015 "Pegaíto"
- 2016 "Debajo Del Olivo [2016 Version]"
- 2016 "Agarraita A La Vida"
- 2018 "No Me Des Guerra"
- 2019 "El Secreto"
- 2020 "Pa’ Fuera"
- 2020 "Love Is Love"
- 2020 "Soy Yo"
- 2020 "La Cura"
- 2021 "Postureo"
- 2023 "Ay mamá"

== Sources and external links ==
- Azucar Moreno's Official Twitter
- Hispavista biography
- Bonacich, Drago. Biography of Azúcar Moreno at AllMusic. Retrieved 2012-04-23.
- CMTV Argentina biography

Preceded by Nina with "Nacida para amar"	Spain in the Eurovision Song Contest; 1990	Succeeded by Sergio Dalma with "Bailar pegados"
