= El Amor (Azúcar Moreno album) =

Studio album by Azúcar Moreno
- Released: 1994
- Recorded: 1994
- Genre: Pop
- Length: 53:48
- Label: Sony International
- Producers: Emilio Estefan Jr. Estéfano; Juan R. Márquez; Jaime Stinus; Raúl Orellana; Julio Palacios

Azúcar Moreno chronology
Ojos Negros (1992)	El Amor (1994)	Esclava De Tu Piel (1996)

Professional ratings
Review scores
Source	Rating
Allmusic	(not rated)

El Amor is the seventh studio album by Spanish duo Azúcar Moreno, released on Sony International in 1994.

The album saw Azúcar Moreno making their first collaborations with some of the top names in the world of Latin music in the United States, such as former Miami Sound Machine member Emilio Estefan Jr., composer and producer Estéfano, Kike Santander and Juan R. Marquez, the team behind numerous hits for world-renowned artists such as Julio Iglesias, Gloria Estefan, Jon Secada, Shakira and Chayanne. The title track and the biggest hit "El Amor" was featured in the Hollywood movie The Specialist, starring Sylvester Stallone and Sharon Stone. The extended 12" mix of the song was included on the CD version of El Amor and a special edition of the soundtrack album called The Specialist - The Remixes featured Tony Moran's twelve minutes forty-two seconds Multiple Orgasm Mix, and the song managed to cross over to the US dance charts, reaching #50 on Billboard's Hot Dance Club Play listing in early 1995. The follow-up single "No Será Facil", produced by the same team, was written by Gloria Estefan and originally recorded by the Miami Sound Machine on their 1982 album Rio. Further hits from the album include "No Tendré Piedad" and "Hay Que Saber Perder".

As opposed to Azúcar Moreno's previous albums Bandido and Mambo, El Amor did not include any cover versions of songs from the Anglosaxon world of rock and pop but it did see the Salazár sisters interpreting material by some of the Spanish and Latin American music scene's most acknowledged songwriters and artists. Cherito Jimenez' merengue "Nadie Como Tu" was originally recorded by The New York Band in 1989. "Ladrón de Amores" was penned by Spanish singer-songwriter Rosana Arbelo. "Ando Buscando un Amor" was written by one of the Dominican Republic's leading composers and singers, Victor Victor (full name Victor José Victor Rojas) and "De Lo Que Te Has Perdido" is one of legendary Mexican singer Marco Antonio Muñiz' signature tunes. "Desnúdate, Desnúdame" was originally one of Spanish singer-songwriter Miguel Gallardo's biggest hits in the 1970s. "A Galope" was a newly composed collaboration between Gallardo and the writers of Azúcar Moreno's breakthrough hit "Bandido", Raúl Orellana and Jaime Stinus.

El Amor became Azúcar Moreno's breakthrough on the North American market and won them the prize for Best Group Of The Year at Billboard's Latin Music Awards in 1994.

"El Amor" and "No Será Facil" were both included on Azúcar Moreno's first greatest hits compilation Mucho Azúcar - Grandes Éxitos in 1997.

== Track listing ==
1. "El Amor" (Estefano, Kiko Santander) - 4:52
2. "No Será Fácil" (Gloria Estefan) - 4:20
3. "Hay Que Saber Perder" (Emilio Estefan Jr., Juan R. Márquez) - 3:59
4. "No Tendré Piedad" (J. L. Abel, Jaime Stinus) - 3:13
5. "Colgada de la Luna" (Victor Victor) - 3:37
6. "Ladrón de Amores" (Rosana Arbelo) - 2:57
7. "Desnúdate, Desnúdame" (Miguel Gallardo) - 3:40
8. "Nadie Como Tu" (Cherito) - 4:09
9. "No Me Vuelvo a Enamorar" (Aguilera Valadez Alberto) - 3:32
10. "De Lo Que Te Has Perdido" (Dino Ramos) - 3:41
11. "A Galope" (Miguel Gallardo, Raúl Orellana, Jaime Stinus) - 3:53
12. "Ando Buscando un Amor" (Victor Victor) - 4:23
13. "El Amor" [12"] (Estefano, Kiko Santander) - 7:32
  - CD bonus track

== Personnel ==
- Azúcar Moreno - vocals
- Joel Numa - drums, programming
- Rene Toledo - guitar
- Julio Hernandez - bass guitar
- Randall Barlow - brass, trumpet
- Teddy Mulet - brass, trombone, trumpet, vocals
- Clay Oswald - piano
- Luis Santiago - percussion
- Estéfano - vocals
- Miriam Mandelkern - vocals
- Tony Concepcion - brass
- Dana Teboe - brass
- Franco Castellani - piano
- Juan R. Marquez - bass guitar, guitar, programming, vocals
- Manny López - percussion
- Tomás de San Julian - flamenco vocals
- Eduardo García - bass
- Jaime Stinus - guitar, keyboards, programming, AKAI sampler
- M. Gas - piano
- Tito Duarte - vocals, percussion, programming
- Vicente Borland - vocals
- Bilby - accordion
- Xabi Ibañez - keyboards
- Gerardo Nuñez - flamenco guitar
- Raúl Orellana - programming
- Jose Luis Medrano - trumpet

== Production ==
- Emilio Estefan, Jr. - record producer, musical director ("El Amor", "No Sera Facil", "Hay Que Saber Perder")
- Estéfano - producer ("No Sera Facil"), vocal producer, musical arranger ("El Amor", "No Sera Facil", "Hay Que Saber Perder")
- Kike Santander - musical arranger ("El Amor", "No Sera Facil", "Hay Que Saber Perder")
- Juan R. Márquez - producer ("Hay Que Saber Perder"), musical arranger ("El Amor", "No Sera Facil", "Hay Que Saber Perder")
- Jaime Stinus - producer ("No Tendré Piedad", "A Galope")
- Raúl Orellana - producer, musical arranger, musical director ("A Galope")
- Julio Palacios - producer, musical arranger ("Colgada De La Luna", "Ladron De Amores", "Desnudate, Desnudame", "Nadie Como Tu", "De Lo Que Te Has Perdido", "Ando Buscando Un Amor")
- Franco Castellani - musical arranger
- Eric Schilling - mixing
- Mike Couzzi - mixing
- Ron Taylor - engineer, mixing
- Javier Vacas - engineer
- Patrice Wilkinson Levinsohn - engineer
- Chris Wiggins - assistant engineer
- Sebastián Krys - assistant engineer
- Sean Chambers - assistant engineer
- Scott Canto - assistant engineer
- Marcelo Anez - assistant engineer
- Carlos Martin - design

== Sources and external links ==
- Allmusic discography
- Discogs.com discography
- Rateyourmusic.com discography
- Estéfano biography, BMI
