= José Antonio Rodríguez (musician) =

Spanish flamenco musician

- Born: 28 March 1964 (age 60)
- Origin: Córdoba, Spain
- Genres: Flamenco music
- Occupation(s): Composer, guitarist, music professor
- Instrument: Guitar
- Website: Official website

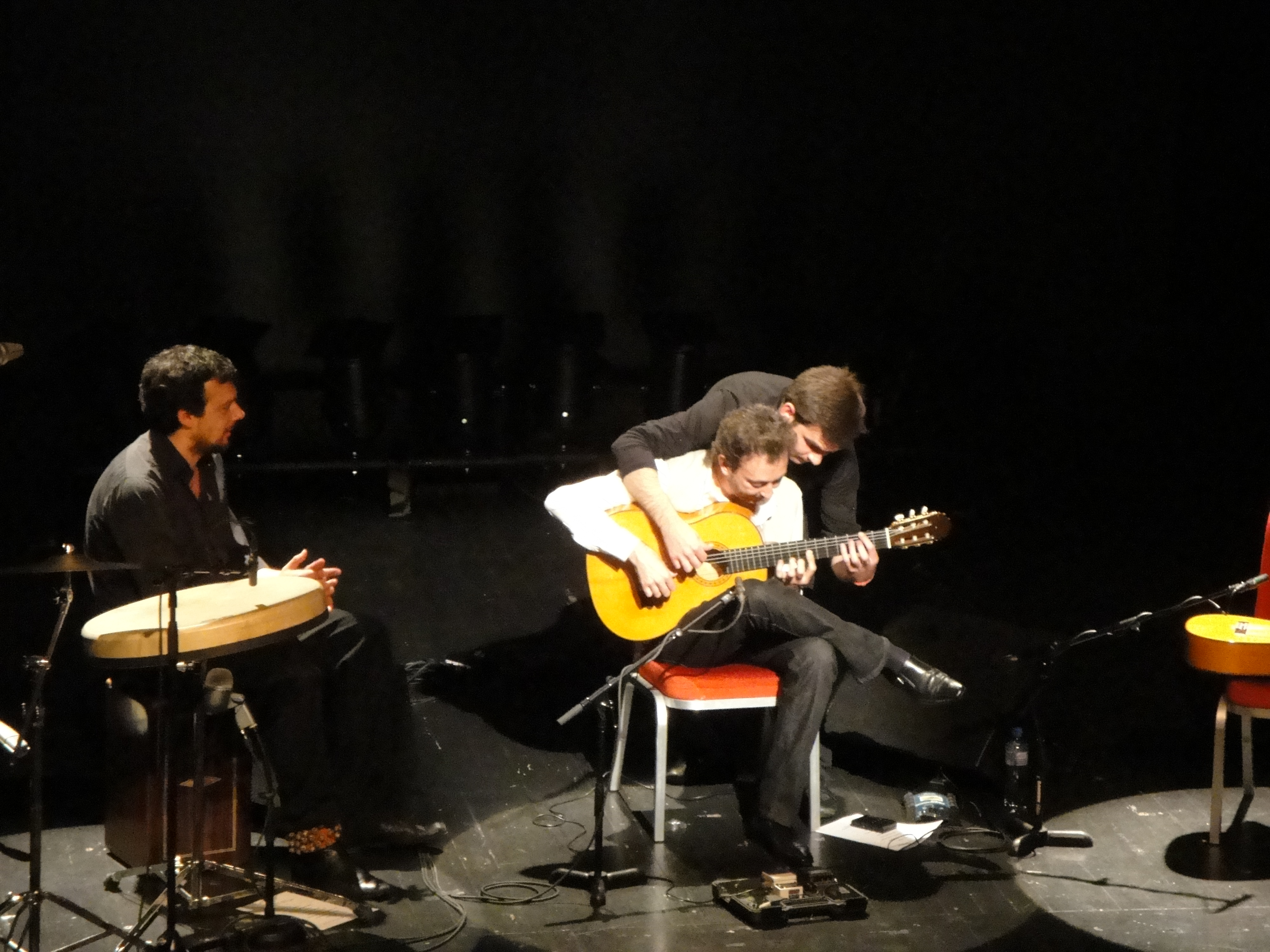
José Antonio Rodríguez at the In Guitar Festival in Winterthur 2012

José Antonio Rodríguez Muñoz (born 28 March 1964 in Córdoba, Spain) is a flamenco guitarist, composer and music professor from Córdoba, Spain.

== Awards ==
In the 1980s he won several national prizes, e.g. 1982 the Primer Premio para Guitarra Flamenca de Concierto at the XI Certamen Nacional de Guitarra Flamenca in Jerez de la Frontera and 1986 the Premio Ramón Montoya for solo guitar at the Concurso Nacional de Arte Flamenco.

== Professor ==
In 1984 he became a professor of flamenco guitar at the Conservatorio Superior de Música de Córdoba.

== Compositions ==
He composed works for films, TV, ballett and orchestra

- 1987 he composed the orchestral piece "Guajira para guitarra flamenca y orquesta"
- 1990 he wrote again for orchestra "Viento de libertad"
- 1992 The Bienal de Arte Flamenco "Ciudad de Sevilla" assigned him with composition, orchestration and musical conduction of the show "Tango". In the same year he participated in the recording "Sevilla Es Así" for the opening program of the world's fair EXPO 1992 in Sevilla.
- 1994 he composed together with Joan Albert Amargós the work "Réquiem", world premiered by the Compañía Andaluza De Danza with a choreography of Mario Maya
- 1996 he published "Viento de Libertad" with new orchestration under the conductor Joan Albert Amargós
- 1997 Rodríguez composed the work "El Jaleo" for the Centro Andaluz de Danza with a choreography of Maria Pagés and Fernando Romero
- 2001 he published "El guitarrista azul", another orchestral piece
- 2003 he composed the work "Tiempo" for the Ballet Nacional de España. Its premiere with a choreography von Joaquín Grilo took place on 23 January 2004.
- In addition, he published five solo albums

== Discography ==
- 1984: Calahorra
- 1988: Callejón De Las Flores
- 1999: Manhattan De La Frontera
- 2003: La Leyenda
- 2007: Córdoba... en el tiempo
- 2012: Anartista
- 2016: Adios Muchachos
