= Mambo (album) =

Studio album by Azúcar Moreno
- Released: 1991
- Recorded: 1991
- Genre: Pop
- Length: 58:59 (LP 42:42)
- Label: CBS-Epic
- Producers: Enrique "Kiki" Garcia; Hector Almaguer; Julian Ruiz; Zeus B. Held; Garry Hughes; Nick Fisher; Julio Palacios; Raúl Orellana; Jaime Stinus; Alex de la Nuez

Azúcar Moreno chronology
The Sugar Mix Album (1990)	Mambo (1991)	Ojos Negros (1992)

Alternative cover
- Japanese edition

Mambo is the fifth studio album by Spanish duo Azúcar Moreno, released on CBS-Epic in 1991.

The duo's two previous studio albums Carne De Melocotón and Bandido had resulted in the release of two remix albums, Mix in Spain and The Sugar Mix Album. Mambo was their first studio album on which the influences from contemporary dance music genres like house music, R&B and hip hop were fully integrated in the original production; the track "Feria" even saw the sisters making their debut as rappers. The album was also the first not to be entirely recorded in Spain or predominantly produced by their longtime collaborator Julio Palacios - it had no less than ten producers.

The lead single "Torero!", although as typically flamenco-flavoured as their international breakthrough single "Bandido", was in fact written and produced by Englishmen Nick Fisher and Garry Hughes and German Zeus B. Held and was recorded in London. Fisher and Hughes have since gone on to collaborate with numerous artists in the electronica/experimental/world music genres under the moniker Echo System, including Björk, The Shamen, Salif Keita, Garbage and Pop Will Eat Itself. "Torero!" was in 1992 covered in Turkish under the title "Yetti Artik" ("That's it" in Turkish) by Tarkan, one of Turkey's biggest stars both domestically and internationally. The song was included on his debut album Yine Sensiz ("Again without you" in Turkish).

Follow-up single and title track "Mambo" was written and produced by Enrique "Kiki" Garcia and Hector Almaguer, both longtime collaborators with Gloria Estefan and Miami Sound Machine and writers of numerous hits for Julio Iglesias, Chayanne and José Luis Rodríguez. "Mambo" was Azúcar Moreno's first recording made in Miami, the United States and also the first to include Cuban influences, of which there would be plenty on the following albums Ojos Negros and El Amor. In the United States the single reached #6 on Billboard's Hot Latin Tracks chart.

Further singles issued from Mambo include a cover of Nino Segarra's "Tu Quieres Más (Porque Te Amo)" (#12, US Hot Latin Tracks), "Lujuria" and "Ahora O Nunca", the latter composed by the team behind "Bandido". Just like the Bandido album, Mambo also featured a number of flamenco/dance cover versions of songs from a wide variety of genres; the 60s soul classic "(Your Love Keeps Lifting Me) Higher and Higher", originally recorded by Jackie Wilson, the Mexican standard "Bésame Mucho" from the 1940s, The Rolling Stones' 1966 hit "Paint It Black" and "El Cóndor Pasa", a Peruvian Andean folk tune covered by Simon & Garfunkel on their final studio album Bridge Over Troubled Water in 1970.

Mambo, which sold double platinum in Azúcar Moreno's native Spain, became their proper breakthrough album not only in Latin America but also on the Japanese market where all their albums have been released ever since. The Japanese edition of Mambo was issued with different cover art and the CD included two tracks from their previous studio albums Carne De Melocotón and Bandido, "Aunque Me Falte El Aire" and "Bandido", as bonus features. The ten track vinyl edition issued in most parts of the world omitted "Feria", "Paint It Black" and the alternate mixes of "Torero!" and "Mambo". In the United States the album reached #5 on Billboard's Latin Pop chart.

"Mambo" and "Tu Quieres Más (Porque Te Amo)" were both included on Azúcar Moreno's first greatest hits album Mucho Azúcar – Grandes Éxitos, released in 1997.

== Track listing ==
CD

1. "Mambo" (Hector Almaguer, Enrique "Kiki" Garcia) - 3:47
2. "Lujuria" (Javier Losada, Julián Ruiz) - 4:50
3. "Torero!" (Nick Fisher, Garry Hughes, lyrics: Luis G. Escolar) - 4:36
4. "Tu Quieres Más (Porque Te Amo)" (Pedro Arroyo) - 4:26
5. "Ahora O Nunca" (José L. Abel, Raúl Orellana, Jaime Stinus) - 3:53
6. "Feria" (Javier Losada, Julián Ruiz) - 3:16
7. "Bailaor (Bolero)" (Ayram, C. Biondi, C. Tarantola, M. Biondi, Spanish lyrics: Pedro L. Rito) - 3:36
8. "Tus Besos Me Matan" (J. Miguel Evora, Isidoro Muñoz) - 4:33
9. "Loca Reloca" ("(Your Love Keeps Lifting Me) Higher and Higher") (Gary Lee Jackson, Raynard Miner, Paul Smith, Spanish lyrics: Luis G. Escolar) - 4:20
10. "Bésame Mucho" (Consuelo Velázquez) - 4:26
11. "Paint It Black" (Mick Jagger, Keith Richards, Spanish lyrics: José Carreras) - 4:48
12. "El Cóndor Pasa" (Jorge Milchberg, Daniel A. Robles, Spanish lyrics: Manuel Clavero) - 4:15
13. "Torero!" (Single Version) (Nick Fisher, Gary Hughes, lyrics: Luis G. Escolar) - 3:57
14. "Mambo" (CD Mix) (Hector Almaguer, Enrique "Kiki" Garcia) - 4:09

LP

Side A

1. "Mambo" (Hector Almaguer, Enrique "Kiki" Garcia) - 3:47
2. "Lujuria" (Javier Losada, Julián Ruiz) - 4:50
3. "Torero!" (Nick Fisher, Garry Hughes, Spanish lyrics: Luis G. Escolar) - 4:36
4. "Tu Quieres Más (Porque Te Amo)" (Pedro Arroyo) - 4:26
5. "Ahora O Nunca" (José L. Abel, Raúl Orellana, Jaime Stinus) - 3:53

Side B

1. "Bailaor (Bolero)" (Ayram, C. Biondi, C. Tarantola, M. Biondi, Spanish lyrics: Pedro L. Rito) - 3:36
2. "Tus Besos Me Matan" (J. Miguel Evora, Isidoro Muñoz) - 4:33
3. "Loca Reloca" ("(Your Love Keeps Lifting Me) Higher and Higher") (Gary Lee Jackson, Raynard Miner, Paul Smith, Spanish lyrics: Luis G. Escolar) - 4:20
4. "Bésame Mucho" (Consuelo Velázquez) - 4:26
5. "El Cóndor Pasa" (Jorge Milchberg, Daniel A. Robles, Spanish lyrics: Manuel Clavero) - 4:15

== Production ==
- Enrique "Kiki" Garcia - record producer ("Mambo")
- Hector Almaguer - record producer ("Mambo")
- Julian Ruiz - record producer ("Lujuria", "Feria", "Paint It Black")
- Zeus B. Held - producer ("Torero!")
- Nick Fisher - producer ("Torero!")
- Garry Hughes - producer ("Torero!")
- Raúl Orellana - producer ("Ahora O Nunca")
- Jaime Stinus - producer ("Ahora O Nunca")
- Julio Palacios - producer ("Tu Quieres Más (Porque Te Amo)", "Bailaor (Bolero)", "Tus Besos Me Matan", "Loca Reloca", "Besame Mucho", "El Condor Pasa")
- Alex de la Nuez - producer ("Bailaor (Bolero)", "El Condor Pasa")
- Recorded at Studio Center West (Miami) ("Mambo"), Doublewironics (Madrid), Eastcote Studios (London) ("Torero!"), Estudios Sincronia (Madrid) and "El Camión" (Barcelona).
