= Lalo Rodríguez =

Puerto Rican singer (1958–2022)

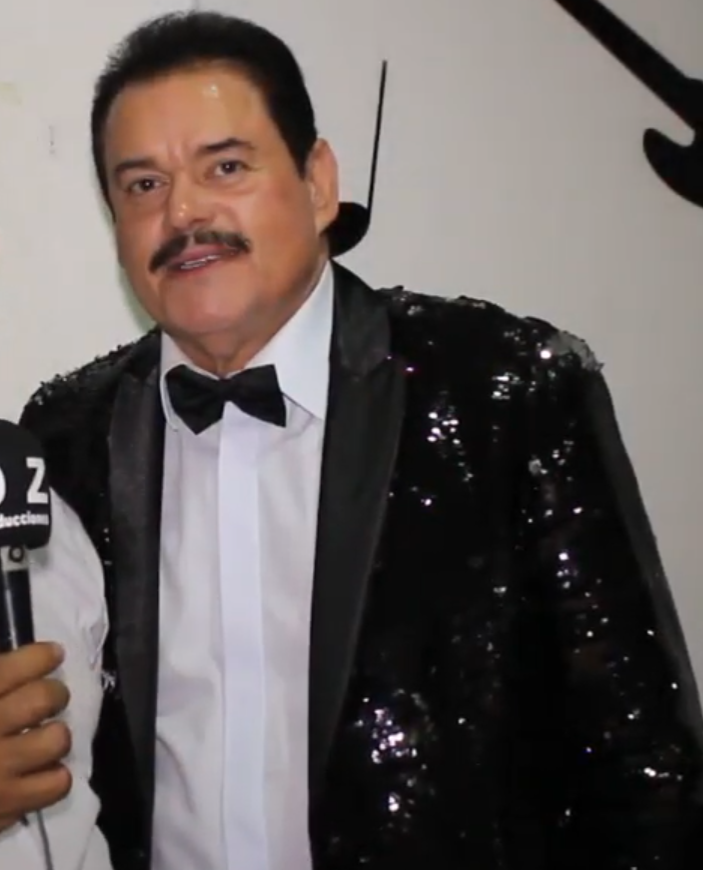
- Rodríguez in 2019
- Born: Ubaldo Rodríguez Santos; 16 May 1958; Rio Piedras, Puerto Rico
- Died: 13 December 2022 (aged 64); Carolina, Puerto Rico
- Burial place: La Santa Cruz Cemetery (Carolina, Puerto Rico)
- Musical career
- Genres: Salsa
- Occupation(s): Singer, Song Writer
- Instrument: Vocals
- Years active: 1973–2022
- Labels: Coco; Tierrazo; Rodven; EMI Latin; Global, Hi-Yield
- Formerly of: Eddie Palmieri's Orchestra; Machito Orchestra; Tommy Olivencia's Band

Ubaldo Rodríguez Santos (May 16, 1958 – December 13, 2022), known professionally as Lalo Rodríguez, was a Puerto Rican salsa singer recognized as one of the pioneers of the subgenre of Romantic or Erotic Salsa.

== Early life ==
Rodriguez was born in Rio Piedras, Puerto Rico on May 16, 1958 to parents Magdalena Santos and Jose Rodriguez. At age nine, he started singing in traditional Puerto Rican festivals, as well as on radio and television programs. "Rodríguez won a children's talent contest at the age of seven and at 12 he was part of the Tempo Moderno orchestra, in which he remained for four years."

== Early career ==
In 1973, at 15 years of age, with the help of producer Harvey Averne, Rodríguez moved from Puerto Rico to New York to join Eddie Palmieri's band. His debut album at the age of 17 was Palmieri's Sun of Latin Music, with Rodriguez providing vocals for the album's hit song "Un Dia Bonito" (a Beautiful Day) as well as “Nada de ti” (Nothing of you), “Nunca contigo” (Never with you) and “Deseo salvaje” (Wild desire) - a bolero written by Rodríguez. This 1975 album would be the first Salsa album to win a Grammy at the 18th Grammy Awards. A year later he sang on Unfinished Masterpiece, which was nominated for a Grammy at 19th Grammy Awards in 1976. Palmieri gave him his new first name "Lalo." After leaving Palmieri, he was invited to join, Machito Grillo's Orchestra where they recorded the album “Fireworks“, which was also nominated for a Grammy. By the age of 18, he had recorded 3 albums, the first won a Grammy and the other two were nominated for Grammy awards. Thereafter, Rodríguez returned to Puerto Rico where he joined Tommy Olivencia's group.

In 1980, Rodríguez "went solo," releasing his first studio album Simplemente... Lalo featuring the salsa classic "Tu No Sabes Querer" (You don't know how to love).

During the 1980s Rodriguez recorded a total of six albums. As a result of these recordings, he has been recognized as one of the pioneers of the subgenre of Romantic or Erotic Salsa which is described as having "light, frothy songs with erotic lyrics." "Rodriguez’s Ven Devórame Otra Vez (Come devour me once more), with its celebrated reference to moistened bed linen, was a prime example [of salsa romantica].” Rodríguez was awarded "Tropical Song of the Year" at the Lo Nuestro Awards in 1989 for the hit, "Ven, Devórame Otra Vez". The song charted #10 on the Hot Latin Tracks. Other late 1980s and early 1990s salsa romantica contemporaries include Eddie Santiago, Frankie Ruiz and Anthony Cruz. Rodriguez was known for a charismatic stage presence and he often interacted with his audience in the tradition of the great Cheo Feliciano.

== Later career ==
Throughout the early and mid 1990s, Rodríguez continued to record and produce new albums. In 1994, he was brought back to the Copacabana of New York by Chino Rodríguez, who became Rodríguez's manager for a short period and had Harvey Averne talk to Capitol EMI Latin to re-record Rodríguez with the project Nací Para Cantar, which sold RIAA Platinum. Rodríguez's final album to date, Estoy Aquí, was released in 1996.

After a long absence from recording, Rodríguez returned in the late 2000s with a new album entitled Con Todo Mi Corazon, an album that had not been released to the public as of 2013. On January 30, 2020, Rodríguez announced that the release of this album would officially happen later in the year, though an exact date had not been confirmed as of 2023.

== Personal life ==
=== Marriage and family ===
Rodríguez resided in Orlando, Florida for more than 20 years with his wife Wanda Torres, whom he married in 1986. The couple had four children, one of whom was adopted in 2006. In a 2020 interview with El Vocero, Rodríguez stated that he had filed for divorce from Torres and had relocated to Puerto Rico.

=== Legal issues ===
Throughout much of his career, Rodríguez had a history of drug and alcohol abuse, which led him to problems with his family and the law.

Rodríguez was arrested on March 20, 2011, and charged with domestic violence, accused of attempting to strangle his wife Wanda. He posted $1,500 shortly afterwards, but was arrested again in May for possession of cocaine and violating his restraining order by contacting his wife. In an interview with Primera Hora, Rodríguez recalled the events differently from what his wife had originally told the media, citing that he had accused her of infidelity and wanted a divorce (though both would ultimately reconcile). Rodríguez was eventually released in July and placed on two years of probation and drug rehabilitation.

=== Death ===
Rodríguez died in Carolina, Puerto Rico on December 13, 2022, at the age of 64. He was buried at the La Santa Cruz Cemetery in Carolina.

== Discography ==
=== Contributing artist ===
- 1974: The Sun of Latin Music (with Eddie Palmieri)
- 1975: Unfinished Masterpiece (with Eddie Palmieri)
- 1977: Fireworks (with Machito)

=== Studio albums ===
- 1980: Simplemente... Lalo
- 1982: Nuevamente... Lalo
- 1985: El Niño, el Hombre, el Soñador, el Loco
- 1987: Punto y Coma
- 1988: Un Nuevo Despertar
- 1989: Sexsacional..!
- 1992: De Vuelta en la Trampa
- 1994: Nací Para Cantar
- 1996: Estoy Aquí
- Con Todo Mi Corazon (unreleased)

=== Reissue albums ===
- 1990: Una Voz Para Escuchar (reissue of Nuevamente... Lalo)
- 1991: ¡Plena-Mente, Lalo! (reissue of El Niño, el Hombre, el Soñador, el Loco)
- 1992: Como Siempre Lalo (reissue of Punto y Coma)

=== Compilation albums ===
- 1981: Evolución
- 1981: Simplemente Lalo... Otra Vez
- 1994: Oro Salsero: 20 Éxitos
- 1995: Lalo Rodríguez y la Salsa Mayor
- 1997: Colección: Mi Historia
- 2000: Serie Sensacional
- 2002: Edicion Limitada
- 2003: Antologia
- 2004: Serie Top 10
- 2006: Pura Salsa
- 2008: The Greatest Salsa Ever
- 2013: 12 Favoritas
- 2015: Salsa Legends

== See also ==
- Salsa
- Salsa Romantica
- Music of Puerto Rico
- List of Puerto Ricans
- List of number-one Billboard Tropical Albums from the 1980s
