= Palmas (music) =

Style of handclapping used in flamenco music

Palmas is a handclapping style which plays an essential role in flamenco music. It used to help punctuate and accentuate the song and dance. Palmas can be a substitute for music, such as in the corrillo at the end of a show, and palmistas can assist the musicians by keeping a strong tempo, or the dancer by accentuating the end or beginning of a phrase. Palmas are also used in Brazilian music styles such as samba.

== Types of claps ==
It is important to be able to make two distinct types of hand claps. These are hard (fuertes, claras, secas) and soft (sordas). Each has a particular sound and is used at a particular time.

=== Fuertes ===
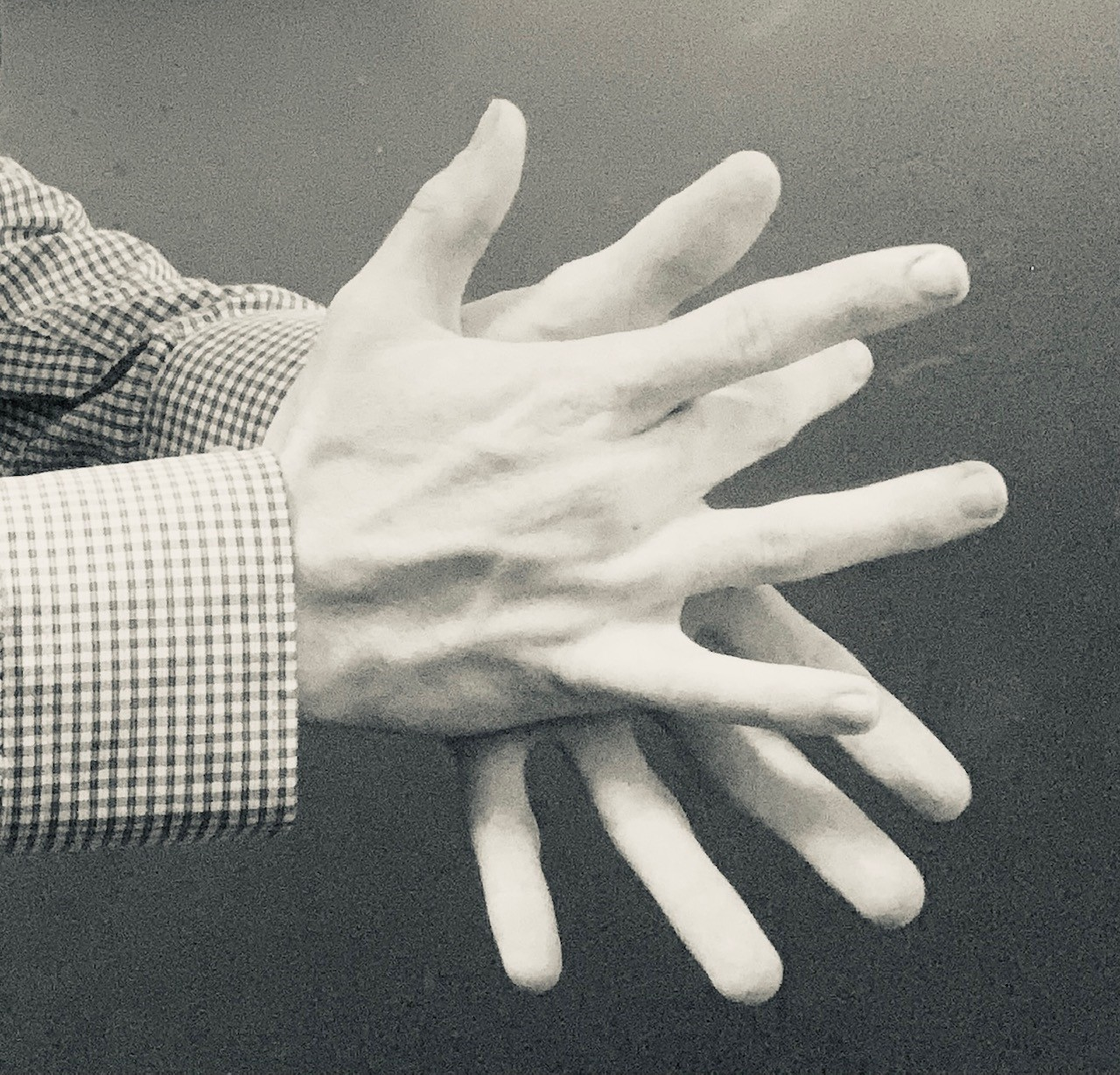
Palmas Sordas

Fuertes are used during intense and loud footwork or during loud musical pieces such as bulerías. The first three (or two) fingers of one hand are held firm and clapped into the outstretched palm of the other. The fingers of the striking hand should point roughly in line with the fingers on the other hand and hit in the bowl of the palm. This should result in a crisp, snappy sound.

=== Sordas ===
Sordas are used during guitar intros, during the singing so as not to drown it out, or during quieter dance phases so as not to distract the dancer. The hands are cupped softly so that the fingers of one hand fit snugly into the gap between the thumb and forefinger of the other so that when the hands are brought together, a muffled pop can be heard.

== Contra-tiempo ==
Contra-tiempo palmas is a way of clapping between the normal beats in a bar. For instance, filling the space between beats with another clap.
