= Mix in Spain =

Remix album by Azúcar Moreno
- Released: 1989
- Recorded: 1988, 1989
- Genre: Pop
- Length: 39:10
- Label: CBS-Epic
- Producer: Julio Palacios

Azúcar Moreno chronology
Carne De Melocotón (1988)	Mix in Spain (1989)	Bandido (1990)

Mix in Spain is a remix album by Spanish duo Azúcar Moreno, released on CBS-Epic in 1989.

Following the duo's breakthrough in 1989 with the house music remix of the track "Debajo Del Olivo", subtitled Mix in Spain, they released a full-length album with the same title, including the mainpart of the Carne De Melocotón album in dancefloor friendly re-interpretations with influences from contemporary music genres like acid house, hip hop and rap, featuring samples from tracks like M.A.R.R.S.' "Pump Up the Volume", Eric B. & Rakim's "Paid in Full" and beats from James Brown's "Funky Drummer". The album spawned three further remix singles; the re-released "Aunque Me Falte El Aire" (Lerele Mix), "Chica Vaivén" (Express Mix) and "Alerta Corazón" (Casablanca Mix).

Mix in Spain was released on vinyl and cassette but remains unreleased on CD and is out of print in all formats since the early 1990s.

== Track listing ==
Side A

1. "Aunque Me Falte El Aire" (Lerele Mix) - 5:35
2. "Me Pones Mala" (2 Bad Mix) - 4:38
3. "Debajo Del Olivo" (Mix in Spain) - 6:04
4. "Aunque Me Falte El Aire" (Dub Mix) - 3:50

Side B

1. "Alerta Corazón" (Casablanca Mix) - 5:45
2. "Chica Vaivén" (Express Mix) - 4:56
3. "Carne De Melocotón" (Eat a Peach Mix) - 4:47
4. "Debajo Del Olivo" (Dub Version) - 3:35

== Production ==
- Julio Palacios - record producer
- R.S.P (Rebeldes Sin Pausa) - remix and additional production

== Sources and external links ==
- Allmusic discography
- Discogs.com discography
- Rateyourmusic.com discography
