= Bandido (Azúcar Moreno song) =

1990 song by Azúcar Moreno

Single by Azúcar Moreno

from the album Bandido
- Language: Spanish
- Released: 1990
- Genre: New Flamenco; Tecno-rumba
- Length: 3:03
- Composer(s): Raúl Orellana; Jaime Stinus
- Lyricist(s): José Luis Abel

Eurovision Song Contest 1990 entry
- Country: Spain
- Artist(s): Antonia Salazar; Encarnación Salazar
- As: Azúcar Moreno
- Language: Spanish
- Composer(s): Raúl Orellana; Jaime Stinus
- Lyricist(s): José Luis Abel
- Conductor: Eduardo Leiva

Finals performance
- Final result: 5th
- Final points: 96

Entry chronology
- ◄ "Nacida para amar" (1989)
- "Bailar pegados" (1991) ►

Official performance video
- "Bandido" on YouTube

"Bandido" (Spanish pronunciation: [banˈdiðo]; "Bandit") is a song recorded by Spanish duo Azúcar Moreno –sisters Antonia and Encarnación Salazar–, with music composed by Raúl Orellana and Jaime Stinus, and lyrics written by José Luis Abel. It represented Spain in the Eurovision Song Contest 1990, placing fifth.

== Background ==
=== Conception ===
"Bandido" was composed by Raúl Orellana and Jaime Stinus with lyrics by José Luis Abel for Azúcar Moreno's fourth studio album Bandido. The song's studio recording includes the spoken intro "Ladies and gentlemen, it's showtime at the Apollo Theater. Everybody, the hardest-working man in show business", sampled from James Brown's 1963 album Live at the Apollo. Azúcar Moreno, were becoming popular by combining traditional Spanish flamenco roots with urban contemporary musical styles, in this case electronic music.

The song is about a "bandit", who stole the girls' love only to leave them with nothing except pain and sadness. The sisters beg the bandit to come back, to fulfill their longing for "dark passion", hoping that his love will be as fiery as a volcano. In the chorus, the sisters repeat that the bandit, with his eyes and lies, stole "the blood and life of [their hearts]."

=== Eurovision ===
Televisión Española (TVE) internally selected the song as its entrant for the 35th edition of the Eurovision Song Contest. For the song to participate in the contest, it was necessary to remove the spoken lyrics in the intro –as only original lyrics are allowed in the contest–, becoming one of the longest instrumental intros in Eurovision history –45 seconds of a total of three minutes–. TVE filmed a promo video with the duo singing the song in a studio, featuring images of paintings by Velázquez, that was distributed to the other participant broadcasters.

On 5 May 1990, the Eurovision Song Contest was held at the Vatroslav Lisinski Concert Hall in Zagreb hosted by Radiotelevizija Zagreb on behalf of Jugoslavenska radiotelevizija (JRT), and broadcast live throughout the continent. Azúcar Moreno performed "Bandido" first on the night, preceding Greece's "Horis Skopo" by Christos Callow and Wave. Eduardo Leiva conducted the event's orchestra in the performance of the Spanish entry.

At the end, "Bandido" finished in fifth place with 96 points. Germany was the only country to award Spain with twelve points, the highest amount possible from a country. This was however a considerably better result than the last time Spain sent a flamenco influenced song to the contest: in 1983 "¿Quién maneja mi barca?" by Remedios Amaya finished last with a total of zero points.

==== Technical difficulties ====
One notable aspect of the performance was due to a technical incident. Eduardo Leiva was unable to hear the backing track where some of the music was prerecorded, as the sound engineers had failed to raise the volume of the tape, and could not cue the orchestra to commence on time. When the volume was eventually raised the track was already partway through the song, meaning the orchestra and performers were out of sync with the tape, resulting in the two singers abruptly walking offstage in a huff, leaving viewers to wonder what had happened. After they left the stage, BBC commentator Terry Wogan remarked, "Let's hope it doesn't go on like this or we're in for a very long night, ladies and gentlemen." After two minutes, during which the arena became silent, the sisters returned and the song was then performed in its entirety without a hitch. This mishap did not affect them either positively or negatively since the juries had already voted based on the performances of the previous evening dress rehearsal. In 2003, BBC chose "Bandido", and all the events and difficulties surrounding the performance, as one of the most memorable moments in Eurovision history.

They also had problems with the clothing they were going to wear. Because the costumes designed especially for the performance by Francis Montesinos broke during rehearsals, they had to wear their own dresses bought at El Rastro flea market.

=== Aftermath ===
"Bandido" became a major club hit in the summer of 1990 not only in the Mediterranean countries but also the rest of Continental Europe and Scandinavia and the 12" Deep Mix, issued with a new promo video, was put on heavy rotation on music TV channels like MTV Europe and Super Channel. In 2005, "Bandido" was included in the Eurovision 50th anniversary CD/DVD box set Winners and classics.

== Chart success ==
"Bandido", as a single, remix, and album, propelled Azúcar Moreno to superstardom not only in Spain, but also in Europe and Latin America, where they continued to have success for the next decade.

== Covers ==
The song was covered by:

- Turkish singer Aşkın Nur Yengi, as "Zehir Gibisin" ("You're like a poison") in her second album, Hesap Ver ("Explain"), which was released in 1991;
- Dutch singer Paul de leeuw, as "Alleen maar de zon" ("Only the Sun") on his 1992 album Van U wil ik zingen.
