= Carne De Melocotón =

Studio album by Azúcar Moreno
- Released: 1988
- Recorded: 1988
- Genre: Pop
- Length: 37:08 (CD: 42:41)
- Label: CBS-Epic
- Producer: Julio Palacios

Azúcar Moreno chronology
| Estimúlame (1986) | Carne De Melocotón (1988) | Mix In Spain (1989) |

Professional ratings
Review scores
| Source | Rating |
|---|---|
| Allmusic | (not rated, no review) |

Carne De Melocotón is the third studio album by Spanish duo Azúcar Moreno, their debut for the CBS-Epic label. The album, whose title translates as Peach Flesh, was released in 1988 and saw the Salazár sisters embracing influences from contemporary pop, rock and dance music and arrangements with prominent use of synthesizers and drum machines, combined with a new bolder and sexier image. The lead single was "Aunque Me Falte El Aire" which also was their debut single on the UK market, then released under the title "Breathless". It was however a house music remix of the follow-up "Debajo Del Olivo" ("Under The Olive Tree") which became their breakthrough in Spain, and the track also became an underground club hit in Continental Europe and Scandinavia in early 1989. A full-length remix album entitled Mix In Spain followed that same year. The original album version of "Debajo Del Olivo" was included on the duo's first greatest hits album Mucho Azúcar - Grandes Éxitos, released in 1997.

Carne De Melocotón was released on CD in Spain in 1988, and then also included the Lerele remix of "Aunque Me Falte El Aire" as a bonus track. While certain tracks have re-surfaced on Sony Music compilations like Bandido Y Otros Exitos and Solo Azúcar, the original Carne De Melocotón album has been out of print in all formats ever since the early 1990s.

== Track listing ==
Side A

1. "Aunque Me Falte El Aire" - 3:39
2. "Chica Vaivén" - 3:39
3. "Alerta Corazón" - 3:28
4. "La Chulapona" - 3:26
5. "Carne De Melocotón" - 4:09

Side B

1. "Debajo Del Olivo" - 4:16
2. "Limón Amargo" - 2:39
3. "Labios De Amapola" - 4:33
4. "Me Pones Mala" - 3:16
5. "Fui" - 3:03

CD bonus track

11. "Aunque Me Falte El Aire" (Lerele Mix) - 5:33

== Sources and external links ==
- Allmusic discography
- Discogs.com discography
- Rateyourmusic.com discography
