= Los Chunguitos =

Spanish rumba flamenca group

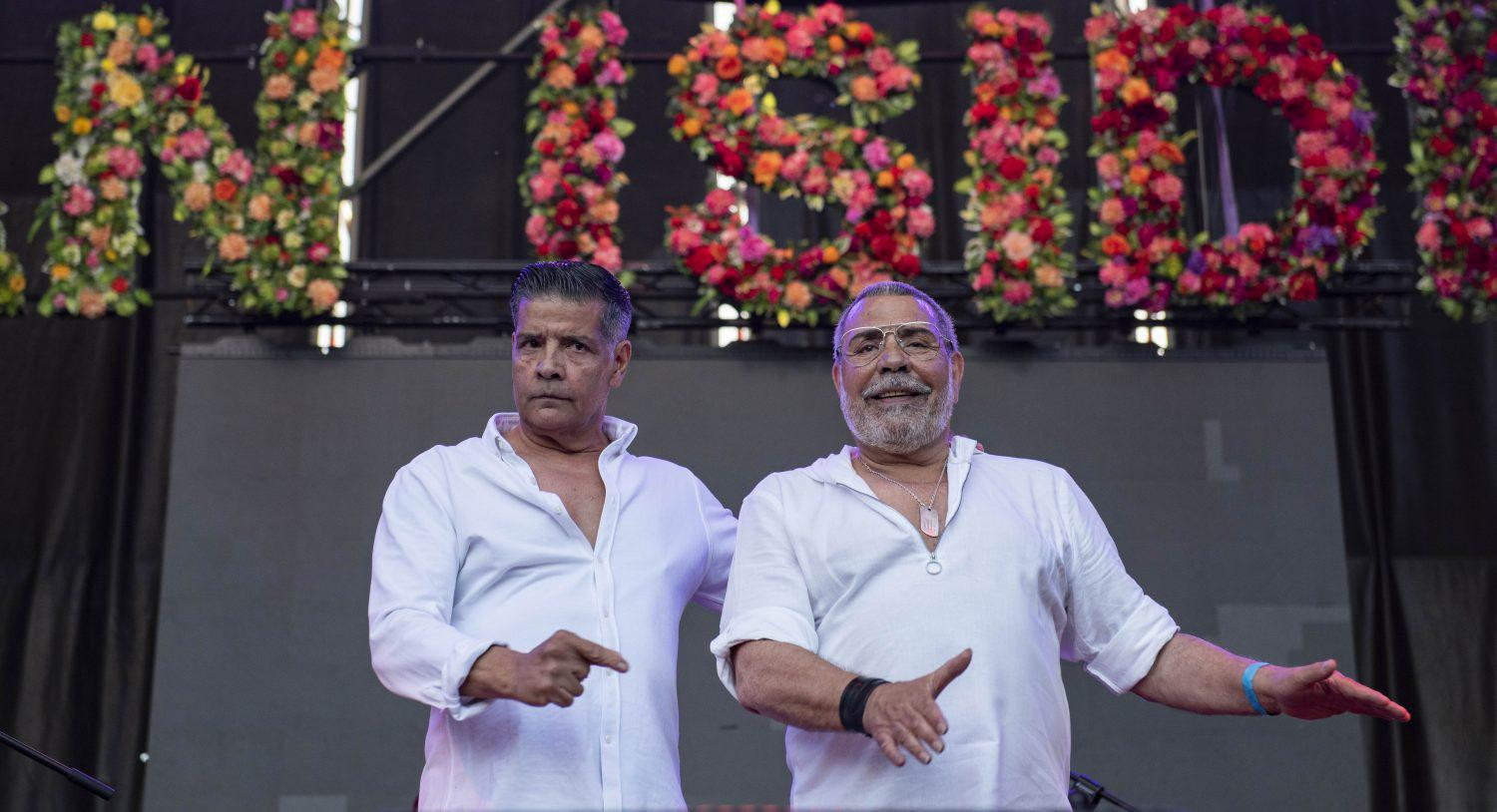
Los Chunguitos in 2019.

Los Chunguitos are a Spanish Romani rumba flamenca group from Badajoz, Extremadura, formed in Vallecas, Madrid in 1973.

The group's nucleus was the three brothers Juan (1954), Manuel (1962), and José Salazar (1957), whose uncle was the flamenco singer Porrina de Badajoz. Their sisters, Toñi and Encarna, sang backup and would later go on to success on their own as Azúcar Moreno.

The name "Los Chunguitos" comes from the pastime of throwing small stones at trains. They began as street buskers, playing in Madrid. In 1977, they auditioned at the offices of record label EMI, and producer Raul Ros convinced the label to sign them. They became hitmakers both in their own country and across Europe with songs such as "Dame veneno". They also appeared in the soundtracks to films such as Deprisa, Deprisa, Perros callejeros, and Días contados.

The group plays rumba flamenca influenced by Romani music and Catalan rumba. Their lyrics often touch on poverty and misfortune.

== Discography ==
- 1977 - Los Chunguitos
- 1978 - Vive Gitano
- 1979 - Limosna de amor
- 1980 - Pa ti pa tu primo
- 1981 - Sangre caliente
- 1982 - Barrio
- 1983 - Recuerdo de Enrique
- 1983 - Callejón sin salida
- 1984 - Vagando por ahí
- 1985 - Contra la pared
- 1986 - Después de la tormenta
- 1988 - Vive a tu manera (En Directo)
- 1989 - Tiempos dificiles
- 1990 - Baila con los Chunguitos
- 1991 - Plaza vieja
- 1992 - De pura sangre
- 1993 - ¡Marcha!
- 1993 - Noche de rumba
- 1995 - Zoraida
- 1996 - ¡Pa reventar!
- 1999 - Auténtico
- 2001 - La medalla
- 2003 - Morir de amor
- 2004 - Abre tu corazón
- 2006 - Buena suerte
- 2008 - La vida sigue (como Hermanos Salazar-Ex. Chunguitos)
- 2012 - Se escapa
- 2017 - Gavilán (Single)
- 2017-2018 - Dame veneno (Los Chunguitos y Lydia Lozano, Gustavo González, Patricia González)

== Compilations ==
- 1980 - Lo mejor de los Chunguitos
- 1984 - Cara a cara
- 1986 - Grandes éxitos
- 1992 - Pasión Gitana (1974-1992)
- 1997 - Por el aire va
- 2000 - Hoy-Sus 30 mejores canciones
- 2001 - Grandes éxitos
- 2004 - La rumba es nuestra (1973-2004)
- 2005 - Todo Chunguitos
- 2007 - Colección diamante
- 2015 - Canción dedicada al gol de James
