= Bandido (Azúcar Moreno album) =

Studio album by Azúcar Moreno
- Released: 1990
- Recorded: 1990
- Genre: Pop
- Length: 35:47
- Label: CBS-Epic
- Producers: Julio Palacios; Jaime Stinus; Raúl Orellana; Luis Carlos Esteban

Azúcar Moreno chronology
Mix In Spain (1989)	Bandido (1990)	The Sugar Mix Album (1990)

Professional ratings
Review scores
Source	Rating
Allmusic	4/5 stars

Bandido is the fourth studio album by Spanish duo Azúcar Moreno, released on CBS-Epic in 1990. The album became the Salazár sisters' international breakthrough.

The title track "Bandido" was chosen to represent Spain in the Eurovision Song Contest 1990, held in Zagreb, Yugoslavia. A house music anthem, co-written and produced by the well-known guitar player and producer Jaime Stinus and one of Spain's most prolific dance producers Raúl Orellana, complete with palmas and flamenco guitars, "Bandido" was turned down by the bookmakers before the contest since Spain's previous ethnic entries usually never fared well; in 1983 fellow flamenco singer Remedios Amaya's "¿Quién maneja mi barca?" had for example finished last with zero points. Despite this the song finished an honourable fifth and was given the full 12 points score from countries like West Germany and it became the starting point of Azúcar Moreno's international career. "Bandido" became a major club hit in the summer of 1990 not only in the Mediterranean countries but also the rest of Continental Europe and Scandinavia and the 12" Deep Mix, issued with a new promo video, was put on heavy rotation on music TV channels like MTV Europe and Super Channel. In Sweden the song was remixed by DJ Emil Hellman and re-issued on the Swemix label. The song has been covered in Turkish by singer Askin Nur Yengi under the title "Zehir Gibisin", in Dutch as "Alleen maar de zon" by Paul de Leeuw and the Deep Mix version of the song was recorded in Spanish by Serbian singer Ceca Raznatovic. In 2005 "Bandido" was included in the Eurovision 50th anniversary CD/DVD box set Winners and classics.

The Bandido album, which sold triple platinum in Spain, was the first to be released in most parts of the world, including Europe, the Middle East, South and Central America and later also Japan, Australasia and the United States, where it reached #3 on Billboard's Latin Pop chart. Bandido continued the musical development started on the preceding Carne De Melocotón by combining the sisters' typical ethnic vocal style with flamenco guitars and influences from contemporary rock, pop and dance music. Besides original material the album also included a number of cover versions of songs from a diverse range of genres, including Latin traditionals like "A Caballo" (also known as "El Carretero"), American jazz and mambo king Tito Puente's standard "Oye Como Va" coupled with Santana's "Guajira", Spanish Flamenco singer-songwriter Pepe de Lucía's "Rumba Rumba" - and even a house music/flamenco version of Mary Hopkin's 60's hit "Those Were the Days", originally a Russian folk melody.

The second single released from the album in Spain was a cover of Lalo Rodríguez' 80s hit "Ven Devórame Otra Vez" which became an even bigger success than "Bandido", reaching #9 on Billboard's Hot Latin Tracks chart, and today counts as one of the duo's signature tunes, they even re-recorded the track on their 2006 album Bailando Con Lola. Further singles from the album include "Oye Como Va" / "Guajira" and "A Caballo", all of which were also released as 12" dance remixes, these were later that same year collected on the duo's second remix compilation The Sugar Mix Album.

The original album versions of "Bandido", "Devórame Otra Vez", "Oye Como Va" / "Guajira" and "A Caballo" were all featured on Azúcar Moreno's first greatest hits album Mucho Azúcar - Grandes Éxitos, released in 1997.

Bandido was released on CD in 1990 and remains in print in most parts of the world.

== Track listing ==
1. "Bandido" (J. L. Abel/Raúl Orellana/J. Stinus) - 3:00
2. "Oye Como Va" / "Guajira" (Tito Puente) / (José Areas, David Brown, Rico Reyes) - 4:10
3. "Ven Devórame Otra Vez" (Palmer Hernández) - 5:34
4. "Mumaita" (J. M. Evoras, I. Muñoz) - 3:20
5. "No Me Digas Adios" (Carlos de France) - 3:25
6. "A Caballo" ("El Carretero", traditional arranged by M.A. Varona) - 3:58
7. "Cuando el Amor Se Va" ("Those Were the Days"/based on "Los Tempos Del Lirio" / "Ojos Negros") (Traditional, arranged by Luis Carlos Esteban. Lyrics: M. Mené) - 4:14
8. "Noche de Abril" (J. M. Evoras, I. Muñoz) - 3:04
9. "Canalla" (J. M. Evoras, I. Muñoz) - 3:09
10. "Rumba Rumba" (Pepe De Lucía) - 3:45

== Personnel ==
- Azúcar Moreno - vocals
- Gerardo Nuñez - flamenco guitars
- Rafael Riqueni - flamenco guitars ("Cuando el Amor Se Va")

== Production ==
- Julio Palacios - record producer, vocal arranger
- Jaime Stinus - record producer ("Bandido")
- Luis Carlos Esteban - record producer
- Raúl Orellana - record producer ("Bandido")
- Miguel Angel Varona - musical arranger, programming & musical director
- Luis Carlos Esteban - musical arranger, programming & musical director ("Cuando el Amor Se Va")
- Recorded at Cinearte, Sonoland & Tyrel Studios, Madrid
- Miguel De La Vega - sound engineer (Cinearte & Tyrel)
- Pepin Fernandez - sound engineer (Sonoland)
- Juan Gonzalez - assistant sound engineer
- Warren Mantooth - photography
- Acme - styling

== Sources and external links ==
- Allmusic discography
- Discogs.com discography
- Rateyourmusic.com discography
- deepmix discography
