= World's Hottest Tour =

2022 concert tour by Bad Bunny

- Continental tour by Bad Bunny
- Location: North America • South America
- Associated album: Un Verano Sin Ti
- Start date: August 5, 2022
- End date: December 10, 2022
- Legs: 2
- No. of shows: 32 in North America; 11 in South America; 43 total
- Attendance: 1,854,457
- Box office: $314 million

Bad Bunny concert chronology
- El Último Tour del Mundo (2022); World's Hottest Tour (2022); Most Wanted Tour (2024)

The World's Hottest Tour was the fourth concert tour by Puerto Rican rapper Bad Bunny and his first stadium tour, in support of his fourth studio album Un Verano Sin Ti (2022). DJs Alesso & Diplo were opening acts on select dates. The all-stadium tour included 43 concert dates in a span of four months.

Announced through his social media accounts on January 24, 2022, a few days before he began his tour of El Último Tour del Mundo, the stadium tour visited fourteen countries in the Americas. The tour consisted of two legs, the first in the United States and the second in Latin America. Following the announcement of the dates, many shows were quickly sold out and more dates were added.

The World's Hottest Tour was the third highest-grossing tour of 2022, with earnings of over $314 million dollars for the year's 43 shows and around 1.9 million ticket sales. It thus became the highest-grossing tour in history by a Latin American act at the time.

== Background ==
In early 2021, Bad Bunny announced his third concert tour El Ultimo Tour Del Mundo. The tour broke records in tickets sales and the date were sold out quickly. The tour grossed nearly $117 Million in North American Arenas and was the highest-grossing tour by a Latin artist in Billboard Boxscore history and selling over 575,000 tickets. Also, it was the fastest selling tour since 2018. El Ultimo Tour del Mundo was the top-selling album of 2021 in the United States and won Best Urban Music Album at the 22nd Annual Latin Grammy Awards and Best Música Urbana Album at the 64th Grammy Awards.

On January 24, 2022, Bad Bunny announced his upcoming stadium tour and album to be released sometime of that year via social media. The album, titled Un Verano Sin Ti, was released in May 2022 and debuted at number one on the Billboard 200, becoming the second all-Spanish language album to do so.

== Commercial reception ==
Initially, the first announcement of the tour was composed of 29 dates in total, including 17 in the United States in stadiums. Following the announcement, six more shows were added due the high demand of the tickets, including second dates on in Miami, Houston, Los Angeles, San Diego and Las Vegas.

For the Chile concerts, 80,000 tickets were sold out in minutes, however, over 1.6 millions of fans were waiting to buy tickets. In Santo Domingo, the first concert was sold out in its first day of sales, and a second date was added. In Peru, 400,000 fans were reported to be waiting online to buy tickets for the second date. In Costa Rica, the tickets were sold out within minutes of being released for sale. In Mexico City only, it is estimated that approximately 4.5 millions of fans queued to purchase one of the 115,000 tickets officially available, making it the concert tour with the biggest demand in the history of the country.

The first show at the Camping World Stadium in Orlando, was reported sold out and holds the record as the venue's highest-grossing show. When the tour started, 16 of 21 dates on the first leg in the United States were reported sold out, selling over 725,000 tickets. In August 2022, the tour grossed over US$91 million of dollars. In total, the World's Hottest Tour grossed $232.5 million and sold 944,000 tickets from just 21 shows in the U.S

== Ticketmaster México controversy ==
Prior to the first show in Mexico City, on December 9, 2022, what appeared to be a massive overselling of tickets through Ticketmaster caused many fans to be denied entry the day of the concert. Ticketmaster México claimed that an "unprecedented" number of counterfeit tickets were sold, which led to online overcrowding of the server and a subsequent crash of the operating system; consequentially, this fiasco delayed entrance to the venue for legitimate ticket-holders. The Office of the Federal Prosecutor for the Consumer (PROFECO) is seeking 100% compensation, plus a 20% added compensation for those affected.

== Set list ==
This set list is representative of the show on 5 August 2022 in Orlando. It is not representative of all concerts for the duration of the tour.

1. "Moscow Mule"
2. "Me Porto Bonito"
3. "Un Ratito"
4. "Efecto"
5. "Party"
6. "Tarot"
7. "La Corriente"
8. "Neverita"
9. "Ni Bien Ni Mal"
10. "La Romana"
11. "200 MPH"
12. "Estamos Bien"
13. "Te Boté (Remix)"
14. "I Like It"
15. "Si Veo a Tu Mamá"
16. "La Difícil"
17. "Bichiyal"
18. "La Santa"
19. "Vete"
20. "Yo Perreo Sola"
21. "Safaera"
22. "Tití Me Preguntó"
23. "Dakiti"
24. "Yo no soy Celoso"
25. "Aguacero"
26. "AM (Remix)"
27. "Yonaguni"
28. "Callaíta"
29. "Dos mil 16"
30. "Dile"
31. "No Te Hagas"
32. "Vuelve"
33. "Me Mata"
34. "No Metes Cabra"
35. "Chambea"
36. "Soy Peor"
37. "Un Verano Sin Ti"
38. "Un Coco"
39. "La Canción"
40. "Andrea"
41. "Me Fui de Vacaciones"
42. "Otro Atardecer"
43. "Ojitos Lindos"
44. "El Apagón"
45. "Después de la Playa"

== Tour dates ==
List of concerts showing date, city, country, venue, opening acts, attendance and revenue
Date (2022)	City	Country	Venue	Opening acts	Attendance	Revenue
Leg 1 – United States
August 5	Orlando	United States	Camping World Stadium	Alesso	47,670 / 47,670	$9,518,611
August 8	Cumberland	United States	Truist Park	Alesso	38,207 / 38,207	$8,678,799
August 12	Miami Gardens	United States	Hard Rock Stadium	Alesso	97,655 / 97,655	$21,900,878
August 13	Miami Gardens	United States	Hard Rock Stadium	Alesso	97,655 / 97,655	$21,900,878
August 18	Boston	United States	Fenway Park	Alesso	34,486 / 34,486	$7,003,692
August 20	Chicago	United States	Soldier Field	—N/a	50,854 / 50,854	$14,109,590
August 23	Washington, D.C.	United States	Nationals Park	Deorro	38,481 / 38,481	$7,936,521
August 27	New York City	United States	Yankee Stadium	Diplo	84,865 / 84,865	$22,757,636
August 28	New York City	United States	Yankee Stadium	Diplo	84,865 / 84,865	$22,757,636
September 1	Houston	United States	Minute Maid Park	Alesso	83,518 / 83,518	$19,557,149
September 2	Houston	United States	Minute Maid Park	Alesso	83,518 / 83,518	$19,557,149
September 4 (Note: The concert in Philadelphia on September 4, 2022, was part of the Made in America Festival.)	Philadelphia	United States	Benjamin Franklin Parkway	—N/a	—N/a	—N/a
September 7	San Antonio	United States	Alamodome	Alesso	50,193 / 50,193	$12,342,663
September 9	Arlington	United States	AT&T Stadium	Alesso	54,637 / 54,637	$12,384,432
September 14	Oakland	United States	RingCentral Coliseum	Alesso	42,702 / 42,702	$10,784,001
September 17	San Diego	United States	Petco Park	Alesso	79,123 / 79,123	$20,038,705
September 18	San Diego	United States	Petco Park	Alesso	79,123 / 79,123	$20,038,705
September 23	Las Vegas	United States	Allegiant Stadium	Alesso	92,440 / 92,440	$22,098,725
September 24	Las Vegas	United States	Allegiant Stadium	Alesso	92,440 / 92,440	$22,098,725
September 28	Phoenix	United States	Chase Field	Alesso	49,421 / 49,421	$11,176,255
September 30	Inglewood	United States	SoFi Stadium	Diplo	99,816 / 99,816	$31,096,479
October 1	Inglewood	United States	SoFi Stadium	Diplo	99,816 / 99,816	$31,096,479
Leg 2 – Latin America
October 21	Santo Domingo	Dominican Republic	Estadio Olímpico Félix Sánchez	—N/a	79,032 / 79,032	$7,738,992
October 22	Santo Domingo	Dominican Republic	Estadio Olímpico Félix Sánchez	—N/a	79,032 / 79,032	$7,738,992
October 28	Santiago	Chile	Estadio Nacional de Chile	Young Cister & Pailita; Pablito Pesadilla	110,362 / 110,362	$6,080,508
October 29	Santiago	Chile	Estadio Nacional de Chile	Pailita; Pablito Pesadilla	110,362 / 110,362	$6,080,508
November 4	Buenos Aires	Argentina	Estadio José Amalfitani	Dani Ribba; Rei	85,345 / 85,345	$5,588,125
November 5	Buenos Aires	Argentina	Estadio José Amalfitani	Dani Ribba; Rei	85,345 / 85,345	$5,588,125
November 11	Asunción	Paraguay	Estadio General Pablo Rojas	Milk Shake; Kaese	58,017 / 58,017	$2,107,935
November 13	Lima	Peru	Estadio Nacional del Perú	Tourista; DJ Towa; DJ Steve	83,086 / 83,086	$8,721,775
November 14	Lima	Peru	Estadio Nacional del Perú	Tourista; DJ Towa; DJ Steve	83,086 / 83,086	$8,721,775
November 16	Quito	Ecuador	Estadio Olímpico Atahualpa	—N/a	28,998 / 28,998	$2,997,726
November 18	Medellín	Colombia	Estadio Atanasio Girardot	DJ Agudelo888	80,393 / 80,393	$5,021,660
November 19	Medellín	Colombia	Estadio Atanasio Girardot	DJ Agudelo888	80,393 / 80,393	$5,021,660
November 20	Bogotá	Colombia	Estadio El Campín	DJ Agudelo888	35,178 / 35,178	$3,710,757
November 22	Panama City	Panama	Estadio Rommel Fernández	DJ Riki Silvera	27,085 / 27,085	$1,955,449
November 24	San José	Costa Rica	Estadio Nacional de Costa Rica	In Betwin; Jurgen Dorsam; DJ Tocuma	52,851 / 52,851	$4,450,577
November 26	San Salvador	El Salvador	Estadio Cuscatlán	—N/a	18,927 / 18,927	$1,513,890
November 29	San Pedro Sula	Honduras	Estadio Olímpico Metropolitano	—N/a	35,148 / 35,148	$2,263,224
December 1	Guatemala City	Guatemala	Explanada Cardales de Cayalá	Ale Q Ben Carrillo	20,005 / 20,005	$2,067,136
December 3	Monterrey	Mexico	Estadio BBVA	Mr. Pig	90,084 / 90,084	$17,456,717
December 4	Monterrey	Mexico	Estadio BBVA	Mr. Pig	90,084 / 90,084	$17,456,717
December 9	Mexico City	Mexico	Estadio Azteca	Uzielito Mix	115,878 / 115,878	$10,308,460
December 10	Mexico City	Mexico	Estadio Azteca	Uzielito Mix	115,878 / 115,878	$10,308,460
Total					1,864,457 / 1,864,457 (100%)	$314,445,480

== See also ==
- List of Billboard Boxscore number-one concert series of the 2020s
- List of highest-grossing concert series at a single venue
- List of highest-grossing concert tours by Latin artists
- List of most-attended concert series at a single venue
