= List of Billboard Hot Latin Songs chart achievements and milestones =

The Billboard logo

The Billboard Hot Latin Songs is a record chart in the United States for Latin singles, published weekly by Billboard magazine since September 6, 1986. The chart's methodology was only based on airplay from Spanish-language radio stations from its inception until the issue dated October 13, 2012, when Billboard updated its methodology to a multi-metric system, including sales of digital downloads and streaming activity in addition to airplay, as compiled by Nielsen SoundScan.

As of August 2026, the chart has had 470 different number-one singles, while 192 artists have reached number one as a lead or a featured act. Spanish singer Enrique Iglesias has the most number-one singles (27). Puerto Rican rapper Bad Bunny has the most weeks at number one (195), number-one debuting singles (8), top 10 singles (89), concurrent singles (29), and charting singles (192). He also has the most year-end singles at number one (4) and weeks at number one by calendar year (42).

"DTMF" by Bad Bunny is the longest-reigning single at number one (72 weeks). It surpassed "Despacito" by Puerto Rican singers Luis Fonsi and Daddy Yankee featuring Canadian singer Justin Bieber, the first song to spend at least 50 weeks at number one, and the longest-reigning song at number one (56 weeks) from 2017 to 2026. With "DTMF", "Dákiti", and "Me Porto Bonito", Bad Bunny is the first artist with more than two singles to spend least 20 weeks at number one.

"Propuesta Indecente" by Dominican-Puerto Rican singer Romeo Santos is the longest-running single to chart (125 weeks), becoming the first song to spend at least 70 weeks. With Dákiti, "DTMF", "Baile Inolvidable", "Eoo" and "Nuevayol", Bad Bunny is the first artist with more than two singles to spend more than 60 total weeks on the chart.

As of 2026, Bad Bunny is the chart's best-performing artist of all-time, followed by Enrique Iglesias and Mexican singer Luis Miguel. As of 2026, "Despacito" by Luis Fonsi and Daddy Yankee featuring Justin Bieber is the chart's best-performing song of all-time, followed by "Propuesta Indecente" by Romeo Santos, and "DTMF" by Bad Bunny.

== All-time achievements ==
=== Top 10 artists of all-time (1986–2026) ===
In 2016, for the 30th anniversary of Hot Latin Songs, Billboard magazine compiled a ranking of the 50 best-performing artists on the chart over the 30 years, along with the best-performing artists. Billboard has stated that "due to changes in chart methodology over the years, eras are weighted differently to account for chart turnover rates over various periods." The top was updated in 2018. It was also updated in September 2021. The latest update was published in October 2026.

Rank	Artist(s)	Ref.
1.	Bad Bunny	
2.	Enrique Iglesias	
3.	Luis Miguel	
4.	Daddy Yankee	
5.	Cristian Castro	
6.	Chayanne	
7.	Shakira	
8.	J Balvin	
9.	Marco Antonio Solís	
10.	Romeo Santos	

=== Top 10 songs of all-time (1986–2026) ===
In 2016, for the 30th anniversary of Hot Latin Songs, Billboard magazine compiled a ranking of the 50 best-performing songs on the chart over the 30 years, along with the best-performing artists. Billboard has stated that "due to changes in chart methodology over the years, eras are weighted differently to account for chart turnover rates over various periods." The top was updated in 2018. It was also updated in September 2021. The latest update was published in October 2026.

Rank	Single	Artist(s)	Year released	Peak and duration	Ref.
1.	"Despacito"	Luis Fonsi and Daddy Yankee featuring Justin Bieber	2017	#1 for 56 weeks	
2.	"Propuesta Indecente"	Romeo Santos	2013	#1 for 4 weeks	
3.	"DTMF"	Bad Bunny	2025	#1 for 72 weeks	
4.	"Dákiti"	Bad Bunny and Jhayco	2020	#1 for 27 weeks	
5.	"A Puro Dolor"	Son by Four	2000	#1 for 20 weeks	
6.	"Si Tú Supieras"	Alejandro Fernández	1997	#1 for 6 weeks	
7.	"Ritmo"	Black Eyed Peas and J Balvin	2019	#1 for 24 weeks	
8.	"No Me Doy por Vencido"	Luis Fonsi	2008	#1 for 19 weeks	
9.	"El Perdón"	Nicky Jam and Enrique Iglesias	2015	#1 for 30 weeks	
10.	"Me Porto Bonito"	Bad Bunny and Chencho	2022	#1 for 20 weeks	

=== Top 10 songs of the 21st century (2000–2024) ===
In 2025, Billboard magazine compiled a ranking of the 100 best songs on the Hot Latin Songs chart through the first quarter of the 21st century, from the start of 2000 to the end of 2024. The ranking is based on the weekly performance on the chart.

Rank	Single	Artist(s)	Year released	Peak and duration
1	"Despacito"	Luis Fonsi and Daddy Yankee featuring Justin Bieber	2017	No. 1 for 56 weeks
2	"Propuesta Indecente"	Romeo Santos	2013	No. 1 for 4 weeks
3	"Dákiti"	Bad Bunny and Jhayco	2020	No. 1 for 27 weeks
4	"A Puro Dolor"	Son by Four	2000	No. 1 for 20 weeks
5	"Ritmo"	Black Eyed Peas and J Balvin	2020	No. 1 for 24 weeks
6	"No Me Doy Por Vencido"	Luis Fonsi	2008	No. 1 for 19 weeks
7	"El Perdón"	Enrique Iglesias and Nicky Jam	2015	No. 1 for 30 weeks
8	"Me Porto Bonito"	Bad Bunny and Chencho	2022	No. 1 for 20 weeks
9	"La Tortura"	Shakira featuring Alejandro Sanz	2005	No. 1 for 25 weeks
10	"Te Quiero"	Flex	2007	No. 1 for 20 weeks

== Song milestones ==
=== Most weeks at number one ===
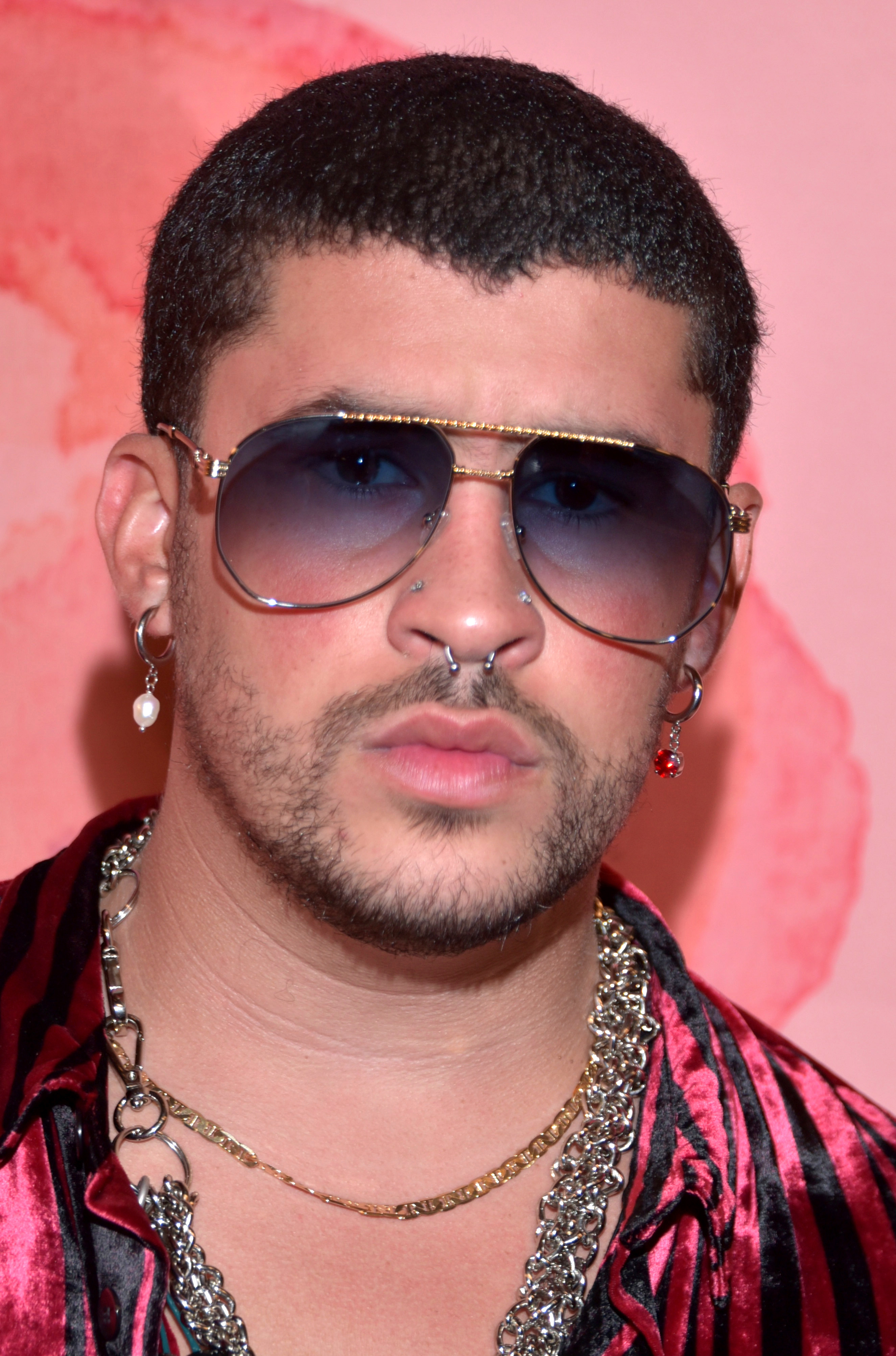
"DTMF" by Bad Bunny has the most charting weeks at number one.

The following list contains the longest-leading singles per number of weeks at number one on the chart:

Number of weeks	Single	Artist(s)	Span	Ref.
72	"DTMF"	Bad Bunny	2025–2026	
56	"Despacito"	Luis Fonsi and Daddy Yankee featuring Justin Bieber (Note: The original version of "Despacito" by Luis Fonsi featuring Daddy Yankee remained at number one for 12 weeks before the remix version featuring Justin Bieber was combined to the chart entry on May 6, 2017.)	2017–2018	
41	"Bailando"	Enrique Iglesias featuring Descemer Bueno and Gente de Zona	2014–2015	
30	"El Perdón"	Nicky Jam and Enrique Iglesias	2015	
27	"Dákiti"	Bad Bunny and Jhayco (Note: Jhayco was credited as Jhay Cortez, as the song was released prior to his name change in 2022.)	2020–2021	
26	"Pepas"	Farruko	2021–2022	
25	"La Tortura"	Shakira featuring Alejandro Sanz	2005	
24	"Ritmo"	Black Eyed Peas and J Balvin	2020	
22	"Ginza"	J Balvin	2015–2016	
20	"Me Porto Bonito"	Bad Bunny and Chencho	2022	
20	"Te Quiero"	Flex	2008	
20	"Me Enamora"	Juanes	2007–2008	
20	"A Puro Dolor"	Son by Four	2000	

=== Most weeks ===
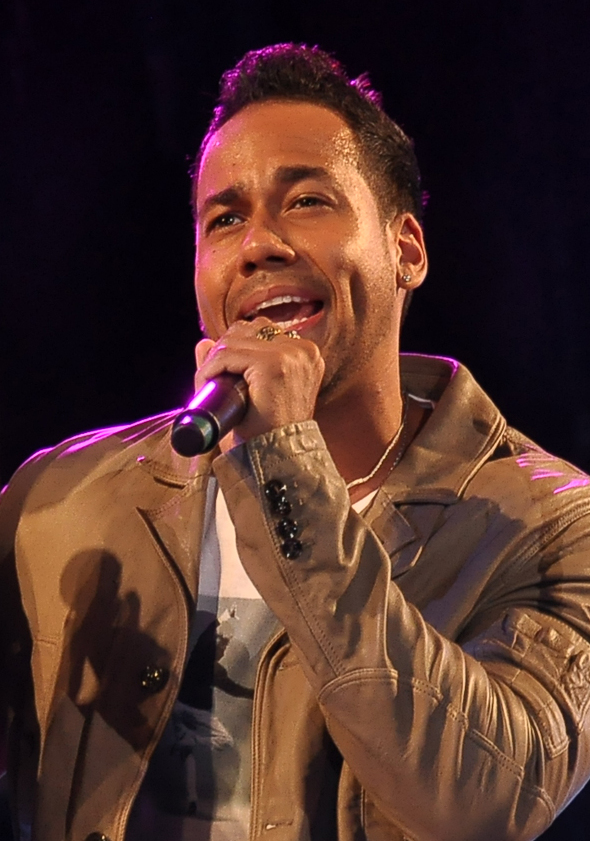
"Propuesta Indecente" by Romeo Santos has the most charting weeks in total.

The following list contains the longest-running singles per number of weeks on the chart: (Note: As of December 7, 2013, Billboard's recurrent rule removes any song from the chart if it has fallen below number 25 after spending 20 weeks, below number 10 after 26 weeks, or below number five after 52 weeks. The first measure is applied from October 20, 2012 onwards. Previously, descending songs were removed if ranking below number 20 after 20 weeks.)

Number of weeks	Single	Artist(s)	Span	Ref.
125	"Propuesta Indecente"	Romeo Santos	2013–2015	
110	"Despacito"	Luis Fonsi and Daddy Yankee featuring Justin Bieber	2017–2019	
91	"DTMF"	Bad Bunny	2025–2026	
83	"Eoo"	Bad Bunny	2025–2026	
79	"Dákiti"	Bad Bunny and Jhayco	2020–2021	
78	"Baile Inolvidable"	Bad Bunny	2025–2026	
78	"Nuevayol"	Bad Bunny	2025–2026	
62	"Incondicional"	Prince Royce	2012–2013	
61	"A Puro Dolor"	Son by Four	2000–2001	
60	"Mi Corazoncito"	Aventura	2007–2008	
59	"Amor Confuso"	Gerardo Ortíz	2012–2013	
58	"El Perdón"	Nicky Jam and Enrique Iglesias	2015–2016	
57	"Hasta El Amanecer"	Nicky Jam	2016–2017	
57	"Tu Cárcel"	Los Bukis	1987–1988	

== Artist achievements ==
=== Most songs at number one ===
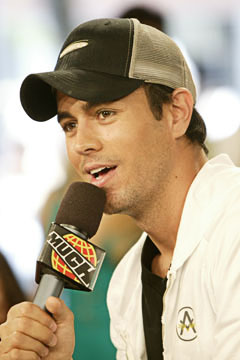
Enrique Iglesias the most number-one singles.

The following list contains the top artists per number of singles at number one on the chart:

Number of singles	Artist(s)	Longest-reigning single		Rest of singles (year; weeks)	Span	Ref.
Number of singles	Artist(s)	Single (year)	Weeks	Rest of singles (year; weeks)	Span	Ref.
27	Enrique Iglesias	"Bailando" (2014)	41	List: • "El Perdón" (2015; 30 weeks) • "Cuando Me Enamoro" (2010; 17 weeks) • "Duele El Corazón" (2016; 14 weeks) • "Enamorado Por Primera Vez" (1997; 12 week) • "Dímelo" (2007; 11 weeks) • "Solo En Ti" (1997; 10 weeks) • "Por Amarte" (1996; 9 weeks) • "Si Tu Te Vas" (1995; 8 weeks) • "Trapecista" (1996; 5 weeks) • "Ritmo Total" [Rhythm Divine] (1998; 4 weeks) • "Esperanza" (1998; 4 weeks) • "Miente" (1997; 4 weeks) • "Loco" (2013; 3 weeks) • "Donde Están Corazón" (2008; 3 weeks) • "Experiencia Religiosa" (1996; 3 weeks) • "Lloro Por Ti" (2008; 2 weeks) • "El Perdedor" (2013; 1 week) • "No Me Digas Que No" (2010; 1 week) • "Gracias A Ti" (2009; 1 week) • "Para Que La Vida" (2003; 1 week) • "Quizás" (2002; 1 week) • "Mentiroso" (2002; 1 week) • "Héroe" (2001; 1 week) • "Bailemos" (1999; 1 week) • "Nunca Te Olvidaré" (1999; 1 week) • "No Llores Por Mi" (1996; 1 week)	1995–2016	
17	Bad Bunny	"DTMF" (2025)	72	List: • "Dakiti" (2020; 27 weeks) • "Me Porto Bonito" (2022; 20 weeks) • "MIA" (2018; 16 weeks) • "Titi Me Pregunto" (2022; 14 week) • "Te Bote" (2018; 14 weeks) • "Monaco" (2023; 10 weeks) • "Yonaguni" (2021; 5 weeks) • "Un Dia (One Day)" (2020; 5 weeks) • "Vete" (2019; 4 weeks) • "Baile Inolvidable" (2025; 2 weeks) • "Nuevayol" (2025; 1 week) • "Gently" (2023; 1 week) • "Moscow Rule" (2022; 1 week) • "Volví" (2021; 1 week) • "Si Veo A Tu Mamá" (2020; 1 week) • "La Canción" (2019; 1 week)	2018–2025	
16	Luis Miguel	"Tengo Todo Excepto a Ti" (1990)	8	List: • "Si Nos Dejan" (1995; 7 weeks) • "No Se Tu" (1992; 7 weeks) • "La Conditional" (1989; 7 weeks) • "El Día Que Me Quieras" (1994; 5 week) • "Inolvidable" (1991; 5 weeks) • "Por Debajo De La Mesa" (1997; 4 weeks) • "La Media Vuelta" (1994; 3 weeks) • "Hasta Que Me Olvides" (1993; 3 weeks) • "Ayer" (1993; 3 weeks) • "Fría como el viento" (1989; 3 weeks) • "Ahora Te Puedes Marchar" (1987; 3 weeks) • "Te Necesito" (2003; 2 weeks) • "Como Duele" (2001; 2 weeks) • "O Tu O Ninguna" (1999; 1 week) • "Entrégate" (1990; 1 week)	1987–2003	
15	Gloria Estefan	"Mi Tierra" (1993) "En El Jardín" (1997)	6	List: • "Si voy a perderte" (1989; 5 weeks) • "Hoy" (2003; 4 weeks) • "Con Los Años Que Me Quedan" (1993; 4 week) • "No Llores" (2007; 2 weeks) • "Como Me Duele Perderte" (2000; 2 weeks) • "Abriendo Puertas" (1995; 2 weeks) • "Mi Buen Amor" (1994; 2 weeks) • "Hotel Nacional" (2012; 1 week) • "Tu Fotografía" (2004; 1 week) • "No Me Dejes De Querer" (2000; 1 week) • "Oye" (1998; 1 week) • "No Pretendo" (1997; 1 week) • "Más Allá" (1995; 1 week)	1989–2012	
13	Shakira	"La Tortura" (2005)	25	List: • "Chantaje" (2016; 11 weeks) • "Hips Don’t Lie" (2006; 8 weeks) • "Suerte [Whenever, Wherever]" (2001; 7 week) • "TQG" (2023; 5 weeks) • "Bzrp Music Sessions, Vol. 53" (2023; 5 weeks) • "Loba" (2009; 5 weeks) • "Ciega, Sordomuda" (1998; 3 weeks) • "Mi Verdad" (2015; 1 week) • "Loca" (2010; 1 week) • "Te Lo Agradezco, Pero No" (2007; 1 week) • "Que Me Quedes Tu" (2002; 1 week) • "Tu" (1999; 1 week)	1998–2023	
11	Karol G	"Si Antes Te Hubiera Conocido" (2024)	14	List: • "China" (2019; 12 weeks) • "MAMIII" (2022; 10 weeks) • "Bby Wow" (2026; 5 weeks) • "Qlona" (2020; 5 weeks) • "TQG" (2023; 5 weeks) • "Tusa" (2019; 4 weeks) • "Dame Tu Cosita" (2018; 2 weeks) • "Ahí" (2026; 1 week) • "Mi Ex Tenia Razon" (2023; 1 week) • "Provenza" (2022; 1 week)	2018–2026	
11	Marco Antonio Solís (Note: Marco Antonio Solís has four additional number-ones and 10 top 10 songs as member of Los Bukis.)	"Qué Pena Me Das" (1996)	10	List: • "Recuerdos, Tristeza Y Soledad" (1996; 8 weeks) • "Una Mujer Como Tu" (1995; 6 weeks) • "Ojala" (2007; 3 weeks) • "Si Te Pudiera Mentir" (1999; 3 weeks) • "Así Como Te Conocí" (1996; 3 weeks) • "El Perdedor" (2013; 1 week) • "Más Que Tu Amigo" (2003; 1 week) • "Tu Amor O Tu Desprecio" (2001; 1 week) • "O Me Voy O Te Vas" (2003; 1 week) • "La Venia Bendita" (1997; 1 week)	1995–2014	
11	Ricky Martin	"Tal Vez" (2003)	11	List: • "Livin' La Vida Loca" (1999; 9 weeks) • "Solo Quiero Amarte" (2001; 4 week) • "Te Recuerdo" (2006; 3 weeks) • "Bella [She's All I Ever Had]" (1999; 3 weeks) • "Lo Mejor De Mi Vida Eres Tu" (2010; 2 weeks) • "Vuelve" (1998; 2 weeks) • "Y Todo Queda en Nada" (2003; 1 week) • "Jaleo" (2003; 1 week) • "She Bangs" (2000; 1 week) • "Perdido Sin Ti" (1998; 1 week)	1998–2011	
10	Maná	"Labios Compartidos" (2006) "Lluvia Al Corazón" (2011)	8	List: • "Labios Compartidos" (2006; 8 weeks) • "El Verdadero Amor Perdona" (2011; 4 weeks) • "Bendita Tu Luz" (2006; 4 weeks) • "Si No Te Hubieras Ido" (2008; 2 weeks) • "Mi Verdad" (2015; 1 week) • "Hasta Que Te Conocí" (2012; 1 week) • "Amor Clandestino" (2011; 1 week) • "Manda Una Señal" (2007; 1 week) • "Mariposa Traicionera" (2003; 1 week)	2003–2015	
10	Wisin & Yandel (Note: Wisin has one additional number-one song as a solo act.)	"Algo Me Gusta de Ti" (2012)	14	List: • "Follow The Leader" (2012; 2 weeks) • "Llame Pa' Verte" (2005; 2 weeks) • "Tu Olor" (2011; 1 week) • "No Me Digas Que No" (2010; 1 week) • "Gracias A Ti" (2009; 1 week) • "Abusadora" (2009; 1 week) • "Me Estas Tentando" (2008; 1 week) • "Sexy Movimiento" (2007; 1 week) • "Pam Pam" (2006; 1 week)	2006–2013	
9	Chayanne	"Y Tú Te Vas" (2002)	7	List: • "Yo Te Amo" (2000; 5 weeks) • "Dejaría Todo" (1998; 5 weeks) • "Completamente Enamorados" (1990; 5 weeks) • "Fuiste Un Trozo De Hielo En La Escarcha" (1989; 4 weeks) • "Cuidarte El Alma" (2003; 3 weeks) • "El Centro De Mi Corazon" (1992; 2 weeks) • "Si Nos Quedara Poco Tiempo" (2007; 1 week) • "Un Siglo Sin Ti" (2003; 1 week)	1989–2007	
9	J Balvin	"Ritmo" (2020)	24	List: • "Ginza" (2015; 22 weeks) • "China" (2019; 12 weeks) • "Mi Gente" (2017; 12 weeks) • "Un Dia (One Day)" (2020; 5 weeks) • "X" (2018; 2 weeks) • "La Canción" (2019; 1 week) • "Bobo" (2016; 1 week) • "Ay Vamos" (2014; 1 week)	2014–2020	
8	Juanes	"Me Enamora" (2007)	20	List: • "Nada Valgo Sin Tu Amor" (2004; 12 weeks) • "La Camisa Negra" (2005; 8 weeks) • "Fotografia" (2003; 5 weeks) • "Gotas De Agua Dulce" (2008; 3 weeks) • "Volverte A Ver" (2005; 3 weeks) • "La Senal" (2012; 1 week) • "Yerbatero" (2010; 1 week)	2003–2012	
8	Marc Anthony	"Vivir Mi Vida" (2013)	17	List: • "No Me Ames" (1999; 7 weeks) • "Dímelo" (1999; 5 weeks) • "Y Hubo Alguien" (1997; 4 weeks) • "Muy Dentro De Mi" (2000; 2 weeks) • "Ahora Quien" (2004; 2 weeks) • "Por Que Les Mientes?" (2012; 1 week) • "Rain Over Me" (2011; 1 week)	1997–2012	

=== Most weeks at number one ===
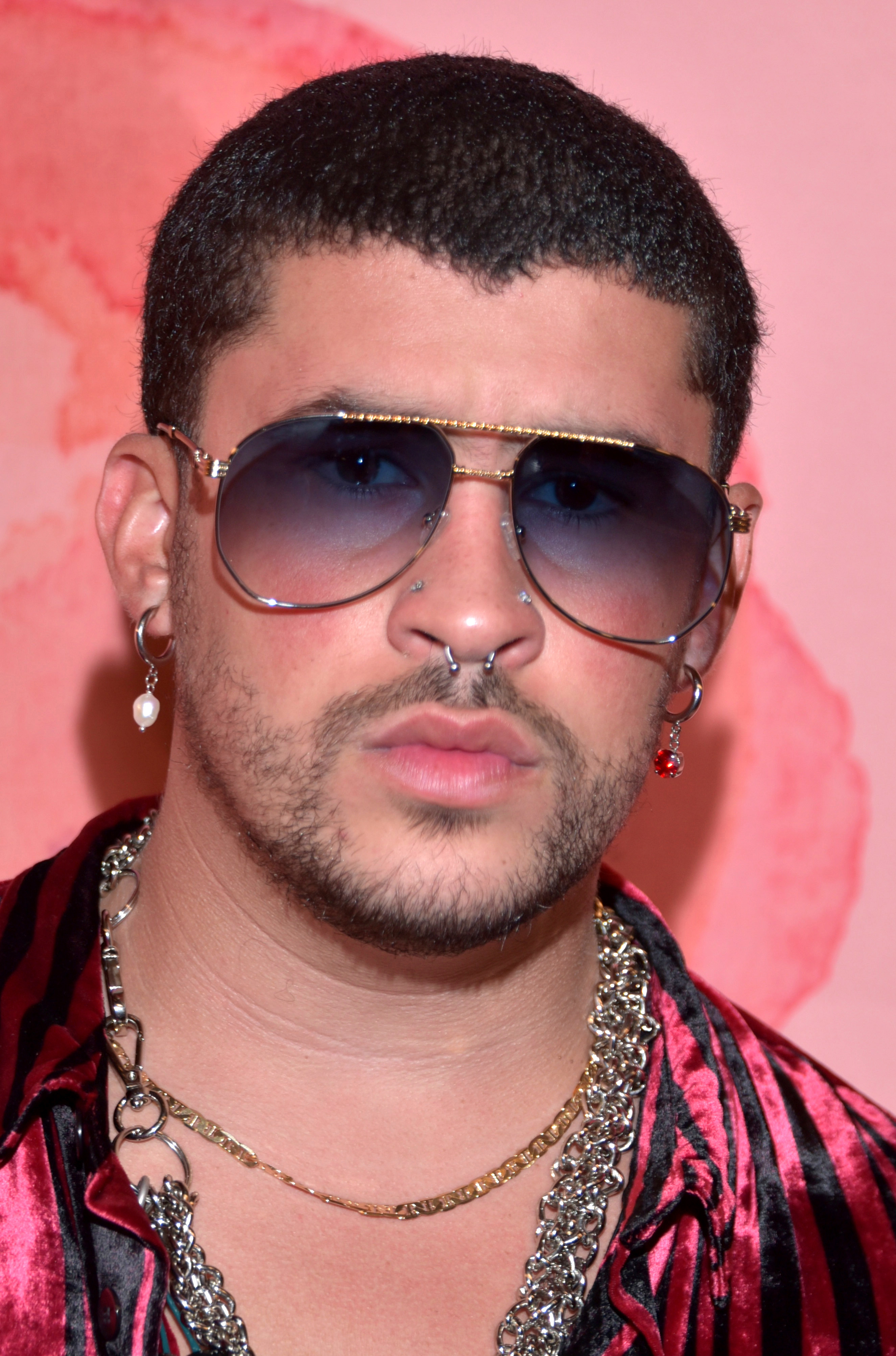
Bad Bunny has the most number-one weeks (193), number-one debuting singles (8), top 10 singles (89), concurrent singles (29), charting singles (190), and number-one end-year songs (4).

The following list contains the top artists per number of weeks at number one on the chart:

Number of weeks	Artist(s)	Longest-reigning single		Rest of singles (year; weeks)	Span	Ref.
Number of weeks	Artist(s)	Single (year)	Weeks	Rest of singles (year; weeks)	Span	Ref.
195	Bad Bunny	"DTMF" (2025)	72	List: • "Dakiti" (2020; 27 weeks) • "Me Porto Bonito" (2022; 20 weeks) • "MIA" (2018; 16 weeks) • "Titi Me Pregunto" (2022; 14 week) • "Te Bote" (2018; 14 weeks) • "Monaco" (2023; 10 weeks) • "Yonaguni" (2021; 5 weeks) • "Un Dia (One Day)" (2020; 5 weeks) • "Vete" (2019; 4 weeks) • "Baile Inolvidable" (2025; 2 weeks) • "Nuevayol" (2025; 1 week) • "Gently" (2023; 1 week) • "Moscow Rule" (2022; 1 week) • "Volví" (2021; 1 week) • "Si Veo A Tu Mamá" (2020; 1 week) • "La Canción" (2019; 1 week)	2018–2025	
189	Enrique Iglesias	"Bailando" (2014)	41	List: • "El Perdón" (2015; 30 weeks) • "Cuando Me Enamoro" (2010; 17 weeks) • "Duele El Corazón" (2016; 14 weeks) • "Enamorado Por Primera Vez" (1997; 12 week) • "Dímelo" (2007; 11 weeks) • "Solo En Ti" (1997; 10 weeks) • "Por Amarte" (1996; 8 weeks) • "Si Tu Te Vas" (1995; 8 weeks) • "Trapecista" (1996; 5 weeks) • "Ritmo Total" [Rhythm Divine] (1998; 4 weeks) • "Esperanza" (1998; 4 weeks) • "Miente" (1997; 4 weeks) • "Loco" (2013; 3 weeks) • "Donde Están Corazón" (2008; 3 weeks) • "Experiencia Religiosa" (1996; 3 weeks) • "Lloro Por Ti" (2008; 2 weeks) • "El Perdedor" (2013; 1 week) • "No Me Digas Que No" (2010; 1 week) • "Gracias A Ti" (2009; 1 week) • "Para Que La Vida" (2003; 1 week) • "Quizás" (2002; 1 week) • "Mentiroso" (2002; 1 week) • "Héroe" (2001; 1 week) • "Bailemos" (1999; 1 week) • "Nunca Te Olvidaré" (1999; 1 week) • "No Llores Por Mi" (1996; 1 week)	1995–2016	
117	Daddy Yankee	"Despacito" (2017)	56	List: • "Limbo" (2012; 15 weeks) • "Rompe" (2005; 15 week) • "Con Calma" (2019; 14 weeks) • "China" (2019; 12 weeks) • "Shaky Shaky" (2016; 4 weeks) • "Lovumba" (2011, 1 week)	2005–2019	
82	Luis Fonsi	"Despacito" (2017)	56	List: • "No Me Doy Por Vencido" (2008; 19 weeks) • "Aquí Estoy Yo" (2009; 2 week) • "Imagíname Sin Ti" (2000; 1 week) • "Tu Amor" (2006; 1 week) • "Na Es Para Siempre" (2005; 1 week) • "Abrazar La Vida" (2004, 1 week)	2000–2017	
80	J Balvin	"Ritmo" (2020)	24	List: • "Ginza" (2015; 22 weeks) • "China" (2019; 12 weeks) • "Mi Gente" (2017; 12 weeks) • "Un Dia (One Day)" (2020; 5 weeks) • "X" (2018; 2 weeks) • "La Canción" (2019; 1 week) • "Bobo" (2016; 1 week) • "Ay Vamos" (2014; 1 week)	2014–2020	
74	Shakira	"La Tortura" (2005)	25	List: • "Chantaje" (2016; 11 weeks) • "Hips Don’t Lie" (2006; 8 weeks) • "Suerte [Whenever, Wherever]" (2001; 7 week) • "TQG" (2023; 5 weeks) • "Bzrp Music Sessions, Vol. 53" (2023; 5 weeks) • "Loba" (2009; 5 weeks) • "Ciega, Sordomuda" (1998; 3 weeks) • "Mi Verdad" (2015; 1 week) • "Loca" (2010; 1 week) • "Te Lo Agradezco, Pero No" (2007; 1 week) • "Que Me Quedes Tu" (2002; 1 week) • "Tu" (1999; 1 week)	1998–2023	
67	Nicky Jam	"El Perdón" (2015)	30	List: • "Hasta El Amanecer" (2016; 18 weeks) • "Te Bote" (2018; 14 weeks) • "Otro Trago" (2019; 3 weeks) • "X" (2018; 2 weeks)	2015–2019	
60	Karol G	"Si Antes Te Hubiera Conocido" (2024)	14	List: • "China" (2019; 12 weeks) • "MAMIII" (2022; 10 weeks) • "Bby Wow" (2026; 5 weeks) • "Qlona" (2020; 5 weeks) • "TQG" (2023; 5 weeks) • "Tusa" (2019; 4 weeks) • "Dame Tu Cosita" (2018; 2 weeks) • "Ahí" (2026; 1 week) • "Mi Ex Tenia Razon" (2023; 1 week) • "Provenza" (2022; 1 week)	2019–2026	
59	Luis Miguel	"Tengo Todo Excepto a Ti" (1990)	8	List: • "Si Nos Dejan" (1995; 7 weeks) • "No Se Tu" (1992; 7 weeks) • "La Conditional" (1989; 7 weeks) • "El Día Que Me Quieras" (1994; 5 week) • "Inolvidable" (1991; 5 weeks) • "Por Debajo De La Mesa" (1997; 4 weeks) • "La Media Vuelta" (1994; 3 weeks) • "Hasta Que Me Olvides" (1993; 3 weeks) • "Ayer" (1993; 3 weeks) • "Fría como el viento" (1989; 3 weeks) • "Ahora Te Puedes Marchar" (1987; 3 weeks) • "Te Necesito" (2003; 2 weeks) • "Como Duele" (2001; 2 weeks) • "O Tu O Ninguna" (1999; 1 week) • "Entrégate" (1990; 1 week)	1987–2003	
56	Ana Gabriel (Note: Ana Gabriel's total weeks at number one includes a 1991 collaboration with Vikki Carr, "Cosas del Amor", which Billboard counts separately by mistakenly crediting them as a duo.)	"Ay Amor" (1987)	14	List: • "Evidencias" (1992; 10 weeks) • "Es Demasiado Tarde" (1990; 10 weeks) • "Cosas Del Amor" (1998; 10 weeks) • "Quien Como Tu" (1990; 7 week) • "Luna" (1993; 3 weeks) • "Simplemente Amigos" (1989; 2 weeks)	1987–1998	
53	Juanes	"Me Enamora" (2007)	20	List: • "Nada Valgo Sin Tu Amor" (2004; 12 weeks) • "La Camisa Negra" (2005; 8 weeks) • "Fotografia" (2003; 5 weeks) • "Gotas De Agua Dulce" (2008; 3 weeks) • "Volverte A Ver" (2005; 3 weeks) • "La Senal" (2012; 1 week) • "Yerbatero" (2010; 1 week)	2003–2012	

=== Most debuts at number one ===
The following list contains the top artists per number of debuting singles at number one on the chart:

Number of singles	Artist(s)	Longest-reigning single		Rest of singles (year; weeks)	Span	Ref.
Number of singles	Artist(s)	Single (year)	Weeks	Rest of singles (year; weeks)	Span	Ref.
8	Bad Bunny	"Dakiti" (2020)	27	List: • "Mónaco" (2023, 10 weeks) • "Yonaguni" (2021; 5 weeks) • "Un Día (One Day)" (2020; 5 weeks) • "Nuevayol" (2025; 1 week) • "Gently" (2023; 1 week) • "Moscow Mule" (2022; 1 week) • "Si Veo A Tu Mamá" (2020; 1 weeks)	2020–2025	
5	Karol G	"Mamiii" (2022)	10	List: • "TQG" (2023; 5 weeks) • "Tusa" (2019, 4 weeks) • "Ahí" (2026; 1 week) • "Mi Ex Tenía Razón" (2023; 1 week)	2019–2026	
3	Maná	"Lluvia al Corazón" (2011) "Labios Compartidos" (2006)	11	List: • "Mi Verdad" (2015; 1 week)	2006–2015	
3	Shakira	"Chantaje" (2016)	11	List: • "TQG" (2023; 5 weeks) "Mi Verdad" (2015; 1 week)	2015–2023	
2	Enrique Iglesias	"Enamorado Por Primera Vez" (1997)	12	List: • "Solo En Ti" (1997; 10 weeks)	1997	

=== Most songs in top 10 ===
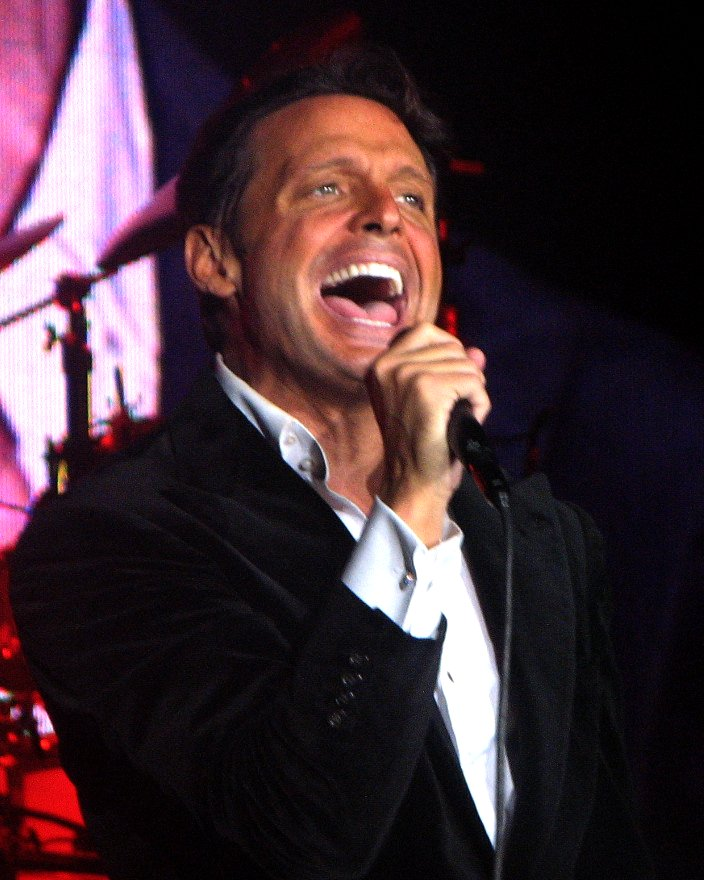
Luis Miguel held the record for the most top 10 singles for 24 years from 1997 to 2021.

The following list contains the top artists per singles within the top 10 on the chart:

Number of singles	Artist	Longest-charting single		Span	Ref.
Number of singles	Artist	Single (year)	Weeks	Span	Ref.
89	Bad Bunny	"DTMF" (2025)	85	2017–2025	
39	Luis Miguel	"Ahora Te Puedes Marchar" (1987)	34	1987–2005	
39	Enrique Iglesias	"El Perdón" (2015)	56	1995–2020	
38	Karol G	"Qlona" (2023)	45	2019–2026	
37	Daddy Yankee	"Despacito" (2017)	110	2005–2022	
37	Shakira	"Chantaje" (2016)	47	1998–2024	
36	J Balvin	"Mi Gente" (2017)	56	2014–2025	
29	Cristian Castro	"Por Amarte Así" (2000)	32	1992–2009	
29	Chayanne	"Y Tú Te Vas" (2002)	33	1987–2014	
29	Ozuna (Note: Billboard mistakenly credits Ozuna with 27 top 10 songs due to his feature on the remix of "Bonita" (2017), whose combined chart entries with the original version retroactively credited all guest artists. The original version by Jowell & Randy and J Balvin peaked at number eight on November 4, 2017, while the remix was released on December 22 and subsequently peaked at number 14 on December 23.)	"Te Boté" (2018)	52	2017–2024	
28	Marc Anthony	"Vivir Mi Vida" (2013)	54	1994–2021	
27	Ricky Martin	"Tu Recuerdo" (2006)	35	1992–2017	
27	Marco Antonio Solís	"Más Que Tu Amigo" (2004)	47	1994–2014	

=== Most concurrent songs ===
The following list contains the top artists per simultaneous singles on the chart:

Number of singles	Artist(s)	Single rank and title (year)	Dated week	Ref.
29	Bad Bunny	List: 1). "DTMF" (2025) 2). "Baile Inolvidable" (2025) 3). "Nuevayol" (2025) 4). "Titi Me Preguntó" (2022) 5). "Eoo" (2025) 6). "Voy a llevarte Pa' PR" (2025) 7). "La Canción" (2019) 8). "Monaco" (2023) 9). "Velda" (2025) 10). "Que Pasaría…" (2025) 11). "Dakiti" (2020) 12). "Me Porto Bonito" (2022) 13). "Safaera" (2020) 14). "Cafe Con Ron" (2025) 15). "Weltita" (2025) 16). "La Mudanza" (2025) 17). "Perfumito Nuevo" (2025) 18). "Kloufrens" (2025) 19). "Yo Perreo Sola" (2020) 20). "Moscow Mule" (2022) 21). "Lo Que Le Pasó A Hawaii" (2025) 22). "El Club" (2025) 23). "Party" (2022) 24). "Ketu Tecre" (2025) 25). "Turista" (2025) 26). "Bokete" (2025) 28). "Pitorro de Coco" (2025) 29). "El Apagón" (2022) 31). "Super Bowl LX Halftime Show (Live)" (2026)	February 21, 2026	
25	Peso Pluma	List: 1). "Ella Baila Sola" (2023) 2). "La Bebe" (2021) 5). "Luna" (2023) 6). "Lady Gaga" (2023) 9). "Bye" (2023) 10). "VVS" (2023) 11). "Bzrp Music Sessions, Vol. 55" (2023) 12). "Rubicon" (2023) 14). "PRC" (2023) 15). "Por Las Noches" (2025) 16). "El Azul" (2021) 17). "Nueva Vida" (2023) 19). "Lagunas" (2023) 20). "Rosa Pastel" (2023) 21). "Carnal" (2025) 22). "Peblada" (2023) 24). "Gavilán II" (2023) 26). "Chanel" (2025) 27). "77" (2023) 28). "Zapata" (2023) 29). "Su Casa" (2023) 33). "La People" (2023) 38). "Las Morras" (2023) 45). "El Tsurito" (2025) 50). "Ando Enfocado" (2022)	July 8, 2023	
24	Bad Bunny	List: 1). "Monaco" (2023) 2). "Fina" (2023) 3). "Perro Negro" (2023) 4). "Nadie Sabe" (2023) 5). "Hibiki" (2023) 6). "Mr. October" (2023) 7). "Cybertruck" (2023) 8). "Teléfono Nuevo" (2023) 9). "Baby Nueva" (2023) 10). "Seda" (2023) 11). "Un Preview" (2023) 12). "Gently" (2022) 13). "Gracias Por Nada" (2020) 14). "Vou 708" (2023) 15). "Where She Goes" (2023) 16). "Mercedes Carota" (2023) 17). "Los Pits" (2023) 19). "No Me Quiero Casar" (2023) 20). "Vuele Candy B" (2023) 23). "Baticano" (2023) 24). "Thunder y Lighting" (2023) 25). "Acho PR" (2023) 29). "Un X100to" (2023) 49). "Mojabi Ghost" (2023)	October 28, 2023	
24	Bad Bunny	List: 1). "Moscow Mule" (2022) 2). "Titi Me Preguntó" (2023) 3). "Después De La Playa" (2022) 4). "Me Porto Bonito" (2022) 5). "Party" (2022) 6). "Un Ratito" (2022) 7). "Tarot" (2022) 8). "Yo No Soy Celoso" (2022) 9). "Ojos Lindos" (2022) 11). "Neverita" (2022) 12). "La Corriente" (2022) 13). "Efecto" (2022) 15). "Aguacero" (2022) 16). "Dos Mil 16" (2022) 17). "Otro Atardecer" (2022) 18). "Andrea" (2022) 19). "El Apagón" (2022) 20). "Un Verano Sin Ti" (2022) 21). "Un Coco" (2022) 22). "Me Fui de Vacaciones" (2022) 23). "Enséñame a Bailar" (2022) 24). "Callaita" (2019) 25). "Agosto" (2022)	May 21, 2022	
20	Ozuna		September 8, 2018	
16	Bad Bunny	List: 2). "MIA" (2018) 4). "Te Bote" (2018) 6). "Solo de Mi" (2018) 8). "Ni Bien Ni Mal" (2018) 16). "La Romana" (2018) 21). "200 MPH" (2018) 24). "Caro" (2018) 27). "Otra Noche en Miami" (2018) 29). "Si Estuviéramos Juntos" (2018) 31). "Está Rico" (2018) 39). "Cuando Perreabas" (2018) 42). "Tenemos Que Hablar" (2018) 43). "Te Guste" (2018) 44). "Ser Bichote" (2018) 48). "Como Antes" (2018) 50). "RLNDT" (2018)	January 12, 2019	
13	Ozuna		October 7, 2017	

=== Most songs ===
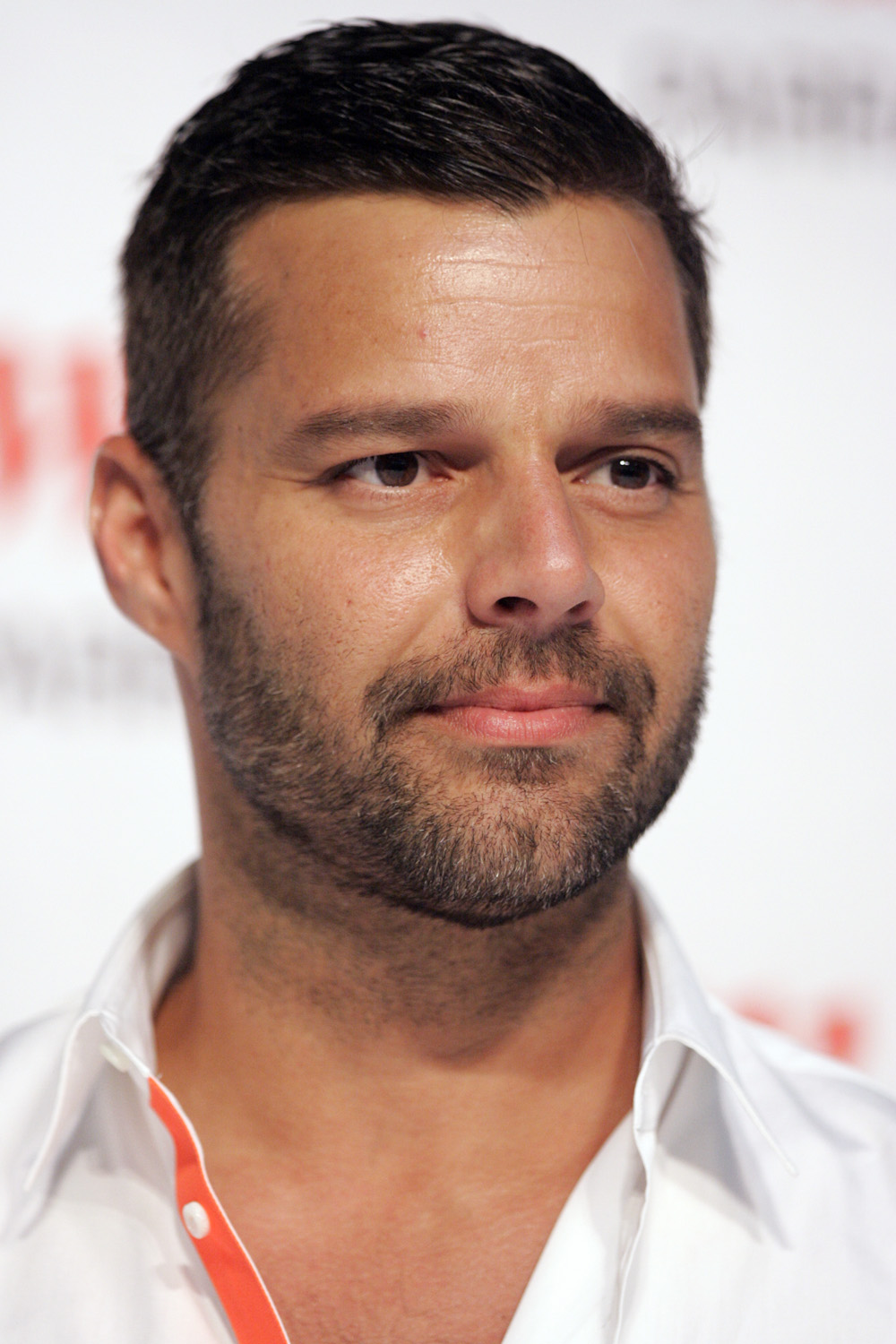
Ricky Martin is the only artist to chart in five different decades (1980s–2020s), including his work with the boy band Menudo.

The following list contains the top artists per singles on the chart:

Number of singles	Artist(s)	Longest-charting single		Span	Ref.
Number of singles	Artist(s)	Single	Weeks	Span	Ref.
191	Bad Bunny	"DTMF" (2025)	85	2017–2025	
126	Anuel AA	"Ella Quiere Beber" (2018)	46	2016–2025	
121	Ozuna	"El Farsante" (2017) "Te Boté" (2018)	52	2016–2024	
106	Daddy Yankee	"Despacito" (2017)	110	2004–2023	
102	Peso Pluma	"Qlona" (2023)	45	2023–2026	
101	Karol G	"Qlona" (2023)	45	2016–2026	
100	J Balvin	"Mi Gente" (2017)	56	2013–2022	
85	Rauw Alejandro	"Todo De Ti" (2021)	43	2019–2025	
82	Fuerza Regida	"Marlboro Rojo" (2025)	41	2018–2025	
67	Los Tigres del Norte	"La Sorpresa" (2005)	26	1987–2021	
65	Vicente Fernández	"Me Voy A Quitar De En Medio" (1999)	52	1987–2021	
64	Marc Anthony	"Vivir Mi Vida" (2013)	54	1993–2025	
61	Romeo Santos	"Propuesta Indecente" (1999)	125	2013–2025	
59	Nicky Jam	"El Perdón" (2015)	58	2005–2025	
58	Luis Miguel	"Ahora Te Puedes Marchar" (1987)	34	1987–2010	

=== Most end-year songs at number one ===
The following list contains the top artists per number of songs at number one as determined by the end-year ranking of the chart:

Number of Songs	Artist(s)	Years
4	Bad Bunny	2019, 2021, 2022, 2025
3	Ana Gabriel	1988, 1991, 1992
3	Enrique Iglesias	2010, 2014, 2015
3	Juan Gabriel	1997, 1998, 2001
2	Daddy Yankee	2017, 2018
2	Justin Bieber	2017, 2018
2	Luis Fonsi	2017, 2018
2	Nicky Jam	2015, 2016
2	Selena	1994, 1995
2	La Mafia	1993, 1996

=== Most weeks at number one per year ===
The following list contains the top artists per number of weeks at number one by year on the chart:

Number of weeks	Artist(s)	Longest-reigning single (weeks)	Year
42	Bad Bunny	"DTMF" (41)	2025
38	Enrique Iglesias	"El Perdón" (30)	2015
35	Daddy Yankee	"Despacito" (35)	2017
35	Luis Fonsi	"Despacito" (35)	2017
34	Enrique Iglesias	"Bailando" (33)	2014
29	J Balvin	"Ritmo" (24)	2020
26	Daddy Yankee	"Con Calma" (14)	2019
26	Ozuna	"Te Boté" (14)	2018
26	Peso Pluma	"Ella Baila Sola" (19)	2023
25	Bad Bunny	"Dakiti" (20)	2021
25	Alejandro Sanz	"La Tortura" (25)	2005
25	Shakira	"La Tortura" (25)	2005
22	Bad Bunny	"Me Porto Bonito" (20)	2022
22	Selena	"Amor Prohibido" (9)	1994
21	Selena	"Tú, Solo Tú" (10)	1995
21	Son By Four	"A Puro Dolor " (20)	2000
20	Flex	"Te Quiero" (20)	2008

==== Most weeks at number one by year complete list ====
The following list contain the top yearly artist and single per weeks at number one on the chart:

Year	Artist (weeks)	Song (weeks)	Ref.
1986	Juan Gabriel and José José (4)	"Yo No Sé Qué Me Pasó" by Juan Gabriel (4)	
1987	Julio Iglesias (15)	"Lo Mejor de Tu Vida" by Julio Iglesias (13)	
1988	Yuri (16)	"Qué Te Pasa" by Yuri (16)	
1989	José José and Luis Miguel (10)	"Como Tú" by José José (10)	
1990	Ana Gabriel (11)	"Tengo Todo Excepto A Ti" by Luis Miguel (8)	
1991	Ana Gabriel (16)	"Todo, Todo, Todo" by Daniela Romo and "Cosas del Amor" by Vikki Carr and Ana Gabriel (10)	
1992	Luis Miguel (12)	"Evidencias" by Ana Gabriel (10)	
1993	Ricardo Montaner (11)	"Me Estoy Enamorando" by La Mafia (9)	
1994	Selena (22)	"Amor Prohibido" by Selena (9)	
1995	Selena (21)	"Tú, Solo Tú" by Selena (10)	
1996	Enrique Iglesias (19)	"Amor" by Cristian Castro (11)	
1997	Enrique Iglesias (27)	"Enamorado Por Primera Vez" by Enrique Iglesias (12)	
1998	Alejandro Fernández (19)	"No Sé Olvidar" by Alejandro Fernández (8)	
1999	Ricky Martin and Marc Anthony (12)	"Livin' La Vida Loca" by Ricky Martin (9)	
2000	Son by Four (21)	"A Puro Dolor" by Son by Four (20)	
2001	Juan Gabriel and Cristian Castro (9)	"Abrázame Muy Fuerte" by Juan Gabriel and "Azul" by Cristian Castro (9)	
2002	Pilar Montenegro (13)	"Quítame Ese Hombre" by Pilar Montenegro (13)	
2003	Ricky Martin (12)	"Tal Vez" by Ricky Martin (11)	
2004	Juanes (12)	"Nada Valgo Sin Tu Amor" by Juanes (12)	
2005	Shakira and Alejandro Sanz (25)	"La Tortura" by Shakira featuring Alejandro Sanz (25)	
2006	Daddy Yankee (12)	"Rompe" by Daddy Yankee (12)	
2007	Juanes (14)	"Me Enamora" by Juanes (14)	
2008	Flex (20)	"Te Quiero" by Flex (20)	
2009	Luis Fonsi and Banda El Recodo (7)	"Te Presumo" by Banda El Recodo (6)	
2010	Juan Luis Guerra (18)	"Cuando Me Enamoro" by Enrique Iglesias featuring Juan Luis Guerra (17)	
2011	Romeo Santos (15)	"Danza Kuduro" by Don Omar featuring Lucenzo, "Lluvia al Corazón" by Maná, and "Promise" by Romeo Santos featuring Usher (8)	
2012	Wisin & Yandel (13)	"Algo Me Gusta De Ti" by Wisin & Yandel featuring Chris Brown and T-Pain (11)	
2013	Marc Anthony (17)	"Vivir Mi Vida" by Marc Anthony (16)	
2014	Enrique Iglesias (34)	"Bailando" by Enrique Iglesias featuring Descemer Bueno and Gente de Zona (33)	
2015	Enrique Iglesias (38)	"El Perdón" by Nicky Jam and Enrique Iglesias (30)	
2016	Nicky Jam (18)	"Hasta El Amanecer" by Nicky Jam (18)	
2017	Luis Fonsi and Daddy Yankee (35)	"Despacito" by Luis Fonsi and Daddy Yankee featuring Justin Bieber (35)	
2018	Ozuna (26)	"Despacito" by Luis Fonsi and Daddy Yankee featuring Justin Bieber (21)	
2019	Daddy Yankee (26)	"Con Calma" by Daddy Yankee and Katy Perry featuring Snow (14)	
2020	J Balvin (29)	"Ritmo" by The Black Eyed Peas and J Balvin (24)	
2021	Bad Bunny (25)	"Dakiti" by Bad Bunny and Jhay Cortez (20)	
2022	Bad Bunny (22)	"Me Porto Bonito" by Bad Bunny and Chencho (20)	
2023	Peso Pluma (26)	"Ella Baila Sola" by Eslabon Armando and Peso Pluma (19)	
2024	Floyymenor and Cris MJ, and Xavi (14)	"Gata Only" by Floyymenor and Cris MJ, and "La Diabla" by Xavi (14)	
2025	Bad Bunny (42)	"DTMF" by Bad Bunny (41)	

== Additional achievements ==
- Enrique Iglesias and Bad Bunny are the artists with the most songs that have topped the chart for at least 10 weeks each, with seven each, followed by Daddy Yankee, with five. Iglesias' songs have also spent a collective 620 weeks in the top 10.
- Ricky Martin is the only act to appear on the chart in five different decades –from the 1980s to the 2020s– including his work in Puerto Rican boy band Menudo from 1984 to 1989, which is counted separately. He charted in four decades as a solo artist, like Luis Miguel, Chayanne and Enrique Iglesias.
- With "DTMF", Dákiti, and "Me Porto Bonito", Bad Bunny is the first and only artist with more than two singles to have spent at least 20 weeks at number one.
- Bad Bunny holds the record for the most simultaneous top 10, top 20 and top 25 songs –with nine, 18 and 23 tracks, respectively– as well as the most concurrent charting songs in one week, with 24, achieved on the issued dated May 21, 2022, following the release of his album Un Verano Sin Ti. He held the record for the most simultaneous top 10, top 20 and top 25 songs –with eight, 18 and 20 tracks, respectively– achieved on the issued dated March 14, 2020, following the release of his album YHLQMDLG.
- J Balvin's "Ginza" garnered him the Guinness World Record for the longest reigning number one by a single artist, with 22 weeks from October 17, 2015 to March 12, 2016.

== See also ==
- Billboard Top Latin Songs Year-End Chart
- Billboard Hot Latin Songs
- Billboard Top Latin Albums
- Billboard Hot 100
