= Party (Bad Bunny and Rauw Alejandro song) =

Single by Bad Bunny and Rauw Alejandro

from the album Un Verano Sin Ti
- Language: Spanish
- Released: August 5, 2022
- Genre: Reggaeton; disco; sandungueo; house
- Length: 3:47
- Label: Rimas
- Songwriters: Benito Martínez; Raúl Ocasio; Elena Rose
- Producers: Tainy; La Paciencia; Jota Rosa; Albert Hype; Richi

Bad Bunny singles chronology
"Me Porto Bonito" (2022)	"Party" (2022)	"Neverita" (2022)

Rauw Alejandro singles chronology
"Lokera" (2022)	"Party" (2022)	"Punto 40" (2022)

Visualizer
- "Party (360° Visualizer)" on YouTube

"Party" is a song by Puerto Rican rapper Bad Bunny featuring Rauw Alejandro, from Bad Bunny's fifth studio album Un Verano Sin Ti (2022). It was originally released on May 6, 2022, by Kagueto's Entertainment alongside the rest of its parent album as the eleventh track before its release as the fifth official single on August 5, 2022. The song was written by Benito Martínez and Raúl Ocasio and its production was held by Tainy, La Paciencia, Jota Rosa, Albert Hype and Richi.

== Critical reception ==
Billboard ranked "Party" the fifth best collaboration song on Un Verano Sin Ti because it "works for so many reasons: an earworm chorus, the refreshing nu-disco undertones, two really fun and experimental artists working together. All elements combined make it a standout on the set. Fun fact: The loop/chorus "party party party party" is sung by singer-songwriter Elena Rose."

== Commercial performance ==
After Un Verano Sin Ti was released, "Party" debuted at number 14 on the US Billboard Hot 100 dated May 21, 2022, becoming the fifth-highest charting track from the album behind the four American top-ten songs "Moscow Mule", "Tití Me Preguntó", "Después de la Playa" and "Me Porto Bonito" which peaked at number 4, 5, 6 and 10, respectively. Additionally, it peaked at number 4 on the US Hot Latin Songs chart as well as peaking at number 8 on the Billboard Global 200.

== Audio visualizer ==
A 360° audio visualizer for the song was uploaded to YouTube on May 6, 2022, along with the other audio visualizer videos of the songs that appeared on Un Verano Sin Ti.

== Live performances ==
Bad Bunny performed this song as part of his Super Bowl halftime show.

== Charts ==
=== Weekly charts ===
Weekly chart performance for "Party"
Chart (2022–2023)	Peak position
Argentina Hot 100 (Billboard)	33
Bolivia (Billboard)	5
Chile (Billboard)	6
Colombia (Billboard)	6
Costa Rica (FONOTICA)	8
Dominican Republic (Monitor Latino)	15
Ecuador (Billboard)	4
Ecuador Urbano (Monitor Latino)	5
Global 200 (Billboard)	8
Guatemala (Monitor Latino)	12
Honduras (Monitor Latino)	7
Latin America (Monitor Latino)	15
Mexico (Billboard)	3
Mexico Streaming (AMPROFON)	6
Nicaragua (Monitor Latino)	17
Panama Urbano (Monitor Latino)	13
Peru (Monitor Latino)	3
Peru (Billboard)	3
Portugal (AFP)	151
Puerto Rico (Monitor Latino)	11
Spain (Promusicae)	7
US Billboard Hot 100	14
US Hot Latin Songs (Billboard)	4
US Latin Airplay (Billboard)	1
US Rhythmic Airplay (Billboard)	28
Venezuela Urbano (Monitor Latino)	15

=== Year-end charts ===
2022 year-end chart performance for "Party"
Chart (2022)	Position
Global 200 (Billboard)	59
Spain (PROMUSICAE)	89
US Billboard Hot 100	77
US Hot Latin Songs (Billboard)	7

== Certifications ==
Certifications for "Party"
Region	Certification	Certified units/sales
Spain (Promusicae)	2× Platinum	120,000^{‡}
^{‡} Sales+streaming figures based on certification alone.

== See also ==
- List of Billboard Hot Latin Songs and Latin Airplay number ones of 2023
