= Me Porto Bonito =

2022 single by Bad Bunny and Chencho Corleone

Single by Bad Bunny and Chencho Corleone

from the album Un Verano Sin Ti
- Language: Spanish
- Released: June 20, 2022
- Genre: Reggaeton; sandungueo
- Length: 2:58
- Label: Rimas
- Songwriters: Benito Martínez; Orlando Valle
- Producers: MAG; Súbelo NEO; La Paciencia; Lennex

Bad Bunny singles chronology
"Después de la Playa" (2022)	"Me Porto Bonito" (2022)	"Party" (2022)

Chencho Corleone singles chronology
"Nos Comemos Vivos" (2022)	"Me Porto Bonito" (2022)	"CXO (A Quién No Le Gusta)" (2022)

Music video
- "Me Porto Bonito" on YouTube

"Me Porto Bonito" (English: "I'll Behave Nicely") is a song by Puerto Rican rapper Bad Bunny and singer Chencho Corleone from the former's fifth studio album Un Verano Sin Ti (2022) featured as the fourth single, following "Callaíta", "Moscow Mule", "Tití Me Preguntó" and "Después de la Playa". The song was written by Benito Martínez and Orlando Valle but its production was handled by MAG, Súbelo NEO, La Paciencia and Lennex.

== Background and lyrics ==
During an interview with Puerto Rican personality Chente Ydrach, Bunny explained that “Me Porto Bonito” was recorded right after he attended the Met Gala in New York. He admitted to even going to the studio in his same outfit and hairdo. “When I did that song, I didn’t have anyone in mind that’s not him. If it wasn’t with him, I wasn’t going to release the song,” he expressed. The lyrics of the song features two narrators who were attracted by an attractive woman whom they convinced her to post a selfie so to demonstrate how sexy the woman is. Also, both of the men would promise to behave well to the woman if they were asked to.

== Promotion and release ==
On May 2, 2022, Bad Bunny announced his fifth studio album, Un Verano Sin Ti, on which the song appears number three on the tracklist. On May 6, 2022, "Me Porto Bonito" was released alongside the rest of Un Verano Sin Ti through Rimas Entertainment before releasing it on June 20, 2022 as the fifth single from the album upon the release of its music video on YouTube.

== Critical reception ==
According to the Billboard, "Me Porto Bonito" was ranked the second best collaboration song from Un Verano Sin Ti as it "transitions from its modern-day perreo to an old-school party de marquesina beat which attracts fans as their most favorite track thanks to its ultra-hyped lyrics about being beautiful and confident". The line "Tú no ere' bebecita, tú ere' bebesota" also trended as a sound on TikTok.

=== Awards and nominations ===
Ceremony	Year	Category	Result
American Music Awards	2022	Favorite Music Video	Nominated
American Music Awards	2022	Favorite Latin Song	Nominated
Billboard Latin Music Awards	2022	Hot Latin Song of the Year	Nominated
Billboard Latin Music Awards	2022	Hot Latin Song of the Year, vocal event	Nominated
Billboard Latin Music Awards	2022	Latyn Rhythm Song of the Year	Nominated
MTV Europe Music Awards	2022	Best Song	Nominated
MTV Europe Music Awards	2022	Best Collaboration	Nominated
MTV Video Music Awards	2022	Song of Summer	Nominated

== Commercial performance ==
Following the release of its parent album, "Me Porto Bonito" debuted at number 10 on the US Billboard Hot 100 dated May 21, 2022, becoming the fourth-highest charting track from Un Verano Sin Ti behind "Moscow Mule", "Tití Me Preguntó" and "Después de la Playa", which peaked at numbers 4, 5 and 6, respectively. Additionally, it topped the US Hot Latin Songs chart as well as peaking at number 2 on the Billboard Global 200. "Me Porto Bonito" was a commercial success as it peaked at number one in Bolivia, Chile, Colombia, Ecuador, Mexico and Peru. Later, "Me Porto Bonito" would ascend to number 6 on the Billboard Hot 100 upon the issue date of July 23, 2022.

== Audio visualizer ==
A 360° audio visualizer for the song was uploaded to YouTube on May 6, 2022, along with the other audio visualizer videos of the songs that appeared on Un Verano Sin Ti and the 360-degree video visualizer shows Bunny and two of his friends hanging out at the beach.

== Music video ==
The music video for "Me Porto Bonito" was released on YouTube on June 20, 2022 which shows Bunny washing a pickup truck for two ladies who are making plans to go out at night, while Chencho is driving around town in a white car. The two artists then come together at a pool party where they are joined by the two ladies and a group of women. In March 2025, the music video reached 1 Billion views on YouTube.

== Charts ==
=== Weekly charts ===
Weekly chart performance for "Me Porto Bonito"
Chart (2022–2026)	Peak position
Argentina Hot 100 (Billboard)	4
Bolivia (Billboard)	1
Bolivia (Monitor Latino)	4
Canada Hot 100 (Billboard)	68
Central America (Monitor Latino)	1
Chile (Billboard)	1
Colombia (Billboard)	1
Costa Rica (Monitor Latino)	14
Costa Rica (FONOTICA)	3
Dominican Republic (Monitor Latino)	13
Ecuador (Billboard)	1
Ecuador (Monitor Latino)	9
El Salvador (Monitor Latino)	2
Global 200 (Billboard)	2
Honduras (Monitor Latino)	1
Italy (FIMI)	79
Latin America (Monitor Latino)	7
Mexico (Billboard)	1
Mexico (AMPROFON)	1
Nicaragua (Monitor Latino)	2
Panama (Monitor Latino)	7
Paraguay (Monitor Latino)	8
Peru (Monitor Latino)	5
Peru (Billboard)	1
Portugal (AFP)	38
Spain (Promusicae)	2
Suriname (Nationale Top 40)	1
Switzerland (Schweizer Hitparade)	72
US Billboard Hot 100	6
US Hot Latin Songs (Billboard)	1
US Latin Rhythm Airplay (Billboard)	1

=== Year-end charts ===
2022 year-end chart performance for "Me Porto Bonito"
Chart (2022)	Position
Global 200 (Billboard)	11
Spain (PROMUSICAE)	6
US Billboard Hot 100	20
US Hot Latin Songs (Billboard)	1
US Latin Airplay Songs (Billboard)	13

2023 year-end chart performance for "Me Porto Bonito"
Chart (2023)	Position
Global 200 (Billboard)	32
US Hot Latin Songs (Billboard)	10
US Latin Airplay Songs (Billboard)	47

== Certifications ==
Certifications and sales for "Me Porto Bonito"
Region	Certification	Certified units/sales
France (SNEP)	Platinum	200,000^{‡}
Italy (FIMI)	Platinum	100,000^{‡}
Portugal (AFP)	2× Platinum	20,000^{‡}
Spain (Promusicae)	8× Platinum	480,000^{‡}
^{‡} Sales+streaming figures based on certification alone.

== See also ==
- List of Billboard Hot 100 top-ten singles in 2022
- List of Billboard Hot Latin Songs and Latin Airplay number ones of 2022
- List of best-selling singles in Spain
- List of best-selling Latin singles
