= Neverita (song) =

Single by Bad Bunny

from the album Un Verano Sin Ti
- Language: Spanish
- Released: August 22, 2022
- Genre: House; Latin trap; pop rap
- Length: 2:53
- Label: Rimas
- Songwriters: Benito Martínez; Tainy; La Paciencia; Cheo Legendary; Kamil Jacob Assad
- Producers: Tainy; La Paciencia; Cheo Legendary

Bad Bunny singles chronology
"Party" (2022)	"Neverita" (2022)	"El Apagón" (2022)

Music video
- "Neverita" on YouTube

"Neverita" (English: "Little Cooler") is a song by Puerto Rican rapper Bad Bunny from his fifth studio album Un Verano Sin Ti (2022), which it appeared as the eighth track. The song was released on August 22, 2022, along with its music video as the sixth single from Un Verano Sin Ti. It is written by Benito Martínez and its production was handled by Tainy, Pelangaboy and Cheo Legendary.

On September 29, 2022, Puerto Rican singer Elvis Crespo released a merengue version of the song. Crespo performed the song at the 2022 Latin Billboard Music Awards.

== Promotion and release ==
On May 2, 2022, Bad Bunny announced his fifth studio album, Un Verano Sin Ti, on which "Neverita" is placed at number eighth on the track list. On May 6, 2022, the song was released alongside the rest of Un Verano Sin Ti through Rimas Entertainment.

== Chart performance ==
"Neverita" charted on the Billboard Hot 100 and on the Billboard Global 200 at numbers 31 and 16, respectively.

== Audio visualizer ==
A 360° audio visualizer for "Neverita" was released on May 6, 2022, through YouTube along with the other audio visualizer videos of the songs that appeared on Un Verano Sin Ti.

== Music video ==
The music video for "Neverita" was released on August 23, 2022, which pays a tribute to "Suavemente" by Elvis Crespo that was released in 1998 accompanied with its green-screen images and bright colors. At the end of the music video, a message is revealed - "In honor of the best video of all time". (Note: Translated from the Spanish message, "En honor al mejor video de todos los tiempos")

== Charts ==
=== Weekly charts ===
Weekly chart performance for "Neverita"
Chart (2022–2023)	Peak position
Argentina Hot 100 (Billboard)	48
Bolivia (Billboard)	7
Bolivia (Monitor Latino)	5
Central America (Monitor Latino)	1
Chile (Billboard)	16
Colombia (Billboard)	15
Costa Rica (Monitor Latino)	16
Costa Rica (FONOTICA)	12
Ecuador (Billboard)	6
Global 200 (Billboard)	16
Guatemala (Monitor Latino)	16
Honduras (Monitor Latino)	13
Latin America (Monitor Latino)	13
Mexico (Billboard)	6
Nicaragua (Monitor Latino)	4
Panama (Monitor Latino)	14
Paraguay (Monitor Latino)	7
Peru (Monitor Latino)	6
Peru (Billboard)	7
Spain (Promusicae)	11
US Billboard Hot 100	31
US Hot Latin Songs (Billboard)	10

Chart (2026)	Peak position
Portugal (AFP)	66

=== Year-end charts ===
2022 year-end chart performance for "Neverita"
Chart (2022)	Position
Global 200 (Billboard)	96
Spain (PROMUSICAE)	69
US Hot Latin Songs (Billboard)	14

== Certifications ==
Certifications and sales for "Neverita"
Region	Certification	Certified units/sales
Portugal (AFP)	Gold	12,000^{‡}
Spain (Promusicae)	3× Platinum	180,000^{‡}
^{‡} Sales+streaming figures based on certification alone.
