= Un Ratito =

Song by Bad Bunny

from the album Un Verano Sin Ti
- Language: Spanish
- Released: May 6, 2022
- Genre: Reggaeton; cumbia; indie pop
- Length: 2:56
- Label: Rimas
- Songwriter: Benito Martínez
- Producers: Tainy; La Paciencia; De La Cruz

Visualizer
- "Bad Bunny - Un Ratito (360° Visualizer)" on YouTube

"Un Ratito" (English: "A Little While") is a song by Puerto Rican rapper Bad Bunny from his fifth studio album Un Verano Sin Ti (2022). The song was written by Benito Martínez and its production was handled by Tainy, La Paciencia and De La Cruz.

== Promotion and release ==
On May 2, 2022, bad Bunny announced his fifth studio album, Un Verano Sin Ti, on which is fifth on the tracklist. On May 6, 2022, "Un Ratito" was released alongside the rest of the album through Rimas Entertainment.

== Commercial performance ==
"Un Ratito" was one of the twenty-two tracks from Un Verano Sin Ti album that charted on the Billboard Hot 100, peaking at number 16. It also performed well on the Billboard Global 200 along with the other twenty-two album tracks, charting at number 11. On the US Hot Latin Songs chart, the track peaked at number 6.

== Audio visualizer ==
A 360° audio visualizer for the song was uploaded to YouTube on May 6, 2022, along with the other audio visualizer videos of the songs that appeared on Un Verano Sin Ti.

== Charts ==
=== Weekly charts ===
Weekly chart performance for "Un Ratito"
Chart (2022)	Peak position
Argentina Hot 100 (Billboard)	49
Bolivia (Billboard)	10
Chile (Billboard)	9
Colombia (Billboard)	8
Costa Rica (FONOTICA)	7
Ecuador (Billboard)	9
Global 200 (Billboard)	11
Mexico (Billboard)	9
Peru (Billboard)	10
Spain (PROMUSICAE)	9
US Billboard Hot 100	16
US Hot Latin Songs (Billboard)	6

=== Year-end charts ===
2022 year-end chart performance for "Un Ratito"
Chart (2022)	Position
Global 200 (Billboard)	137
US Hot Latin Songs (Billboard)	12

== Certifications ==
Certifications and sales for "Un Ratito"
Region	Certification	Certified units/sales
Spain (PROMUSICAE)	2× Platinum	200,000^{‡}
^{‡} Sales+streaming figures based on certification alone.
