= List of Billboard Latin Rhythm Albums number ones of 2023 =

The Latin Rhythm Albums chart is a music chart published in Billboard magazine. The data is compiled by Nielsen SoundScan from a sample that includes music stores, music departments at electronics and department stores, internet sales (both physical and digital) and verifiable sales from concert venues in the United States. The chart is composed of studio, live, and compilation releases by Latin artists performing in the Latin hip hop, urban, dance and reggaeton, the most popular Latin Rhythm music genres.

== Albums ==
Chart date	Album	Artist(s)	Reference
January 7	Un Verano Sin Ti	Bad Bunny	
January 14	Un Verano Sin Ti	Bad Bunny	
January 21	Un Verano Sin Ti	Bad Bunny	
January 28	Un Verano Sin Ti	Bad Bunny	
February 4	Un Verano Sin Ti	Bad Bunny	
February 11	Un Verano Sin Ti	Bad Bunny	
February 18	Un Verano Sin Ti	Bad Bunny	
February 25	Un Verano Sin Ti	Bad Bunny	
March 4	Un Verano Sin Ti	Bad Bunny	
March 11	Mañana Será Bonito	Karol G	
March 18	Mañana Será Bonito	Karol G	
March 25	Mañana Será Bonito	Karol G	
April 1	Mañana Será Bonito	Karol G	
April 8	Mañana Será Bonito	Karol G	
April 15	Un Verano Sin Ti	Bad Bunny	
April 22	Un Verano Sin Ti	Bad Bunny	
April 29	Un Verano Sin Ti	Bad Bunny	
May 6	Un Verano Sin Ti	Bad Bunny	
May 13	Un Verano Sin Ti	Bad Bunny	
May 20	Un Verano Sin Ti	Bad Bunny	
May 27	Un Verano Sin Ti	Bad Bunny	
June 3	Un Verano Sin Ti	Bad Bunny	
June 10	Un Verano Sin Ti	Bad Bunny	
June 17	Un Verano Sin Ti	Bad Bunny	
June 24	Un Verano Sin Ti	Bad Bunny	
July 1	Un Verano Sin Ti	Bad Bunny	
July 8	Un Verano Sin Ti	Bad Bunny	
July 15	Data	Tainy	
July 22	Un Verano Sin Ti	Bad Bunny	
July 29	Un Verano Sin Ti	Bad Bunny	
August 5	Un Verano Sin Ti	Bad Bunny	
August 12	Un Verano Sin Ti	Bad Bunny	
August 19	Un Verano Sin Ti	Bad Bunny	
August 26	Mañana Será Bonito (Bichota Season)	Karol G	
September 2	Mañana Será Bonito (Bichota Season)	Karol G	
September 9	Mañana Será Bonito (Bichota Season)	Karol G	
September 16	Mañana Será Bonito (Bichota Season)	Karol G	
September 23	Mañana Será Bonito (Bichota Season)	Karol G	
September 30	Mañana Será Bonito (Bichota Season)	Karol G	
October 7	Mañana Será Bonito (Bichota Season)	Karol G	
October 14	Un Verano Sin Ti	Bad Bunny	
October 21	Un Verano Sin Ti	Bad Bunny	
October 28	Nadie Sabe Lo Que Va a Pasar Mañana	Bad Bunny	
November 4	Nadie Sabe Lo Que Va a Pasar Mañana	Bad Bunny	
November 11	Nadie Sabe Lo Que Va a Pasar Mañana	Bad Bunny	
November 18	Nadie Sabe Lo Que Va a Pasar Mañana	Bad Bunny	
November 25	Nadie Sabe Lo Que Va a Pasar Mañana	Bad Bunny	
December 2	Nadie Sabe Lo Que Va a Pasar Mañana	Bad Bunny	
December 9	Nadie Sabe Lo Que Va a Pasar Mañana	Bad Bunny	
December 16	Nadie Sabe Lo Que Va a Pasar Mañana	Bad Bunny	
December 23	Nadie Sabe Lo Que Va a Pasar Mañana	Bad Bunny	
December 30	Nadie Sabe Lo Que Va a Pasar Mañana	Bad Bunny	
