= Después de la Playa =

2022 single by Bad Bunny

Single by Bad Bunny

from the album Un Verano Sin Ti
- Language: Spanish
- Released: June 15, 2022
- Genre: Merengue; Mambo
- Length: 3:50
- Label: Rimas
- Songwriter: Benito Martínez
- Producers: MAG; La Paciencia; Elikai; Dahian el Apechao

Bad Bunny singles chronology
"Tití Me Preguntó" (2022)	"Después de la Playa" (2022)	"Me Porto Bonito" (2022)

Visualizer
- "Después de la Playa (360° Visualizer)" on YouTube

"Después de la Playa" (English: "After the Beach") is a song by Puerto Rican rapper Bad Bunny that appears as the second track on his fifth studio album Un Verano Sin Ti (2022), which was released on May 6, 2022, by Rimas Entertainment. The song was written by Benito Martínez and its production was handled by MAG, La Paciencia, Elikai and Dahian el Apechao. On June 15, 2022, the song was sent to radio as the third official single off the album.

== Commercial performance ==
Following the release of Un Verano Sin Ti, "Después de la Playa" charted at number 6 on the US Billboard Hot 100 dated May 21, 2022, becoming the third-highest charting track from the album behind "Moscow Mule" and "Tití Me Preguntó", which peaked at number 4 and 5, respectively; it was one of four American top-ten hits from the album. The song also charted at numbers 3 and 7 on the US Hot Latin Songs and Billboard Global 200, respectively.

== Audio visualizer ==
A 360° audio visualizer for the song was uploaded to YouTube on May 6, 2022, along with the other audio visualizer videos of the songs that appeared on Un Verano Sin Ti.

== Charts ==
=== Weekly charts ===
Weekly chart performance for "Después de la Playa"
Chart (2022)	Peak position
Argentina Hot 100 (Billboard)	57
Bolivia (Billboard)	6
Chile (Billboard)	11
Colombia (Billboard)	6
Costa Rica (FONOTICA)	6
Ecuador (Billboard)	5
Global 200 (Billboard)	7
Mexico (Billboard)	6
Peru (Billboard)	6
Portugal (AFP)	160
Spain (PROMUSICAE)	5
Switzerland (Schweizer Hitparade)	91
US Billboard Hot 100	6
US Hot Latin Songs (Billboard)	3
US Tropical Airplay (Billboard)	15

=== Year-end charts ===
2022 year-end chart performance for "Después de la Playa"
Chart (2022)	Position
Bolivia Airplay (Monitor Latino)	43
Global 200 (Billboard)	107
Spain (PROMUSICAE)	63
US Billboard Hot 100	78
US Hot Latin Songs (Billboard)	8

== Certifications ==
Certifications for "Después de la Playa"
Region	Certification	Certified units/sales
Spain (PROMUSICAE)	2× Platinum	120,000^{‡}
^{‡} Sales+streaming figures based on certification alone.

== See also ==
- List of Billboard Hot 100 top-ten singles in 2022
