= Me Fui de Vacaciones =

Song by Bad Bunny

from the album Un Verano Sin Ti
- Language: Spanish
- Released: May 6, 2022
- Genre: Reggae
- Length: 3:00
- Label: Rimas
- Songwriter: Benito Martínez
- Producers: Tainy; La Paciencia; Richi

Visualizer
- "Bad Bunny - Me Fui de Vacaciones (360° Visualizer)" on YouTube

"Me Fui de Vacaciones" (English: "I Went on Vacation") is a song by Puerto Rican rapper Bad Bunny from his fifth studio album Un Verano Sin Ti (2022). The song was written by Benito Martínez and its production was handled by Tainy, La Paciencia and Richi.

Some time before the launch of the record, Bad Bunny filtered the chorus of the song, as a teaser of Un Verano Sin Ti. The teaser became a TikTok trend on the Spanish-speaking countries.

== Promotion and release ==
On May 2, 2022, Bad Bunny announced his fifth studio album, Un Verano Sin Ti, on which the song appears number twentieth on the tracklist. On May 6, 2022, "Me Fui de Vacaciones" was released alongside the rest of Un Verano Sin Ti through Rimas Entertainment.

== Commercial performance ==
Along with the rest of Un Verano Sin Ti, "Me Fui de Vacaciones" charted on the Billboard Hot 100, peaking at number 59. It also performed well on the Billboard Global 200 along with the rest of the aforementioned album, charting at number 18. On the US Hot Latin Songs chart, the track peaked at number 21.

== Audio Visualizer ==
A 360° audio visualizer for the song was uploaded to YouTube on May 6, 2022, along with the other audio visualizer videos of the songs that appeared on Un Verano Sin Ti.

== Charts ==
=== Weekly charts ===
Chart performance for "Me Fui de Vacaciones"
Chart (2022)	Peak position
Argentina Hot 100 (Billboard)	59
Bolivia (Billboard)	5
Chile (Billboard)	15
Costa Rica (FONOTICA)	10
Colombia (Billboard)	10
Ecuador (Billboard)	8
Global 200 (Billboard)	18
Mexico (Billboard)	10
Peru (Billboard)	7
Spain (PROMUSICAE)	8
US Billboard Hot 100	59
US Hot Latin Songs (Billboard)	21

=== Year-end charts ===
2022 year-end chart performance for "Me Fui de Vacaciones"
Chart (2022)	Position
US Hot Latin Songs (Billboard)	38

== Certifications ==
Certifications for "Me Fui de Vacaciones"
Region	Certification	Certified units/sales
Spain (PROMUSICAE)	2× Platinum	120,000^{‡}
^{‡} Sales+streaming figures based on certification alone.
