= List of Billboard Hot Latin Songs and Latin Airplay number ones of 2022 =

The Billboard Hot Latin Songs and Latin Airplay are charts that rank the best-performing Latin songs in the United States and are both published weekly by Billboard magazine. The Hot Latin Songs chart ranks the best-performing Spanish-language songs in the country based on digital downloads, streaming, and airplay from all radio stations. The Latin Airplay chart ranks the most-played songs on Spanish-language radio stations in the United States regardless of genre or language.

== Chart history ==
Chart history
Issue date	Hot Latin Songs			Latin Airplay		
Issue date	Title	Artist(s)	Ref.	Title	Artist(s)	Ref.
January 1	"Pepas"	Farruko		"Una Nota"	J Balvin and Sech	
January 8	"Pepas"	Farruko		"Emojis de Corazones"	Wisin, Jhay Cortez, and Ozuna featuring Los Legendarios	
January 15	"Pepas"	Farruko		"Se Menea"	Don Omar and Nio García	
January 22	"Pepas"	Farruko		"Se Menea"	Don Omar and Nio García	
January 29	"Pepas"	Farruko		"El Incomprendido"	Farruko, Víctor Cárdenas and DJ Adoni	
February 5	"Pepas"	Farruko		"Ley Seca"	Jhay Cortez and Anuel AA	
February 12	"Pepas"	Farruko		"Sejodioto"	Karol G	
February 19	"Pepas"	Farruko		"Tacones Rojos"	Sebastián Yatra	
February 26	"Mamiii"	Becky G and Karol G		"Sus Huellas"	Romeo Santos	
March 5	"Mamiii"	Becky G and Karol G		"Cúrame"	Rauw Alejandro	
March 12	"Mamiii"	Becky G and Karol G		"Mala"	Marc Anthony	
March 19	"Mamiii"	Becky G and Karol G		"Recordar"	Wisin & Yandel	
March 26	"Mamiii"	Becky G and Karol G		"Mamiii"	Becky G and Karol G	
April 2	"Mamiii"	Becky G and Karol G		"SG"	DJ Snake, Ozuna, Lisa & Megan Thee Stallion	
April 9	"Soy el Único"	Yahritza y Su Esencia		"Forever My Love"	J Balvin and Ed Sheeran	
April 16	"Mamiii"	Becky G and Karol G		"Sigue"	J Balvin and Ed Sheeran	
April 23	"Mamiii"	Becky G and Karol G		"Ojos Rojos"	Nicky Jam	
April 30	"Mamiii"	Becky G and Karol G		"Sus Huellas"	Romeo Santos	
May 7	"Mamiii"	Becky G and Karol G		"Te Felicito"	Shakira and Rauw Alejandro	
May 14	"Provenza"	Karol G		"La Fama"	Rosalía featuring The Weeknd	
May 21	"Moscow Mule"	Bad Bunny		"Medallo"	Blessd, Justin Quiles and Lenny Tavárez	
May 28	"Me Porto Bonito"	Bad Bunny and Chencho Corleone		"Mamiii"	Becky G and Karol G	
June 4	"Me Porto Bonito"	Bad Bunny and Chencho Corleone		"Deprimida"	Ozuna	
June 11	"Me Porto Bonito"	Bad Bunny and Chencho Corleone		"Mamiii"	Becky G and Karol G	
June 18	"Me Porto Bonito"	Bad Bunny and Chencho Corleone		"Mamiii"	Becky G and Karol G	
June 25	"Me Porto Bonito"	Bad Bunny and Chencho Corleone		"Te Espero"	Prince Royce and María Becerra	
July 2	"Me Porto Bonito"	Bad Bunny and Chencho Corleone		"Desesperados"	Rauw Alejandro and Chencho Corleone	
July 9	"Me Porto Bonito"	Bad Bunny and Chencho Corleone		"Provenza"	Karol G	
July 16	"Me Porto Bonito"	Bad Bunny and Chencho Corleone		"Soy Yo"	Don Omar, Wisin and Gente de Zona	
July 23	"Me Porto Bonito"	Bad Bunny and Chencho Corleone		"Buenos Días"	Wisin and Camilo	
July 30	"Me Porto Bonito"	Bad Bunny and Chencho Corleone		"Moscow Mule"	Bad Bunny	
August 6	"Me Porto Bonito"	Bad Bunny and Chencho Corleone		"Remix"	Daddy Yankee	
August 13	"Me Porto Bonito"	Bad Bunny and Chencho Corleone		"Sensual Bebe"	Jhay Cortez	
August 20	"Me Porto Bonito"	Bad Bunny and Chencho Corleone		"Me Porto Bonito"	Bad Bunny and Chencho Corleone	
August 27	"Me Porto Bonito"	Bad Bunny and Chencho Corleone		"A Veces Bien Y A Veces Mal"	Ricky Martin and Reik	
September 3	"Me Porto Bonito"	Bad Bunny and Chencho Corleone		"Mayor Que Usted"	Natti Natasha, Daddy Yankee and Wisin & Yandel	
September 10	"Me Porto Bonito"	Bad Bunny and Chencho Corleone		"Bailé Con Mi Ex"	Becky G	
September 17	"Me Porto Bonito"	Bad Bunny and Chencho Corleone		"Sin Fin"	Romeo Santos and Justin Timberlake	
September 24	"Me Porto Bonito"	Bad Bunny and Chencho Corleone		"Tití Me Preguntó"	Bad Bunny	
October 1	"Me Porto Bonito"	Bad Bunny and Chencho Corleone		"Llorar y Llorar"	Mau y Ricky and Carin León	
October 8	"Me Porto Bonito"	Bad Bunny and Chencho Corleone		"Despechá"	Rosalía	
October 15	"Tití Me Preguntó"	Bad Bunny		"Junio"	Maluma	
October 22	"Tití Me Preguntó"	Bad Bunny		"Somos Iguales"	Ozuna and Tokischa featuring Louchie Lou & Michie One	
October 29	"Tití Me Preguntó"	Bad Bunny		"La Bachata"	Manuel Turizo	
November 5	"Tití Me Preguntó"	Bad Bunny		"Quevedo: Bzrp Music Sessions, Vol. 52"	Bizarrap and Quevedo	
November 12	"Tití Me Preguntó"	Bad Bunny		"Quevedo: Bzrp Music Sessions, Vol. 52"	Bizarrap and Quevedo	
November 19	"Tití Me Preguntó"	Bad Bunny		"Quevedo: Bzrp Music Sessions, Vol. 52"	Bizarrap and Quevedo	
November 26	"Tití Me Preguntó"	Bad Bunny		"Quevedo: Bzrp Music Sessions, Vol. 52"	Bizarrap and Quevedo	
December 3	"Tití Me Preguntó"	Bad Bunny		"Monotonía"	Shakira and Ozuna	
December 10	"Tití Me Preguntó"	Bad Bunny		"Monotonía"	Shakira and Ozuna	
December 17	"Tití Me Preguntó"	Bad Bunny		"Arhbo (Music from the FIFA World Cup Quatar 2022)"	Ozuna and Gims	
December 24	"Tití Me Preguntó"	Bad Bunny		"Arhbo (Music from the FIFA World Cup Quatar 2022)"	Ozuna and Gims	
December 31	"Tití Me Preguntó"	Bad Bunny		"Arhbo (Music from the FIFA World Cup Quatar 2022)"	Ozuna and Gims	

== Hot Latin Songs weeks at number one ==
=== Songs ===
Number of weeks	Song	Artist(s)
20	"Me Porto Bonito"	Bad Bunny and Chencho Corleone
12	"Tití Me Preguntó"	Bad Bunny
10	"Mamiii"	Becky G and Karol G
8	"Pepas"	Farruko
1	"Soy el Único"	Yahritza y Su Esencia
1	"Provenza"	Karol G
1	"Moscow Mule"	Bad Bunny

=== Artists ===
Number of weeks	Artist	Number of songs
33	Bad Bunny	3
20	Chencho Corleone	1
11	Karol G	2
10	Becky G	1
8	Farruko	1
1	Yahritza y Su Esencia	1

== See also ==
- 2022 in Latin music
- List of artists who reached number one on the U.S. Latin Songs chart
- List of number-one Billboard Latin Albums from the 2020s
