= Efecto =

Song by Bad Bunny

from the album Un Verano Sin Ti
- Language: Spanish
- Released: May 6, 2022
- Genre: Reggaeton; cumbia; indie pop
- Length: 3:33
- Label: Rimas
- Songwriter: Benito Martínez
- Producers: MAG; La Paciencia; Bass Charity

Visualizer
- "Bad Bunny - Efecto (360° Visualizer)" on YouTube

"Efecto" (English: "Effect") is a song by Puerto Rican rapper Bad Bunny from his fifth studio album Un Verano Sin Ti (2022). The song was written by Benito Martínez and its production was handled by MAG, La Paciencia and Bass Charity.

== Promotion and release ==
On May 2, 2022, Bad Bunny announced his fifth studio album, Un Verano Sin Ti, on which "Efecto" is placed at number ten on the track list. On May 6, 2022, the song was released alongside the rest of Un Verano Sin Ti through Rimas Entertainment.

== Commercial performance ==
Along with the rest of the tracks from Un Verano Sin Ti, "Efecto" charted on the Billboard Hot 100, peaking at number 34. It also performed well on the Billboard Global 200 along with the other album tracks, charting at number 7. On the US Hot Latin Songs chart, the track peaked at number 4.

== Audio visualizer ==
A 360° audio visualizer for the song was uploaded to YouTube on May 6, 2022 along with the other audio visualizer videos of the songs that appeared on Un Verano Sin Ti.

== Charts ==
=== Weekly charts ===
Weekly chart performance for "Efecto"
Chart (2022–2023)	Peak position
Argentina Hot 100 (Billboard)	15
Bolivia (Billboard)	3
Chile (Billboard)	3
Colombia (Billboard)	4
Costa Rica (FONOTICA)	5
Ecuador (Billboard)	3
Global 200 (Billboard)	7
Latin America (Monitor Latino)	12
Mexico (Billboard)	3
Mexico Streaming (AMPROFON)	4
Peru (Billboard)	2
Spain (Promusicae)	11
US Billboard Hot 100	34
US Hot Latin Songs (Billboard)	4
US Latin Rhythm Airplay (Billboard)	13

Chart (2026)	Peak position
Portugal (AFP)	116

=== Year-end charts ===
2022 year-end chart performance for "Efecto"
Chart (2022)	Position
Global 200 (Billboard)	28
Spain (PROMUSICAE)	39
US Billboard Hot 100	69
US Hot Latin Songs (Billboard)	6

2023 year-end chart performance for "Efecto"
Chart (2023)	Position
Global 200 (Billboard)	134
US Hot Latin Songs (Billboard)	64

== Certifications ==
Certifications and sales for "Efecto"
Region	Certification	Certified units/sales
Italy (FIMI)	Gold	50,000^{‡}
Portugal (AFP)	Gold	12,000^{‡}
Spain (Promusicae)	4× Platinum	400,000^{‡}
^{‡} Sales+streaming figures based on certification alone.
