= Un Verano Sin Ti =

2022 studio album by Bad Bunny

Studio album by Bad Bunny
- Released: May 6, 2022
- Recorded: 2019–2022
- Studio: Electric Lady Studios (New York City) (Note: The album was partly recorded at Electric Lady in New York, and partly recorded in unknown studios in Río Grande, Puerto Rico; Fajardo, Puerto Rico; and in the Dominican Republic.)
- Genres: Reggaeton; cumbia; indie pop; psychedelia
- Length: 81:53
- Languages: Spanish; English
- Label: Rimas
- Producers: Bad Bunny; Albert Hype; Byrd; Bass Charity; C-Gutta; Cheo Legendary; Dahian el Apechao; De la Cruz; Demy & Clipz; Hassi; Haze; Hide Miyabi; Josh Conway; Jota Rosa; La Paciencia; Lennex; Luis del Valle; Mag; Magicenelbeat; Mick Coogan; Mvsis; Raquel Berríos; Richie; Scotty Dittrich; Súbelo NEO; Tainy; Zulia

Bad Bunny chronology
El Último Tour Del Mundo (2020)	Un Verano Sin Ti (2022)	Nadie Sabe Lo Que Va a Pasar Mañana (2023)

Singles from Un Verano Sin Ti
- 1. "Moscow Mule" Released: May 6, 2022; 2. "Tití Me Preguntó" Released: June 1, 2022; 3. "Después de la Playa" Released: June 15, 2022; 4. "Me Porto Bonito" Released: June 20, 2022; 5. "Party" Released: August 5, 2022; 6. "Neverita" Released: August 22, 2022; 7. "El Apagón" Released: September 16, 2022; 8. "Ojitos Lindos" Released: February 14, 2023

Un Verano Sin Ti (Spanish pronunciation: [um beˈɾano sin ˈti]; transl. A Summer Without You) is the fourth solo studio album, and fifth overall, by Puerto Rican rapper and singer Bad Bunny. It was released on May 6, 2022, by Rimas Entertainment, following nearly two years after the release of his previous record El Último Tour Del Mundo (2020). Comprising twenty-three tracks, the album is primarily a reggaeton, cumbia, indie pop and psychedelia record, and features guest appearances from Chencho Corleone, Jhayco, Tony Dize, Rauw Alejandro, Bomba Estéreo, the Marías, Buscabulla, and frequent collaborator Tainy.

A critical and commercial success, Un Verano Sin Ti debuted atop the US Billboard 200, marking Bad Bunny's second number-one album and the second all-Spanish language album to top the chart. It spent 13 weeks atop the chart and topped the Billboard 200 Year-End Chart as the best-performing album of the year, the first Spanish language album to do so. It was also the first album by a Latin artist to reach 10 billion streams on Spotify. At the 23rd Annual Latin Grammy Awards, Un Verano Sin Ti won Best Urban Music Album, while at the 65th Annual Grammy Awards, it became the first Spanish-language album to earn a Grammy nomination for Album of the Year. Un Verano Sin Ti was the world's best-performing album of 2022 according to IFPI, making Bad Bunny the first Latino to have won a IFPI Global Chart Award. Apple Music placed the album at number 76 on their 100 Best Albums list. To promote the album, Bad Bunny embarked on the all-stadium World's Hottest Tour through the second half of 2022, making it the highest-grossing tour by a Latin artist at the time.

== Background ==
Bad Bunny first teased Un Verano Sin Ti on January 24, 2022, when he posted a teaser announcing his upcoming 2022 stadium tour World's Hottest Tour: "now yes, 2022 has started". A few months later, on April 21, 2022, he posted a classified advertisement for his Bugatti Chiron with a phone number attached. When called, it would play a snippet of "Un Ratito", and send the following text message:

Hello! :) Thank you for calling. There’s little time left until the album comes out. I can’t say the date yet. But I can tell you the name: Un Verano Sin Ti ❤️🌊

He called the album "a record to play in the summer, on the beach, as a playlist".

== Composition ==
Un Verano Sin Ti is primarily a reggaeton, cumbia, indie pop and psychedelia record, driven by musical styles hailing from the Caribbean, such as reggae, bomba, calypso, soca, dembow, merengue, and bachata. The album also contains elements of a cappella, acoustic, afrobeats, alternative rock, ambient, ballad, bossa nova, chillwave, dancehall, dance-pop, disco, electronic, hip-hop, house, jazz, lambada, lo-fi, pop, R&B, rock, rocksteady, samba, sandungueo, ska, soul, surf, synth-pop, synthwave, techno, and trap.

== Artwork ==
The artwork for Un Verano Sin Ti features a sad one-eyed heart in front of a vibrant beach setting with the light blue ocean, beaming sunset, breezy palm trees, happy dolphins, and pink flowers that was designed by the Los Angeles-based artist and graphic designer Adrian Hernandez, professionally known as Ugly Primo, with whom Bad Bunny has been in friendship since 2018. Although designed by Hernandez himself, Bad Bunny claims that the idea of the album cover was all his. Ideas for the album cover were conceived as early as the summer of 2021 when Bad Bunny had reached out to Hernandez with the idea of the cover and how he wanted it to look like. Hernandez explains even further that he made about seven versions, in different styles and aesthetics, based on a drawing that Bad Bunny gave him, and a little after six months, the cover art of Un Verano Sin Ti was finally finished and unveiled to the public on May 4, 2022, just two days before the official release of the album.

== Critical reception ==
Professional ratings
Aggregate scores
Source	Rating
Metacritic	85/100
Review scores
Source	Rating
AllMusic	5/5 stars
The Guardian	4/5 stars
NME	4/5 stars
Pitchfork	8.4/10
Rolling Stone	3.5/5 stars
Slant Magazine	3.5/5 stars

Un Verano Sin Ti was met with critical acclaim. At Metacritic, which assigns a normalized rating out of 100 to reviews from professional publications, the album received an average score of 85, based on seven reviews, indicating "universal acclaim".

David Crone of AllMusic writes, "Un Verano is not only a seasonal statement-piece but a testament to Benito's singular songwriting -- across genres, generations, and even languages, he works to produce enduring landmarks that trace universal joys, sorrows, and passions." Lucas Villa of Consequence praised the album's musical versatility, highlighting that "Side B is the more adventurous half of the album, pushing Bad Bunny's sound into new places with collaborations with alternative acts. ... With the sun-kissed Un Verano Sin Ti, Bad Bunny continues to proudly give pop music some much-needed flavor, swagger, and sounds by way of the Caribbean." Honored with its "Best New Music" tag, Jennifer Mota of Pitchfork echoes Villa's remarks, writing that the album is a "cohesively packaged voyage through the various sounds synonymous with the Caribbean region—reggaetón, reggae, bomba, Dominican dembow, Dominican mambo, and bachata, among others.

Julyssa Lopez of Rolling Stone praised the album, but noted that it "does fall into some of the problems of modern reggaeton. Many have pointed out that though Bad Bunny draws inspiration from the Dominican Republic in particular, no Dominicans appear in the actual features. And the length of the album produces some lulls and selections that are pretty mid: Unsurprisingly, the most mainstream reggaeton songs on here land among the least interesting."

=== Year-end lists ===
Year-end list appearances for Un Verano Sin Ti
Publication	List	Rank	Ref.
The Alternative	Top 50 Albums of 2022	36	
Complex	50 Best Albums of 2022	2	
Los Angeles Times	The 20 Best Albums of 2022	3	
Pitchfork	The 50 Best Albums of 2022	5	
Rolling Stone	The 100 Best Albums of 2022	2	
Time	The 10 Best Albums of 2022	1	

== Awards and nominations ==
Un Verano Sin Ti is the first Spanish-language album nominated for the Grammy Award for Album of the Year.

Award	Year	Category	Result	Ref.
American Music Awards	2022	Favorite Latin Album	Won	
American Music Awards	2022	Favorite Pop Album	Nominated	
Billboard Latin Music Awards	2022	Top Latin Album of the Year	Won	
Billboard Latin Music Awards	2022	Latin Rhythm Album of the Year	Won	
Billboard Music Awards	2023	Top Latin Album	Won	
Grammy Awards	2023	Best Música Urbana Album	Won	
Grammy Awards	2023	Album of the Year	Nominated	
Latin Grammy Awards	2022	Best Urban Music Album	Won	
Latin Grammy Awards	2022	Album of the Year	Nominated	
MTV Video Music Awards	2022	Album of the Year	Nominated	
People's Choice Awards	2022	The Album of 2022	Nominated	
Rolling Stone en Español Awards	2023	Album of the Year	Nominated	

== Commercial performance ==
Un Verano Sin Ti debuted at number one on the US Billboard 200 with 274,000 album-equivalent units. It is Bad Bunny's second number-one album and the second all-Spanish language album to top the Billboard 200. The album also achieved the biggest streaming week for a Latin album ever, accumulating 356.66 million official streams in the United States, the most for any album since Drake's Certified Lover Boy (2021), and was the most-streamed album on Spotify in 2022 by that point. It spent 13 nonconsecutive weeks atop the chart, becoming the album with the most weeks at No. 1 in 2022 and the ninth album overall to spend more than 10 weeks on top of the chart since 2000.

Un Verano Sin Ti is also the first album to spend its first six months on the chart in the top two, since the Billboard 200 began publishing in 1956. It topped the 2022 Billboard 200 Year-End Chart, the first all-Spanish album to do so. In addition, it also placed at No. 1 on the year-end Independent Albums, Top Latin Albums and Latin Rhythm Albums charts.

Luminate reported 3.398 million album equivalent-units by 2022, including 70,000 physical sales (CDs) and digital download. Un Verano Sin Ti ranked 7th at 2023 Year end chart of Billboard 200 and sold over 1.47 million of units that year.

The album reached number one on the Spanish Albums Chart and has received a five-times platinum certification for having moved 200,000 units in the country. Un Verano Sin Ti became Bad Bunny's first album to reach the top 10 on the music charts of Canada, Italy, the Netherlands, and Switzerland.

== Track listing ==
Credits adapted from Apple Music, Tidal and the ASCAP and BMI Repertoire.

Un Verano Sin Ti track listing
No.	Title	Writer(s)	Producer(s)	Length
1.	"Moscow Mule"	Benito Martínez; Marco Borrero; Roberto Rosado; Martin Coogan; Scott Dittrich	Mag; La Paciencia; Mick Coogan; Scotty Dittrich	4:05
2.	"Después de la Playa"	Martínez; Borrero; Rosado; Kaled Rivera	Mag; La Paciencia; Elikai; El Apechao	3:50
3.	"Me Porto Bonito" (with Chencho Corleone)	Martínez; Orlando Valle; Borrero; Rosado; Freddy Montalvo; José Cruz; Joel Rodriguez; Jesús Molina	Mag; Súbelo Neo; La Paciencia; Lennex	2:58
4.	"Tití Me Preguntó"	Martínez; Borrero; Rosado	Mag; La Paciencia	4:03
5.	"Un Ratito"	Martínez; Marco Masís; Rosado; Misael de la Cruz	Tainy; La Paciencia; De la Cruz	2:56
6.	"Yo No Soy Celoso"	Martínez; Marco Masís; Rosado; Ricardo López	Tainy; La Paciencia; Richie López	3:50
7.	"Tarot" (with Jhayco)	Martínez; Jesús Nieves; Juno Watt; Marco Masís; Rosado; Abner Cardero; Alberto Melendez	Tainy; La Paciencia; Albert Hype; Max Borghetti; Jota Rosa	3:57
8.	"Neverita"	Martínez; Kamil Jacob Assad; Marco Masís; Rosado; Jose Arce	Tainy; La Paciencia; Cheo Legendary	2:53
9.	"La Corriente" (with Tony Dize)	Martínez; Tony Feliciano; Marco Masís; Borrero; Rosado; Etienne Pelletier; Montalvo; Cruz; Steve Martínez-Funes	Mag; Demy & Clipz; Súbelo Neo; Tainy; La Paciencia	3:18
10.	"Efecto"	Martínez; Borrero; Rosado; Felicia Ponce; Harissis Tsakmaklis; Jorge Cardoso; Luzian Tuetsch	Mag; La Paciencia; Bass Charity	3:33
11.	"Party" (with Rauw Alejandro)	Martínez; Raúl Ocasio; Marco Masís; Rosado; Melendez; Cordero; Andrea Mangiamarchi	Tainy; La Paciencia; Jota Rosa; Albert Hype; López	3:47
12.	"Aguacero"	Martínez; Borrero; Rosado; Leutrim Beqiri	Mag; La Paciencia; Byrd	3:30
13.	"Enséñame a Bailar"	Martínez; Borrero; Rosado; Joseph Akinfenwa-Donus; Godfrey Ezeani; Lekan Adesinwa	Mag; La Paciencia	2:56
14.	"Ojitos Lindos" (with Bomba Estéreo)	Martínez; Liliana Saumet; Simón Mejía; Marco Masís; Rosado; Michael Masís	Tainy; La Paciencia; Mvsis	4:18
15.	"Dos Mil 16"	Martínez; Borrero; Darwin Quinn; Justin Kim; Felix Rodriguez; Adrian McKinnon	Mag; La Paciencia; MXV; C-Gutta; Hide Miyabi	3:28
16.	"El Apagón"	Martínez; Borrero; Rosado; Hector Pagan; Rosario Joselly	Mag; La Paciencia	3:21
17.	"Otro Atardecer" (with the Marías)	Martínez; María Zardoya; Josh Conway; Borrero; Juan Linares; Jason Garcia	Mag; La Paciencia; Conway; Zulia	4:04
18.	"Un Coco"	Martínez; Borrero; Rosado; Joaquin Calderón; Nicolas Jara	Mag; La Paciencia; Magicenelbeat	3:16
19.	"Andrea" (with Buscabulla)	Martínez; Luis del Valle; Raquel Berríos; Borrero; Rosado; Coogan; Dittrich	Mag; Del Valle; Berríos; Coogan; Dittrich	5:39
20.	"Me Fui de Vacaciones"	Martínez; Marco Masís; López	Tainy; La Paciencia; López	3:00
21.	"Un Verano Sin Ti"	Martínez; Borrero; Rosado; Egbert Rosa; Gabriel Mora	Mag; La Paciencia; Mora; Haze	2:28
22.	"Agosto"	Martínez; Borrero; Rosado; Assad; Harry Ramos; Julian Betancourt	Mag; La Paciencia; Hassi	2:19
23.	"Callaíta" (with Tainy)	Martínez; Marco Masís; Félix Ortiz; Francisco Saldaña; Victor Cabrera	Tainy; Bad Bunny	4:10
Total length:				81:53

Notes

- "Tití Me Preguntó" contains a sample of "No Te Puedo Olvidar", written and performed by Antony Santos.
- "Efecto" contains a sample of "Esta Si", written by Leury Tejada and performed by Chimbala, Chucky73 and Dowba Montana.
- "Enséñame a Bailar" contains a sample of "Empty My Pocket", written by Joseph Akinfenwa-Donus and Godfrey Ezeani, and performed by Joeboy.
- "El Apagón" features uncredited vocals by Gabriela Berlingeri and contains samples of:
  - a radio interview with Ismael Rivera,
  - "Controversia", written by Gilbert Santa Rosa and Victor Ruiz, and performed by Ismael Rivera y Sus Cachimbos,
  - "Vamos a Joder", written by Hector Pagan and Rosario Joselly, and performed by DJ Joe and Great Kilo.
- "Callaíta" contains a sample of "Alócate", written by Felix Ortiz, Francisco Saldaña, Marco Masís and Victor Cabrera, and performed by Zion and Luny Tunes.

== Personnel ==
Credits adapted from Apple Music.

Vocalists

- Bad Bunny – lead vocals
- Chencho Corleone – vocals (track 3)
- Jhayco – vocals (track 7)
- Tony Dize – vocals (track 9)
- Chimbala – vocals (sampled artist) (track 10)
- Rauw Alejandro – vocals (track 11)
- Elena Rose – background vocals (track 11)
- Li Saumet – vocals (track 14)
- María Zardoya – vocals (track 17)
- Raquel Berríos – vocals (track 19)
- Tainy – vocals (track 23)

Technical

- Colin Leonard – mastering
- Josh Gudwin – mixing
- Duran the Coach – recording engineer (track 3)

== Charts ==
=== Weekly charts ===
Weekly chart performance for Un Verano Sin Ti
Chart (2022–2026)	Peak position
Australian Hitseekers Albums (ARIA)	2
Austrian Albums (Ö3 Austria)	19
Belgian Albums (Ultratop Flanders)	25
Belgian Albums (Ultratop Wallonia)	23
Canadian Albums (Billboard)	4
Danish Albums (Hitlisten)	12
Dutch Albums (Album Top 100)	5
French Albums (SNEP)	23
German Albums (Offizielle Top 100)	13
Hungarian Albums (MAHASZ)	18
Irish Albums (Official Charts)	26
Italian Albums (FIMI)	4
Lithuanian Albums (AGATA)	29
Norwegian Albums (VG-lista)	14
Portuguese Albums (AFP)	2
Spanish Albums (Promusicae)	1
Swedish Albums (Sverigetopplistan)	58
Swiss Albums (Schweizer Hitparade)	3
UK Albums (Official Charts)	62
US Billboard 200	1
US Independent Albums (Billboard)	1
US Top Latin Albums (Billboard)	1
US Latin Rhythm Albums (Billboard)	1

=== Year-end charts ===
2022 year-end chart performance for Un Verano Sin Ti
Chart (2022)	Position
Belgian Albums (Ultratop Flanders)	119
Belgian Albums (Ultratop Wallonia)	97
Canadian Albums (Billboard)	44
Dutch Albums (Album Top 100)	49
French Albums (SNEP)	133
Italian Albums (FIMI)	22
Spanish Albums (PROMUSICAE)	1
Swiss Albums (Schweizer Hitparade)	14
US Billboard 200	1
US Independent Albums (Billboard)	1
US Top Latin Albums (Billboard)	1

2023 year-end chart performance for Un Verano Sin Ti
Chart (2023)	Position
Belgian Albums (Ultratop Flanders)	192
Belgian Albums (Ultratop Wallonia)	139
French Albums (SNEP)	138
Italian Albums (FIMI)	30
Spanish Albums (PROMUSICAE)	3
Swiss Albums (Schweizer Hitparade)	13
US Billboard 200	7
US Top Latin Albums (Billboard)	1

2024 year-end chart performance for Un Verano Sin Ti
Chart (2024)	Position
French Albums (SNEP)	182
Italian Albums (FIMI)	84
Portuguese Albums (AFP)	34
Spanish Albums (PROMUSICAE)	5
Swiss Albums (Schweizer Hitparade)	54
US Billboard 200	24
US Top Latin Albums (Billboard)	3

2025 year-end chart performance for Un Verano Sin Ti
Chart (2025)	Position
Belgian Albums (Ultratop Wallonia)	145
Swiss Albums (Schweizer Hitparade)	16
US Billboard 200	42
US Top Latin Albums (Billboard)	3

== Certifications and sales ==
Certifications and sales for Un Verano Sin Ti
Region	Certification	Certified units/sales
Denmark (IFPI Danmark)	Gold	10,000^{‡}
France (SNEP)	Platinum	100,000^{‡}
Italy (FIMI)	4× Platinum	200,000^{‡}
Mexico (AMPROFON)	Diamond+Platinum	840,000^{‡}
New Zealand (RMNZ)	Gold	7,500^{‡}
Portugal (AFP)	Platinum	7,000^{‡}
Spain (Promusicae)	8× Platinum	320,000^{‡}
United Kingdom (BPI)	Gold	100,000^{‡}
^{‡} Sales+streaming figures based on certification alone.

== See also ==
- 2022 in Latin music
- List of Billboard 200 number-one albums of 2022
- List of best-selling albums in Mexico
- List of number-one Billboard Latin Albums from the 2020s
- List of number-one Billboard Latin Rhythm Albums of 2022
- List of number-one Billboard Latin Rhythm Albums of 2023
- List of number-one Billboard Latin Rhythm Albums of 2024
