= El Apagón =

2022 single by Bad Bunny

Single by Bad Bunny

from the album Un Verano Sin Ti
- Language: Spanish
- Released: September 16, 2022
- Genre: Reggaeton; house; techno; bomba
- Length: 3:22
- Label: Rimas
- Songwriter: Benito Martínez
- Producers: MAG; La Paciencia; Nico Spring

Bad Bunny singles chronology
"Neverita" (2022)	"El Apagón" (2022)	"La Jumpa" (2022)

Music video
- "El Apagón - Aquí Vive Gente" on YouTube

"El Apagón" (English: "The Power Outage") is a song by Puerto Rican rapper Bad Bunny from his fifth studio album Un Verano Sin Ti. The song was released as the album's seventh single on September 16, 2022. Themes of the song include gentrification and the power outages. El Apagón is primarily a reggaetón, bomba, and house track that also combines elements of a cappella, samba, techno, electronic, hip-hop, and dance-pop.

== Promotion and release ==
On May 2, 2022, Bad Bunny announced his fifth studio album, Un Verano Sin Ti, on which "El Apagón" is placed at number sixteen on the track list. On May 6, 2022, the song was released alongside the rest of Un Verano Sin Ti through Rimas Entertainment. The track includes an outro sung by Puerto Rican jewelry designer and guest vocalist Gabriela Berlingeri, Bad Bunny's former girlfriend. In May 2022, Bad Bunny sang "El Apagón" during a power outage at El Nie Bar in Santurce, San Juan, Puerto Rico.

== Commercial performance ==
Along with the rest of the tracks from Un Verano Sin Ti, "El Apagón" charted on the Billboard Hot 100, peaking at number 54. It also charted on the Billboard Global 200 along with the other album tracks, charting at number 35. On the US Hot Latin Songs chart, the track peaked at number 19.

== Audio visualizer ==
A 360° audio visualizer for the song was uploaded to YouTube on May 6, 2022 along with the other audio visualizer videos of the songs that appeared on Un Verano Sin Ti.

== Music video ==
Bad Bunny released a 22 minute music video on September 16, 2022. It was an audiovisual project and documentary directed by Kacho Lopez Mari that incorporates reporting done by independent journalist Bianca Graulau. The video criticizes LUMA Energy, Act 22 of 2012, and land and beach privatization.

== Live performances ==
Bad Bunny performed the song as part of his Super Bowl halftime show.

== Charts ==
=== Weekly charts ===
Chart performance for "El Apagón"
Chart (2022)	Peak position
Ecuador (Billboard)	24
Global 200 (Billboard)	35
Mexico (Billboard)	25
Spain (Promusicae)	21
US Billboard Hot 100	54
US Hot Latin Songs (Billboard)	19

Chart (2026)	Peak position
Portugal (AFP)	95

=== Year-end charts ===
2022 year-end chart performance for "El Apagón"
Chart (2022)	Position
US Hot Latin Songs (Billboard)	32

== Certifications ==
Certifications for "El Apagón"
Region	Certification	Certified units/sales
Spain (Promusicae)	Gold	30,000^{‡}
^{‡} Sales+streaming figures based on certification alone.
