= Chencho Corleone =

Puerto Rican singer (born 1979)

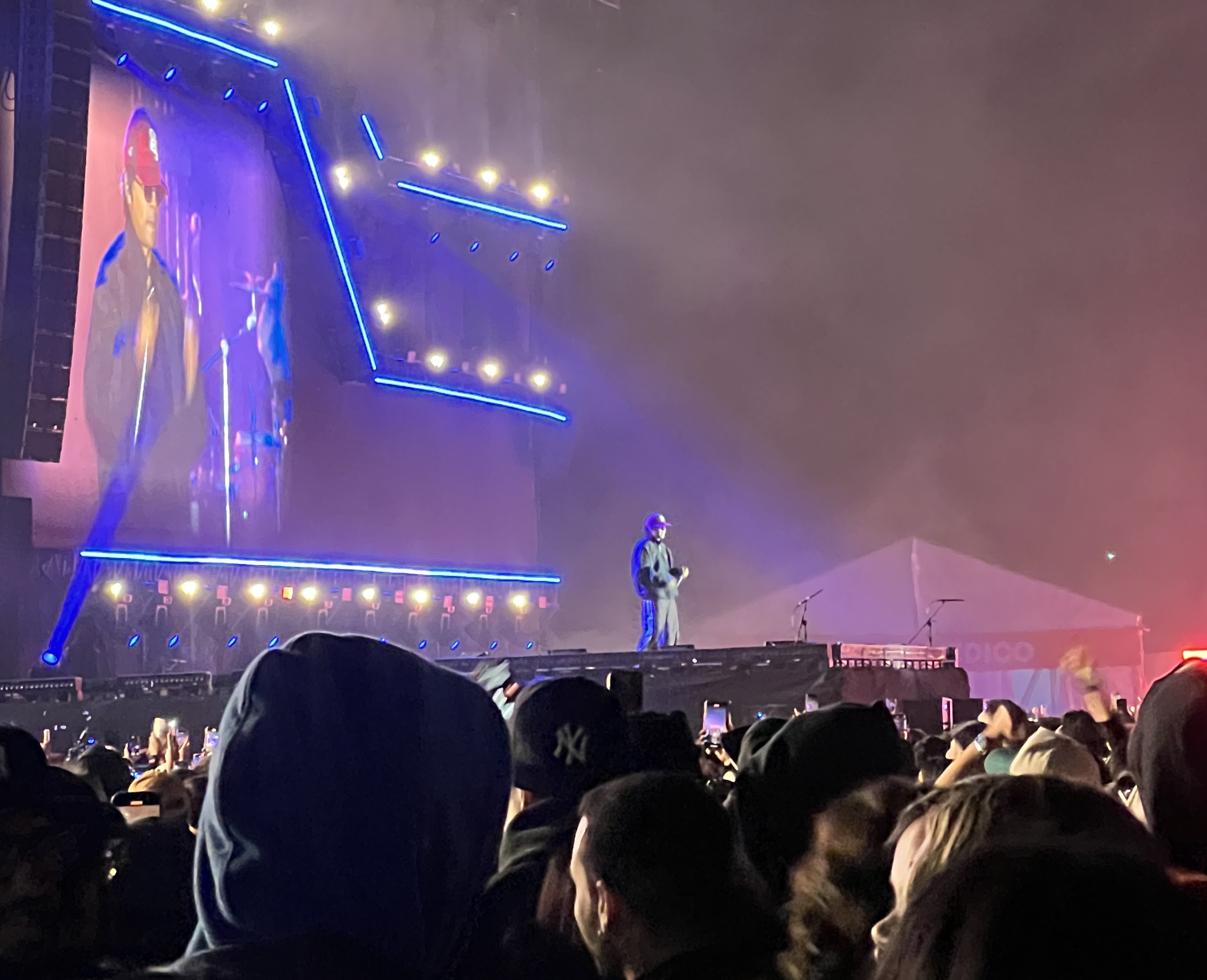
- Chencho Corleone in 2024

Background information
- Also known as: Chencho; Little J; Chencho D; Chenchito; Chencho Man
- Born: Orlando Javier Valle Vega; February 19, 1979 (age 47); Guayama, Puerto Rico
- Genres: Reggaeton
- Occupations: Singer; songwriter; record producer
- Years active: 1999–present
- Labels: Chencho; Pina; Cerco; Sony Latin
- Formerly of: Plan B
- Website: chenchocorleone.com

Orlando Javier Valle Vega (born February 19, 1979), known professionally as Chencho Corleone or simply Chencho, is a Puerto Rican singer, songwriter and record producer. Considered one of the most important figures in the history of reggaeton, he is distinguished by his characteristic voice, which is considered one of the most distinctive and emblematic of the urban genre.

He initially gained visibility with Plan B, a duo he formed with his cousin Maldy in 1999, launching his musical career. Plan B released three albums; Corleone stood out for his performances on "Es un Secreto", "Fanática Sensual", "Si No Le Contesto", "Candy", "Choca" and "Mi Vecinita". Alongside his career with Plan B, he also developed a solo career working as executive producer on the 2005 album El Draft 2005 and collaborating on songs such as "A Que No Te Atreves" with Tito el Bambino, which topped Billboard's Latin Rhythm Airplay and Tropical Airplay charts.

Following the release of the single "El Efecto" with Rauw Alejandro in 2019, he established a fully solo career, participating in various notable remixes such as "105°F (remix)" and "Hola (remix)", as well as other collaborations such as "Una Locura", "Desesperados" and "Me Porto Bonito", which earned him worldwide recognition. In 2023, he signed with the record company Sony Music Latin, under which he released his debut studio album as a soloist, Solo (2024).

== Awards and nominations ==
Awards	Year	Category	Recipient(s)	Result	Ref.
American Music Awards	2022	Favorite Music Video	"Me Porto Bonito" (with Bad Bunny)	Nominated	
American Music Awards	2022	Favorite Latin Song	"Me Porto Bonito" (with Bad Bunny)	Nominated	
ASCAP Latin Awards	2023	Song of the Year	"Me Porto Bonito" (with Bad Bunny)	Won	
ASCAP Latin Awards	2023	Winning Songs	"Desesperados" (with Rauw Alejandro)	Won	
Billboard Latin Music Awards	2022	Hot Latin Songs Artist of the Year, Male	Himself	Nominated	
Billboard Latin Music Awards	2022	Hot Latin Song of the Year	"Me Porto Bonito" (with Bad Bunny)	Nominated	
Billboard Latin Music Awards	2022	Hot Latin Song of the Year, Vocal Event	"Me Porto Bonito" (with Bad Bunny)	Nominated	
Billboard Latin Music Awards	2022	Latin Rhythm Song of the Year	"Me Porto Bonito" (with Bad Bunny)	Nominated	
BMI Latin Awards	2023	Winning Songs	"Me Porto Bonito" (with Bad Bunny)	Won	
BMI Latin Awards	2024	Winning Songs	"Desesperados" (with Rauw Alejandro)	Won	
E! People's Choice Awards	2022	The Song of 2022	"Me Porto Bonito" (with Bad Bunny)	Nominated	
Grammy Awards	2023	Album of the Year	Un Verano Sin Ti (as songwriter)	Nominated	
Heat Latin Music Awards	2023	Song of the Year	"Me Porto Bonito" (with Bad Bunny)	Nominated	
iHeartRadio Music Awards	2023	Latin Pop/Reggaeton Song of the Year	"Me Porto Bonito" (with Bad Bunny)	Nominated	
Latin American Music Awards	2023	Streaming Artist of the Year	Himself	Nominated	
Latin American Music Awards	2023	Song of the Year	"Me Porto Bonito" (with Bad Bunny)	Nominated	
Latin American Music Awards	2023	Collaboration of the Year	"Me Porto Bonito" (with Bad Bunny)	Nominated	
Latin American Music Awards	2023	Best Collaboration – Pop/Urban	"Me Porto Bonito" (with Bad Bunny)	Nominated	
Latin American Music Awards	2023	Favorite Urban Song	"Desesperados" (with Rauw Alejandro)	Nominated	
Latin American Music Awards	2024	Best Urban Song	"Un Cigarrillo"	Nominated	
Latin American Music Awards	2024	Best Urban Collaboration	"Me Porto Bonito" (with Bad Bunny)	Nominated	
Latin Grammy Awards	2022	Album of the Year	Un Verano Sin Ti (as songwriter)	Nominated	
Latin Grammy Awards	2022	Best Reggaeton Performance	"Desesperados" (with Rauw Alejandro)	Nominated	
Latin Grammy Awards	2022	Best Urban Song	"Desesperados" (with Rauw Alejandro)	Nominated	
Latin Grammy Awards	2026	Best Reggaeton Performance	"Choque" (with Bad Gyal)	Pending	
Latino Show Awards	2022	Best Urban Music Video	"Desesperados" (with Rauw Alejandro)	Nominated	
Latino Show Awards	2022	Best Urban Song	"Desesperados" (with Rauw Alejandro)	Nominated	
MTV Europe Music Awards	2022	Best Song	"Me Porto Bonito" (with Bad Bunny)	Nominated	
MTV Europe Music Awards	2022	Best Collaboration	"Me Porto Bonito" (with Bad Bunny)	Nominated	
MTV Video Music Awards	2022	Song of Summer	"Me Porto Bonito" (with Bad Bunny)	Nominated	
Premios Juventud	2023	Best Urban Mix	"Desesperados" (with Rauw Alejandro)	Nominated	
Premios Juventud	2023	Best Urban Mix	"Me Porto Bonito" (with Bad Bunny)	Nominated	
Premios Juventud	2023	Best Urban Mix	"Nos Comemos Vivos" (with Maluma)	Nominated	
Premios Juventud	2024	Best Urban Track	"Un Cigarrillo"	Nominated	
Premios Juventud	2024	Best Urban Mix	"Podemos Repetirlo" (with Don Omar)	Nominated	
Premios Juventud	2025	Best Urban Track	"Polvo de Tu Vida" (with J Balvin)	Nominated	
Premios Juventud	2026	Best Urban Mix	"Incorregible" (with Jory Boy)	Nominated	
Premios Lo Nuestro	2021	Remix of the Year	"La Cama (Remix)" (with Lunay, Myke Towers, Ozuna & Rauw Alejandro)	Nominated	
Premios Lo Nuestro	2023	Urban Song of the Year	"Desesperados" (with Rauw Alejandro)	Nominated	
Premios Lo Nuestro	2023	Urban Collaboration of the Year	"Me Porto Bonito" (with Bad Bunny)	Won	
Premios Lo Nuestro	2024	Remix of the Year	"Podemos Repetirlo (Remix)" (with Don Omar & Anuel AA)	Nominated	
Premios Lo Nuestro	2024	Urban Collaboration of the Year	"Podemos Repetirlo (Remix)" (with Don Omar & Anuel AA)	Nominated	
Premios Lo Nuestro	2024	Urban Song of the Year	"Un Cigarrillo"	Nominated	
Premios Lo Nuestro	2025	Male Urban Artist of the Year	Himself	Nominated	
Premios Lo Nuestro	2025	Urban Collaboration of the Year	"Polvo de Tu Vida" (with J Balvin)	Nominated	
Premios Lo Nuestro	2026	Urban Song of the Year	"Lo Caro Y Lo Bueno"	Nominated	
Premios Tu Música Urbano	2020	Remix of the Year - New Generation	"105 F (Remix)" (with Kevvo, Farruko, Myke Towers, Arcángel, Ñengo Flow and Brytiago)	Nominated	
Premios Tu Música Urbano	2022	Collaboration of the Year	"Desesperados" (with Rauw Alejandro)	Nominated	
Premios Tu Música Urbano	2023	Song of the Year	"Me Porto Bonito" (with Bad Bunny)	Nominated	
Premios Tu Música Urbano	2023	Video of the Year	"La Llevo al Cielo" (with Chris Jedi, Anuel AA & Ñengo Flow)	Nominated	
Premios Tu Música Urbano	2025	Dedication Special Award	Himself	Won	
Premios Tu Música Urbano	2025	Collaboration of the Year	"Humo" (with Peso Pluma)	Nominated	
Premios Tu Música Urbano	2025	Album of the Year - Male	Solo	Nominated	
