= Tití Me Preguntó =

Single by Bad Bunny

from the album Un Verano Sin Ti
- Language: Spanish
- Released: June 1, 2022
- Genre: Dominican dembow; Latin trap; bachata
- Length: 4:05
- Label: Rimas
- Songwriters: Benito Martínez; MAG
- Producer: MAG

Bad Bunny singles chronology
| "Moscow Mule" (2022) | "Tití Me Preguntó" (2022) | "Después de la Playa" (2022) |

Music video
- "Tití Me Preguntó" on YouTube

"Tití Me Preguntó" (English: "Auntie Asked Me") is a song by Puerto Rican rapper Bad Bunny. Tití is a colloquial term in Puerto Rico for an aunt. The song samples "No Te Puedo Olvidar" by the Dominican musician Antony "El Mayimbe" Santos, which can be heard throughout the song. It was originally released on May 6, 2022, by Rimas Entertainment as the fourth track of Bad Bunny's fifth studio album Un Verano Sin Ti (2022) before being released on June 1, 2022, as the second single from the album. The song was written by Bad Bunny with MAG handling the production. The genre-fusing shapeshifting song combines elements of Dominican dembow, Latin trap, psychedelia, and bachata. The song was acclaimed by music critics, with Rolling Stone magazine ranking it as the best song of 2022.

== Promotion and release ==
On May 2, 2022, Bad Bunny announced his fifth studio album, Un Verano Sin Ti, on which "Tití Me Preguntó" appears at number four on the tracklist. On May 6, 2022, "Tití Me Preguntó" was released alongside the rest of Un Verano Sin Ti through Rimas Entertainment before releasing it on June 1, 2022, as the third single from the album upon the release of its music video on YouTube.

== Commercial performance ==
Following the release of its parent album, "Tití Me Preguntó" charted at number 5 on the US Billboard Hot 100 dated May 21, 2022, becoming the second-highest charting track from Un Verano Sin Ti behind "Moscow Mule", which peaked at number 4. Additionally, it peaked at number 1 on the US Hot Latin Songs chart as well as peaking at number 4 on the Billboard Global 200 upon the issue date of June 11, 2022. Upon the issue date of May 29, 2022, "Tití Me Preguntó" reached number one in Spain.

== Audio visualizer ==
A 360° audio visualizer for the song was uploaded to YouTube on May 6, 2022, along with the other audio visualizer videos of the songs that appeared on Un Verano Sin Ti.

== Meaning ==
In the song, the singer addresses his own promiscuity, desire to treat all his partners well, and sexual process. Translated into English, the lyrics begin with "Hey, auntie asked me if I have a lot of girlfriends ... Today I have one, tomorrow I'll have another, hey, but there's no wedding ... I'm gonna take them all to the VIP, the VIP."

And later: "The one from Barcelona that came by plane / And says that my dick is fire / I let them play with my heart / I'd like to move in with all of them to a mansion / The day I get married I'll send them an invitation."

The song's final verse includes a warning to the singer's lovers. "I'm gonna break your heart, break your heart / Hey, don't fall in love with me (No, no)."

== Music video ==
The music video for "Tití Me Preguntó" was released on YouTube on June 1, 2022. It was filmed primarily in Spanish Harlem, Manhattan, in New York City and directed by Stillz. As of January 2026, the music video has over 1 billion views on YouTube.

== Live performances ==
Bad Bunny performed it as the first song in his Super Bowl halftime show.

== Charts ==
=== Weekly charts ===
Weekly chart performance for "Tití Me Preguntó"
| Chart (2022–2023) | Peak position |
|---|---|
| Argentina Hot 100 (Billboard) | 5 |
| Bolivia (Billboard) | 3 |
| Bolivia (Monitor Latino) | 6 |
| Canada Hot 100 (Billboard) | 80 |
| Central America (Monitor Latino) | 1 |
| Chile (Billboard) | 6 |
| Chile (Monitor Latino) | 10 |
| Colombia (Billboard) | 2 |
| Colombia Airplay (Monitor Latino) | 6 |
| Costa Rica (Monitor Latino) | 7 |
| Costa Rica (FONOTICA) | 1 |
| Dominican Republic (Monitor Latino) | 9 |
| Ecuador (Billboard) | 2 |
| Ecuador (Monitor Latino) | 8 |
| El Salvador (Monitor Latino) | 1 |
| France (SNEP) | 186 |
| Global 200 (Billboard) | 4 |
| Guatemala (Monitor Latino) | 13 |
| Honduras (Monitor Latino) | 1 |
| Italy (FIMI) | 8 |
| Latin America (Monitor Latino) | 5 |
| Mexico (Billboard) | 2 |
| Mexico Streaming (AMPROFON) | 2 |
| Nicaragua (Monitor Latino) | 1 |
| Panama (Monitor Latino) | 4 |
| Paraguay (Monitor Latino) | 9 |
| Peru (Billboard) | 2 |
| Peru (Monitor Latino) | 6 |
| Portugal (AFP) | 9 |
| Spain (Promusicae) | 1 |
| Switzerland (Schweizer Hitparade) | 37 |
| US Billboard Hot 100 | 5 |
| US Hot Latin Songs (Billboard) | 1 |
| US Latin Rhythm Airplay (Billboard) | 1 |
| US Rhythmic Airplay (Billboard) | 14 |

| Chart (2026) | Peak position |
|---|---|
| Austria (Ö3 Austria Top 40) | 6 |
| Belgium (Ultratop 50 Wallonia) | 41 |
| Canada Hot 100 (Billboard) | 6 |
| Colombia Hot 100 (Billboard) | 63 |
| Costa Rica Streaming (FONOTICA) | 16 |
| Croatia (Billboard) | 18 |
| Czech Republic Singles Digital (ČNS IFPI) | 36 |
| Denmark (Tracklisten) | 10 |
| Finland (Suomen virallinen lista) | 30 |
| France (SNEP) | 14 |
| Germany (GfK) | 20 |
| Greece International (IFPI) | 1 |
| Hungary (Single Top 40) | 16 |
| Iceland (Billboard) | 8 |
| Ireland (IRMA) | 12 |
| Israel (Mako Hitlist) | 16 |
| Lithuania (AGATA) | 4 |
| Luxembourg (Billboard) | 3 |
| Middle East and North Africa (IFPI) | 10 |
| Netherlands (Single Top 100) | 17 |
| Norway (IFPI Norge) | 25 |
| Poland (Polish Streaming Top 100) | 48 |
| Portugal (AFP) | 4 |
| Romania (Billboard) | 3 |
| Singapore (RIAS) | 27 |
| Slovakia Singles Digital (ČNS IFPI) | 4 |
| Sweden (Sverigetopplistan) | 17 |
| Switzerland (Schweizer Hitparade) | 3 |
| United Arab Emirates (IFPI) | 10 |
| UK Singles (Official Charts) | 18 |
| UK Indie (Official Charts) | 5 |
| US Hot Latin Rhythm Songs (Billboard) | 2 |

=== Year-end charts ===
2022 year-end chart performance for "Tití Me Preguntó"
| Chart (2022) | Position |
|---|---|
| Global 200 (Billboard) | 13 |
| Italy (FIMI) | 50 |
| Spain (PROMUSICAE) | 4 |
| Switzerland (Schweizer Hitparade) | 94 |
| US Billboard Hot 100 | 22 |
| US Hot Latin Songs (Billboard) | 2 |

2023 year-end chart performance for "Tití Me Preguntó"
| Chart (2023) | Position |
|---|---|
| Global 200 (Billboard) | 50 |
| Italy (FIMI) | 77 |
| US Hot Latin Songs (Billboard) | 7 |

== Certifications ==
Certifications and sales for "Tití Me Preguntó"
| Region | Certification | Certified units/sales |
|---|---|---|
| Denmark (IFPI Danmark) | Gold | 45,000^{‡} |
| France (SNEP) | Diamond | 333,333^{‡} |
| Italy (FIMI) | 4× Platinum | 400,000^{‡} |
| New Zealand (RMNZ) | Gold | 15,000^{‡} |
| Portugal (AFP) | 5× Platinum | 50,000^{‡} |
| Spain (Promusicae) | 9× Platinum | 900,000^{‡} |
| United Kingdom (BPI) | Silver | 200,000^{‡} |
Streaming
| Greece (IFPI Greece) | 2× Platinum | 4,000,000^{†} |
^{‡} Sales+streaming figures based on certification alone.^{†} Streaming-only figures based on certification alone.

== See also ==
- List of Billboard Hot 100 top-ten singles in 2022
- List of Billboard Hot Latin Songs and Latin Airplay number ones of 2022
- List of best-selling Latin singles
