= Moscow Mule (song) =

Single by Bad Bunny

from the album Un Verano Sin Ti
- Language: Spanish
- Released: May 6, 2022
- Genre: Reggaeton; synthwave
- Length: 4:05
- Label: Rimas
- Songwriters: Benito Martínez, MAG, Mick Coogan, Scott Dittrich
- Producers: MAG; Mick; Scott

Bad Bunny singles chronology
"X Última Vez" (2022)	"Moscow Mule" (2022)	"Tití Me Preguntó" (2022)

Music video
- "Moscow Mule" on YouTube

"Moscow Mule" is a song by Puerto Rican rapper Bad Bunny. It was released on May 6, 2022 as the lead single from his fourth studio album Un Verano Sin Ti (2022) following "Callaíta" (2019). The song's title refers to the cocktail of the same name.

== Music video ==
The song's music video was directed by Stillz and shows Bad Bunny as a merman.

== Charts ==
=== Weekly charts ===
Chart performance for "Moscow Mule"
Chart (2022)	Peak position
Argentina Hot 100 (Billboard)	8
Bolivia (Billboard)	2
Canada Hot 100 (Billboard)	50
Chile (Billboard)	1
Colombia (Billboard)	2
Costa Rica (Monitor Latino)	19
Costa Rica (FONOTICA)	2
Ecuador (Billboard)	1
France (SNEP)	141
Global 200 (Billboard)	2
Honduras (Monitor Latino)	9
Ireland (IRMA)	74
Italy (FIMI)	77
Latin America (Monitor Latino)	10
Luxembourg (Billboard)	23
Mexico (Billboard)	1
Mexico (AMPROFON)	6
Netherlands (Single Tip)	7
New Zealand Hot Singles (RMNZ)	25
Nicaragua (Monitor Latino)	9
Paraguay (Monitor Latino)	4
Peru (Billboard)	1
Portugal (AFP)	32
Spain (PROMUSICAE)	1
Sweden Heatseeker (Sverigetopplistan)	16
Switzerland (Schweizer Hitparade)	25
US Billboard Hot 100	4
US Hot Latin Songs (Billboard)	1
US Latin Airplay (Billboard)	1
US Latin Rhythm Airplay (Billboard)	1
US Rhythmic Airplay (Billboard)	23

=== Year-end charts ===
2022 year-end chart performance for "Moscow Mule"
Chart (2022)	Position
Global 200 (Billboard)	26
Spain (PROMUSICAE)	17
US Billboard Hot 100	44
US Hot Latin Songs (Billboard)	3

2023 year-end chart performance for "Moscow Mule"
Chart (2023)	Position
Global 200 (Billboard)	168
US Hot Latin Songs (Billboard)	62

== Certifications ==
Certifications for "Moscow Mule"
Region	Certification	Certified units/sales
France (SNEP)	Gold	100,000^{‡}
Italy (FIMI)	Gold	50,000^{‡}
Portugal (AFP)	2× Platinum	50,000^{‡}
Spain (Promusicae)	6× Platinum	600,000^{‡}
^{‡} Sales+streaming figures based on certification alone.

== See also ==
- List of Billboard Hot Latin Songs and Latin Airplay number ones of 2022
- List of number-one singles of 2022 (Spain)
