= Asociación Costarricense de la Industria Fonográfica y Afines =

- Abbreviation: FONOTICA
- Formation: June 7, 2004
- Type: Technical standards, licensing and royalties
- Legal status: Association
- Purpose: Trade organization protecting music production companies' interests
- Headquarters: San José, Costa Rica
- Location: Costa Rica
- Affiliations: IFPI
- Website: www.fonotica.com

The Asociación Costarricense de la Industria Fonográfica y Afines (FONOTICA) (English: Costa Rican Association of the Phonographic and Related Industry) is a non-profit organization and industry trade group integrated by multinational and national record companies in Costa Rica composed of various Costa Rican corporations involved in the music industry. It serves as the affiliate member of the International Federation of the Phonographic Industry (IFPI) in the country and also serves as the national ISRC agency.

== History ==
The organization was established on June 7, 2004. It is responsible for making sure music is protected by national laws and international copyright and related rights treaties. It adds an added value to the service chain of companies that use music to attract customers, stimulate productivity or offer entertainment and culture to the general public. It also contributes to the growth of the economy, of the Gross Domestic Product (GDP) and of tax collection.

== Music charts ==
FONOTICA publishes a weekly chart for the top 20 streamed songs in both Costa Rica and all of Central America. The charts are based on the information compiled and sent by the BMAT company which receives the streaming reports from the participation digital platform.

The charts are updated weekly on their website and previous charts are found archived online.

== Certification levels and methodology ==
Since 2021, certification levels and methodologies have been established by the Certificación Fonográfica Centroamericana.

== See also ==
- Monitor Latino
