= Billboard Hot Latin Songs Year-End Chart =

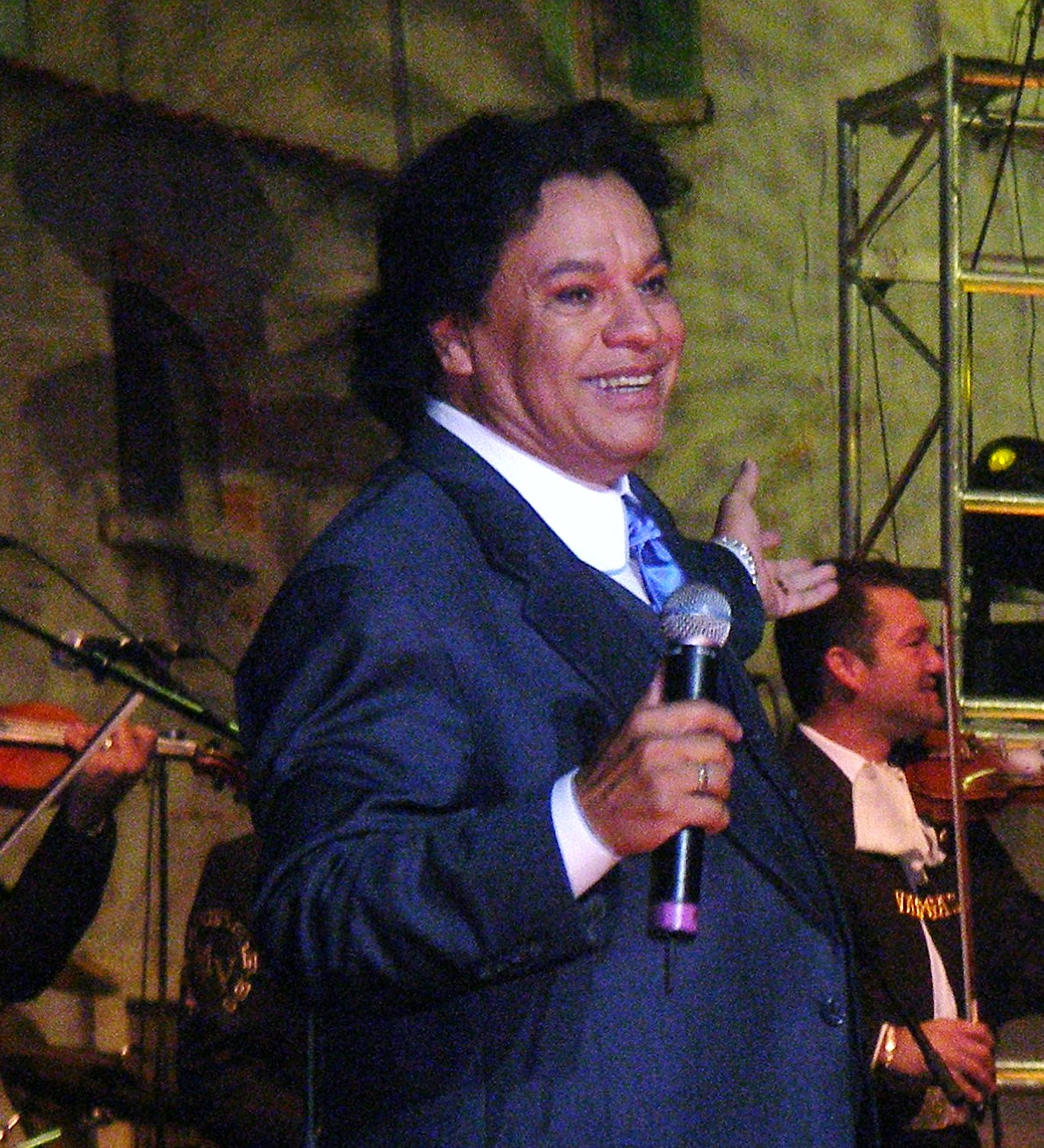
Mexican singer-songwriter Juan Gabriel had the best-performing Latin single in 1997, 1998 and 2001.

The year-end charts for the Hot Latin Songs chart are published in the last issue of Billboard magazine every year. Initially, the chart was based on information provided by Nielsen Broadcast Data Systems, which collected airplay information from Latin radio stations in the United States. On the week ending October 20, 2012, the methodology was changed to track the best-performing Spanish-language songs based on digital downloads, streaming activity, and airplay from all radio stations in the country. The Year-End charts represent aggregated numbers from the weekly charts that were compiled for each artist, song and record company.

Mexican singer-songwriters Ana Gabriel and Juan Gabriel have had the best-selling single of the year three times each. The Latin Academy of Recording Arts & Sciences awarded Juan Gabriel the Person of Year Award for his professional accomplishments and commitment to philanthropic efforts. Venezuelan singer Franco De Vita's "Te Amo" ranked at number eight in 1989 and received a gold certification in Latin America and Spain for the album Al Norte del Sur. De Vita also wrote "Tal Vez", performed by Ricky Martin, the number-one single of 2003. Billboard magazine posthumously named singer Selena the Top Artist of the 1990s, due to her fourteen top-ten singles in the Hot Latin Songs chart (including seven number-one hits). Selena had the most successful singles of 1994 and 1995, "Amor Prohibido" and "No Me Queda Más".

Cuban singer-songwriter Jon Secada released the best-selling Latin album of 1992, titled Otro Día Más Sin Verte. The album earned a Grammy Award for Best Latin Pop Album, and yielded three singles, "Angel", "Sentir" and the title song, which were among the top Latin singles from 1992 and 1993. Alejandro Fernández released his album Me Estoy Enamorando in 1997; its first single "Si Tú Supieras" won the Lo Nuestro Award for Pop Song of the Year and ended 1998 as the second most successful single. During the 1990s, Mexican singer Luis Miguel became the first Latin singer to receive two platinum certifications in the United States with his albums Romance and Segundo Romance; he also had eight songs ranking as top singles of the year.

"A Puro Dolor", performed by Son by Four, became the best-performing Latin single from the 2000s in the United States. "Despacito" by Luis Fonsi and Daddy Yankee featuring Justin Bieber holds the record for the longest run at number one in the Hot Latin Songs chart. It held this position for 56 non-consecutive weeks, and finished as the Top Latin Single of 2017 and 2018. The Spanish versions of "Livin' la Vida Loca" by Ricky Martin, "Bailamos" by Enrique Iglesias and "Hips Don't Lie" by Shakira featuring Wyclef Jean were among the most successful Latin singles of 1999 and 2006. The English versions of these songs all peaked at number one in the Billboard Hot 100. With his song "No Me Doy Por Vencido", Puerto Rican singer Luis Fonsi became the first artist to appear in the top ten for two consecutive years for the best-performing Latin singles with the same track.

== Top Songs of the Year ==
‡ – represents the best-performing single of the year.

| Year | Rank | Single | Performer |
|---|---|---|---|
| 1987 | 1 | "De Mí Enamórate" ‡ | Daniela Romo |
| 1987 | 2 | "En Bancarrota" | Braulio García |
| 1987 | 3 | "Tú Carcel" | Los Bukis |
| 1987 | 4 | "Hasta Que Te Conocí" | Juan Gabriel |
| 1987 | 5 | "Es Mi Mujer" | Emmanuel |
| 1987 | 6 | "El Pecado" | Amanda Miguel |
| 1987 | 7 | "Lo Mejor de Tu Vida" | Julio Iglesias |
| 1987 | 8 | "Doce Rosas" | Lorenzo Antonio |
| 1987 | 9 | "Tu Dama de Hierro" | Marisela |
| 1987 | 10 | "¿Y Quién Puede Ser?" | José José |
| 1988 | 1 | "Ay Amor" ‡ | Ana Gabriel |
| 1988 | 2 | "Qué Te Pasa" | Yuri |
| 1988 | 3 | "Y Tú También Llorarás" | José Luis Rodríguez "El Puma" |
| 1988 | 4 | "María" | Franco |
| 1988 | 5 | "Debo Hacerlo" | Juan Gabriel |
| 1988 | 6 | "Toco Madera" | Raphael |
| 1988 | 7 | "Soy Así" | José José |
| 1988 | 8 | "Un Alma en Pena" | Lucía Méndez |
| 1988 | 9 | "La Ultima Luna" | Emmanuel |
| 1988 | 10 | "Negra" | Roberto Carlos |
| 1989 | 1 | "Como Tu Mujer" ‡ | Rocío Dúrcal |
| 1989 | 2 | "Baila Mi Rumba" | José Luis Rodríguez "El Puma" |
| 1989 | 3 | "La Incondicional" | Luis Miguel |
| 1989 | 4 | "Como Tú" | José José |
| 1989 | 5 | "Así Fue" | Isabel Pantoja |
| 1989 | 6 | "Simplemente Amigos" | Ana Gabriel |
| 1989 | 7 | "Mala Suerte" | Vikki Carr |
| 1989 | 8 | "Te Amo" | Franco De Vita |
| 1989 | 9 | "Hombres al Borde de un Ataque de Celos" | Yuri |
| 1989 | 10 | "A Donde Vayas" | Los Bukis |
| 1990 | 1 | "El Cariño Es Como Una Flor" ‡ | Rudy La Scala |
| 1990 | 2 | "Tengo Todo Excepto a Tí" | Luis Miguel |
| 1990 | 3 | "Cómo Fuí a Enamorarme de Tí" | Los Bukis |
| 1990 | 4 | "Quiero Amanecer con Alguien" | Daniela Romo |
| 1990 | 5 | "La Cima del Cielo" | Ricardo Montaner |
| 1990 | 6 | "Quién Como Tú" | Ana Gabriel |
| 1990 | 7 | "Lambada" | Kaoma |
| 1990 | 8 | "Burbujas de Amor" | Juan Luis Guerra |
| 1990 | 9 | "Amnesia" | José José |
| 1990 | 10 | "Me Va a Extrañar" | Ricardo Montaner |
| 1991 | 1 | "Es Demasiado Tarde" ‡ | Ana Gabriel |
| 1991 | 2 | "Todo, Todo, Todo" | Daniela Romo |
| 1991 | 3 | "Mi Deseo" | Los Bukis |
| 1991 | 4 | "Cosas del Amor" | Vikki Carr and Ana Gabriel |
| 1991 | 5 | "Sopa de Caracol" | Banda Blanca |
| 1991 | 6 | "Te Pareces Tanto a Él" | Myriam Hernández |
| 1991 | 7 | "Déjame Llorar" | Ricardo Montaner |
| 1991 | 8 | "No Basta" | Franco De Vita |
| 1991 | 9 | "Ahora" | Ana Gabriel |
| 1991 | 10 | "No He Podido Verte" | Emmanuel |
| 1992 | 1 | "Evidencias" ‡ | Ana Gabriel |
| 1992 | 2 | "No Sé Tú" | Luis Miguel |
| 1992 | 3 | "Inolvidable" | Luis Miguel |
| 1992 | 4 | "Otro Día Más Sin Verte" | Jon Secada |
| 1992 | 5 | "Mi Mayor Necesidad" | Los Bukis |
| 1992 | 6 | "Amor Mío, ¿Qué Me Has Hecho?" | Camilo Sesto |
| 1992 | 7 | "Si Piensas, Si Quieres" | Roberto Carlos and Rocío Dúrcal |
| 1992 | 8 | "El Centro de Mi Corazón" | Chayanne |
| 1992 | 9 | "Angel" | Jon Secada |
| 1992 | 10 | "Torero" | José Luis Rodríguez "El Puma" and Julio Iglesias |
| 1993 | 1 | "Me Estoy Enamorando" ‡ | La Mafia |
| 1993 | 2 | "Mi Tierra" | Gloria Estefan |
| 1993 | 3 | "Castillo Azul" | Ricardo Montaner |
| 1993 | 4 | "Nunca Voy a Olvidarte" | Cristian Castro |
| 1993 | 5 | "Muchacha Triste" | Los Fantasmas del Caribe |
| 1993 | 6 | "Ayer" | Luis Miguel |
| 1993 | 7 | "Sentir" | Jon Secada |
| 1993 | 8 | "Piel Adentro" | Ricardo Montaner |
| 1993 | 9 | "Un Corazón Hecho Pedazos" | Ednita Nazario |
| 1993 | 10 | "Lástima Que Seas Ajena" | Vicente Fernández |
| 1994 | 1 | "Amor Prohibido" ‡ | Selena |
| 1994 | 2 | "Vida" | La Mafia |
| 1994 | 3 | "Luna" | Ana Gabriel |
| 1994 | 4 | "Pero Qué Necesidad" | Juan Gabriel |
| 1994 | 5 | "Si Te Vas" | Jon Secada |
| 1994 | 6 | "Donde Quiera Que Estés" | Barrio Boyzz featuring Selena |
| 1994 | 7 | "Bidi Bidi Bom Bom" | Selena |
| 1994 | 8 | "Quisiera" | Ricardo Montaner |
| 1994 | 9 | "Detrás de Mi Ventana" | Yuri |
| 1994 | 10 | "El Día Que Me Quieras" | Luis Miguel |
| 1995 | 1 | "No Me Queda Más" ‡ | Selena |
| 1995 | 2 | "Fotos y Recuerdos" | Selena |
| 1995 | 3 | "Tú Sólo Tú" | Selena |
| 1995 | 4 | "Que No Me Olvide" | Grupo Bronco |
| 1995 | 5 | "I Could Fall in Love" | Selena |
| 1995 | 6 | "Una Mujer Como Tú" | Marco Antonio Solís and Los Bukis |
| 1995 | 7 | "Nadie" | La Mafia |
| 1995 | 8 | "Mi Forma de Sentir" | Pedro Fernández |
| 1995 | 9 | "Toma Mi Amor" | La Mafia |
| 1995 | 10 | "La Media Vuelta" | Luis Miguel |
| 1996 | 1 | "Un Millón de Rosas" ‡ | La Mafia |
| 1996 | 2 | "Amor" | Cristian Castro |
| 1996 | 3 | "Por Amarte" | Enrique Iglesias |
| 1996 | 4 | "Que Pena Me Das" | Marco Antonio Solís |
| 1996 | 5 | "Como Te Extraño" | Pete Astudillo |
| 1996 | 6 | "Si Tú Te Vas" | Enrique Iglesias |
| 1996 | 7 | "No Te Vayas" | Intocable |
| 1996 | 8 | "Amarte a Tí" | Cristian Castro |
| 1996 | 9 | "No Llores Por Mí" | Enrique Iglesias |
| 1996 | 10 | "Te Aprovechas" | Grupo Limite |
| 1997 | 1 | "Te Sigo Amando" ‡ | Juan Gabriel |
| 1997 | 2 | "El Destino" | Juan Gabriel and Rocío Dúrcal |
| 1997 | 3 | "Ya Me Voy Para Siempre" | Los Temerarios |
| 1997 | 4 | "Enamorado Por Primera Vez" | Enrique Iglesias |
| 1997 | 5 | "Piensa en Mí" | Grupo Mojado |
| 1997 | 6 | "Sólo en Tí" | Enrique Iglesias |
| 1997 | 7 | "Así Como Te Conocí" | Marco Antonio Solís |
| 1997 | 8 | "Por Debajo de la Mesa" | Luis Miguel |
| 1997 | 9 | "Desesperadamente Enamorado" | Jordi |
| 1997 | 10 | "Juguete" | Grupo Limite |
| 1998 | 1 | "Así Fue" ‡ | Juan Gabriel |
| 1998 | 2 | "Si Tú Supieras" | Alejandro Fernández |
| 1998 | 3 | "A Pesar de Todos" | Ana Gabriel |
| 1998 | 4 | "Vuelve" | Ricky Martin |
| 1998 | 5 | "Por Mujeres Como Tú" | Pepe Aguilar |
| 1998 | 6 | "No Sé Olvidar" | Alejandro Fernández |
| 1998 | 7 | "Yo Nací Para Amarte" | Alejandro Fernández |
| 1998 | 8 | "En el Jardín" | Alejandro Fernández featuring Gloria Estefan |
| 1998 | 9 | "Por Qué Te Conocí" | Los Temerarios |
| 1998 | 10 | "Suavemente" | Elvis Crespo |
| 1999 | 1 | "Necesito Decirte" ‡ | Conjunto Primavera |
| 1999 | 2 | "Loco" | Alejandro Fernández |
| 1999 | 3 | "No Me Ames" | Jennifer Lopez and Marc Anthony |
| 1999 | 4 | "Me Voy a Quitar de En Medio" | Vicente Fernández |
| 1999 | 5 | "Livin' la Vida Loca" | Ricky Martin |
| 1999 | 6 | "Si Te Pudiera Mentir" | Marco Antonio Solís |
| 1999 | 7 | "Bailamos" | Enrique Iglesias |
| 1999 | 8 | "Dejaría Todo" | Chayanne |
| 1999 | 9 | "Me Estoy Acostumbrando a Tí" | Pepe Aguilar |
| 1999 | 10 | "Creí" | Tiranos del Norte |
| 2000 | 1 | "A Puro Dolor" ‡ | Son by Four |
| 2000 | 2 | "Que Alguien Me Diga" | Gilberto Santa Rosa |
| 2000 | 3 | "Fruta Fresca" | Carlos Vives |
| 2000 | 4 | "Secreto de Amor" | Joan Sebastian |
| 2000 | 5 | "El Listón de Tu Pelo" | Los Angeles Azules |
| 2000 | 6 | "Muy Dentro de Mí" | Marc Anthony |
| 2000 | 7 | "Te Hice Mal" | Los Temerarios |
| 2000 | 8 | "Dímelo" | Marc Anthony |
| 2000 | 9 | "Yo Sé Que Te Acordarás" | Banda el Recodo |
| 2000 | 10 | "Desnuda" | Ricardo Arjona |
| 2001 | 1 | "Abrázame Muy Fuerte" ‡ | Juan Gabriel |
| 2001 | 2 | "Azul" | Cristian Castro |
| 2001 | 3 | "Te Quisé Olvidar" | MDO |
| 2001 | 4 | "O Me Voy o Te Vas" | Marco Antonio Solís |
| 2001 | 5 | "Por Amarte Así" | Cristian Castro |
| 2001 | 6 | "Cómo Se Cura una Herida" | Jaci Velasquez |
| 2001 | 7 | "Yo Te Amo" | Chayanne |
| 2001 | 8 | "La Bomba" | Azul Azul |
| 2001 | 9 | "Despreciado" | Lupillo Rivera |
| 2001 | 10 | "No Me Conoces Aún" | Palomo |
| 2002 | 1 | "Y Tú Te Vas" ‡ | Chayanne |
| 2002 | 2 | "Quítame Ese Hombre" | Pilar Montenegro |
| 2002 | 3 | "Suerte" | Shakira |
| 2002 | 4 | "Entra en Mi Vida" | Sin Bandera |
| 2002 | 5 | "A Dios le Pido" | Juanes |
| 2002 | 6 | "El Dolor de Tu Presencia" | Jennifer Peña |
| 2002 | 7 | "Usted Se Me Llevó la Vida" | Alexandre Pires |
| 2002 | 8 | "Tantita Pena" | Alejandro Fernández |
| 2002 | 9 | "Yo Puedo Hacer" | Ricardo Montaner |
| 2002 | 10 | "Yo Quería" | Cristian Castro |
| 2003 | 1 | "Tal Vez" ‡ | Ricky Martin |
| 2003 | 2 | "Fotografía" | Juanes featuring Nelly Furtado |
| 2003 | 3 | "Una Vez Más" | Conjunto Primavera |
| 2003 | 4 | "El Problema" | Ricardo Arjona |
| 2003 | 5 | "Amame" | Alexandre Pires |
| 2003 | 6 | "Mariposa Traicionera" | Maná |
| 2003 | 7 | "Así Es La Vida" | Olga Tañón |
| 2003 | 8 | "Que Me Quedes Tú" | Shakira |
| 2003 | 9 | "Sedúceme" | India |
| 2003 | 10 | "Sueña" | Intocable |
| 2004 | 1 | "Más Que Tu Amigo" ‡ | Marco Antonio Solís |
| 2004 | 2 | "Te Quise Tanto" | Paulina Rubio |
| 2004 | 3 | "Cuidarte el Alma" | Chayanne |
| 2004 | 4 | "Y Todo Queda en Nada" | Ricky Martin |
| 2004 | 5 | "Vivo y Muero en Tu Piel" | Jennifer Peña |
| 2004 | 6 | "Que de Raro Tiene" | Los Temerarios |
| 2004 | 7 | "Ahora Quién" | Marc Anthony |
| 2004 | 8 | "Tengo Ganas" | Victor Manuelle |
| 2004 | 9 | "Que Lloro" | Sin Bandera |
| 2004 | 10 | "Tú De Qué Vas" | Franco De Vita |
| 2005 | 1 | "La Tortura" ‡ | Shakira featuring Alejandro Sanz |
| 2005 | 2 | "La Camisa Negra" | Juanes |
| 2005 | 3 | "Hoy Como Ayer" | Conjunto Primavera |
| 2005 | 4 | "Lo Que Pasó, Pasó" | Daddy Yankee |
| 2005 | 5 | "Aire" | Intocable |
| 2005 | 6 | "Eres Divina" | Patrulla 81 |
| 2005 | 7 | "Por Qué es Tan Cruel el Amor" | Ricardo Arjona |
| 2005 | 8 | "Mayor Que Yo" | Luny Tunes featuring Baby Ranks, Daddy Yankee, Tonny Tun Tun, Wisin & Yandel and Hector "El Bambino" |
| 2005 | 9 | "Víveme" | Laura Pausini |
| 2005 | 10 | "Algo Más" | La 5ª Estación |
| 2006 | 1 | "Down" ‡ | R.K.M & Ken-Y |
| 2006 | 2 | "Hips Don't Lie" | Shakira featuring Wyclef Jean |
| 2006 | 3 | "Rompe" | Daddy Yankee |
| 2006 | 4 | "Aliado del Tiempo" | Mariano Barba |
| 2006 | 5 | "Llame Pa' Verte" | Wisin & Yandel |
| 2006 | 6 | "Caile" | Tito "El Bambino" |
| 2006 | 7 | "Machucando" | Daddy Yankee |
| 2006 | 8 | "Angelito" | Don Omar |
| 2006 | 9 | "Un Beso" | Aventura |
| 2006 | 10 | "Labios Compartidos" | Maná |
| 2007 | 1 | "Mi Corazoncito" ‡ | Aventura |
| 2007 | 2 | "Bendita Tu Luz" | Maná featuring Juan Luis Guerra |
| 2007 | 3 | "Tu Recuerdo" | Ricky Martin featuring La Mari and Tommy Torres |
| 2007 | 4 | "Dímelo" | Enrique Iglesias |
| 2007 | 5 | "Sola" | Hector "El Father" |
| 2007 | 6 | "¡Basta Ya!" | Conjunto Primavera |
| 2007 | 7 | "Igual Que Ayer" | R.K.M & Ken-Y |
| 2007 | 8 | "No Te Veo" | Casa de Leones |
| 2007 | 9 | "Pegao" | Wisin & Yandel featuring Los Vaqueros |
| 2007 | 10 | "De Tí Exclusivo" | La Arrolladora Banda El Limón |
| 2008 | 1 | "Te Quiero" ‡ | Flex |
| 2008 | 2 | "Si No Te Hubieras Ido" | Maná |
| 2008 | 3 | "Dónde Están Corazón" | Enrique Iglesias |
| 2008 | 4 | "Me Enamora" | Juanes |
| 2008 | 5 | "Hasta el Día de Hoy" | Los Dareyes de la Sierra |
| 2008 | 6 | "Para Siempre" | Vicente Fernández |
| 2008 | 7 | "No Me Doy Por Vencido" | Luis Fonsi |
| 2008 | 8 | "Gotas de Agua Dulce" | Juanes |
| 2008 | 9 | "Sobre Mis Pies" | La Arrolladora Banda El Limón |
| 2008 | 10 | "Estos Celos" | Vicente Fernández |
| 2009 | 1 | "Te Presumo" ‡ | Banda el Recodo |
| 2009 | 2 | "El Amor" | Tito "El Bambino" |
| 2009 | 3 | "Por Un Segundo" | Aventura |
| 2009 | 4 | "Ya Es Muy Tarde" | La Arrolladora Banda El Limón |
| 2009 | 5 | "No Me Doy Por Vencido" | Luis Fonsi |
| 2009 | 6 | "Lo Intentamos" | Espinoza Paz |
| 2009 | 7 | "Aquí Estoy Yo" | Luis Fonsi featuring David Bisbal, Aleks Syntek and Noel Schajris |
| 2009 | 8 | "Espero" | Grupo Montéz de Durango |
| 2009 | 9 | "Loba" | Shakira |
| 2009 | 10 | "Lloro Por Tí" | Enrique Iglesias |
| 2010 | 1 | "Cuando Me Enamoro" ‡ | Enrique Iglesias featuring Juan Luis Guerra |
| 2010 | 2 | "Al Menos" | La Original Banda el Limón |
| 2010 | 3 | "Dile al Amor" | Aventura |
| 2010 | 4 | "Dime Que Me Quieres" | Banda el Recodo |
| 2010 | 5 | "Niña Bonita" | Chino & Nacho |
| 2010 | 6 | "Ando Bien Pedo" | Banda Los Recoditos |
| 2010 | 7 | "Me Gusta Todo de Ti" | Banda el Recodo |
| 2010 | 8 | "Te Recordaré" | El Trono de Mexico |
| 2010 | 9 | "Te Pido Perdón" | Tito "El Bambino" |
| 2010 | 10 | "La Peinada" | Chuy Lizarraga y su Banda Tierra Sinaloense |
| 2011 | 1 | "Corazón Sin Cara" ‡ | Prince Royce |
| 2011 | 2 | "Taboo" | Don Omar |
| 2011 | 3 | "Me Encantaria" | Fidel Rueda |
| 2011 | 4 | "Danza Kuduro" | Don Omar featuring Lucenzo |
| 2011 | 5 | "Give Me Everything" | Pitbull featuring Ne-Yo, Afrojack, and Nayer |
| 2011 | 6 | "Te Amo y Te Amo" | La Adictiva Banda San Jose de Mesillas |
| 2011 | 7 | "Ni Lo Intentes" | Julion Alvarez y Su Norteno Banda |
| 2011 | 8 | "You" | Romeo Santos |
| 2011 | 9 | "Cuanto Me Cuesta" | La Arrolladora Banda El Limón |
| 2011 | 10 | "Ven a Bailar" | Jennifer Lopez featuring Pitbull |
| 2012 | 1 | "Llamada de Mi Ex" ‡ | La Arrolladora Banda El Limón |
| 2012 | 2 | "Dutty Love" | Don Omar featuring Natti Natasha |
| 2012 | 3 | "Inténtalo" | 3Ball MTY featuring El Bebeto and America Sierra |
| 2012 | 4 | "Bailando Por El Mundo" | Juan Magan featuring Pitbull and El Cata |
| 2012 | 5 | "Ai Se Eu Te Pego" | Michel Teló |
| 2012 | 6 | "Amor Confuso" | Gerardo Ortíz |
| 2012 | 7 | "Lovumba" | Daddy Yankee |
| 2012 | 8 | "Un Hombre Normal" | Espinoza Paz |
| 2012 | 9 | "El Verdadero Amor Perdona" | Maná featuring Prince Royce |
| 2012 | 10 | "Las Cosas Pequeñas" | Prince Royce |
| 2013 | 1 | "Vivir Mi Vida" ‡ | Marc Anthony |
| 2013 | 2 | "Limbo" | Daddy Yankee |
| 2013 | 3 | "Darte un Beso" | Prince Royce |
| 2013 | 4 | "Zumba" | Don Omar |
| 2013 | 5 | "Propuesta Indecente" | Romeo Santos |
| 2013 | 6 | "Algo Me Gusta de Ti" | Wisin & Yandel featuring Chris Brown and T-Pain |
| 2013 | 7 | "Llévame Contigo" | Romeo Santos |
| 2013 | 8 | "La Pregunta" | J Alvarez |
| 2013 | 9 | "Loco" | Enrique Iglesias featuring Romeo Santos |
| 2013 | 10 | "El Ruido de Tus Zapatos" | La Arrolladora Banda El Limón |
| 2014 | 1 | "Bailando" ‡ | Enrique Iglesias featuring Descemer Bueno and Gente de Zona |
| 2014 | 2 | "Propuesta Indecente" | Romeo Santos |
| 2014 | 3 | "Odio" | Romeo Santos featuring Drake |
| 2014 | 4 | "El Perdedor" | Enrique Iglesias featuring Marco Antonio Solís |
| 2014 | 5 | "Eres Mía" | Romeo Santos |
| 2014 | 6 | "Darte un Beso" | Prince Royce |
| 2014 | 7 | "6 AM" | J Balvin featuring Farruko |
| 2014 | 8 | "Vivir Mi Vida" | Marc Anthony |
| 2014 | 9 | "Adrenalina" | Wisin featuring Jennifer Lopez and Ricky Martin |
| 2014 | 10 | "Hermosa Experiencia" | Banda Sinaloense MS de Sergio Lizárraga |
| 2015 | 1 | "El Perdón" ‡ | Nicky Jam featuring Enrique Iglesias |
| 2015 | 2 | "Propuesta Indecente" | Romeo Santos |
| 2015 | 3 | "Hilito" | Romeo Santos |
| 2015 | 4 | "Ay Vamos" | J Balvin |
| 2015 | 5 | "Ginza" | J Balvin |
| 2015 | 6 | "Te Metiste" | Ariel Camacho y los Plebes del Rancho |
| 2015 | 7 | "La Gozadera" | Gente de Zona featuring Marc Anthony |
| 2015 | 8 | "Fanatica Sensual" | Plan B |
| 2015 | 9 | "Hablame de Ti" | Banda Sinaloense MS de Sergio Lizarraga |
| 2015 | 10 | "Bailando" | Enrique Iglesias featuring Descemer Bueno and Gente de Zona |
| 2016 | 1 | "Hasta el Amanecer" ‡ | Nicky Jam |
| 2016 | 2 | "Duele el Corazón" | Enrique Iglesias featuring Wisin |
| 2016 | 3 | "Ginza" | J Balvin |
| 2016 | 4 | "La Bicicleta" | Carlos Vives and Shakira |
| 2016 | 5 | "Solo Con Verte" | Banda Sinaloense MS de Sergio Lizarraga |
| 2016 | 6 | "Bobo" | J Balvin |
| 2016 | 7 | "El Perdedor" | Maluma featuring Yandel |
| 2016 | 8 | "Shaky Shaky" | Daddy Yankee |
| 2016 | 9 | "Encantadora" | Yandel |
| 2016 | 10 | "El Perdón" | Nicky Jam and Enrique Iglesias |
| 2017 | 1 | "Despacito" ‡ | Luis Fonsi & Daddy Yankee featuring Justin Bieber |
| 2017 | 2 | "Mi Gente" | J Balvin & Willy William featuring Beyoncé |
| 2017 | 3 | "Chantaje" | Shakira featuring Maluma |
| 2017 | 4 | "Felices los 4" | Maluma |
| 2017 | 5 | "Escápate Conmigo" | Wisin featuring Ozuna |
| 2017 | 6 | "El Amante" | Nicky Jam |
| 2017 | 7 | "Súbeme la Radio" | Enrique Iglesias featuring Descemer Bueno and Zion & Lennox |
| 2017 | 8 | "Reggaetón Lento (Bailemos)" | CNCO featuring Little Mix |
| 2017 | 9 | "Adiós Amor" | Christian Nodal |
| 2017 | 10 | "Ahora Dice" | Chris Jedi featuring Arcángel, J Balvin & Ozuna |
| 2018 | 1 | "Despacito" ‡ | Luis Fonsi & Daddy Yankee featuring Justin Bieber |
| 2018 | 2 | "Mi Gente" | J Balvin & Willy William featuring Beyoncé |
| 2018 | 3 | "Dura" | Daddy Yankee |
| 2018 | 4 | "X" | Nicky Jam and J Balvin |
| 2018 | 5 | "Te Boté" | Casper Mágico, Nio García, Darell, Nicky Jam, Ozuna, and Bad Bunny |
| 2018 | 6 | "El Farsante" | Ozuna and Romeo Santos |
| 2018 | 7 | "Échame la Culpa" | Luis Fonsi and Demi Lovato |
| 2018 | 8 | "La Modelo" | Ozuna and Cardi B |
| 2018 | 9 | "Sin Pijama" | Becky G and Natti Natasha |
| 2018 | 10 | "Me Niego" | Reik featuring Ozuna and Wisin |
| 2019 | 1 | "MIA" ‡ | Bad Bunny featuring Drake |
| 2019 | 2 | "Taki Taki" | DJ Snake featuring Selena Gomez, Ozuna and Cardi B |
| 2019 | 3 | "Con Calma" | Daddy Yankee & Katy Perry featuring Snow |
| 2019 | 4 | "Calma" | Pedro Capó and Farruko |
| 2019 | 5 | "Ella Quiere Beber" | Anuel AA, and Romeo Santos |
| 2019 | 6 | "Otro Trago" | Sech featuring Darell, Nicky Jam, Ozuna and Anuel AA |
| 2019 | 7 | "Callaíta" | Bad Bunny featuring Tainy |
| 2019 | 8 | "Soltera" | Lunay featuring Daddy Yankee and Bad Bunny |
| 2019 | 9 | "No Me Conoce" | Jhay Cortez featuring J Balvin and Bad Bunny |
| 2019 | 10 | "Te Boté" | Casper Magico, Nio García & Darell featuring Nicky Jam, Ozuna and Bad Bunny |
| 2020 | 1 | "Ritmo (Bad Boys for Life)" ‡ | The Black Eyed Peas and J Balvin |
| 2020 | 2 | "Tusa" | Karol G and Nicki Minaj |
| 2020 | 3 | "Vete" | Bad Bunny |
| 2020 | 4 | "Yo Perreo Sola" | Bad Bunny |
| 2020 | 5 | "Safaera" | Bad Bunny |
| 2020 | 6 | "La Difícil" | Bad Bunny |
| 2020 | 7 | "Sigues Con Él" | Arcángel and Sech |
| 2020 | 8 | "Mamacita" | Black Eyed Peas, Ozuna and J.Rey Soul |
| 2020 | 9 | "Si Veo a Tu Mamá" | Bad Bunny |
| 2020 | 10 | "La Jeepeta" | Nio Garcia, Anuel AA, Myke Towers, Brray and Juanka |
| 2021 | 1 | "Dakiti" ‡ | Bad Bunny and Jhay Cortez |
| 2021 | 2 | "Telepatía" | Kali Uchis |
| 2021 | 3 | "Hawái" | Maluma and The Weeknd |
| 2021 | 4 | "La Noche de Anoche" | Bad Bunny and Rosalía |
| 2021 | 5 | "Yonaguni" | Bad Bunny |
| 2021 | 6 | "Todo de Ti" | Rauw Alejandro |
| 2021 | 7 | "Pepas" | Farruko |
| 2021 | 8 | "Bichota" | Karol G |
| 2021 | 9 | "Fiel" | Los Legendarios, Wisin and Jhay Cortez |
| 2021 | 10 | "Bandido" | Myke Towers and Juhn |
| 2022 | 1 | "Me Porto Bonito" ‡ | Bad Bunny and Chencho Corleone |
| 2022 | 2 | "Tití Me Preguntó" | Bad Bunny |
| 2022 | 3 | "Moscow Mule" | Bad Bunny |
| 2022 | 4 | "Mamiii" | Becky G and Karol G |
| 2022 | 5 | "Provenza" | Karol G |
| 2022 | 6 | "Efecto" | Bad Bunny |
| 2022 | 7 | "Party" | Bad Bunny and Rauw Alejandro |
| 2022 | 8 | "Después de la Playa" | Bad Bunny |
| 2022 | 9 | "Pepas" | Farruko |
| 2022 | 10 | "Ojitos Lindos" | Bad Bunny and Bomba Estereo |
| 2023 | 1 | "Ella Baila Sola" ‡ | Eslabon Armado and Peso Pluma |
| 2023 | 2 | "La Bebé" | Yng Lvcas and Peso Pluma |
| 2023 | 3 | "Un x100to" | Grupo Frontera and Bad Bunny |
| 2023 | 4 | "TQG" | Karol G and Shakira |
| 2023 | 5 | "Bebe Dame" | Grupo Frontera and Fuerza Regida |
| 2023 | 6 | "Where She Goes" | Bad Bunny |
| 2023 | 7 | "Tití Me Preguntó" | Bad Bunny |
| 2023 | 8 | "PRC" | Peso Pluma and Natanael Cano |
| 2023 | 9 | "Por Las Noches" | Peso Pluma |
| 2023 | 10 | "Me Porto Bonito" | Bad Bunny |
| 2024 | 1 | "Gata Only" ‡ | FloyyMenor and Cris MJ |
| 2024 | 2 | "Perro Negro" | Bad Bunny and Feid |
| 2024 | 3 | "La Diabla" | Xavi |
| 2024 | 4 | "Monaco" | Bad Bunny |
| 2024 | 5 | "Qlona" | Karol G and Peso Pluma |
| 2024 | 6 | ''Harley Quinn" | Marshmello and Fuerza Regida |
| 2024 | 7 | "Si No Quieres No" | Luis R. Conriquez and Netón Vega |
| 2024 | 8 | "Si Antes Te Hubiera Conocido" | Karol G |
| 2024 | 9 | "Tú Name" | Fuerza Regida |
| 2024 | 10 | "La Víctima" | Xavi |
| 2025 | 1 | "DTMF" ‡ | Bad Bunny |
| 2025 | 2 | "Baile Inolvidable" | Bad Bunny |
| 2025 | 3 | "Nuevayol" | Bad Bunny |
| 2025 | 4 | "Eoo" | Bad Bunny |
| 2025 | 5 | "Me Jalo" | Fuerza Regida and Grupo Frontera |
| 2025 | 6 | "Tu Boda" | Óscar Maydon and Fuerza Regida |
| 2025 | 7 | "Loco" | Netón Vega |
| 2025 | 8 | "Que Pasaría…" | Rauw Alejandro and Bad Bunny |
| 2025 | 9 | "Voy A Llevarte Pa PR" | Bad Bunny |
| 2025 | 10 | "Por Esos Ojos" | Fuerza Regida |

Sources: 1987, 1988–1998, 1999, 2000, 2001, 2002, 2003, 2004, 2005, 2006, 2007, 2008, 2009, 2010, 2011, 2012, 2013, 2014, 2015, 2016, 2017, 2018, 2019, 2020, 2021, 2022, 2023, 2024, 2025

== See also ==
- Billboard Hot Latin Songs
- List of Billboard Hot Latin Songs chart achievements and milestones
- Billboard Hot 100
