= List of Billboard Hot Latin Songs number ones =

This is a list of number one songs on the Billboard Hot Latin Songs chart by year:

- List of number-one Billboard Top Latin Songs from the 1980s
- List of number-one Billboard Hot Latin Tracks of 1990
- List of number-one Billboard Hot Latin Tracks of 1991
- List of number-one Billboard Hot Latin Tracks of 1992
- List of number-one Billboard Hot Latin Tracks of 1993
- List of number-one Billboard Hot Latin Tracks of 1994
- List of number-one Billboard Hot Latin Tracks of 1995
- List of number-one Billboard Hot Latin Tracks of 1996
- List of number-one Billboard Hot Latin Tracks of 1997
- List of number-one Billboard Hot Latin Tracks of 1998
- List of number-one Billboard Hot Latin Tracks of 1999
- List of number-one Billboard Hot Latin Tracks of 2000
- List of number-one Billboard Hot Latin Tracks of 2001
- List of number-one Billboard Hot Latin Tracks of 2002
- List of number-one Billboard Hot Latin Tracks of 2003
- List of number-one Billboard Hot Latin Tracks of 2004
- List of number-one Billboard Hot Latin Songs of 2005
- List of number-one Billboard Hot Latin Songs of 2006
- List of number-one Billboard Hot Latin Songs of 2007
- List of number-one Billboard Hot Latin Songs of 2008
- List of number-one Billboard Hot Latin Songs of 2009
- List of number-one Billboard Top Latin Songs of 2010
- List of number-one Billboard Top Latin Songs of 2011
- List of number-one Billboard Top Latin Songs of 2012
- List of number-one Billboard Hot Latin Songs of 2013
- List of number-one Billboard Hot Latin Songs of 2014
- List of number-one Billboard Hot Latin Songs of 2015
- List of number-one Billboard Hot Latin Songs of 2016
- List of number-one Billboard Hot Latin Songs of 2017
- List of number-one Billboard Hot Latin Songs of 2018
- List of number-one Billboard Hot Latin Songs of 2019
- List of number-one Billboard Hot Latin Songs of 2020
- List of number-one Billboard Hot Latin Songs of 2021
