= Mi Deseo =

Single by Los Bukis

from the album A Través de Tus Ojos
- Released: February 11, 1991
- Recorded: 1990–1991
- Genre: Grupero ballad
- Length: 4:03
- Label: Fonovisa
- Songwriter: Marco Antonio Solís
- Producer: Marco Antonio Solís

Los Bukis singles chronology
"Me Dió Coraje" (1990)	"Mi Deseo" (1991)	"Dos" (1991)

"Mi Deseo" (English: My Wish) is a song by Mexican Grupero band Los Bukis. It was written and produced by the band's main songwriter and lead vocalist Marco Antonio Solís and was released by Fonovisa Records on February 11, 1991, as the lead single from the band's 13th studio album A Través de Tus Ojos (1991). The song became their third number-one single in the Billboard Top Latin Songs chart, after "Y Ahora Te Vas" and "Cómo Fui a Enamorarme de Ti".

The song debuted in the Billboard Top Latin Songs chart (formerly Hot Latin Tracks) chart at number 25 in the week of March 16, 1991, climbing to the top ten two weeks later. "Mi Deseo" peaked at number-one on May 11, 1991, replacing "No Basta" by Italo-Venezuelan singer-songwriter Franco De Vita and being succeeded six weeks later by "Todo, Todo, Todo" by Mexican singer-songwriter and actress Daniela Romo. "Mi Deseo" ended 1991 as the third best performing Latin single of the year in the United States and was nominated for Pop Song of the Year at the Lo Nuestro Awards of 1992.

== See also ==
- List of number-one Billboard Hot Latin Tracks of 1991
- Billboard Top Latin Songs Year-End Chart
