= List of Billboard Hot Latin Songs and Latin Airplay number ones of 2025 =

The Billboard Hot Latin Songs and Latin Airplay are charts that rank the best-performing Latin songs in the United States and are both published weekly by Billboard magazine. The Hot Latin Songs chart ranks the best-performing Spanish-language songs in the country based on digital downloads, streaming, and airplay from all radio stations. The Latin Airplay chart ranks the most-played songs on Spanish-language radio stations in the United States regardless of genre or language.

== Chart history ==
Chart history
Issue date	Hot Latin Songs			Latin Airplay		
Issue date	Title	Artist(s)	Ref.	Title	Artist(s)	Ref.
January 4	"Tu Boda"	Óscar Maydon and Fuerza Regida		"Soltera"	Shakira	
January 11	"Tu Boda"	Óscar Maydon and Fuerza Regida		"Si Antes te Hubiera Conocido"	Karol G	
January 18	"Nuevayol"	Bad Bunny		"Si Antes te Hubiera Conocido"	Karol G	
January 25	"DTMF"	Bad Bunny		"Si Antes te Hubiera Conocido"	Karol G	
February 1	"DTMF"	Bad Bunny		"Si Antes te Hubiera Conocido"	Karol G	
February 8	"DTMF"	Bad Bunny		"El Clúb"	Bad Bunny	
February 15	"DTMF"	Bad Bunny		"El Clúb"	Bad Bunny	
February 22	"DTMF"	Bad Bunny		"Otra Noche"	Myke Towers featuring Darell	
March 1	"DTMF"	Bad Bunny		"Baile Inolvidable"	Bad Bunny	
March 8	"DTMF"	Bad Bunny		"Baile Inolvidable"	Bad Bunny	
March 15	"DTMF"	Bad Bunny		"Doblexxó"	J Balvin and Feid	
March 22	"DTMF"	Bad Bunny		"El Amor de Mi Herida"	Carín León	
March 29	"DTMF"	Bad Bunny		"Khé?"	Rauw Alejandro and Romeo Santos	
April 5	"DTMF"	Bad Bunny		"Me Jalo"	Fuerza Regida and Grupo Frontera	
April 12	"DTMF"	Bad Bunny		"Háblame Claro"	Yandel and Feid	
April 19	"DTMF"	Bad Bunny		"Más Que Tú"	Ozuna and Kapo	
April 26	"DTMF"	Bad Bunny		"Imagínate"	Danny Ocean and Kapo	
May 3	"DTMF"	Bad Bunny		"Degenere"	Myke Towers featuring Benny Blanco	
May 10	"DTMF"	Bad Bunny		"Raíces"	Gloria Estefan	
May 17	"DTMF"	Bad Bunny		"No Se Dice"	Gerardo Coronel 'El Jerry'	
May 24	"DTMF"	Bad Bunny		"Ahí Estabas Tú"	Carín León	
May 31	"DTMF"	Bad Bunny		"DTMF"	Bad Bunny	
June 7	"DTMF"	Bad Bunny		"En Privado"	Xavi and Manuel Turizo	
June 14	"DTMF"	Bad Bunny		"Vestido Rojo"	Silvestre Dangond and Emilia	
June 21	"DTMF"	Bad Bunny		"Desde Hoy"	Natti Natasha	
June 28	"DTMF"	Bad Bunny		"How Deep Is Your Love"	Prince Royce	
July 5	"DTMF"	Bad Bunny		"La Pelirroja"	Sebastián Yatra	
July 12	"DTMF"	Bad Bunny		"Rio"	J Balvin	
July 19	"DTMF"	Bad Bunny		"Carita Linda"	Rauw Alejandro	
July 26	"DTMF"	Bad Bunny		"Latina Foreva"	Karol G	
August 2	"DTMF"	Bad Bunny		"Me Toca a Mí"	Morat with Camilo	
August 9	"DTMF"	Bad Bunny		"Soleao"	Myke Towers and Quevedo	
August 16	"DTMF"	Bad Bunny		"Eoo"	Bad Bunny	
August 23	"DTMF"	Bad Bunny		"Eoo"	Bad Bunny	
August 30	"Marlboro Rojo"	Fuerza Regida		"Ojos Tristes"	Selena Gomez, Benny Blanco and The Marías	
September 6	"Marlboro Rojo"	Fuerza Regida		"Luna"	Kapo and Wisin	
September 13	"Marlboro Rojo"	Fuerza Regida		"Vivir Sin Aire"	Maná and Carín León	
September 20	"Marlboro Rojo"	Fuerza Regida		"Me Está Doliendo"	Carín León and Alejandro Fernández	
September 27	"Marlboro Rojo"	Fuerza Regida		"La Vecina (No Sé Na')"	Gloria Estefan	
October 4	"DTMF"	Bad Bunny		"Bronceador"	Maluma	
October 11	"DTMF"	Bad Bunny		"Sirenita"	Ozuna	
October 18	"DTMF"	Bad Bunny		"Noventa"	DJ Snake and J Balvin	
October 25	"DTMF"	Bad Bunny		"Sonríele"	DY	
November 1	"DTMF"	Bad Bunny		"Nuevayol"	Bad Bunny	
November 8	"DTMF"	Bad Bunny		"Pórtate Bonito"	Anuel AA and Blessd	
November 15	"DTMF"	Bad Bunny		"Tengo Celos"	Myke Towers	
November 22	"DTMF"	Bad Bunny		"Difícile"	Venesti and Mike Bahía	
November 29	"Marlboro Rojo"	Fuerza Regida		"Verano Rosa"	Karol G and Feid	
December 6	"Marlboro Rojo"	Fuerza Regida		"I Want It That Way"	Prince Royce	
December 13	"Marlboro Rojo"	Fuerza Regida		"Que Me Quiera Má"	Marc Anthony and Wisin	
December 20	"DTMF"	Bad Bunny		"Se Lo Juro Mor"	Feid	
December 27	"DTMF"	Bad Bunny		"Lokita Por Mí"	Romeo Santos and Prince Royce	

== Hot Latin Songs weeks at number one ==
=== Songs ===
Number of weeks	Song	Artist(s)
41	"DTMF"	Bad Bunny
8	"Marlboro Rojo"	Fuerza Regida
2	"Tu Boda"	Óscar Maydon and Fuerza Regida
1	"Nuevayol"	Bad Bunny

=== Artists ===
Number of weeks	Artist	Number of songs
42	Bad Bunny	2
10	Fuerza Regida	2
2	Óscar Maydon	1

== See also ==
- 2025 in Latin music
- List of artists who reached number one on the U.S. Latin Songs chart
- List of number-one Billboard Latin Albums from the 2020s
