= List of number-one Billboard Hot Latin Tracks of 2001 =

This is a list containing the Billboard Hot Latin Tracks number-ones of 2001.

Issue date	Song	Artist(s)	Ref.
January 6	"Yo Te Amo"	Chayanne	
January 13	"Te Quise Olvidar"	MDO	
January 20	"Te Quise Olvidar"	MDO	
January 27	"Abrázame Muy Fuerte"	Juan Gabriel	
February 3	"Abrázame Muy Fuerte"	Juan Gabriel	
February 10	"Abrázame Muy Fuerte"	Juan Gabriel	
February 17	"Te Quise Olvidar"	MDO	
February 24	"Abrázame Muy Fuerte"	Juan Gabriel	
March 3	"Abrázame Muy Fuerte"	Juan Gabriel	
March 10	"Abrázame Muy Fuerte"	Juan Gabriel	
March 17	"Abrázame Muy Fuerte"	Juan Gabriel	
March 24	"Abrázame Muy Fuerte"	Juan Gabriel	
March 31	"Abrázame Muy Fuerte"	Juan Gabriel	
April 7	"Sólo Quiero Amarte"	Ricky Martin	
April 14	"Sólo Quiero Amarte"	Ricky Martin	
April 21	"Sólo Quiero Amarte"	Ricky Martin	
April 28	"Sólo Quiero Amarte"	Ricky Martin	
May 5	"Quiero"	Jerry Rivera	
May 12	"Quiero"	Jerry Rivera	
May 19	"Quiero"	Jerry Rivera	
May 26	"Quiero"	Jerry Rivera	
June 2	"Quiero"	Jerry Rivera	
June 9	"La Bomba"	Azul Azul	
June 16	"La Bomba"	Azul Azul	
June 23	"La Bomba"	Azul Azul	
June 30	"Azul"	Cristian Castro	
July 7	"Azul"	Cristian Castro	
July 14	"Azul"	Cristian Castro	
July 21	"Azul"	Cristian Castro	
July 28	"Azul"	Cristian Castro	
August 4	"Azul"	Cristian Castro	
August 11	"Azul"	Cristian Castro	
August 18	"Azul"	Cristian Castro	
August 25	"Azul"	Cristian Castro	
September 1	"Cómo Se Cura Una Herida"	Jaci Velásquez	
September 8	"Cómo Se Cura Una Herida"	Jaci Velásquez	
September 15	"Cómo Se Cura Una Herida"	Jaci Velásquez	
September 22	"Cómo Olvidar"	Olga Tañón	
September 29	"O Me Voy O Te Vas"	Marco Antonio Solís	
October 6	"Suerte"	Shakira	
October 13	"Suerte"	Shakira	
October 20	"Suerte"	Shakira	
October 27	"Suerte"	Shakira	
November 3	"Suerte"	Shakira	
November 10	"Héroe"	Enrique Iglesias	
November 17	"Suerte"	Shakira	
November 24	"Déjame Entrar"	Carlos Vives	
December 1	"Tantita Pena"	Alejandro Fernández	
December 8	"Tantita Pena"	Alejandro Fernández	
December 15	"Déjame Entrar"	Carlos Vives	
December 22	"Déjame Entrar"	Carlos Vives	
December 29	"Tantita Pena"	Alejandro Fernandez	

== See also ==
- Hot Latin Tracks
