= List of artists who reached number one on the U.S. Latin Songs chart =

This is a list of recording artists who have reached number one on Billboard magazine's Hot Latin Songs chart. Billboard established the Hot Latin Songs as an airplay-only chart which measured a song's ranking on Spanish-language radio stations in the United States. Several songs which were not sung in Spanish have topped the chart. Beginning on October 11, 2012, the methodology for the Hot Latin Songs chart includes sales of digital downloads and streaming activity in addition to airplay while non Spanish-language songs are now excluded from ranking on the chart.

- All acts are listed alphabetically.
- Solo artists are alphabetized by last name or their pseudonymous surnames, unless they do not include a recognizable surname in the pseudonym; groups are listed by name, excluding "A," "An", "The", "Los", "Las", "El", "La", "Un".
- Each act's total of number one U.S. Latin Songs is shown after their name.
- All artists who are mentioned in song credits are listed here; this includes one-time pairings of otherwise solo artists and those appearing as "featured".
- Members of groups who reached number one are not listed here separately from their groups, unless they also hit number one as a solo artist.
- Do not include artists who have yet to have a song reach number one on the Hot Latin Songs but have done so on its component and subgenre charts (e.g. Latin Digital and Latin Pop Airplay)

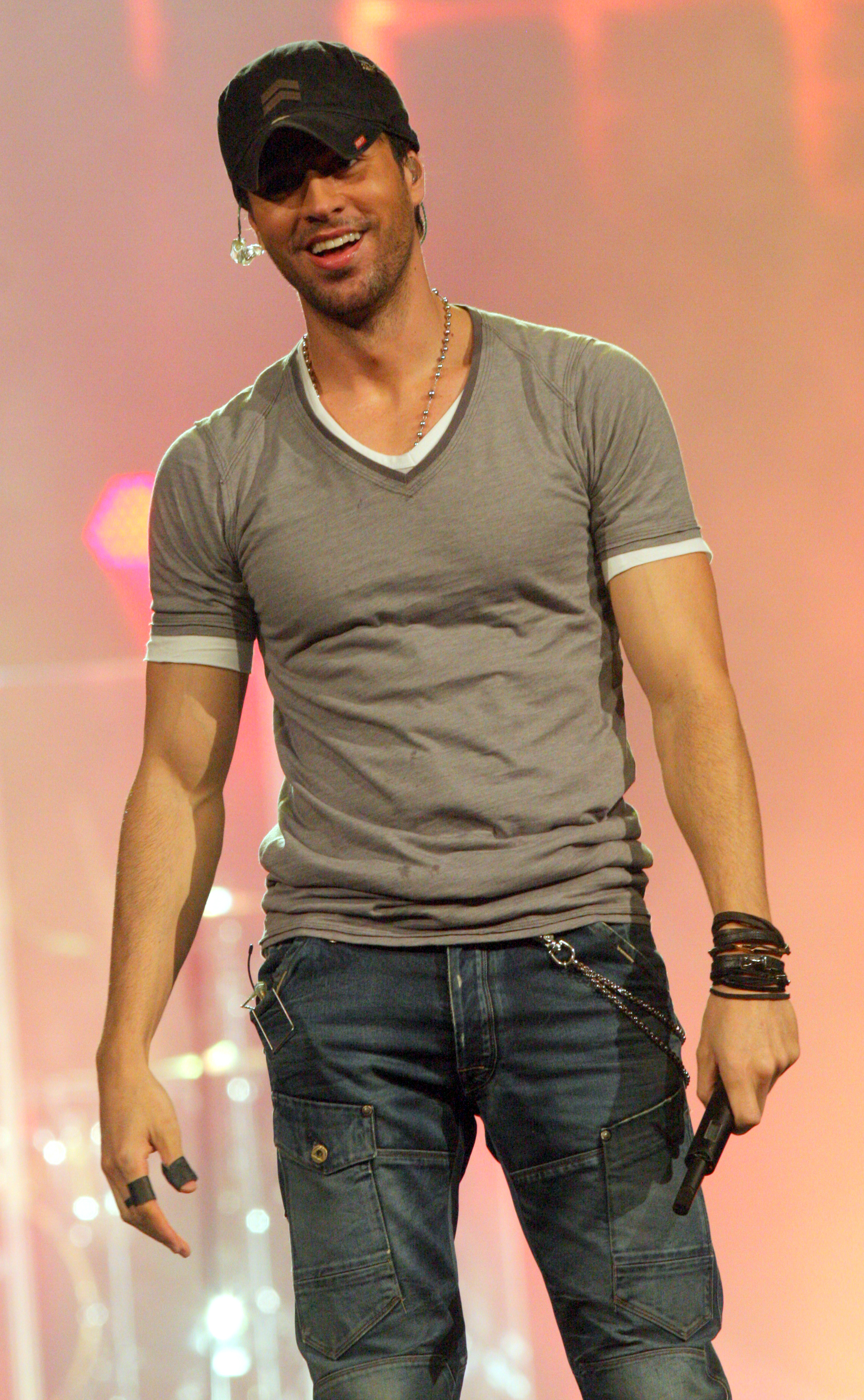
Enrique Iglesias has scored 27 number ones, holding the record for most number ones.

== 0–9 ==
- 3Ball MTY (1)
- 4.40 (see Juan Luis Guerra)
- 6ix9ine (1)

== A ==
- Anuel AA (3)
- Afrojack (1)
- Christina Aguilera (1)
- Azul Azul (1)
- Anaís (1)
- Andy & Lucas (1)
- Marc Anthony (8)
- Ricardo Arjona (5)
- La Arrolladora Banda El Limón (1)
- Aventura (3)
- Azul Azul (1)

== B ==
- Cardi B (1)
- J Balvin (9)
- Bad Bunny (17)
- Gabito Ballesteros (1)
- Banda Blanca (1)
- Banda el Recodo (2)
- Banda Los Recoditos (1)
- Barrio Boyzz (2)
- El Bebeto (1)
- Obie Bermúdez (3)
- Beyoncé (1)
- Justin Bieber (1)
- David Bisbal (3)
- Bizarrap (1)
- The Black Eyed Peas (2)
- Braulio (1)
- Bronco (1)
- Chris Brown (1)
- Descemer Bueno (1)
- Los Bukis (4)

== C ==
- Ariel Camacho (1)
- Roberto Carlos (3)
- Vikki Carr (1)
- Ángela Carrasco (1)
- Chencho Corleone (1)
- Cristian Castro (6)
- El Cata (2)
- Chino & Nacho (2)
- Chayanne (9)
- El Chombo (1)
- Conjunto Primavera (4)
- Jhay Cortez (1)
- Elvis Crespo (3)

== D ==
- Darell (1)
- Oscar De La Hoya (1)
- Franco De Vita (1)
- Celine Dion (1)
- DJ Nesty (1)
- DJ Snake (1)
- Drake (4)
- Rocío Dúrcal (4)

== E ==
- Emmanuel (3)
- Eslabon Armado (1)
- Gloria Estefan (15)

== F ==
- Los Fantasmas del Caribe (2)
- Farruko (1)
- Fuerza Regida (3)
- José Feliciano (1)
- Alejandro Fernández (8)
- Vicente Fernández (1)
- Flex (1)
- FloyyMenor (1)
- Luis Fonsi (7)
- Franco (2)
- Franco De Vita (1)
- Grupo Frontera (1)
- Nelly Furtado (2)

== G ==
- Becky G (1)
- Karol G (11)
- Ana Gabriel (6)
- Juan Gabriel (7)
- Nio Garcia (1)
- Gente de Zona (1)
- Gipsy Kings (1)
- Gisselle (1)
- Selena Gomez (1)
- Juan Luis Guerra (7)

== H ==
- Junior H (1)
- Héctor el Father (1)
- Myriam Hernández (2)

== I ==
- Enrique Iglesias (27)
- Julio Iglesias (3)
- Ilegales (1)
- La India (1)
- Intocable (1)

== J ==
- Nicky Jam (3)
- Wyclef Jean (1)
- Natalia Jiménez (1)
- José José (4)
- José & Durval (1)
- Juanes (8)
- Judeline (1)

== K ==
- Kaoma (1)
- Las Ketchup (1)
- Alicia Keys (1)

== L ==
- Rudy La Scala (2)
- Dua Lipa (1)
- Los Lobos (1)
- Jennifer Lopez (3)
- Fanny Lú (2)
- Lucenzo (1)

== M ==
- La Mafia (4)
- Casper Mágico (1)
- Makano (1)
- La Mari (1)
- Maluma (2)
- Maná (10)
- Víctor Manuelle (2)
- Marisela (1)
- Ricky Martin (11)
- Óscar Maydon (1)
- MDO (2)
- Luis Miguel (16)
- Millie (1)
- Nicki Minaj (1)
- Cris MJ (1)
- Ricardo Montaner (4)
- Pilar Montenegro (1)

== N ==
- Natti Natasha (1)
- Nayer (1)
- Ne-Yo (1)

== O ==
- Onda Vaselina (1)
- Don Omar (5)
- Ozuna (5)

== P ==
- Pandora (1)
- Jennifer Peña (2)
- Katy Perry (1)
- Los Plebes del Rancho (see Ariel Camacho)
- Pimpinela (1)
- Pitbull (3)
- Peso Pluma (4)
- Carlos Ponce (3)
- Prince Royce (4)

== R ==
- RBD (1)
- R.K.M & Ken-Y (1)
- Los Rehenes (1)
- Los Rieleros del Norte (1)
- Jerry Rivera (2)
- Lourdes Robles (1)
- José Luis Rodríguez (3)
- Daniela Romo (3)
- Gilberto Santa Rosa (1)
- Paulina Rubio (5)
- Rusowsky (1)

== S ==
- Romeo Santos (7)
- Alejandro Sanz (5)
- Noel Schajris (1)
- Jay Sean (1)
- Jon Secada (5)
- Sech (1)
- Selena (7)
- Camilo Sesto (1)
- Shakira (13)
- América Sierra (1)
- Snow (1)
- Marco Antonio Solís (11)
- Son by Four (2)
- Soraya (1)
- J. Rey Soul (1)
- Aleks Syntek (1)

== T ==
- Tainy (1)
- T-Pain (1)
- Olga Tañón (3)
- Michel Teló (1)
- Los Temerarios (4)
- Thalía (4)
- Los Tigres del Norte (2)
- Tito El Bambino (3)
- Tomatito (1)
- Álvaro Torres (2)
- Diego Torres (1)
- Tommy Torres (1)

== U ==
- Kali Uchis (2)
- Usher (1)

== V ==
- Jaci Velasquez (2)
- Carlos Vives (5)

== W ==
- Willy William (1)
- Wisin & Yandel (11)
- Wisin (1)

== X ==
- Xavi (1)

== Y ==
- Yahritza y Su Esencia (1)
- Daddy Yankee (6)
- Yuri (3)

== Z ==
- Charlie Zaa (1)

=== References ===
- Additional information can be found within Billboard's online archive services and print editions of the magazine.
