= List of Billboard Hot Latin Songs and Latin Airplay number ones of 2021 =

The Billboard Hot Latin Songs and Latin Airplay are charts that rank the best-performing Latin songs in the United States and are both published weekly by Billboard magazine. The Hot Latin Songs chart ranks the best-performing Spanish-language songs in the country based on digital downloads, streaming, and airplay from all radio stations. The Latin Airplay chart ranks the most-played songs on Spanish-language radio stations in the United States regardless of genre or language.

== Chart history ==
Chart history
Issue date	Hot Latin Songs			Latin Airplay		
Issue date	Title	Artist(s)	Ref.	Title	Artist(s)	Ref.
January 2	"Dakiti"	Bad Bunny and Jhay Cortez		"Hawái"	Maluma	
January 9	"Dakiti"	Bad Bunny and Jhay Cortez		"Dakiti"	Bad Bunny and Jhay Cortez	
January 16	"Dakiti"	Bad Bunny and Jhay Cortez		"Mi Niña"	Los Legendarios, Wisin and Myke Towers	
January 23	"Dakiti"	Bad Bunny and Jhay Cortez		"La Nota"	Manuel Turizo, Myke Towers and Rauw Alejandro	
January 30	"Dakiti"	Bad Bunny and Jhay Cortez		"Vida de Rico"	Camilo	
February 6	"Dakiti"	Bad Bunny and Jhay Cortez		"Despeinada"	Ozuna and Camilo	
February 13	"Dakiti"	Bad Bunny and Jhay Cortez		"Bichota"	Karol G	
February 20	"Dakiti"	Bad Bunny and Jhay Cortez		"Chica Ideal"	Sebastián Yatra and Guaynaa	
February 27	"Dakiti"	Bad Bunny and Jhay Cortez		"De Vuelta Pa' La Vuelta"	Daddy Yankee and Marc Anthony	
March 6	"Dakiti"	Bad Bunny and Jhay Cortez		"Travesuras"	Nio Garcia and Casper Magico	
March 13	"Dakiti"	Bad Bunny and Jhay Cortez		"Girl Like Me"	Black Eyed Peas and Shakira	
March 20	"Dakiti"	Bad Bunny and Jhay Cortez		"Un Amor Eterno"	Marc Anthony	
March 27	"Dakiti"	Bad Bunny and Jhay Cortez		"Baila Conmigo"	Selena Gomez with Rauw Alejandro	
April 3	"Dakiti"	Bad Bunny and Jhay Cortez		"Tu Veneno"	J Balvin	
April 10	"Dakiti"	Bad Bunny and Jhay Cortez		"Location"	Karol G, Anuel AA and J Balvin	
April 17	"Dakiti"	Bad Bunny and Jhay Cortez		"Antes Que Salga El Sol"	Natti Natasha and Prince Royce	
April 24	"Dakiti"	Bad Bunny and Jhay Cortez		"La Noche de Anoche"	Bad Bunny and Rosalía	
May 1	"Dakiti"	Bad Bunny and Jhay Cortez		"Fan de Tus Fotos"	Nicky Jam and Romeo Santos	
May 8	"Dakiti"	Bad Bunny and Jhay Cortez		"La Noche de Anoche"	Bad Bunny and Rosalía	
May 15	"Dakiti"	Bad Bunny and Jhay Cortez		"#Problema"	Daddy Yankee	
May 22	"Telepatía"	Kali Uchis		"#Problema"	Daddy Yankee	
May 29	"Telepatía"	Kali Uchis		"Vacio"	Luis Fonsi & Rauw Alejandro	
June 5	"Telepatía"	Kali Uchis		"El Makinón"	Karol G & Mariah Angeliq	
June 12	"Telepatía"	Kali Uchis		"Fiel"	Los Legendarios, Wisin & Jhay Cortez	
June 19	"Yonaguni"	Bad Bunny		"Bandido"	Myke Towers & Juhn	
June 26	"Yonaguni"	Bad Bunny		"Tiempo"	Ozuna	
July 3	"Yonaguni"	Bad Bunny		"Telepatía"	Kali Uchis	
July 10	"Yonaguni"	Bad Bunny		"Otra Noche Sin Ti"	J Balvin and Khalid	
July 17	"Yonaguni"	Bad Bunny		"Ram Pam Pam"	Natti Natasha and Becky G	
July 24	"Telepatía"	Kali Uchis		"Millones"	Camilo	
July 31	"Telepatía"	Kali Uchis		"Todo de Ti"	Rauw Alejandro	
August 7	"Telepatía"	Kali Uchis		"Viendo El Techo"	Jay Wheeler	
August 14	"Telepatía"	Kali Uchis		"Pareja del Año"	Sebastián Yatra and Myke Towers	
August 21	"Volví"	Aventura and Bad Bunny		"Todo de Ti"	Rauw Alejandro	
August 28	"Pepas"	Farruko		"Loco"	Justin Quiles, Chimbala, Zion & Lennox	
September 4	"Pepas"	Farruko		"Yonaguni"	Bad Bunny	
September 11	"Pepas"	Farruko		"In da Getto"	J Balvin and Skrillex	
September 18	"Pepas"	Farruko		"Deja Vu"	Tainy and Yandel	
September 25	"Pepas"	Farruko		"La Funka"	Ozuna	
October 2	"Pepas"	Farruko		"Me Pasé"	Enrique Iglesias featuring Farruko	
October 9	"Pepas"	Farruko		"Pepas"	Farruko	
October 16	"Pepas"	Farruko		"Noches En Miami"	Natti Nattasha	
October 23	"Pepas"	Farruko		"Volví"	Aventura and Bad Bunny	
October 30	"Pepas"	Farruko		"Lao' a Lao'"	Prince Royce	
November 6	"Pepas"	Farruko		"Sobrio"	Maluma	
November 13	"Pepas"	Farruko		"Pepas"	Farruko	
November 20	"Pepas"	Farruko		"Pepas"	Farruko	
November 27	"Pepas"	Farruko		"Bésame"	Luis Fonsi and Myke Towers	
December 4	"Pepas"	Farruko		"Dos Tragos"	Jay Wheeler	
December 11	"Pepas"	Farruko		"Sal y Perrea"	Sech, Daddy Yankee and J Balvin	
December 18	"Pepas"	Farruko		"Pepas"	Farruko	
December 25	"Pepas"	Farruko		"Todo de Ti"	Rauw Alejandro	

== Hot Latin Songs weeks at number one ==
=== Songs ===
Number of weeks	Song	Artist(s)
20	"Dakiti"	Bad Bunny and Jhay Cortez
18	"Pepas"	Farruko
8	"Telepatía"	Kali Uchis
5	"Yonaguni"	Bad Bunny
1	"Volví"	Aventura and Bad Bunny

=== Artists ===
Number of weeks	Artist	Number of songs
26	Bad Bunny	3
20	Jhay Cortez	1
18	Farruko	1
8	Kali Uchis	1
1	Aventura	1

== See also ==
- 2021 in Latin music
- List of artists who reached number one on the U.S. Latin Songs chart
- List of number-one Billboard Latin Albums from the 2020s
