= Andy & Lucas =

Spanish pop music duo

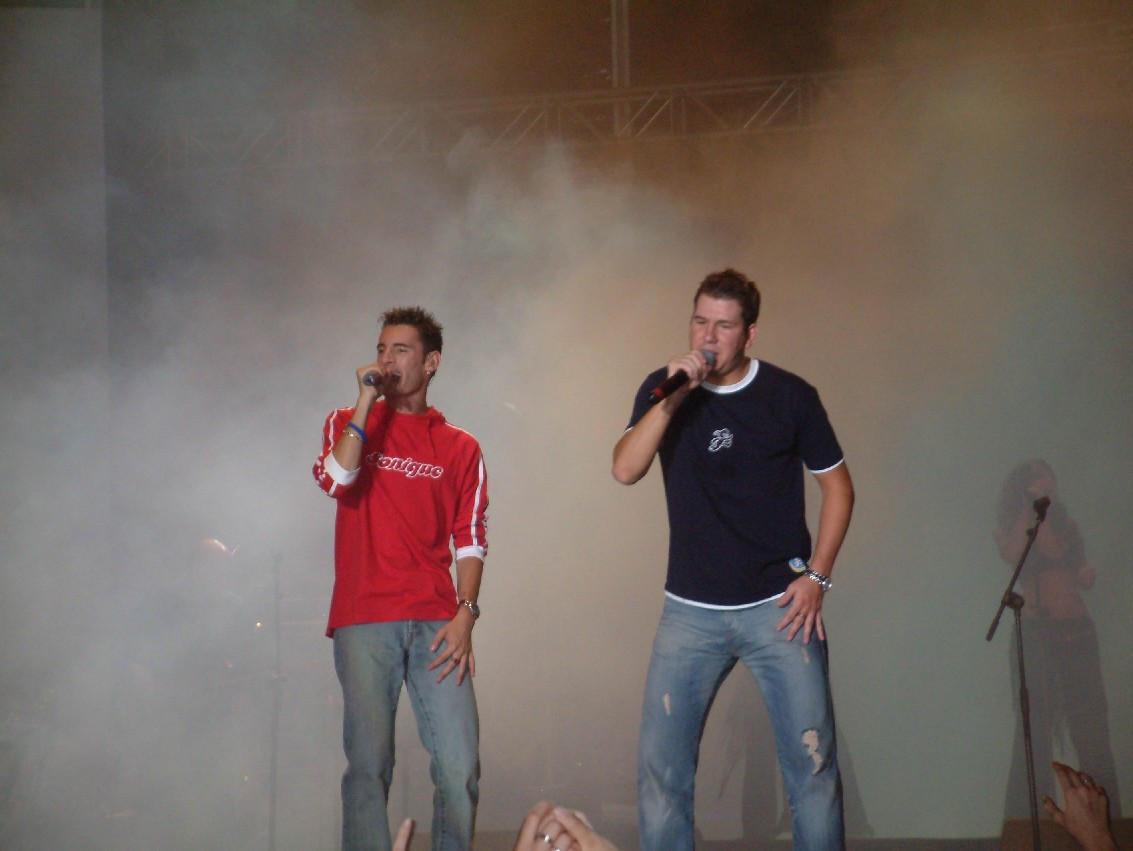
- Concert in Santa Cruz de La Palma

Background information
- Origin: Cádiz, Spain
- Genres: Pop, flamenco
- Years active: 1999–2025
- Label: Sony BMG
- Members: Andrés Morales Lucas González
- Website: andyylucas.com

Andy & Lucas was a Spanish Flamenco-inspired pop duo originally from the province of Cádiz in Spain. The band consists of Andrés Morales and Lucas González, who first knew each other as neighbours and friends in their Cádiz neighborhood of La Laguna.

== History ==
The boys went to school together from the first grade on, deciding to form a musical group early on in their friendship. At the age of 12, Morales began writing songs, which he began to perform with González in bars around Cadiz by the time they were 16. The duo made their recording industry debut four years later with the release of Andy & Lucas, produced by the Argentine-born Alejo Stivel. The disc went on to sell more than 200,000 units, topping the national charts for a number of weeks. The second single of their first album, titled "Son de Amores" peaked at number-one in the Billboard Hot Latin Tracks, on September 18, 2004.

The production of a live in-concert (Barcelona) DVD, entitled Viviendo un Sueno (Living a Dream), saw Morales and González win their first major award, a Premio Onda for Best New Artist. Another song, Ganas de Vivir landed a spot on Billboard's European Top 100. Ganas de vivir has been certified as Platinum. Andy y Lucas have sold more than 1 mill. Their album Desde Mi Barrio received a nomination for a Latin Grammy Award for Best Pop Album by a Duo or Group with Vocals.

Con Los Pies en la Tierra is the fourth album by the Cadiz duo. Containing twelve new songs, it went on sale on September 30, 2008. "Tu que quieres que yo le haga" was the first single, which appeared in 2008, and was certified Platinum by Promusicae for digital downloads and ringtone sales. It was followed by "tus miradas" in 2009".

In November 2023, after more than 20 years together, the duo announced that they were separating due to Lucas' health problems. Apparently the singer suffers from cardiovascular problems and although he has explained that “with the pill I am quite stable”, the doctor has recommended slowing down.

Their last concert was at the Palacio Vistalegre (Madrid) on October 10, 2025, and a day after this concert Andy confirmed, through a statement, the start of his solo career.

== Discography ==
Albums:

- Andy & Lucas (2003)
- Andy & Lucas Ed. Especial (2003)
- En su salsa (2004)
- Desde mi barrio (2004) No. 2 SP
- ¿Qué no? ¡Anda que no! (2005) No. 25 SP
- Ganas de vivir (2007) No.1 SP
- Con los pies en la tierra (2008) No.1 SP
- Pido la palabra (2010) No.3 SP (Gold)
- El ritmo de las olas (2012) No.1 SP
- Mas de 10 (2014) No .2 SP
- Imparable (2016)
- Nueva Vida (2018)

Singles:

- 2003 "Son de amores" - No. 1 (Lista 40), No. 1 (Billboard)
- 2003 "Tanto la quería" - No. 1 (Lista 40)
- 2004 "Y en tu ventana" - No. 1 (Lista 40)
- 2004 "Hasta los huesos" - No. 6 (Lista 40)
- 2004 "Mírame a la cara" - No. 23 (Lista 40)
- 2004 "Como caído del cielo" - No. 3 (Lista 40)
- 2005 "Quiero ser tu sueño" - No. 9 (Lista 40)
- 2005 "Yo lo que quiero" - No. 25 (Lista 40)
- 2005 "Mi barrio" - No. 21 (Lista 40)
- 2007 "Quiéreme" - No. 1 (Promusicae)
- 2007 "Quiero que sepas"
- 2007 "De qué me vale"
- 2008 "Tú que quieres que yo le haga" - No. 4 (Promusicae)
- 2008 "Tus miradas"
- 2010 "Aqui sigo yo" - No. 15 (Promusicae)
- 2011 "Pido la palabra" (feat. Diana Navarro)
- 2011 "Faldas"
- 2012 "El ritmo de las olas"
- 2013 "Echándote De Menos"
- 2014 "Silencio"
- 2014 "Si unas palabras bastan"
- 2015 "Besos"
- 2016 "El Último Beso"
- 2016 "Tú háblale"
- 2017 "Quiero la Playa"
- 2018 "Para Que Bailes Conmigo"
- 2018 "La Ultima Opportunidad"
- 2018 "Nueva Vida"

== Personal lives ==
Andy has a daughter and a son from two different relationships, while Lucas has a son. In both cases, the son is named after his father. Lucas's father, Pedrito González, was a professional footballer, spending most of his career at Celta Vigo.

== See also ==
- Number-one hits of 2004 (U.S. Hot Latin Tracks)
