= Yonaguni (song) =

2021 song by Bad Bunny

Single by Bad Bunny
- Language: Spanish; Japanese
- Released: June 4, 2021
- Genre: Reggaeton; alternative reggaeton
- Length: 3:26
- Label: Rimas
- Songwriter: Benito Martínez
- Producers: Byrd; FinesseGTB; Smash David; Tainy

Bad Bunny singles chronology
"100 Millones" (2021)	"Yonaguni" (2021)	"AM (Remix)" (2021)

Music video
- "Yonaguni" on YouTube

"Yonaguni" is a song by Puerto Rican rapper and singer Bad Bunny. It was released on June 4, 2021, through Rimas Entertainment, along with the music video. The song's title refers to Yonaguni Island in Japan, with Bad Bunny performing in Spanish and Japanese. The song topped the Billboard's Hot Latin Songs chart and reached number 3 on the Billboard Global 200.

== Composition ==
"Yonaguni" is a reggaeton and alternative reggaeton song. Billboard's Jessica Ruiz noted Bad Bunny returned to his "vulnerable and emo lyrics" for the "chill" reggaeton song, different from his "newfound alternative perreo sound" of his previous studio albums. In the song, Bad Bunny tells his love interest that he will travel to Yonaguni for her if she wants and names a list of things that he is willing to do to get back with her, putting aside the guy she is currently dating. The track features reggaeton beats, vocal melodies, and a Japanese-language outro.

== Music video ==
Bad Bunny released the music video along with the song. Directed by Stillz, it follows the rapper throughout the day, as he tries to forget a love interest. Seeking distractions, the protagonist is seen dining alone at a sushi restaurant, walking dogs, practicing martial arts and yoga, getting a Pokémon Go tattoo, and going to a party. As of February 2026, the music video has received over 1 billion views.

== Commercial performance ==
The song reached number 3 on the Billboard Global 200 and number 4 on the Global Excl. US chart. Commenting on that, Billboard's Eric Frankenberg noticed is unusual for Spanish-language music to perform better on the Global 200 than the Global Excl. US chart. In the United States, it debuted at number 10 on the Billboard Hot 100, the highest Latin-music debut of 2021, becoming his fourth top 10 entry and first with no accompanying acts. It became his eighth number-one on the US Hot Latin Songs chart, and record-breaking 40th top 10 single, thus breaking a tie with Enrique Iglesias and Luis Miguel, each with 39 top 10s.

== Charts ==
=== Weekly charts ===
Chart performance for "Yonaguni"
Chart (2021–2022)	Peak position
Argentina Hot 100 (Billboard)	5
Bolivia (Billboard)	7
Canada Hot 100 (Billboard)	72
Chile (Billboard)	8
Colombia (Billboard)	9
Colombia (National-Report)	5
Costa Rica (Monitor Latino)	16
Dominican Republic (Monitor Latino)	3
Ecuador (Billboard)	5
Global 200 (Billboard)	3
Guatemala (Monitor Latino)	14
Honduras (Monitor Latino)	3
Italy (FIMI)	95
Mexico (Billboard)	2
Mexico (Billboard Espanol Airplay)	19
Mexico Streaming (AMPROFON)	2
New Zealand Hot Singles (RMNZ)	21
Nicaragua (Monitor Latino)	6
Panama (Monitor Latino)	15
Paraguay (Monitor Latino)	11
Peru (Billboard)	5
Portugal (AFP)	30
Spain (Promusicae)	2
Switzerland (Schweizer Hitparade)	31
US Billboard Hot 100	10
US Hot Latin Songs (Billboard)	1
US Latin Airplay (Billboard)	1
US Rhythmic Airplay (Billboard)	39
US Rolling Stone Top 100	3
Venezuela Airplay (Monitor Latino)	6

=== Year-end charts ===
2021 year-end chart performance for "Yonaguni"
Chart (2021)	Position
Global 200 (Billboard)	43
Portugal (AFP)	94
Spain (PROMUSICAE)	8
US Billboard Hot 100	83
US Hot Latin Songs (Billboard)	5

2022 year-end chart performance for "Yonaguni"
Chart (2022)	Position
Global 200 (Billboard)	55
Spain (PROMUSICAE)	50
US Hot Latin Songs (Billboard)	16

== Certifications ==
Region	Certification	Certified units/sales
Italy (FIMI)	Platinum	100,000^{‡}
Portugal (AFP)	Platinum	10,000^{‡}
Spain (Promusicae)	7× Platinum	420,000^{‡}
^{‡} Sales+streaming figures based on certification alone.

== See also ==
- List of Billboard number-one Latin songs of 2021

== Release history ==
Release history and formats for "Yonaguni"
Region	Date	Format(s)	Label	Ref.
Various	June 4, 2021	Digital download; streaming	Rimas	
