= List of number-one Billboard Hot Latin Tracks of 2004 =

This is a list containing the Billboard Hot Latin Tracks number-ones of 2004.

Issue date	Song	Artist(s)	Ref.
January 3	"Me Cansé De Ti"	Obie Bermúdez	
January 10	"Mientes Tan Bien"	Sin Bandera	
January 17	"Mientes Tan Bien"	Sin Bandera	
January 24	"Me Cansé De Ti"	Obie Bermudez	
January 31	"Cuidarte el Alma"	Chayanne	
February 7	"Cuidarte el Alma"	Chayanne	
February 14	"Cuidarte el Alma"	Chayanne	
February 21	"Te Quise Tanto"	Paulina Rubio	
February 28	"Cerca de Ti"	Thalía	
March 6	"Te Quise Tanto"	Paulina Rubio	
March 13	"Te Quise Tanto"	Paulina Rubio	
March 20	"Te Quise Tanto"	Paulina Rubio	
March 27	"Y Todo Queda en Nada"	Ricky Martin	
April 3	"Te Quise Tanto"	Paulina Rubio	
April 10	"Te Quise Tanto"	Paulina Rubio	
April 17	"Tengo Ganas"	Víctor Manuelle	
April 24	"Tengo Ganas"	Víctor Manuelle	
May 1	"Tengo Ganas"	Víctor Manuelle	
May 8	"Tu Fotografía"	Gloria Estefan	
May 15	"Más Que Tu Amigo"	Marco Antonio Solís	
May 22	"Abrazar la Vida"	Luis Fonsi	
May 29	"Vivo y Muero en tu Piel"	Jennifer Peña	
June 5	"Vivo y Muero en tu Piel"	Jennifer Peña	
June 12	"Vivo y Muero en tu Piel"	Jennifer Peña	
June 19	"Ahora Quién"	Marc Anthony	
June 26	"Vivo y Muero en tu Piel"	Jennifer Peña	
July 3	"Vivo y Muero en tu Piel"	Jennifer Peña	
July 10	"Ahora Quién"	Marc Anthony	
July 17	"Vivo y Muero en tu Piel"	Jennifer Peña	
July 24	"Qué De Raro Tiene"	Los Temerarios	
July 31	"Qué De Raro Tiene"	Los Temerarios	
August 7	"Qué De Raro Tiene"	Los Temerarios	
August 14	"Qué De Raro Tiene"	Los Temerarios	
August 21	"Qué De Raro Tiene"	Los Temerarios	
August 28	"Como Tú"	Carlos Vives	
September 4	"Como Tú"	Carlos Vives	
September 11	"Como Tú"	Carlos Vives	
September 18	"Son de Amores"	Andy & Lucas	
September 25	"Nada Valgo Sin Tu Amor"	Juanes	
October 2	"Nada Valgo Sin Tu Amor"	Juanes	
October 9	"Nada Valgo Sin Tu Amor"	Juanes	
October 16	"Nada Valgo Sin Tu Amor"	Juanes	
October 23	"Me Dediqué a Perderte"	Alejandro Fernández	
October 30	"Nada Valgo Sin Tu Amor"	Juanes	
November 6	"Nada Valgo Sin Tu Amor"	Juanes	
November 13	"Nada Valgo Sin Tu Amor"	Juanes	
November 20	"Nada Valgo Sin Tu Amor"	Juanes	
November 27	"Nada Valgo Sin Tu Amor"	Juanes	
December 4	"Nada Valgo Sin Tu Amor"	Juanes	
December 11	"Nada Valgo Sin Tu Amor"	Juanes	
December 18	"Me Dediqué a Perderte"	Alejandro Fernandez	
December 25	"Dame Otro Tequila"	Paulina Rubio	

== See also ==
- Hot Latin Tracks
