= List of number-one Billboard Hot Latin Songs of 2008 =

This is a list containing the Billboard Hot Latin Tracks number-ones of 2008.

== Chart history ==
Issue date	Song	Artist(s)	Ref
January 5	"Me Enamora"	Juanes	
January 12	"Me Enamora"	Juanes	
January 19	"Sexy Movimiento"	Wisin & Yandel	
January 26	"Me Enamora"	Juanes	
February 2	"Me Enamora"	Juanes	
February 9	"Me Enamora"	Juanes	
February 16	"Me Enamora"	Juanes	
February 23	"Gotas de Agua Dulce"	Juanes	
March 1	"Dónde Están Corazón"	Enrique Iglesias	
March 8	"Dónde Están Corazón"	Enrique Iglesias	
March 15	"Gotas de Agua Dulce"	Juanes	
March 22	"Gotas de Agua Dulce"	Juanes	
March 29	"Donde Están Corazón"	Enrique Iglesias	
April 5	"Te Quiero"	Flex	
April 12	"Te Quiero"	Flex	
April 19	"Te Quiero"	Flex	
April 26	"Si No Te Hubieras Ido"	Maná	
May 3	"Si No Te Hubieras Ido"	Maná	
May 10	"Te Quiero"	Flex	
May 17	"Te Quiero"	Flex	
May 24	"Te Quiero"	Flex	
May 31	"Te Quiero"	Flex	
June 7	"Te Quiero"	Flex	
June 14	"Te Quiero"	Flex	
June 21	"Te Quiero"	Flex	
June 28	"Te Quiero"	Flex	
July 5	"Te Quiero"	Flex	
July 12	"Te Quiero"	Flex	
July 19	"Si Tú Te Vas"	Los Temerarios	
July 26	"Te Quiero"	Flex	
August 2	"Te Quiero"	Flex	
August 9	"Te Quiero"	Flex	
August 16	"Te Quiero"	Flex	
August 23	"Te Quiero"	Flex	
August 30	"Te Quiero"	Flex	
September 6	"Te Quiero"	Flex	
September 13	"No Me Doy Por Vencido"	Luis Fonsi	
September 20	"No Me Doy Por Vencido"	Luis Fonsi	
September 27	"No Me Doy Por Vencido"	Luis Fonsi	
October 4	"No Me Doy Por Vencido"	Luis Fonsi	
October 11	"No Me Doy Por Vencido"	Luis Fonsi	
October 18	"No Me Doy Por Vencido"	Luis Fonsi	
October 25	"No Me Doy Por Vencido"	Luis Fonsi	
November 1	"No Me Doy Por Vencido"	Luis Fonsi	
November 8	"Lloro Por Ti"	Enrique Iglesias	
November 15	"Lloro Por Ti"	Enrique Iglesias	
November 22	"No Me Doy por Vencido"	Luis Fonsi	
November 29	"No Me Doy por Vencido"	Luis Fonsi	
December 6	"No Me Doy por Vencido"	Luis Fonsi	
December 13	"No Me Doy por Vencido"	Luis Fonsi	
December 20	"No Me Doy por Vencido"	Luis Fonsi	
December 26	"No Me Doy por Vencido"	Luis Fonsi	
