= List of number-one Billboard Hot Latin Tracks of 1994 =

This is a list containing the Billboard Hot Latin Tracks number-ones of 1994. On the week ending November 12, Billboard updated the methodology to incorporate the Nielsen Broadcast Data Systems (BDS).

Issue date	Song	Artist(s)	Ref.
January 1	"Cerca De Ti"	Barrio Boyzz	
January 8	"Cerca De Ti"	Barrio Boyzz	
January 15	"Cerca De Ti"	Barrio Boyzz	
January 22	"Cerca De Ti"	Barrio Boyzz	
January 29	"Detrás de Mi Ventana"	Yuri	
February 5	"Detrás de Mi Ventana"	Yuri	
February 12	"Detrás de Mi Ventana"	Yuri	
February 19	"Luna"	Ana Gabriel	
February 26	"Luna"	Ana Gabriel	
March 5	"Luna"	Ana Gabriel	
March 12	"Mi Buen Amor"	Gloria Estefan	
March 19	"Mi Buen Amor"	Gloria Estefan	
March 26	"Donde Quiera Que Estés"	Barrio Boyzz and Selena	
April 2	"Donde Quiera Que Estés"	Barrio Boyzz and Selena	
April 9	"Donde Quiera Que Estés"	Barrio Boyzz and Selena	
April 16	"Donde Quiera Que Estés"	Barrio Boyzz and Selena	
April 23	"Donde Quiera Que Estés"	Barrio Boyzz and Selena	
April 30	"Donde Quiera Que Estés"	Barrio Boyzz and Selena	
May 7	"Vida"	La Mafia	
May 14	"Con Un Nudo en la Garganta"	Pimpinela	
May 21	"Vida"	La Mafia	
May 28	"Vida"	La Mafia	
June 4	"Vida"	La Mafia	
June 11	"Amor Prohibido"	Selena	
June 18	"Amor Prohibido"	Selena	
June 25	"Amor Prohibido"	Selena	
July 2	"Amor Prohibido"	Selena	
July 9	"Amor Prohibido"	Selena	
July 16	"Amor Prohibido"	Selena	
July 23	"Amor Prohibido"	Selena	
July 30	"Amor Prohibido"	Selena	
August 6	"Amor Prohibido"	Selena	
August 13	"Si Te Vas"	Jon Secada	
August 20	"Si Te Vas"	Jon Secada	
August 27	"Pero Qué Necesidad"	Juan Gabriel	
September 3	"Quisiera"	Ricardo Montaner	
September 10	"Pero Qué Necesidad"	Juan Gabriel	
September 17	"El Día Que Me Quieras"	Luis Miguel	
September 24	"El Día Que Me Quieras"	Luis Miguel	
October 1	"El Día Que Me Quieras"	Luis Miguel	
October 8	"El Día Que Me Quieras"	Luis Miguel	
October 15	"El Día Que Me Quieras"	Luis Miguel	
October 22	"Bidi Bidi Bom Bom"	Selena	
October 29	"Bidi Bidi Bom Bom"	Selena	
November 5	"Bidi Bidi Bom Bom"	Selena	
November 12	"Bidi Bidi Bom Bom"	Selena	
November 19	"Ni El Primero Ni El Ultimo"	Los Rehenes	
November 26	"La Media Vuelta"	Luis Miguel	
December 3	"La Media Vuelta"	Luis Miguel	
December 10	"La Media Vuelta"	Luis Miguel	
December 17	"No Me Queda Más"	Selena	
December 24	"No Me Queda Más"	Selena	
December 31	"No Me Queda Más"	Selena	

== See also ==
- Billboard Hot Latin Tracks
