= List of number-one Billboard Hot Latin Tracks of 2002 =

This is a list containing the Billboard Hot Latin Tracks number-ones of 2002.

Issue date	Song	Artist(s)	Ref.
January 5	"Tantita Pena"	Alejandro Fernández	
January 12	"Tantita Pena"	Alejandro Fernández	
January 19	"Déjame Entrar"	Carlos Vives	
January 26	"Tantita Pena"	Alejandro Fernandez	
February 2	"Cómo Duele"	Luis Miguel	
February 9	"Cómo Duele"	Luis Miguel	
February 16	"Suerte"	Shakira	
February 23	"Flor Sin Retoño"	Charlie Zaa	
March 2	"Flor Sin Retoño"	Charlie Zaa	
March 9	"Flor Sin Retoño"	Charlie Zaa	
March 16	"Flor Sin Retoño"	Charlie Zaa	
March 23	"Luna Nueva"	Carlos Vives	
March 30	"Quítame Ese Hombre"	Pilar Montenegro	
April 6	"Quítame Ese Hombre"	Pilar Montenegro	
April 13	"Quítame Ese Hombre"	Pilar Montenegro	
April 20	"Quítame Ese Hombre"	Pilar Montenegro	
April 27	"Quítame Ese Hombre"	Pilar Montenegro	
May 4	"Quítame Ese Hombre"	Pilar Montenegro	
May 11	"Quítame Ese Hombre"	Pilar Montenegro	
May 18	"Quítame Ese Hombre"	Pilar Montenegro	
May 25	"Quítame Ese Hombre"	Pilar Montenegro	
June 1	"Quítame Ese Hombre"	Pilar Montenegro	
June 8	"Quítame Ese Hombre"	Pilar Montenegro	
June 15	"Y Tú Te Vas"	Chayanne	
June 22	"Quítame Ese Hombre"	Pilar Montenegro	
June 29	"Y Tú Te Vas"	Chayanne	
July 6	"Quitame Ese Hombre"	Pilar Montenegro	
July 13	"Y Tú Te Vas"	Chayanne	
July 20	"Tú y Yo"	Thalía	
July 27	"Y Tú Te Vas"	Chayanne	
August 3	"Y Tú Te Vas"	Chayanne	
August 10	"Y Tú Te Vas"	Chayanne	
August 17	"Y Tú Te Vas"	Chayanne	
August 24	"El Dolor de Tu Presencia"	Jennifer Peña	
August 31	"El Dolor de Tu Presencia"	Jennifer Peña	
September 7	"El Dolor de Tu Presencia"	Jennifer Peña	
September 14	"El Dolor de Tu Presencia"	Jennifer Peña	
September 21	"El Dolor de Tu Presencia"	Jennifer Peña	
September 28	"Mentiroso"	Enrique Iglesias	
October 5	"El Dolor de Tu Presencia"	Jennifer Peña	
October 12	"El Dolor de Tu Presencia"	Jennifer Peña	
October 19	"El Dolor de Tu Presencia"	Jennifer Peña	
October 26	"No Me Enseñaste"	Thalía	
November 2	"No Me Enseñaste"	Thalía	
November 9	"Aserejé"	Las Ketchup	
November 16	"Aserejé"	Las Ketchup	
November 23	"Aserejé"	Las Ketchup	
November 30	"Aserejé"	Las Ketchup	
December 7	"El Problema"	Ricardo Arjona	
December 14	"El Problema"	Ricardo Arjona	
December 21	"El Problema"	Ricardo Arjona	
December 28	"El Problema"	Ricardo Arjona	

== See also ==
- Billboard Hot Latin Tracks
