= List of number-one Billboard Hot Latin Songs of 2006 =

This is a list containing the Billboard Hot Latin Tracks number-ones of 2006.

Issue date	Song	Artist(s)
January 7	"Rompe"	Daddy Yankee
January 14	"Rompe"	Daddy Yankee
January 21	"Rompe"	Daddy Yankee
January 28	"Rompe"	Daddy Yankee
February 4	"Rompe"	Daddy Yankee
February 11	"Rompe"	Daddy Yankee
February 18	"Rompe"	Daddy Yankee
February 25	"Rompe"	Daddy Yankee
March 4	"Rompe"	Daddy Yankee
March 11	"Rompe"	Daddy Yankee
March 18	"Rompe"	Daddy Yankee
March 25	"Rompe"	Daddy Yankee
April 1	"Llame Pa' Verte"	Wisin & Yandel
April 8	"Llame Pa' Verte"	Wisin & Yandel
April 15	"Lo Que Son Las Cosas"	Anaís
April 22	"Lo Que Son Las Cosas"	Anaís
April 29	"Lo Que Son Las Cosas"	Anaís
May 6	"Lo Que Son Las Cosas"	Anaís
May 13	"Lo Que Son Las Cosas"	Anaís
May 20	"Lo Que Son Las Cosas"	Anaís
May 27	"Hips Don't Lie"	Shakira featuring Wyclef Jean
June 3	"Hips Don't Lie"	Shakira featuring Wyclef Jean
June 10	"Hips Don't Lie"	Shakira featuring Wyclef Jean
June 17	"Hips Don't Lie"	Shakira featuring Wyclef Jean
June 24	"Hips Don't Lie"	Shakira featuring Wyclef Jean
July 1	"Hips Don't Lie"	Shakira featuring Wyclef Jean
July 8	"Hips Don't Lie"	Shakira featuring Wyclef Jean
July 15	"Hips Don't Lie"	Shakira featuring Wyclef Jean
July 22	"Angelito"	Don Omar
July 29	"Down"	Rakim y Ken-Y
August 5	"Labios Compartidos"	Maná
August 12	"Labios Compartidos"	Maná
August 19	"Labios Compartidos"	Maná
August 26	"Labios Compartidos"	Maná
September 2	"Labios Compartidos"	Maná
September 9	"Labios Compartidos"	Maná
September 16	"Labios Compartidos"	Maná
September 23	"Labios Compartidos"	Maná
September 30	"Ni Una Sola Palabra"	Paulina Rubio
October 7	"Ni Una Sola Palabra"	Paulina Rubio
October 14	"Ni Una Sola Palabra"	Paulina Rubio
October 21	"Ni Una Sola Palabra"	Paulina Rubio
October 28	"¿Quién Me Iba a Decir?"	David Bisbal
November 4	"Pam Pam"	Wisin & Yandel
November 11	"¿Quién Me Iba a Decir?"	David Bisbal
November 18	"¿Quién Me Iba a Decir?"	David Bisbal
November 25	"A la Primera Persona"	Alejandro Sanz
December 2	"Ser o Parecer"	RBD
December 9	"Ser o Parecer"	RBD
December 16	"Bendita Tu Luz"	Maná featuring Juan Luis Guerra
December 23	"Tu Recuerdo"	Ricky Martin featuring La Mari and Tommy Torres
December 30	"Tu Recuerdo"	Ricky Martin featuring La Mari and Tommy Torres
