= O Me Voy O Te Vas =

"O Me Voy o Te Vas"

Single by Marco Antonio Solís

from the album Más de Mi Alma
- Released: 2001
- Genre: Latin pop; Bolero
- Length: 4:49
- Label: Fonovisa
- Songwriter: Marco Antonio Solís

"O me voy o te Vas" (transl. "Either I'll Go or You'll Go") is a song written and recorded by Marco Antonio Solís, which was released in 2001 as the lead single from his fourth studio album Más de Mi Alma (2001). A song about a relationship that has gotten to the point of breaking up, it was commercially successful and impacted Spanish-language radio in the United States and eventually topped the Billboard Hot Latin Tracks chart. It also appeared on Billboard's Bubbling Under the Hot 100 chart, reaching a highest position of 16.

"O Me Voy o Te Vas" was nominated for Pop Song of the Year at the 2002 Lo Nuestro Awards and for Hot Latin Track of the Year at the 2002 Billboard Latin Music Awards. Mexican singer Natanael Cano released a cover of the song on October 11, 2023.

== Charts ==
Chart performance for "O Me Voy o Te Vas"
Chart (2001)	Peak position
US Bubbling Under Hot 100 (Billboard)	16
US Hot Latin Songs (Billboard)	1
US Latin Pop Airplay (Billboard)	3
US Regional Mexican Airplay (Billboard)	4

Chart performance for Natanael Cano's version
Chart (2023)	Peak position
Global Excl. US (Billboard)	173
Mexico (Mexico Songs)	13
US Hot Latin Songs (Billboard)	47
