= List of number-one Billboard Hot Latin Tracks of 1995 =

This is a list containing the Billboard Hot Latin Tracks number-ones of 1995.

| Issue date | Song | Artist(s) | Ref. |
|---|---|---|---|
| January 7 | "No Me Queda Más" | Selena | |
| January 14 | "No Me Queda Más" | Selena | |
| January 21 | "Me Duele Estar Solo" | La Mafia | |
| January 28 | "No Me Queda Más" | Selena | |
| February 4 | "No Me Queda Más" | Selena | |
| February 11 | "Que No Me Olvide" | Bronco | |
| February 18 | "Que No Me Olvide" | Bronco | |
| February 25 | "Que No Me Olvide" | Bronco | |
| March 4 | "Que No Me Olvide" | Bronco | |
| March 11 | "Que No Me Olvide" | Bronco | |
| March 18 | "Que No Me Olvide" | Bronco | |
| March 25 | "Que No Me Olvide" | Bronco | |
| April 1 | "Que No Me Olvide" | Bronco | |
| April 8 | "Toma Mi Amor" | La Mafia | |
| April 15 | "Fotos y Recuerdos" | Selena | |
| April 22 | "Fotos y Recuerdos" | Selena | |
| April 29 | "Fotos y Recuerdos" | Selena | |
| May 6 | "Fotos y Recuerdos" | Selena | |
| May 13 | "Fotos y Recuerdos" | Selena | |
| May 20 | "Fotos y Recuerdos" | Selena | |
| May 27 | "Fotos y Recuerdos" | Selena | |
| June 3 | "Una Mujer Como Tú" | Marco Antonio Solís and Los Bukis | |
| June 10 | "Una Mujer Como Tú" | Marco Antonio Solís and Los Bukis | |
| June 17 | "Una Mujer Como Tú" | Marco Antonio Solís and Los Bukis | |
| June 24 | "Una Mujer Como Tú" | Marco Antonio Solís and Los Bukis | |
| July 1 | "Una Mujer Como Tú" | Marco Antonio Solís and Los Bukis | |
| July 8 | "Una Mujer Como Tú" | Marco Antonio Solís and Los Bukis | |
| July 15 | "El Palo" | Juan Gabriel | |
| July 22 | "Tú Sólo Tú" | Selena | |
| July 29 | "Tú Sólo Tú" | Selena | |
| August 5 | "Tú Sólo Tú" | Selena | |
| August 12 | "Tú Sólo Tú" | Selena | |
| August 19 | "Tú Sólo Tú" | Selena | |
| August 26 | "Tú Sólo Tú" | Selena | |
| September 2 | "Tú Sólo Tú" | Selena | |
| September 9 | "Tú Sólo Tú" | Selena | |
| September 16 | "Tú Sólo Tú" | Selena | |
| September 23 | "Tú Sólo Tú" | Selena | |
| September 30 | "Si nos dejan" | Luis Miguel | |
| October 7 | "Si nos dejan" | Luis Miguel | |
| October 14 | "Si nos dejan" | Luis Miguel | |
| October 21 | "Abriendo Puertas" | Gloria Estefan | |
| October 28 | "Si nos dejan" | Luis Miguel | |
| November 4 | "Si nos dejan" | Luis Miguel | |
| November 11 | "Si nos dejan" | Luis Miguel | |
| November 18 | "Si nos dejan" | Luis Miguel | |
| November 25 | "Abriendo Puertas" | Gloria Estefan | |
| December 2 | "Si Tú Te Vas" | Enrique Iglesias | |
| December 9 | "Si Tú Te Vas" | Enrique Iglesias | |
| December 16 | "Si Tú Te Vas" | Enrique Iglesias | |
| December 23 | "Si Tú Te Vas" | Enrique Iglesias | |
| December 30 | "Si Tú Te Vas" | Enrique Iglesias | |

== See also ==
- Billboard Hot Latin Tracks
