= List of Billboard Hot Latin Songs and Latin Airplay number ones of 2017 =

The Billboard Hot Latin Songs and Latin Airplay are charts that rank the best-performing Latin songs in the United States and are both published weekly by Billboard magazine. The Hot Latin Songs ranks the best-performing Spanish-language songs in the country based digital downloads, streaming, and airplay from all radio stations. The Latin Airplay chart ranks the most-played songs on Spanish-language radio stations in the United States.

== Chart history ==
Chart history
Issue date	Hot Latin Songs			Latin Airplay		
Issue date	Title	Artist(s)	Ref.	Title	Artist(s)	Ref.
January 7	"Chantaje"	Shakira featuring Maluma		"Chantaje"	Shakira featuring Maluma	
January 14	"Chantaje"	Shakira featuring Maluma		"Chantaje"	Shakira featuring Maluma	
January 21	"Chantaje"	Shakira featuring Maluma		"Te Quiero Pa' Mi"	Don Omar and Zion & Lennox	
January 28	"Chantaje"	Shakira featuring Maluma		"Te Quiero Pa' Mi"	Don Omar and Zion & Lennox	
February 4	"Chantaje"	Shakira featuring Maluma		"Te Quiero Pa' Mi"	Don Omar and Zion & Lennox	
February 11	"Chantaje"	Shakira featuring Maluma		"Sin Contrato"	Maluma featuring Fifth Harmony or Don Omar and Wisin	
February 18	"Despacito"	Luis Fonsi featuring Daddy Yankee		"El Amante"	Nicky Jam	
February 25	"Despacito"	Luis Fonsi featuring Daddy Yankee		"El Amante"	Nicky Jam	
March 4	"Despacito"	Luis Fonsi featuring Daddy Yankee		"Héroe Favorito"	Romeo Santos	
March 11	"Despacito"	Luis Fonsi featuring Daddy Yankee		"Despacito"	Luis Fonsi and Daddy Yankee featuring Justin Bieber	
March 18	"Despacito"	Luis Fonsi featuring Daddy Yankee		"Despacito"	Luis Fonsi and Daddy Yankee featuring Justin Bieber	
March 25	"Despacito"	Luis Fonsi featuring Daddy Yankee		"Despacito"	Luis Fonsi and Daddy Yankee featuring Justin Bieber	
April 1	"Despacito"	Luis Fonsi featuring Daddy Yankee		"Despacito"	Luis Fonsi and Daddy Yankee featuring Justin Bieber	
April 8	"Despacito"	Luis Fonsi featuring Daddy Yankee		"Despacito"	Luis Fonsi and Daddy Yankee featuring Justin Bieber	
April 15	"Despacito"	Luis Fonsi featuring Daddy Yankee		"Súbeme la Radio"	Enrique Iglesias featuring Descemer Bueno, Zion & Lennox or Sean Paul	
April 22	"Despacito"	Luis Fonsi featuring Daddy Yankee		"Despacito"	Luis Fonsi and Daddy Yankee featuring Justin Bieber	
April 29	"Despacito"	Luis Fonsi featuring Daddy Yankee		"Despacito"	Luis Fonsi and Daddy Yankee featuring Justin Bieber	
May 6	"Despacito"	Luis Fonsi and Daddy Yankee featuring Justin Bieber		"Despacito"	Luis Fonsi and Daddy Yankee featuring Justin Bieber	
May 13	"Despacito"	Luis Fonsi and Daddy Yankee featuring Justin Bieber		"Despacito"	Luis Fonsi and Daddy Yankee featuring Justin Bieber	
May 20	"Despacito"	Luis Fonsi and Daddy Yankee featuring Justin Bieber		"Despacito"	Luis Fonsi and Daddy Yankee featuring Justin Bieber	
May 27	"Despacito"	Luis Fonsi and Daddy Yankee featuring Justin Bieber		"Despacito"	Luis Fonsi and Daddy Yankee featuring Justin Bieber	
June 3	"Despacito"	Luis Fonsi and Daddy Yankee featuring Justin Bieber		"Despacito"	Luis Fonsi and Daddy Yankee featuring Justin Bieber	
June 10	"Despacito"	Luis Fonsi and Daddy Yankee featuring Justin Bieber		"Despacito"	Luis Fonsi and Daddy Yankee featuring Justin Bieber	
June 17	"Despacito"	Luis Fonsi and Daddy Yankee featuring Justin Bieber		"Despacito"	Luis Fonsi and Daddy Yankee featuring Justin Bieber	
June 24	"Despacito"	Luis Fonsi and Daddy Yankee featuring Justin Bieber		"Despacito"	Luis Fonsi and Daddy Yankee featuring Justin Bieber	
July 1	"Despacito"	Luis Fonsi and Daddy Yankee featuring Justin Bieber		"Despacito"	Luis Fonsi and Daddy Yankee featuring Justin Bieber	
July 8	"Despacito"	Luis Fonsi and Daddy Yankee featuring Justin Bieber		"Despacito"	Luis Fonsi and Daddy Yankee featuring Justin Bieber	
July 15	"Despacito"	Luis Fonsi and Daddy Yankee featuring Justin Bieber		"Despacito"	Luis Fonsi and Daddy Yankee featuring Justin Bieber	
July 22	"Despacito"	Luis Fonsi and Daddy Yankee featuring Justin Bieber		"Despacito"	Luis Fonsi and Daddy Yankee featuring Justin Bieber	
July 29	"Despacito"	Luis Fonsi and Daddy Yankee featuring Justin Bieber		"Imitadora"	Romeo Santos	
August 5	"Despacito"	Luis Fonsi and Daddy Yankee featuring Justin Bieber		"Imitadora"	Romeo Santos	
August 12	"Despacito"	Luis Fonsi and Daddy Yankee featuring Justin Bieber		"Imitadora"	Romeo Santos	
August 19	"Despacito"	Luis Fonsi and Daddy Yankee featuring Justin Bieber		"Imitadora"	Romeo Santos	
August 26	"Despacito"	Luis Fonsi and Daddy Yankee featuring Justin Bieber		"Felices los 4"	Maluma	
September 2	"Despacito"	Luis Fonsi and Daddy Yankee featuring Justin Bieber		"Felices los 4"	Maluma	
September 9	"Despacito"	Luis Fonsi and Daddy Yankee featuring Justin Bieber		"Escápate Conmigo"	Wisin featuring Ozuna	
September 16	"Despacito"	Luis Fonsi and Daddy Yankee featuring Justin Bieber		"Mi Gente"	J Balvin and Willy William featuring Beyoncé	
September 23	"Despacito"	Luis Fonsi and Daddy Yankee featuring Justin Bieber		"Mi Gente"	J Balvin and Willy William featuring Beyoncé	
September 30	"Despacito"	Luis Fonsi and Daddy Yankee featuring Justin Bieber		"Mi Gente"	J Balvin and Willy William featuring Beyoncé	
October 7	"Despacito"	Luis Fonsi and Daddy Yankee featuring Justin Bieber		"Como Antes"	Yandel featuring Wisin	
October 14	"Despacito"	Luis Fonsi and Daddy Yankee featuring Justin Bieber		"Como Antes"	Yandel featuring Wisin	
October 21	"Mi Gente"	J Balvin and Willy William featuring Beyoncé		"Mi Gente"	J Balvin and Willy William featuring Beyoncé	
October 28	"Mi Gente"	J Balvin and Willy William featuring Beyoncé		"Mi Gente"	J Balvin and Willy William featuring Beyoncé	
November 4	"Mi Gente"	J Balvin and Willy William featuring Beyoncé		"Mi Gente"	J Balvin and Willy William featuring Beyoncé	
November 11	"Mi Gente"	J Balvin and Willy William featuring Beyoncé		"Mi Gente"	J Balvin and Willy William featuring Beyoncé	
November 18	"Mi Gente"	J Balvin and Willy William featuring Beyoncé		"Mi Gente"	J Balvin and Willy William featuring Beyoncé	
November 25	"Mi Gente"	J Balvin and Willy William featuring Beyoncé		"Mi Gente"	J Balvin and Willy William featuring Beyoncé	
December 2	"Mi Gente"	J Balvin and Willy William featuring Beyoncé		"Mi Gente"	J Balvin and Willy William featuring Beyoncé	
December 9	"Mi Gente"	J Balvin and Willy William featuring Beyoncé		"Mi Gente"	J Balvin and Willy William featuring Beyoncé	
December 16	"Mi Gente"	J Balvin and Willy William featuring Beyoncé		"Mi Gente"	J Balvin and Willy William featuring Beyoncé	
December 23	"Mi Gente"	J Balvin and Willy William featuring Beyoncé		"Perro Fiel"	Shakira featuring Nicky Jam	
December 30	"Mi Gente"	J Balvin and Willy William featuring Beyoncé		"Perro Fiel"	Shakira featuring Nicky Jam	
