= List of number-one Billboard Top Latin Songs of 2010 =

The Billboard Hot Latin Songs chart ranks the best-performing Spanish-language singles in the United States. Published by Billboard magazine, the data are compiled by Nielsen SoundScan based collectively on each single's weekly physical and digital sales, and airplay.

== Chart history ==
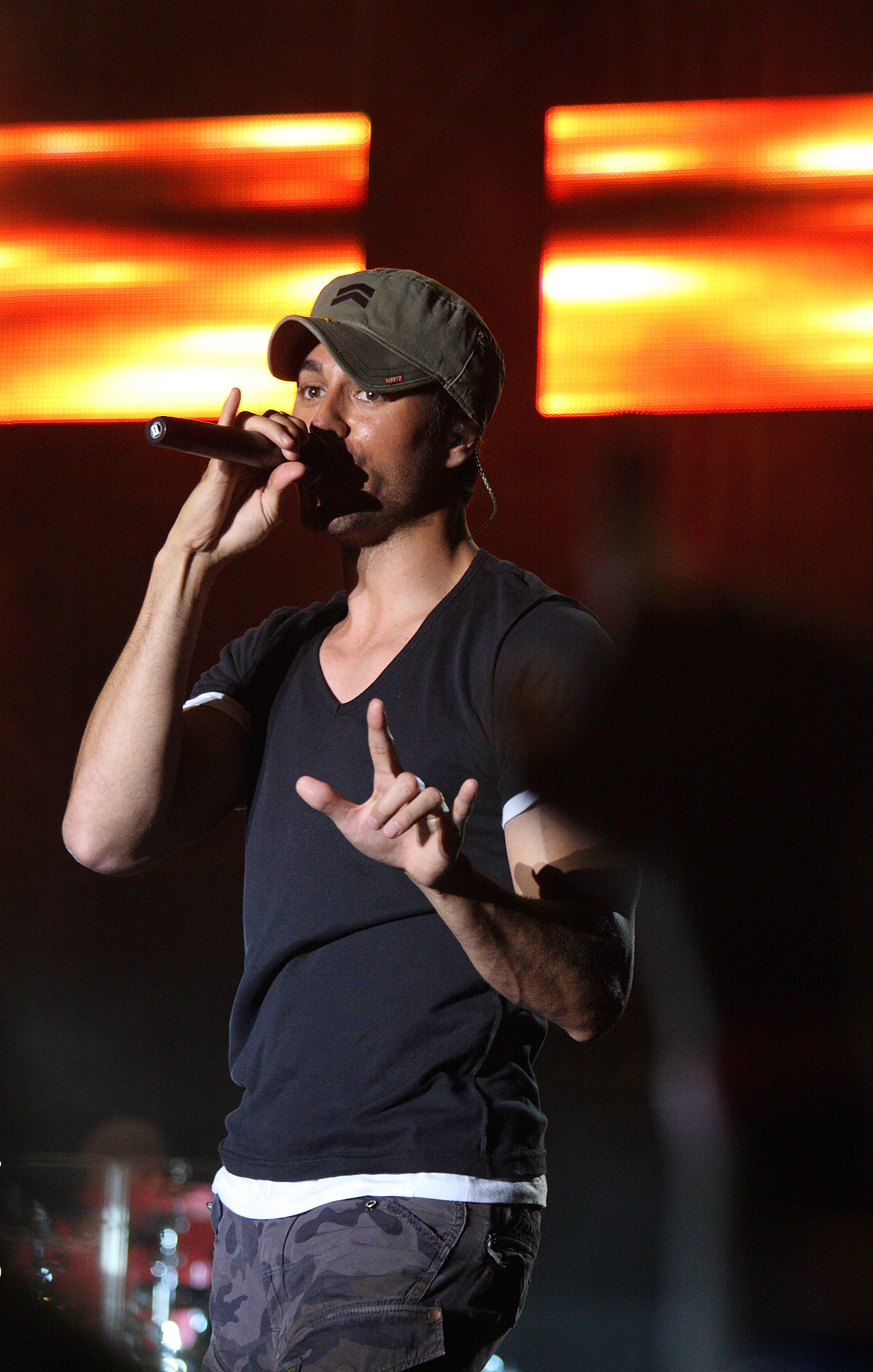
Spanish singer Enrique Iglesias remained at the top of the chart for a record 17 non-consecutive weeks with his single "Cuando Me Enamoro" alongside Juan Luis Guerra.

Issue date	Song	Artist(s)	Ref.
January 2	"Me Gusta Todo de Tí"	Banda El Recodo	
January 9	"Me Gusta Todo de Tí"	Banda El Recodo	
January 16	"Me Gusta Todo de Tí"	Banda El Recodo	
January 23	"Dile al Amor"	Aventura	
January 30	"Dile al Amor"	Aventura	
February 6	"Se Me Va la Voz"	Alejandro Fernández	
February 13	"Dile al Amor"	Aventura	
February 20	"Dile al Amor"	Aventura	
February 27	"Dile al Amor"	Aventura	
March 6	"Dile al Amor"	Aventura	
March 13	"Dile al Amor"	Aventura	
March 20	"Ando Bien Pedo"	Banda Los Recoditos	
March 27	"Ando Bien Pedo"	Banda Los Recoditos	
April 3	"Dile al Amor"	Aventura	
April 10	"Dile al Amor"	Aventura	
April 17	"Me Gusta Todo de Tí"	Banda El Recodo	
April 24	"Ando Bien Pedo"	Banda Los Recoditos	
May 1	"Ando Bien Pedo"	Banda Los Recoditos	
May 8	"Niña Bonita"	Chino & Nacho	
May 15	"Niña Bonita"	Chino & Nacho	
May 22	"Niña Bonita"	Chino & Nacho	
May 29	"Guapa"	Diego Torres	
June 5	"Bachata en Fukuoka"	Juan Luis Guerra	
June 12	"Cuando Me Enamoro"	Enrique Iglesias featuring Juan Luis Guerra	
June 19	"Cuando Me Enamoro"	Enrique Iglesias featuring Juan Luis Guerra	
June 26	"Cuando Me Enamoro"	Enrique Iglesias featuring Juan Luis Guerra	
July 3	"Cuando Me Enamoro"	Enrique Iglesias featuring Juan Luis Guerra	
July 10	"Cuando Me Enamoro"	Enrique Iglesias featuring Juan Luis Guerra	
July 17	"Cuando Me Enamoro"	Enrique Iglesias featuring Juan Luis Guerra	
July 24	"Cuando Me Enamoro"	Enrique Iglesias featuring Juan Luis Guerra	
July 31	"Cuando Me Enamoro"	Enrique Iglesias featuring Juan Luis Guerra	
August 7	"Cuando Me Enamoro"	Enrique Iglesias featuring Juan Luis Guerra	
August 14	"Cuando Me Enamoro"	Enrique Iglesias featuring Juan Luis Guerra	
August 21	"Cuando Me Enamoro"	Enrique Iglesias featuring Juan Luis Guerra	
August 28	"Cuando Me Enamoro"	Enrique Iglesias featuring Juan Luis Guerra	
September 4	"Yerbatero"	Juanes	
September 11	"Cuando Me Enamoro"	Enrique Iglesias featuring Juan Luis Guerra	
September 18	"Cuando Me Enamoro"	Enrique Iglesias featuring Juan Luis Guerra	
September 25	"Cuando Me Enamoro"	Enrique Iglesias featuring Juan Luis Guerra	
October 2	"Cuando Me Enamoro"	Enrique Iglesias featuring Juan Luis Guerra	
October 9	"Cuando Me Enamoro"	Enrique Iglesias featuring Juan Luis Guerra	
October 16	"Niña de Mi Corazón"	La Arrolladora Banda El Limón	
October 23	"Niña de Mi Corazón"	La Arrolladora Banda El Limón	
October 30	"Niña de Mi Corazón"	La Arrolladora Banda El Limón	
November 6	"Loca"	Shakira featuring El Cata	
November 13	"Danza Kuduro"	Don Omar & Lucenzo	
November 20	"Danza Kuduro"	Don Omar & Lucenzo	
November 27	"Danza Kuduro"	Don Omar & Lucenzo	
December 4	"Danza Kuduro"	Don Omar & Lucenzo	
December 11	"Danza Kuduro"	Don Omar & Lucenzo	
December 18	"Danza Kuduro"	Don Omar & Lucenzo	
December 25	"Danza Kuduro"	Don Omar & Lucenzo	
