= List of Billboard Hot Latin Songs and Latin Airplay number ones of 2015 =

The Billboard Hot Latin Songs and Latin Airplay are charts that rank the best-performing Latin songs in the United States and are both published weekly by Billboard magazine. The Hot Latin Songs ranks the best-performing Spanish-language songs in the country based digital downloads, streaming, and airplay from all radio stations. The Latin Airplay chart ranks the most-played songs on Spanish-language radio stations in the United States.

== Chart history ==
Chart history
Issue date	Hot Latin Songs			Latin Airplay		
Issue date	Title	Artist(s)	Ref.	Title	Artist(s)	Ref.
January 3	"Bailando"	Enrique Iglesias featuring Descemer Bueno and Gente de Zona		"Que Suenen los Tambores"	Víctor Manuelle	
January 10	"Bailando"	Enrique Iglesias featuring Descemer Bueno and Gente de Zona		"Que Suenen los Tambores"	Víctor Manuelle	
January 17	"Bailando"	Enrique Iglesias featuring Descemer Bueno and Gente de Zona		"Eres una Niña"	Gerardo Ortíz	
January 24	"Bailando"	Enrique Iglesias featuring Descemer Bueno and Gente de Zona		"Eres una Niña"	Gerardo Ortíz	
January 31	"Bailando"	Enrique Iglesias featuring Descemer Bueno and Gente de Zona		"Eres una Niña"	Gerardo Ortíz	
February 7	"Bailando"	Enrique Iglesias featuring Descemer Bueno and Gente de Zona		"Eres una Niña"	Gerardo Ortíz	
February 14	"Bailando"	Enrique Iglesias featuring Descemer Bueno and Gente de Zona		"Soledad"	Don Omar	
February 21	"Bailando"	Enrique Iglesias featuring Descemer Bueno and Gente de Zona		"Levantando Polvadera"	Voz de Mando	
February 28	"Mi Verdad"	Maná featuring Shakira		"Mi Verdad"	Maná featuring Shakira	
March 7	"Ay Vamos"	J Balvin		"Mi Verdad"	Maná featuring Shakira	
March 14	"El Karma"	Ariel Camacho y Los Plebes del Rancho		"Disparo al Corazón"	Ricky Martin	
March 21	"El Perdón"	Nicky Jam and Enrique Iglesias		"Piensas (Dile la Verdad)"	Pitbull featuring Gente de Zona	
March 28	"El Perdón"	Nicky Jam and Enrique Iglesias		"El Perdón"	Nicky Jam and Enrique Iglesias	
April 4	"El Perdón"	Nicky Jam and Enrique Iglesias		"El Perdón"	Nicky Jam and Enrique Iglesias	
April 11	"El Perdón"	Nicky Jam and Enrique Iglesias		"El Perdón"	Nicky Jam and Enrique Iglesias	
April 18	"El Perdón"	Nicky Jam and Enrique Iglesias		"Juntos (Together)"	Juanes	
April 25	"El Perdón"	Nicky Jam and Enrique Iglesias		"Nota de Amor"	Wisin and Carlos Vives featuring Daddy Yankee	
May 2	"El Perdón"	Nicky Jam and Enrique Iglesias		"Nota de Amor"	Wisin and Carlos Vives featuring Daddy Yankee	
May 9	"El Perdón"	Nicky Jam and Enrique Iglesias		"Hilito"	Romeo Santos	
May 16	"El Perdón"	Nicky Jam and Enrique Iglesias		"El Perdón"	Nicky Jam and Enrique Iglesias	
May 23	"El Perdón"	Nicky Jam and Enrique Iglesias		"Sígueme y Te Sigo"	Daddy Yankee	
May 30	"El Perdón"	Nicky Jam and Enrique Iglesias		"El Perdón"	Nicky Jam and Enrique Iglesias	
June 6	"El Perdón"	Nicky Jam and Enrique Iglesias		"El Perdón"	Nicky Jam and Enrique Iglesias	
June 13	"El Perdón"	Nicky Jam and Enrique Iglesias		"El Perdón"	Nicky Jam and Enrique Iglesias	
June 20	"El Perdón"	Nicky Jam and Enrique Iglesias		"El Perdón"	Nicky Jam and Enrique Iglesias	
June 27	"El Perdón"	Nicky Jam and Enrique Iglesias		"El Perdón"	Nicky Jam and Enrique Iglesias	
July 4	"El Perdón"	Nicky Jam and Enrique Iglesias		"El Perdón"	Nicky Jam and Enrique Iglesias	
July 11	"El Perdón"	Nicky Jam and Enrique Iglesias		"El Perdón"	Nicky Jam and Enrique Iglesias	
July 18	"El Perdón"	Nicky Jam and Enrique Iglesias		"El Perdón"	Nicky Jam and Enrique Iglesias	
July 25	"El Perdón"	Nicky Jam and Enrique Iglesias		"El Perdón"	Nicky Jam and Enrique Iglesias	
August 1	"El Perdón"	Nicky Jam and Enrique Iglesias		"El Perdón"	Nicky Jam and Enrique Iglesias	
August 8	"El Perdón"	Nicky Jam and Enrique Iglesias		"El Perdón"	Nicky Jam and Enrique Iglesias	
August 15	"El Perdón"	Nicky Jam and Enrique Iglesias		"Calentura"	Yandel	
August 22	"El Perdón"	Nicky Jam and Enrique Iglesias		"El Perdón"	Nicky Jam and Enrique Iglesias	
August 29	"El Perdón"	Nicky Jam and Enrique Iglesias		"La Gozadera"	Gente de Zona featuring Marc Anthony	
September 5	"El Perdón"	Nicky Jam and Enrique Iglesias		"La Mordidita"	Ricky Martin featuring Yotuel	
September 12	"El Perdón"	Nicky Jam and Enrique Iglesias		"Si lo Hacemos Bien"	Wisin	
September 19	"El Perdón"	Nicky Jam and Enrique Iglesias		"Ginza"	J Balvin	
September 26	"El Perdón"	Nicky Jam and Enrique Iglesias		"Ginza"	J Balvin	
October 3	"El Perdón"	Nicky Jam and Enrique Iglesias		"Ginza"	J Balvin	
October 10	"El Perdón"	Nicky Jam and Enrique Iglesias		"Ginza"	J Balvin	
October 17	"Ginza"	J Balvin		"Ginza"	J Balvin	
October 24	"Ginza"	J Balvin		"Ginza"	J Balvin	
October 31	"Ginza"	J Balvin		"Ginza"	J Balvin	
November 7	"Ginza"	J Balvin		"Sunset"	Farruko featuring Shaggy and Nicky Jam	
November 14	"Ginza"	J Balvin		"Ginza"	J Balvin	
November 21	"Ginza"	J Balvin		"Borró Cassette"	Maluma	
November 28	"Ginza"	J Balvin		"Borró Cassette"	Maluma	
December 5	"Ginza"	J Balvin		"Después de Ti Quién"	La Adictiva Banda San Jose de Mesillas	
December 12	"Ginza"	J Balvin		"Borró Cassette"	Maluma	
December 19	"Ginza"	J Balvin		"El Mismo Sol"	Álvaro Soler featuring Jennifer Lopez	
December 26	"Ginza"	J Balvin		"Ginza"	J Balvin	
