= List of number-one Billboard Hot Latin Tracks of 1991 =

This is a list containing the Billboard Hot Latin Tracks number-ones of 1991.

| Issue date | Song | Artist(s) | Ref. |
|---|---|---|---|
| January 5 | "Es Demasiado Tarde" | Ana Gabriel | |
| January 12 | "Es Demasiado Tarde" | Ana Gabriel | |
| January 19 | "Es Demasiado Tarde" | Ana Gabriel | |
| January 26 | "Es Demasiado Tarde" | Ana Gabriel | |
| February 2 | "Es Demasiado Tarde" | Ana Gabriel | |
| February 9 | "Es Demasiado Tarde" | Ana Gabriel | |
| February 16 | "Te Pareces Tanto a Él" | Myriam Hernández | |
| February 23 | "Te Pareces Tanto a Él" | Myriam Hernández | |
| March 2 | "Te Pareces Tanto a Él" | Myriam Hernández | |
| March 9 | "Te Pareces Tanto a Él" | Myriam Hernández | |
| March 16 | "Sopa de Caracol" | Banda Blanca | |
| March 23 | "Sopa de Caracol" | Banda Blanca | |
| March 30 | "No Basta" | Franco De Vita | |
| April 6 | "No Basta" | Franco De Vita | |
| April 13 | "No Basta" | Franco De Vita | |
| April 20 | "No Basta" | Franco De Vita | |
| April 27 | "No Basta" | Franco De Vita | |
| May 4 | "No Basta" | Franco De Vita | |
| May 11 | "Mi Deseo" | Los Bukis | |
| May 18 | "Mi Deseo" | Los Bukis | |
| May 25 | "Mi Deseo" | Los Bukis | |
| June 1 | "Mi Deseo" | Los Bukis | |
| June 8 | "Mi Deseo" | Los Bukis | |
| June 15 | "Mi Deseo" | Los Bukis | |
| June 22 | "Todo, Todo, Todo" | Daniela Romo | |
| June 29 | "Todo, Todo, Todo" | Daniela Romo | |
| July 6 | "Todo, Todo, Todo" | Daniela Romo | |
| July 13 | "Todo, Todo, Todo" | Daniela Romo | |
| July 20 | "Todo, Todo, Todo" | Daniela Romo | |
| July 27 | "Todo, Todo, Todo" | Daniela Romo | |
| August 3 | "Todo, Todo, Todo" | Daniela Romo | |
| August 10 | "Todo, Todo, Todo" | Daniela Romo | |
| August 17 | "Todo, Todo, Todo" | Daniela Romo | |
| August 24 | "Todo, Todo, Todo" | Daniela Romo | |
| August 31 | "Cosas del Amor" | Vikki Carr and Ana Gabriel | |
| September 7 | "Cosas del Amor" | Vikki Carr and Ana Gabriel | |
| September 14 | "Cosas del Amor" | Vikki Carr and Ana Gabriel | |
| September 21 | "Cosas del Amor" | Vikki Carr and Ana Gabriel | |
| September 28 | "Cosas del Amor" | Vikki Carr and Ana Gabriel | |
| October 5 | "Cosas del Amor" | Vikki Carr and Ana Gabriel | |
| October 12 | "Cosas del Amor" | Vikki Carr and Ana Gabriel | |
| October 19 | "Cosas del Amor" | Vikki Carr and Ana Gabriel | |
| October 26 | "Cosas del Amor" | Vikki Carr and Ana Gabriel | |
| November 2 | "Cosas del Amor" | Vikki Carr and Ana Gabriel | |
| November 9 | "Por Qué Será" | Rudy La Scala | |
| November 16 | "Por Qué Será" | Rudy La Scala | |
| November 23 | "Amor Mío, ¿Qué Me Has Hecho?" | Camilo Sesto | |
| November 30 | "Amor Mío, ¿Qué Me Has Hecho?" | Camilo Sesto | |
| December 7 | "Amor Mío, ¿Qué Me Has Hecho?" | Camilo Sesto | |
| December 14 | "Amor Mío, ¿Qué Me Has Hecho?" | Camilo Sesto | |
| December 21 | "Amor Mío, ¿Qué Me Has Hecho?" | Camilo Sesto | |
| December 28 | "Amor Mío, ¿Qué Me Has Hecho?" | Camilo Sesto | |
