= List of number-one Billboard Hot Latin Tracks of 2003 =

This is a list containing the Billboard Hot Latin Tracks number-ones of 2003.

Issue date	Song	Artist(s)	Ref.
January 4	"El Problema"	Ricardo Arjona	
January 11	"El Problema"	Ricardo Arjona	
January 18	"El Problema"	Ricardo Arjona	
January 25	"El Problema"	Ricardo Arjona	
February 1	"Así Es La Vida"	Olga Tañón	
February 8	"Así Es La Vida"	Olga Tañón	
February 15	"Sedúceme"	India	
February 22	"Quizás"	Enrique Iglesias	
March 1	"Que Me Quedes Tú"	Shakira	
March 8	"Sedúceme"	India	
March 15	"Sedúceme"	India	
March 22	"Una Vez Más"	Conjunto Primavera	
March 29	"Una Vez Más"	Conjunto Primavera	
April 5	"Una Vez Más"	Conjunto Primavera	
April 12	"Tal Vez"	Ricky Martin	
April 19	"Tal Vez"	Ricky Martin	
April 26	"Tal Vez"	Ricky Martin	
May 3	"Tal Vez"	Ricky Martin	
May 10	"Tal Vez"	Ricky Martin	
May 17	"Tal Vez"	Ricky Martin	
May 24	"Tal Vez"	Ricky Martin	
May 31	"Para Qué La Vida"	Enrique Iglesias	
June 7	"Tal Vez"	Ricky Martin	
June 14	"Tal Vez"	Ricky Martin	
June 21	"Tal Vez"	Ricky Martin	
June 28	"Tal Vez"	Ricky Martin	
July 5	"Mariposa Traicionera"	Maná	
July 12	"Tu Amor o Tu Desprecio"	Marco Antonio Solís	
July 19	"Fotografía"	Juanes featuring Nelly Furtado	
July 26	"Fotografía"	Juanes featuring Nelly Furtado	
August 2	"Casi"	Soraya	
August 9	"Jaleo"	Ricky Martin	
August 16	"Fotografía"	Juanes featuring Nelly Furtado	
August 23	"Fotografía"	Juanes featuring Nelly Furtado	
August 30	"Fotografía"	Juanes featuring Nelly Furtado	
September 6	"Un Siglo Sin Ti"	Chayanne	
September 13	"Antes"	Obie Bermúdez	
September 20	"Antes"	Obie Bermúdez	
September 27	"Antes"	Obie Bermúdez	
October 4	"Hoy"	Gloria Estefan	
October 11	"Hoy"	Gloria Estefan	
October 11	"Hoy"	Gloria Estefan	
October 18	"Antes"	Obie Bermudez	
October 25	"Te Necesito"	Luis Miguel	
November 1	"Hoy"	Gloria Estefan	
November 8	"Hoy"	Gloria Estefan	
November 15	"Te Necesito"	Luis Miguel	
November 22	"Mientes Tan Bien"	Sin Bandera	
November 29	"Mientes Tan Bien"	Sin Bandera	
December 6	"Mientes Tan Bien"	Sin Bandera	
December 13	"Mientes Tan Bien"	Sin Bandera	
December 20	"Mientes Tan Bien"	Sin Bandera	
December 27	"Mientes Tan Bien"	Sin Bandera	
