= List of number-one Billboard Hot Latin Songs of 2005 =

This is a list of the number one songs on the Billboard Hot Latin Tracks in 2005.

Issue date	Song	Artist(s)
January 1	"Nada Valgo Sin Tu Amor"	Juanes
January 8	"Todo el Año"	Obie Bermúdez
January 15	"Todo el Año"	Obie Bermúdez
January 22	"Todo el Año"	Obie Bermúdez
January 29	"Todo el Año"	Obie Bermúdez
February 5	"Volverte a Ver"	Juanes
February 12	"Volverte a Ver"	Juanes
February 19	"Volverte a Ver"	Juanes
February 26	"Hoy Como Ayer"	Conjunto Primavera
March 5	"Aire"	Intocable
March 12	"Aire"	Intocable
March 19	"Hoy Como Ayer"	Conjunto Primavera
March 26	"Hoy Como Ayer"	Conjunto Primavera
April 2	"Aire"	Intocable
April 9	"La Camisa Negra"	Juanes
April 16	"La Camisa Negra"	Juanes
April 23	"La Camisa Negra"	Juanes
April 30	"La Camisa Negra"	Juanes
May 7	"La Camisa Negra"	Juanes
May 14	"La Camisa Negra"	Juanes
May 21	"La Camisa Negra"	Juanes
May 28	"La Camisa Negra"	Juanes
June 4	"La Tortura"	Shakira featuring Alejandro Sanz
June 11	"La Tortura"	Shakira featuring Alejandro Sanz
June 18	"La Camisa Negra"	Juanes
June 25	"La Tortura"	Shakira featuring Alejandro Sanz
July 2	"La Tortura"	Shakira featuring Alejandro Sanz
July 9	"La Tortura"	Shakira featuring Alejandro Sanz
July 16	"La Tortura"	Shakira featuring Alejandro Sanz
July 23	"La Tortura"	Shakira featuring Alejandro Sanz
July 30	"La Tortura"	Shakira featuring Alejandro Sanz
August 6	"La Tortura"	Shakira featuring Alejandro Sanz
August 13	"La Tortura"	Shakira featuring Alejandro Sanz
August 20	"La Tortura"	Shakira featuring Alejandro Sanz
August 27	"Nada Es Para Siempre"	Luis Fonsi
September 3	"La Tortura"	Shakira featuring Alejandro Sanz
September 10	"La Tortura"	Shakira featuring Alejandro Sanz
September 17	"La Tortura"	Shakira featuring Alejandro Sanz
September 24	"La Tortura"	Shakira featuring Alejandro Sanz
October 1	"La Tortura"	Shakira featuring Alejandro Sanz
October 8	"La Tortura"	Shakira featuring Alejandro Sanz
October 15	"La Tortura"	Shakira featuring Alejandro Sanz
October 22	"La Tortura"	Shakira featuring Alejandro Sanz
October 29	"La Tortura"	Shakira featuring Alejandro Sanz
November 5	"La Tortura"	Shakira featuring Alejandro Sanz
November 12	"La Tortura"	Shakira featuring Alejandro Sanz
November 19	"La Tortura"	Shakira featuring Alejandro Sanz
November 26	"La Tortura"	Shakira featuring Alejandro Sanz
December 3	"La Tortura"	Shakira featuring Alejandro Sanz
December 10	"Rompe"	Daddy Yankee
December 17	"Rompe"	Daddy Yankee
December 24	"Amor Eterno"	Cristian Castro
December 31	"Rompe"	Daddy Yankee

== See also ==
- Billboard Hot Latin Tracks
