= List of number-one Billboard Hot Latin Tracks of 1993 =

This is a list containing the Billboard Hot Latin Tracks number-ones of 1993.

Issue date	Song	Artist(s)	Ref.
January 2	"Castillo Azul"	Ricardo Montaner	
January 9	"Castillo Azul"	Ricardo Montaner	
January 16	"Castillo Azul"	Ricardo Montaner	
January 23	"Castillo Azul"	Ricardo Montaner	
January 30	"Castillo Azul"	Ricardo Montaner	
February 6	"Castillo Azul"	Ricardo Montaner	
February 13	"Castillo Azul"	Ricardo Montaner	
February 20	"El Costo de la Vida"	Juan Luis Guerra	
February 27	"Cree En Nuestro Amor"	Jon Secada	
March 6	"Cree En Nuestro Amor"	Jon Secada	
March 13	"Piel Adentro"	Ricardo Montaner	
March 20	"Piel Adentro"	Ricardo Montaner	
March 27	"Piel Adentro"	Ricardo Montaner	
April 3	"Piel Adentro"	Ricardo Montaner	
April 10	"Me Estoy Enamorando"	La Mafia	
April 17	"Me Estoy Enamorando"	La Mafia	
April 24	"Me Estoy Enamorando"	La Mafia	
May 1	"Me Estoy Enamorando"	La Mafia	
May 8	"Me Estoy Enamorando"	La Mafia	
May 15	"Me Estoy Enamorando"	La Mafia	
May 22	"Me Estoy Enamorando"	La Mafia	
May 29	"Me Estoy Enamorando"	La Mafia	
June 5	"Me Estoy Enamorando"	La Mafia	
June 12	"Muchacha Triste"	Los Fantasmas del Caribe	
June 19	"Muchacha Triste"	Los Fantasmas del Caribe	
June 26	"Muchacha Triste"	Los Fantasmas del Caribe	
July 3	"Sentir"	Jon Secada	
July 10	"Sentir"	Jon Secada	
July 17	"Ayer"	Luis Miguel	
July 24	"Ayer"	Luis Miguel	
July 31	"Ayer"	Luis Miguel	
August 7	"Mi Tierra"	Gloria Estefan	
August 14	"Mi Tierra"	Gloria Estefan	
August 21	"Mi Tierra"	Gloria Estefan	
August 28	"Mi Tierra"	Gloria Estefan	
September 4	"Mi Tierra"	Gloria Estefan	
September 11	"Mi Tierra"	Gloria Estefan	
September 18	"Nunca Voy a Olvidarte"	Cristian Castro	
September 25	"Nunca Voy a Olvidarte"	Cristian Castro	
October 2	"Nunca Voy a Olvidarte"	Cristian Castro	
October 9	"Nunca Voy a Olvidarte"	Cristian Castro	
October 16	"Guadalupe"	José Y Durval	
October 23	"Hasta Que Me Olvides"	Luis Miguel	
October 30	"Hasta Que Me Olvides"	Luis Miguel	
November 6	"Hasta Que Me Olvides"	Luis Miguel	
November 13	"Con Los Años Que Me Quedan"	Gloria Estefan	
November 20	"Con Los Años Que Me Quedan"	Gloria Estefan	
November 27	"Con Los Años Que Me Quedan"	Gloria Estefan	
December 4	"Con Los Años Que Me Quedan"	Gloria Estefan	
December 11	"Por Una Lágrima"	Los Fantasmas del Caribe	
December 18	"Cerca De Ti"	Barrio Boyzz	
December 25	"Cerca De Ti"	Barrio Boyzz	

== See also ==
- Billboard Hot Latin Tracks
