= List of number-one Billboard Hot Latin Songs of 2007 =

This is a list containing the Billboard Hot Latin Tracks number-ones of 2007.

Issue date	Song	Artist(s)	Ref
January 6	"Tu Recuerdo"	Ricky Martin featuring La Mari	
January 13	"Bendita Tu Luz"	Maná featuring Juan Luis Guerra	
January 20	"Bendita Tu Luz"	Maná featuring Juan Luis Guerra	
January 27	"Bendita Tu Luz"	Maná featuring Juan Luis Guerra	
February 3	"Sola"	Héctor "El Father"	
February 10	"Sola"	Héctor "El Father"	
February 17	"Sola"	Héctor "El Father"	
February 24	"Tu Amor"	Luis Fonsi	
March 3	"Manda Una Señal"	Maná	
March 10	"Te lo Agradezco, Pero No"	Alejandro Sanz featuring Shakira	
March 17	"Ese"	Conjunto Primavera	
March 24	"Ese"	Conjunto Primavera	
March 31	"La Llave de Mi Corazón"	Juan Luis Guerra y 440	
April 7	"La Llave de Mi Corazón"	Juan Luis Guerra y 440	
April 14	"La Llave de Mi Corazón"	Juan Luis Guerra y 440	
April 21	"La Llave de Mi Corazón"	Juan Luis Guerra y 440	
April 28	"Ese"	Conjunto Primavera	
May 5	"Qué Hiciste"	Jennifer Lopez	
May 12	"Si Nos Quedara Poco Tiempo"	Chayanne	
May 19	"Dímelo"	Enrique Iglesias	
May 26	"Dímelo"	Enrique Iglesias	
June 2	"Dímelo"	Enrique Iglesias	
June 9	"Dímelo"	Enrique Iglesias	
June 16	"Dímelo"	Enrique Iglesias	
June 23	"Dímelo"	Enrique Iglesias	
June 30	"Ojalá"	Marco Antonio Solís	
July 7	"Ojalá"	Marco Antonio Solís	
July 14	"Ojalá"	Marco Antonio Solís	
July 21	"Dímelo"	Enrique Iglesias	
July 28	"Dímelo"	Enrique Iglesias	
August 4	"Dímelo"	Enrique Iglesias	
August 11	"Dímelo"	Enrique Iglesias	
August 18	"Y Si Te Digo"	Fanny Lú	
August 25	"¡Basta Ya!"	Conjunto Primavera	
September 1	"No Llores"	Gloria Estefan	
September 8	"No Llores"	Gloria Estefan	
September 15	"Dímelo"	Enrique Iglesias	
September 22	"No Llores"	Gloria Estefan	
September 29	"Me Enamora"	Juanes	
October 6	"Me Enamora"	Juanes	
October 13	"Me Enamora"	Juanes	
October 20	"Me Enamora"	Juanes	
October 27	"Me Enamora"	Juanes	
November 3	"Me Enamora"	Juanes	
November 10	"Me Enamora"	Juanes	
November 17	"Me Enamora"	Juanes	
November 24	"Me Enamora"	Juanes	
December 1	"Me Enamora"	Juanes	
December 8	"Me Enamora"	Juanes	
December 15	"Me Enamora"	Juanes	
December 22	"Me Enamora"	Juanes	
December 29	"Me Enamora"	Juanes	
