= Billboard Year-End Global 200 singles of 2022 =

Worldwide music chart

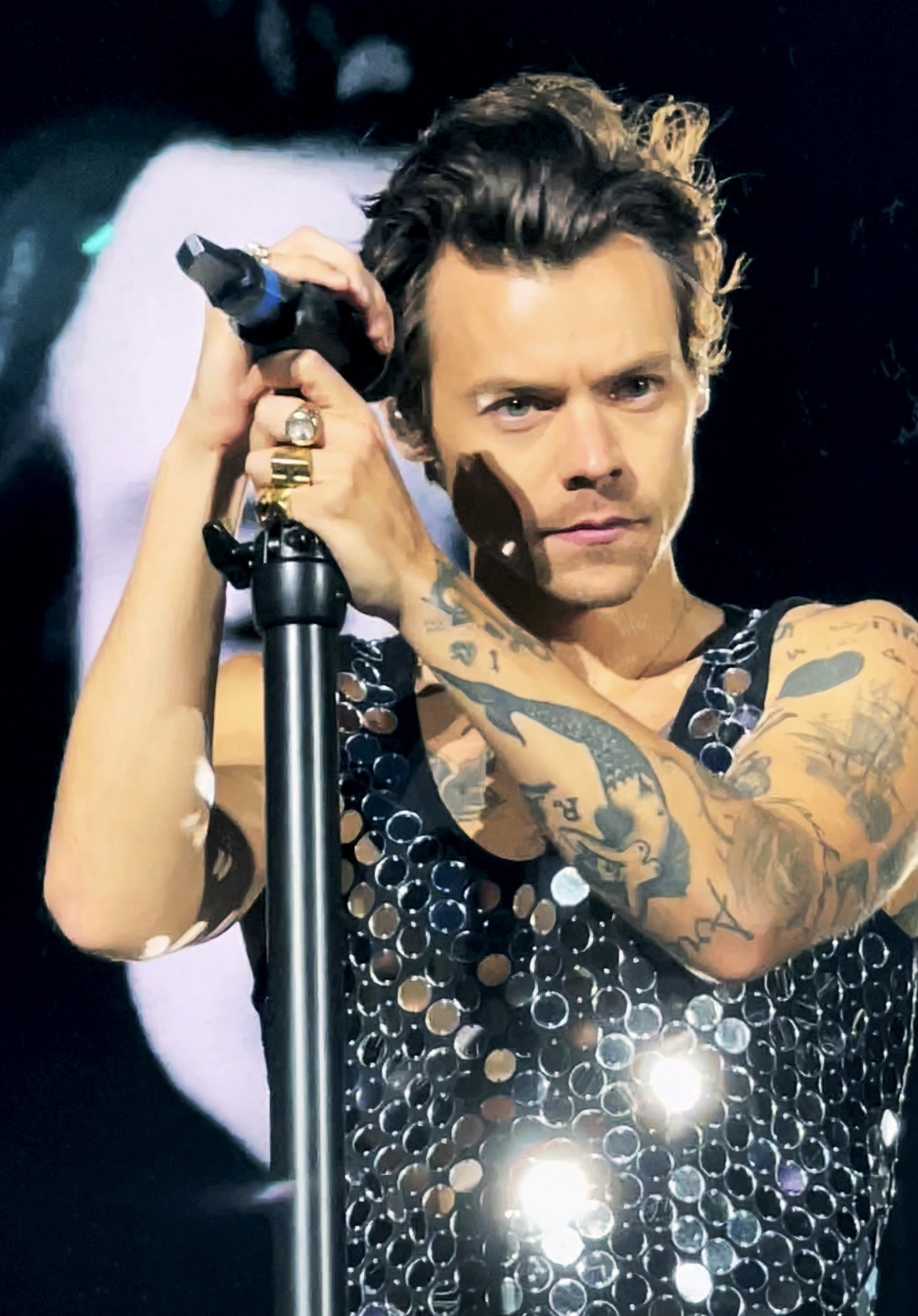
"As It Was" by Harry Styles (pictured) was the number one single of both year-end lists. It spent 15 weeks on top of the Global 200 and 13 weeks on top of the Global 200 Excl. Us, both records.

The Billboard Global 200 and Global Excl. US are charts that ranks the best-performing singles globally and globally excluding the United States, respectively. Its data is published by Billboard weekly and based collectively on each single's weekly physical and digital sales, as well as streaming. At the end of a year, Billboard publishes an annual list of the 200 most successful songs throughout that year on the Global 200 and Global Excl. US charts based on the information. For 2022, its second year, the list was published on December 2, calculated with data from November 20, 2021, to November 12, 2022.

== Year-end list ==
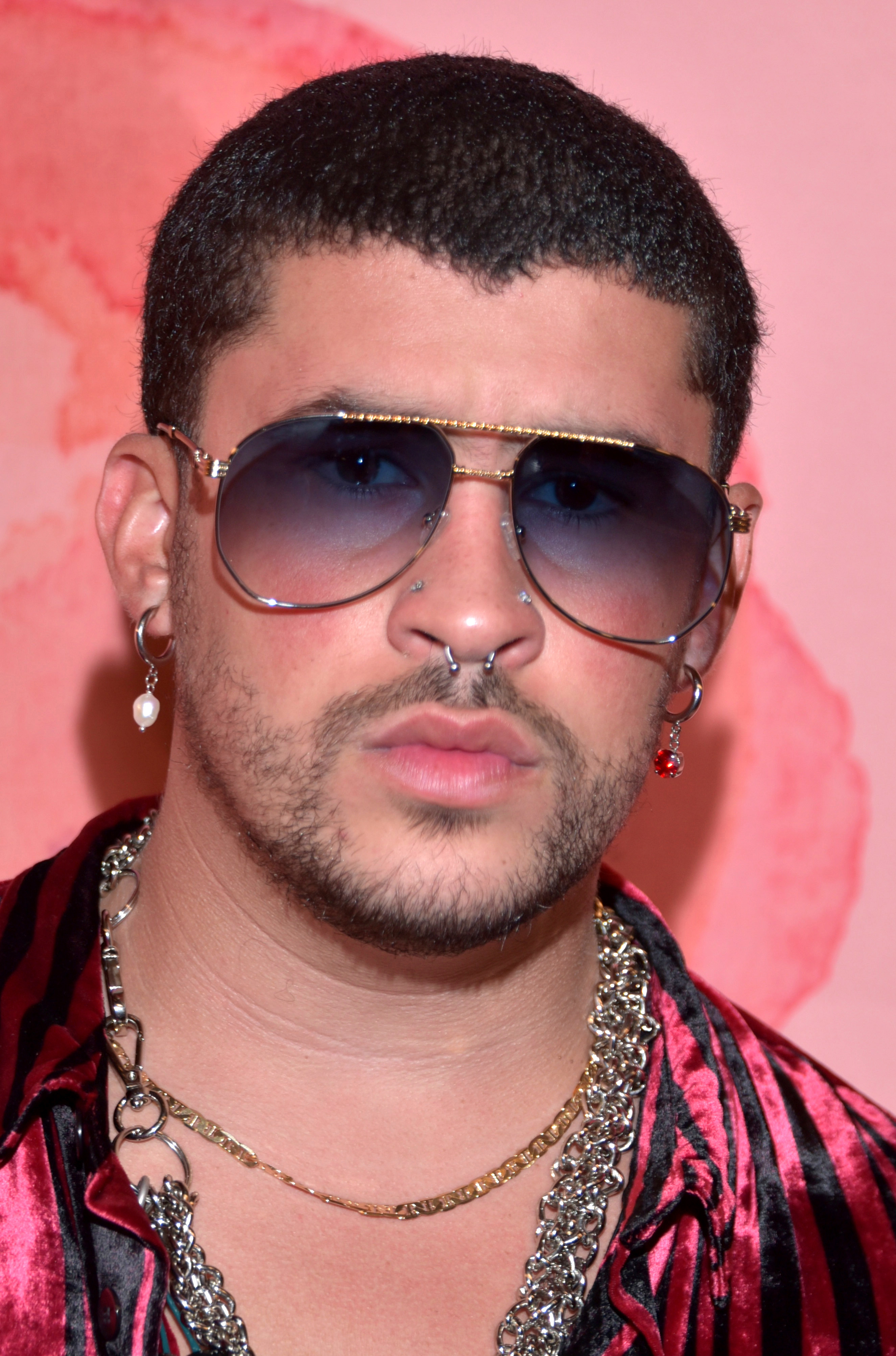
Bad Bunny (pictured) placed twenty songs on the Global 200 year-end list, fifteen of which were from his Un Verano Sin Ti album.

List of songs on Billboard's 2022 Year-End Global 200 charts
No.	Billboard Global 200		Billboard Global Excl. U.S.	
No.	Title	Artist(s)	Title	Artist(s)
1	"As It Was"	Harry Styles	"As It Was"	Harry Styles
2	"Heat Waves"	Glass Animals	"Heat Waves"	Glass Animals
3	"Stay"	The Kid Laroi and Justin Bieber	"Cold Heart (Pnau remix)"	Elton John and Dua Lipa
4	"Cold Heart (Pnau remix)"	Elton John and Dua Lipa	"Stay"	The Kid Laroi and Justin Bieber
5	"Shivers"	Ed Sheeran	"Shivers"	Ed Sheeran
6	"Easy on Me"	Adele	"ABCDEFU"	Gayle
7	"ABCDEFU"	Gayle	"Bad Habits"	Ed Sheeran
8	"Bad Habits"	Ed Sheeran	"Easy on Me"	Adele
9	"Enemy"	Imagine Dragons and JID	"Enemy"	Imagine Dragons and JID
10	"Save Your Tears"	The Weeknd and Ariana Grande	"Save Your Tears"	The Weeknd and Ariana Grande
11	"Me Porto Bonito"	Bad Bunny and Chencho Corleone	"Pepas"	Farruko
12	"Industry Baby"	Lil Nas X and Jack Harlow	"Me Porto Bonito"	Bad Bunny and Chencho Corleone
13	"Tití Me Preguntó"	Bad Bunny	"Industry Baby"	Lil Nas X and Jack Harlow
14	"Levitating"	Dua Lipa	"Love Nwantiti (Ah Ah Ah)"	CKay
15	"Pepas"	Farruko	"Levitating"	Dua Lipa
16	"Blinding Lights"	The Weeknd	"Tití Me Preguntó"	Bad Bunny
17	"Love Nwantiti (Ah Ah Ah)"	CKay	"Blinding Lights"	The Weeknd
18	"Running Up That Hill (A Deal with God)"	Kate Bush	"Where Are You Now"	Lost Frequencies and Calum Scott
19	"Ghost"	Justin Bieber	"My Universe"	Coldplay and BTS
20	"First Class"	Jack Harlow	"Another Love"	Tom Odell
21	"Happier Than Ever"	Billie Eilish	"Bzrp Music Sessions, Vol. 52"	Bizarrap and Quevedo
22	"Woman"	Doja Cat	"Butter"	BTS
23	"Ojitos Lindos"	Bad Bunny and Bomba Estéreo	"Ojitos Lindos"	Bad Bunny and Bomba Estéreo
24	"Where Are You Now"	Lost Frequencies and Calum Scott	"Running Up That Hill (A Deal with God)"	Kate Bush
25	"My Universe"	Coldplay and BTS	"Bam Bam"	Camila Cabello featuring Ed Sheeran
26	"Moscow Mule"	Bad Bunny	"Ghost"	Justin Bieber
27	"Good 4 U"	Olivia Rodrigo	"Dynamite"	BTS
28	"Efecto"	Bad Bunny	"Desesperados"	Rauw Alejandro and Chencho Corleone
29	"Bam Bam"	Camila Cabello featuring Ed Sheeran	"Woman"	Doja Cat
30	"About Damn Time"	Lizzo	"Do It to It"	Acraze featuring Cherish
31	"Perfect"	Ed Sheeran	"Happier Than Ever"	Billie Eilish
32	"Provenza"	Karol G	"The Motto"	Tiësto and Ava Max
33	"Another Love"	Tom Odell	"Provenza"	Karol G
34	"Sweater Weather"	The Neighbourhood	"Perfect"	Ed Sheeran
35	"Bzrp Music Sessions, Vol. 52"	Bizarrap and Quevedo	"Efecto"	Bad Bunny
36	"Mamiii"	Becky G and Karol G	"Moscow Mule"	Bad Bunny
37	"The Motto"	Tiësto and Ava Max	"Middle of the Night"	Elley Duhé
38	"Butter"	BTS	"Mamiii"	Becky G and Karol G
39	"Kiss Me More"	Doja Cat featuring SZA	"Shape of You"	Ed Sheeran
40	"Dynamite"	BTS	"Good 4 U"	Olivia Rodrigo
41	"Desesperados"	Rauw Alejandro and Chencho Corleone	"Love Tonight"	Shouse
42	"We Don't Talk About Bruno"	Carolina Gaitán, Mauro Castillo, Adassa, Rhenzy Feliz, Diane Guerrero, Stephanie Beatriz and the Encanto cast	"Sweater Weather"	The Neighbourhood
43	"I Ain't Worried"	OneRepublic	"I Ain't Worried"	OneRepublic
44	"Wait for U"	Future featuring Drake and Tems	"Watermelon Sugar"	Harry Styles
45	"Believer"	Imagine Dragons	"Envolver"	Anitta
46	"Watermelon Sugar"	Harry Styles	"Believer"	Imagine Dragons
47	"Sunflower"	Post Malone and Swae Lee	"Infinity"	Jaymes Young
48	"Shape of You"	Ed Sheeran	"Beggin'"	Måneskin
49	"Thats What I Want"	Lil Nas X	"About Damn Time"	Lizzo
50	"Glimpse of Us"	Joji	"Baby Shark"	Pinkfong
51	"Do It to It"	Acraze featuring Cherish	"Thats What I Want"	Lil Nas X
52	"Baby Shark"	Pinkfong	"Dance Monkey"	Tones and I
53	"Dance Monkey"	Tones and I	"Someone You Loved"	Lewis Capaldi
54	"Someone You Loved"	Lewis Capaldi	"Yonaguni"	Bad Bunny
55	"Yonaguni"	Bad Bunny	"Glimpse of Us"	Joji
56	"Middle of the Night"	Elley Duhé	"La Bachata"	Manuel Turizo
57	"All Too Well (Taylor's Version)"	Taylor Swift	"Te Felicito"	Shakira and Rauw Alejandro
58	"Traitor"	Olivia Rodrigo	"Peaches"	Justin Bieber featuring Daniel Caesar and Giveon
59	"Party"	Bad Bunny and Rauw Alejandro	"Without Me"	Eminem
60	"Drivers License"	Olivia Rodrigo	"First Class"	Jack Harlow
61	"Dakiti"	Bad Bunny and Jhay Cortez	"Kiss Me More"	Doja Cat featuring SZA
62	"Late Night Talking"	Harry Styles	"Don't Start Now"	Dua Lipa
63	"Without Me"	Eminem	"Shallow"	Lady Gaga and Bradley Cooper
64	"Need to Know"	Doja Cat	"Pink Venom"	Blackpink
65	"Peaches"	Justin Bieber featuring Daniel Caesar and Giveon	"Dandelions"	Ruth B.
66	"Don't Start Now"	Dua Lipa	"Una Noche en Medellin"	Cris Mj
67	"Shallow"	Lady Gaga and Bradley Cooper	"Drivers License"	Olivia Rodrigo
68	"Envolver"	Anitta	"Lo Siento BB:/"	Tainy, Bad Bunny and Julieta Venegas
69	"Dandelions"	Ruth B.	"Yellow"	Coldplay
70	"Beggin'"	Måneskin	"Lovely"	Billie Eilish and Khalid
71	"Tarot"	Bad Bunny and Jhay Cortez	"Despechá"	Rosalía
72	"Circles"	Post Malone	"Gangsta's Paradise"	Coolio featuring L.V.
73	"Lovely"	Billie Eilish and Khalid	"Ultra Solo"	Polimá Westcoast featuring Pailita
74	"Yellow"	Coldplay	"Counting Stars"	OneRepublic
75	"Bohemian Rhapsody"	Queen	"I'm Good (Blue)"	David Guetta and Bebe Rexha
76	"Bones"	Imagine Dragons	"Tacones Rojos"	Sebastián Yatra
77	"Super Gremlin"	Kodak Black	"Sunflower"	Post Malone and Swae Lee
78	"Lo Siento BB:/"	Tainy, Bad Bunny and Julieta Venegas	"Calm Down"	Rema and Selena Gomez
79	"Gangsta's Paradise"	Coolio featuring L.V.	"Bones"	Imagine Dragons
80	"Bad Habit"	Steve Lacy	"Party"	Bad Bunny and Rauw Alejandro
81	"Jimmy Cooks"	Drake featuring 21 Savage	"Late Night Talking"	Harry Styles
82	"Te Felicito"	Shakira and Rauw Alejandro	"Something Just Like This"	The Chainsmokers and Coldplay
83	"Love Tonight"	Shouse	"Montero (Call Me by Your Name)"	Lil Nas X
84	"Infinity"	Jaymes Young	"Tarot"	Bad Bunny and Jhay Cortez
85	"Montero (Call Me by Your Name)"	Lil Nas X	"Unstoppable"	Sia
86	"Smells Like Teen Spirit"	Nirvana	"Traitor"	Olivia Rodrigo
87	"I Like You (A Happier Song)"	Post Malone featuring Doja Cat	"Left and Right"	Charlie Puth featuring Jungkook
88	"All I Want for Christmas Is You"	Mariah Carey	"Peru"	Fireboy DML and Ed Sheeran
89	"Counting Stars"	OneRepublic	"Bohemian Rhapsody"	Queen
90	"La Bachata"	Manuel Turizo	"Under the Influence"	Chris Brown
91	"One Right Now"	Post Malone and The Weeknd	"Every Breath You Take"	The Police
92	"Something Just Like This"	The Chainsmokers and Coldplay	"Snap"	Rosa Linn
93	"I'm Good (Blue)"	David Guetta and Bebe Rexha	"Unholy"	Sam Smith and Kim Petras
94	"Pink Venom"	Blackpink	"Permission to Dance"	BTS
95	"Under the Influence"	Chris Brown	"Light Switch"	Charlie Puth
96	"Neverita"	Bad Bunny	"Neverita"	Bad Bunny
97	"No Role Modelz"	J. Cole	"Love Dive"	Ive
98	"Unholy"	Sam Smith and Kim Petras	"Ferrari"	James Hype and Miggy Dela Rosa
99	"Break My Soul"	Beyoncé	"Money"	Lisa
100	"Starboy"	The Weeknd featuring Daft Punk	"All Too Well (Taylor's Version)"	Taylor Swift
101	"Dreams"	Fleetwood Mac	"Mon Amour"	Zzolio
102	"Peru"	Fireboy DML and Ed Sheeran	"Todo de Ti"	Rauw Alejandro
103	"Die for You"	The Weeknd	"Oh My God"	Adele
104	"Despechá"	Rosalía	"Moth to a Flame"	Swedish House Mafia and The Weeknd
105	"Bad Guy"	Billie Eilish	"Smells Like Teen Spirit"	Nirvana
106	"Left and Right"	Charlie Puth featuring Jungkook	"All I Want for Christmas Is You"	Mariah Carey
107	"Después de la Playa"	Bad Bunny	"Entre Nosotros"	Tiago PZK, Lit Killah, Nicki Nicole and María Becerra
108	"Sunroof"	Nicky Youre and Dazy	"Zankyosanka"	Aimer
109	"Leave the Door Open"	Silk Sonic (Bruno Mars and Anderson .Paak)	"Until I Found You"	Stephen Sanchez
110	"Oh My God"	Adele	"Take On Me"	A-ha
111	"Light Switch"	Charlie Puth	"Despacito"	Luis Fonsi and Daddy Yankee featuring Justin Bieber
112	"Deja Vu"	Olivia Rodrigo	"The Real Slim Shady"	Eminem
113	"Take Me to Church"	Hozier	"Mixed Nuts"	Official Hige Dandism
114	"Sweet Child o' Mine"	Guns N' Roses	"Wake Me Up"	Avicii
115	"Unstoppable"	Sia	"Bad Guy"	Billie Eilish
116	"Riptide"	Vance Joy	"Take Me to Church"	Hozier
117	"The Real Slim Shady"	Eminem	"Riptide"	Vance Joy
118	"Mr. Brightside"	The Killers	"Need to Know"	Doja Cat
119	"Big Energy"	Latto	"One Kiss"	Calvin Harris Dua Lipa
120	"Lose Yourself"	Eminem	"New Genesis"	Ado
121	"La Corriente"	Bad Bunny and Tony Dize	"There's Nothing Holdin' Me Back"	Shawn Mendes
122	"Until I Found You"	Stephen Sanchez	"I Like You (A Happier Song)"	Post Malone featuring Doja Cat
123	"Una Noche en Medellin"	Cris Mj	"Break My Soul"	Beyoncé
124	"Calm Down"	Rema and Selena Gomez	"Sunroof"	Nicky Youre and Dazy
125	"Surface Pressure"	Jessica Darrow	"La Corriente"	Bad Bunny and Tony Dize
126	"Super Freaky Girl"	Nicki Minaj	"2step"	Ed Sheeran featuring Lil Baby
127	"Astronaut in the Ocean"	Masked Wolf	"Cheap Thrills"	Sia featuring Sean Paul
128	"Vegas"	Doja Cat	"We Don't Talk About Bruno"	Carolina Gaitán, Mauro Castillo, Adassa, Rhenzy Feliz, Diane Guerrero, Stephanie Beatriz and the Encanto cast
129	"Ultra Solo"	Polimá Westcoast featuring Pailita	"W / X / Y"	Tani Yuuki
130	"Something in the Orange"	Zach Bryan	"The Feels"	Twice
131	"In da Club"	50 Cent	"Señorita"	Shawn Mendes and Camila Cabello
132	"Hotel California"	Eagles	"Only Love Can Hurt Like This"	Paloma Faith
133	"Snap"	Rosa Linn	"Shut Down"	Blackpink
134	"505"	Arctic Monkeys	"Doja"	Central Cee
135	"You Proof"	Morgan Wallen	"Toxic"	BoyWithUke
136	"Knife Talk"	Drake featuring 21 Savage and Project Pat	"Medallo"	Blessd, Justin Quiles and Lenny Tavárez
137	"Un Ratito"	Bad Bunny	"In da Club"	50 Cent
138	"Last Christmas"	Wham!	"Starboy"	The Weeknd featuring Daft Punk
139	"Take On Me"	A-ha	"Last Christmas"	Wham!
140	"You Right"	Doja Cat and The Weeknd	"Crazy What Love Can Do"	David Guetta,
141	"Meet Me at Our Spot"	The Anxiety: Willow and Tyler Cole	"Overpass Graffiti"	Ed Sheeran
142	"Moth to a Flame"	Swedish House Mafia and The Weeknd	"One Right Now"	Post Malone and The Weeknd
143	"Don't Stop Believin'"	Journey	"Dakiti"	Bad Bunny and Jhay Cortez
144	"She's All I Wanna Be"	Tate McRae	"Fuera del Mercado"	Danny Ocean
145	"Boyfriend"	Dove Cameron	"Sweet Child o' Mine"	Guns N' Roses
146	"Pushin P"	Gunna and Future featuring Young Thug	"Hold My Hand"	Lady Gaga
147	"I Love You So"	The Walters	"The Nights"	Avicii
148	"Thunderstruck"	AC/DC	"Last Last"	Burna Boy
149	"Mood"	24kGoldn featuring Iann Dior	"Después de la Playa"	Bad Bunny
150	"Smokin out the Window"	Silk Sonic (Bruno Mars and Anderson .Paak)	"Jordan"	Ryan Castro
151	"2step"	Ed Sheeran featuring Lil Baby	"Locked Out of Heaven"	Bruno Mars
152	"One Kiss"	Calvin Harris Dua Lipa	"Deja Vu"	Olivia Rodrigo
153	"Despacito"	Luis Fonsi and Daddy Yankee featuring Justin Bieber	"Do I Wanna Know?"	Arctic Monkeys
154	"Closer"	The Chainsmokers featuring Halsey	"Leave the Door Open"	Silk Sonic (Bruno Mars and Anderson .Paak)
155	"Rockin' Around the Christmas Tree"	Brenda Lee	"Betelgeuse"	Yuuri
156	"Last Last"	Burna Boy	"Jimmy Cooks"	Drake featuring 21 Savage
157	"Money"	Lisa	"Bad Habit"	Steve Lacy
158	"Ferrari"	James Hype and Miggy Dela Rosa	"Where Did You Go?"	Jax Jones featuring MNEK
159	"Todo de Ti"	Rauw Alejandro	"She's All I Wanna Be"	Tate McRae
160	"Love Dive"	Ive	"La Fama (song)"	Rosalía featuring The Weeknd
161	"There's Nothing Holdin' Me Back"	Shawn Mendes	"Un Ratito"	Bad Bunny
162	"Wasted on You"	Morgan Wallen	"Closer"	The Chainsmokers featuring Halsey
163	"The Kind of Love We Make"	Luke Combs	"Boyfriend"	Dove Cameron
164	"Cuff It"	Beyoncé	"Super Freaky Girl"	Nicki Minaj
165	"Fingers Crossed"	Lauren Spencer-Smith	"Belly Dancer"	Imanbek and Byor
166	"Toxic"	BoyWithUke	"Die for You"	The Weeknd
167	"Jingle Bell Rock"	Bobby Helms	"Mood"	24kGoldn featuring Iann Dior
168	"Only Love Can Hurt Like This"	Paloma Faith	"Volví"	Aventura and Bad Bunny
169	"I Hate U"	SZA	"Ojos Marrones"	Lasso
170	"Every Breath You Take"	The Police	"Don't Be Shy"	Tiësto and Karol G
171	"Un Coco"	Bad Bunny	"Eleven"	Ive
172	"Fancy Like"	Walker Hayes	"Pop!"	Nayeon
173	"Andrea"	Bad Bunny and Buscabulla	"Malvadao 3"	Xamã, Gustah and Neo Beats
174	"La Canción"	J Balvin and Bad Bunny	"Acapulco"	Jason Derulo
175	"Permission to Dance"	BTS	"Take My Breath"	The Weeknd
176	"The Hills"	The Weeknd	"Andrea"	Bad Bunny and Buscabulla
177	"Doja"	Central Cee	"Vegas"	Doja Cat
178	"Hold My Hand"	Lady Gaga	"Habit"	Sekai no Owari
179	"Volví"	Aventura and Bad Bunny	"The Business"	Tiësto
180	"Shut Down"	Blackpink	"I Love You So"	The Walters
181	"Take My Breath"	The Weeknd	"Wait for U"	Future featuring Drake and Tems
182	"Dos Mil 16"	Bad Bunny	"Rolling in the Deep"	Adele
183	"Tacones Rojos"	Sebastián Yatra	"Astronaut in the Ocean"	Masked Wolf
184	"Better Days"	Neiked, Mae Muller and Polo G	"La Llevo Al Cielo"	Chris Jedi, Chencho Corleone, Anuel AA and Ñengo Flow
185	"Numb"	Marshmello and Khalid	"Yoru ni Kakeru"	Yoasobi
186	"Sweetest Pie"	Megan Thee Stallion and Dua Lipa	"Sacrifice"	The Weeknd
187	"Mon Amour"	Zzolio	"Yet to Come (The Most Beautiful Moment)"	BTS
188	"Yo No Soy Celoso"	Bad Bunny	"Un Coco"	Bad Bunny
189	"Rock and a Hard Place"	Bailey Zimmerman	"Wellerman"	Nathan Evans
190	"Sacrifice"	The Weeknd	"After Like"	Ive
191	"Medallo"	Blessd, Justin Quiles and Lenny Tavárez	"Fearless"	Le Sserafim
192	"Dos Oruguitas"	Sebastián Yatra	"Afraid to Feel"	LF System
193	"Santa Tell Me"	Ariana Grande	"Payphone"	Maroon 5 featuring Wiz Khalifa
194	"Zankyosanka"	Aimer	"Hype Boy"	NewJeans
195	"Wait a Minute!"	Willow	"Don't You Worry"	Black Eyed Peas, Shakira and David Guetta
196	"Thunder"	Imagine Dragons	"Dos Mil 16"	Bad Bunny
197	"Billie Jean"	Michael Jackson	"Someone like You"	Adele
198	"The Family Madrigal"	Stephanie Beatriz, Olga Merediz and the Encanto cast	"That That"	Psy featuring Suga
199	"It's Beginning to Look a Lot Like Christmas"	Michael Bublé	"Can't Hold Us"	Macklemore & Ryan Lewis featuring Ray Dalton
200	"Get Into It (Yuh)"	Doja Cat	"Numb"	Marshmello and Khalid

== See also ==
- 2022 in music
- List of Billboard Global 200 number ones of 2022
