= List of Billboard Global 200 top-ten singles in 2022 =

This is a list of singles that charted in the top ten of the Billboard Global 200, an all-genre singles chart, in 2022.

== Top-ten singles ==
Key

- ↑ – indicates single's top 10 entry was also its Global 200 debut
- † – indicates Best performing song of the year
- (#) – 2022 Year-end top 10 single position and rank

List of Billboard Global 200 top ten singles that peaked in 2022
| Top ten entry date | Single | Artist(s) | Peak | Peak date | Weeks in top ten | Ref. |
Singles from 2021
| September 25 | "Heat Waves"^{[C]}^{[N]} (#2) | Glass Animals | 1 | March 5 | 32 | |
| October 16 | "Cold Heart (Pnau Remix)"^{[C]} (#4) | Elton John and Dua Lipa | 3 | January 15 | 29 | |
| December 11 | "abcdefu" (#7) | Gayle | 1 | January 15 | 22 | |
Singles from 2022
| January 15 | "Enemy" (#9) | Imagine Dragons and JID | 3 | March 19 | 17 | |
| January 22 | "Sacrifice" ↑ | The Weeknd | 2 | January 22 | 2 | |
| January 22 | "We Don't Talk About Bruno" | Carolina Gaitán, Mauro Castillo, Adassa, Rhenzy Feliz, Diane Guerrero, Stephanie Beatriz and the Encanto cast | 1 | February 12 | 10 | |
| February 5 | "Surface Pressure" | Jessica Darrow | 9 | February 5 | 3 | |
| February 5 | "Pushin P" | Gunna and Future featuring Young Thug | 10 | February 5 | 1 | |
| February 19 | "Do We Have a Problem?" ↑ | Nicki Minaj and Lil Baby | 7 | February 19 | 1 | |
| February 26 | "Mamiii" ↑ | Becky G and Karol G | 4 | March 5 | 7 | |
| February 26 | "The Joker and the Queen" | Ed Sheeran featuring Taylor Swift | 10 | February 26 | 1 | |
| March 19 | "Bam Bam"^{[I]} ↑ | Camila Cabello featuring Ed Sheeran | 5 | May 7 | 5 | |
| April 2 | "Envolver" | Anitta | 2 | April 9 | 5 | |
| April 9 | "Plan A" | Paulo Londra | 8 | April 9 | 1 | |
| April 16 | "As It Was"^{[U]} ↑ † (#1) | Harry Styles | 1 | April 16 | 41 | |
| April 16 | "Still Life" ↑ | BigBang | 9 | April 16 | 1 | |
| April 23 | "First Class" ↑ | Jack Harlow | 2 | April 23 | 9 | |
| May 14 | "Wait for U"^{[K]} ↑ | Future featuring Drake and Tems | 2 | May 14 | 3 | |
| May 14 | "That That" ↑ | Psy featuring Suga | 5 | May 14 | 1 | |
| May 14 | "Provenza"^{[L]} | Karol G | 6 | May 14 | 2 | |
| May 14 | "Puffin on Zootiez" ↑ | Future | 7 | May 14 | 1 | |
| May 21 | "Moscow Mule" ↑ | Bad Bunny | 2 | May 21 | 6 | |
| May 21 | "Me Porto Bonito" ↑ | Bad Bunny and Chencho Corleone | 2 | June 11 | 24 | |
| May 21 | "Titi Me Pregunto" ↑ | Bad Bunny | 4 | June 11 | 27 | |
| May 21 | "Ojitos Lindos" ↑ | Bad Bunny and Bomba Estereo | 4 | June 4 | 13 | |
| May 21 | "Despues de la Playa" ↑ | Bad Bunny | 7 | May 21 | 1 | |
| May 21 | "Party" ↑ | Bad Bunny and Rauw Alejandro | 8 | May 21 | 1 | |
| May 21 | "Tarot" ↑ | Bad Bunny and Jhay Cortez | 9 | May 21 | 1 | |
| May 28 | "N95" ↑ | Kendrick Lamar | 2 | May 28 | 1 | |
| May 28 | "Die Hard" ↑ | Kendrick Lamar, Blxst and Amanda Reifer | 7 | May 28 | 1 | |
| May 28 | "United in Grief" ↑ | Kendrick Lamar | 9 | May 28 | 1 | |
| May 28 | "About Damn Time"^{[K]}^{[O]} | Lizzo | 6 | June 18 | 6 | |
| June 4 | "Late Night Talking" ↑ | Harry Styles | 2 | June 4 | 2 | |
| June 4 | "Music for a Sushi Restaurant" ↑ | Harry Styles | 5 | June 4 | 1 | |
| June 4 | "Matilda" ↑ | Harry Styles | 6 | June 4 | 1 | |
| June 4 | "Little Freak" ↑ | Harry Styles | 10 | June 4 | 1 | |
| June 11 | "Running Up That Hill (A Deal with God)" ↑ | Kate Bush | 1 | June 18 | 13 | |
| June 18 | "I Like You (A Happier Song)" ↑ | Post Malone featuring Doja Cat | 7 | June 18 | 1 | |
| June 25 | "Yet to Come" ↑ | BTS | 2 | June 25 | 1 | |
| June 25 | "Glimpse of Us" ↑ | Joji | 2 | July 2 | 8 | |
| June 25 | "Efecto"^{[M]} | Bad Bunny | 7 | August 6 | 11 | |
| July 2 | "Jimmy Cooks" ↑ | Drake featuring 21 Savage | 3 | July 2 | 3 | |
| July 2 | "Falling Back" ↑ | Drake | 7 | July 2 | 1 | |
| July 2 | "Sticky" ↑ | Drake | 8 | July 2 | 1 | |
| July 2 | "Massive" ↑ | Drake | 10 | July 2 | 1 | |
| July 9 | "Left and Right" ↑ | Charlie Puth featuring Jungkook | 5 | July 9 | 2 | |
| July 9 | "Break My Soul"^{[P]} | Beyonce | 6 | August 13 | 3 | |
| July 23 | "Bzrp Music Sessions, Vol. 52" ↑ | Bizarrap and Quevedo | 1 | July 30 | 14 | |
| August 6 | "I Ain't Worried"^{[Q]} | OneRepublic | 5 | October 8 | 11 | |
| August 13 | "Despecha" ↑ | Rosalía | 6 | August 27 | 6 | |
| August 20 | "Bad Decisions" ↑ | Benny Blanco, BTS and Snoop Dogg | 6 | August 20 | 1 | |
| August 20 | "Staying Alive" ↑ | DJ Khaled featuring Drake and Lil Baby | 10 | August 20 | 1 | |
| August 27 | "Super Freaky Girl" ↑ | Nicki Minaj | 5 | August 27 | 6 | |
| August 27 | "Bad Habit"^{[S]} | Steve Lacy | 8 | October 29 | 3 | |
| September 3 | "Pink Venom" ↑ | Blackpink | 1 | September 3 | 6 | |
| September 10 | "Hold Me Closer" ↑ | Elton John and Britney Spears | 6 | September 10 | 1 | |
| September 17 | "I'm Good (Blue)"^{[T]}^{[U]} | David Guetta and Bebe Rexha | 2 | September 24 | 19 | |
| September 17 | "La Bachata"^{[R]}^{[U]} | Manuel Turizo | 6 | October 22 | 6 | |
| September 24 | "Under the Influence"^{[U]} | Chris Brown | 3 | October 29 | 8 | |
| October 1 | "Shut Down" ↑ | Blackpink | 1 | October 1 | 3 | |
| October 8 | "Unholy" ↑ | Sam Smith and Kim Petras | 1 | October 8 | 23 | |
| November 5 | "Anti-Hero" ↑ | Taylor Swift | 1 | November 5 | 14 | |
| November 5 | "Lavender Haze" ↑ | Taylor Swift | 2 | November 5 | 2 | |
| November 5 | "Snow on the Beach" ↑ | Taylor Swift featuring Lana Del Rey | 3 | November 5 | 2 | |
| November 5 | "Maroon" ↑ | Taylor Swift | 4 | November 5 | 2 | |
| November 5 | "Midnight Rain" ↑ | Taylor Swift | 5 | November 5 | 2 | |
| November 5 | "You're on Your Own, Kid" ↑ | Taylor Swift | 7 | November 5 | 1 | |
| November 5 | "Bejeweled" ↑ | Taylor Swift | 8 | November 5 | 2 | |
| November 5 | "Vigilante Shit" ↑ | Taylor Swift | 9 | November 5 | 1 | |
| November 12 | "Lift Me Up"^{[U]} ↑ | Rihanna | 3 | November 12 | 2 | |
| November 12 | "The Astronaut" ↑ | Jin | 10 | November 12 | 1 | |
| November 19 | "Rich Flex" ↑ | Drake and 21 Savage | 1 | November 19 | 4 | |
| November 19 | "Major Distribution" ↑ | Drake and 21 Savage | 3 | November 19 | 1 | |
| November 19 | "On BS" ↑ | Drake and 21 Savage | 5 | November 19 | 1 | |
| November 19 | "Pussy & Millions" ↑ | Drake and 21 Savage featuring Travis Scott | 6 | November 19 | 1 | |
| November 19 | "Spin Bout U" ↑ | Drake and 21 Savage | 7 | November 19 | 1 | |
| November 19 | "Circo Loco" ↑ | Drake and 21 Savage | 8 | November 19 | 1 | |
| November 19 | "Privileged Rappers" ↑ | Drake and 21 Savage | 9 | November 19 | 1 | |
| November 19 | "BackOutsideBoyz" ↑ | Drake | 10 | November 19 | 1 | |
| November 26 | "Made You Look" | Meghan Trainor | 6 | December 3 | 3 | |
| December 3 | "Dreamers" ↑ | Jungkook | 9 | December 3 | 1 | |
| December 17 | "Creepin'" ↑ | Metro Boomin, The Weeknd and 21 Savage | 3 | December 17 | 13 | |
| December 17 | "Superhero (Heroes & Villains)" ↑ | Metro Boomin, Future and Chris Brown | 8 | December 17 | 1 | |

=== 2021 peaks ===
List of Billboard Global 200 top ten singles in 2022 that peaked in 2021
| Top ten entry date | Single | Artist(s) | Peak | Peak date | Weeks in top ten | Ref. |
|---|---|---|---|---|---|---|
| January 30 | "Save Your Tears"^{[H]}^{[J]} (#10) | The Weeknd | 1 | May 8 | 35 | |
| July 10 | "Bad Habits"^{[C]}^{[G]} ↑ (#8) | Ed Sheeran | 1 | July 31 | 30 | |
| July 24 | "Stay" ↑ (#3) | The Kid Laroi and Justin Bieber | 1 | August 7 | 43 | |
| August 7 | "Industry Baby"^{[C]}^{[E]}^{[F]} ↑ | Lil Nas X and Jack Harlow | 2 | October 2 | 22 | |
| August 21 | "Take My Breath"^{[D]} ↑ | The Weeknd^{1} | 5 | August 21 | 2 | |
| August 28 | "Pepas"^{[C]} | Farruko | 7 | September 4 | 10 | |
| September 25 | "Shivers"^{[C]} ↑ (#5) | Ed Sheeran | 3 | November 13 | 31 | |
| October 30 | "Easy on Me" (#6) | Adele | 1 | October 30 | 20 | |

=== 2023 peaks ===
List of Billboard Global 200 top ten singles in 2022 that peaked in 2023
| Top ten entry date | Single | Artist(s) | Peak | Peak date | Weeks in top ten | Ref. |
|---|---|---|---|---|---|---|
| October 29 | "Calm Down"^{[U]} | Rema and Selena Gomez | 3 | January 21 | 33 | |
| November 5 | "Karma" ↑ | Taylor Swift featuring Ice Spice | 6 | June 10 | 2 | |
| December 24 | "Kill Bill" ↑ | SZA | 1 | January 14 | 21 | |

=== Holiday season ===
Recurring holiday titles, appearing in the Billboard Global 200 top ten in previous holiday seasons
| Top ten entry date | Single | Artist(s) | Peak | Peak date | Weeks in top ten | Ref. |
|---|---|---|---|---|---|---|
| December 12, 2020 | "All I Want for Christmas Is You"^{[V]} | Mariah Carey | 1 | December 19, 2020 | 33 | |
| December 12, 2020 | "Last Christmas"^{[W]} | Wham! | 1 | December 20, 2025 | 30 | |
| December 12, 2020 | "Rockin' Around the Christmas Tree"^{[W]} | Brenda Lee | 2 | December 24, 2022 | 27 | |
| December 19, 2020 | "Jingle Bell Rock"^{[W]} | Bobby Helms | 4 | January 2, 2021 | 26 | |
| December 19, 2020 | "It's Beginning to Look a Lot Like Christmas"^{[A]}^{[X]} | Michael Buble | 6 | January 2, 2021 | 14 | |
| December 26, 2020 | "Santa Tell Me"^{[X]} | Ariana Grande | 5 | January 2, 2021 | 20 | |
| January 2, 2021 | "It's the Most Wonderful Time of the Year"^{[A]}^{[Y]} | Andy Williams | 7 | January 2, 2021 | 11 | |
| January 2, 2021 | "Feliz Navidad"^{[B]}^{[Z]} | Jose Feliciano | 5 | January 7, 2023 | 7 | |

== Notes ==
^{1} The Weeknd's "Take My Breath" re-entered the top ten at number 10 on January 22, 2022 upon the release of its parent album Dawn FM. The Dawn FM album version of "Take My Breath" is an extended version of the song.

^{A} The single re-entered the top ten on the week ending January 1, 2022.
^{B} The single re-entered the top ten on the week ending January 8, 2022.
^{C} The single re-entered the top ten on the week ending January 15, 2022.
^{D} The single re-entered the top ten on the week ending January 22, 2022.
^{E} The single re-entered the top ten on the week ending January 29, 2022.
^{F} The single re-entered the top ten on the week ending February 12, 2022.
^{G} The single re-entered the top ten on the week ending March 5, 2022.
^{H} The single re-entered the top ten on the week ending March 26, 2022.
^{I} The single re-entered the top ten on the week ending April 23, 2022.
^{J} The single re-entered the top ten on the week ending May 7, 2022.
^{K} The single re-entered the top ten on the week ending June 11, 2022.
^{L} The single re-entered the top ten on the week ending June 18, 2022.
^{M} The single re-entered the top ten on the week ending July 9, 2022.
^{N} The single re-entered the top ten on the week ending July 16, 2022.
^{O} The single re-entered the top ten on the week ending July 23, 2022.
^{P} The single re-entered the top ten on the week ending August 13, 2022.
^{Q} The single re-entered the top ten on the week ending August 27, 2022.
^{R} The single re-entered the top ten on the week ending October 15, 2022.
^{S} The single re-entered the top ten on the week ending October 22, 2022.
^{T} The single re-entered the top ten on the week ending November 12, 2022.
^{U} The single re-entered the top ten on the week ending November 26, 2022.
^{V} The single re-entered the top ten on the week ending December 3, 2022.
^{W} The single re-entered the top ten on the week ending December 10, 2022.
^{X} The single re-entered the top ten on the week ending December 17, 2022.
^{Y} The single re-entered the top ten on the week ending December 24, 2022.
^{Z} The single re-entered the top ten on the week ending December 31, 2022.
