= List of Billboard Global 200 number ones of 2022 =

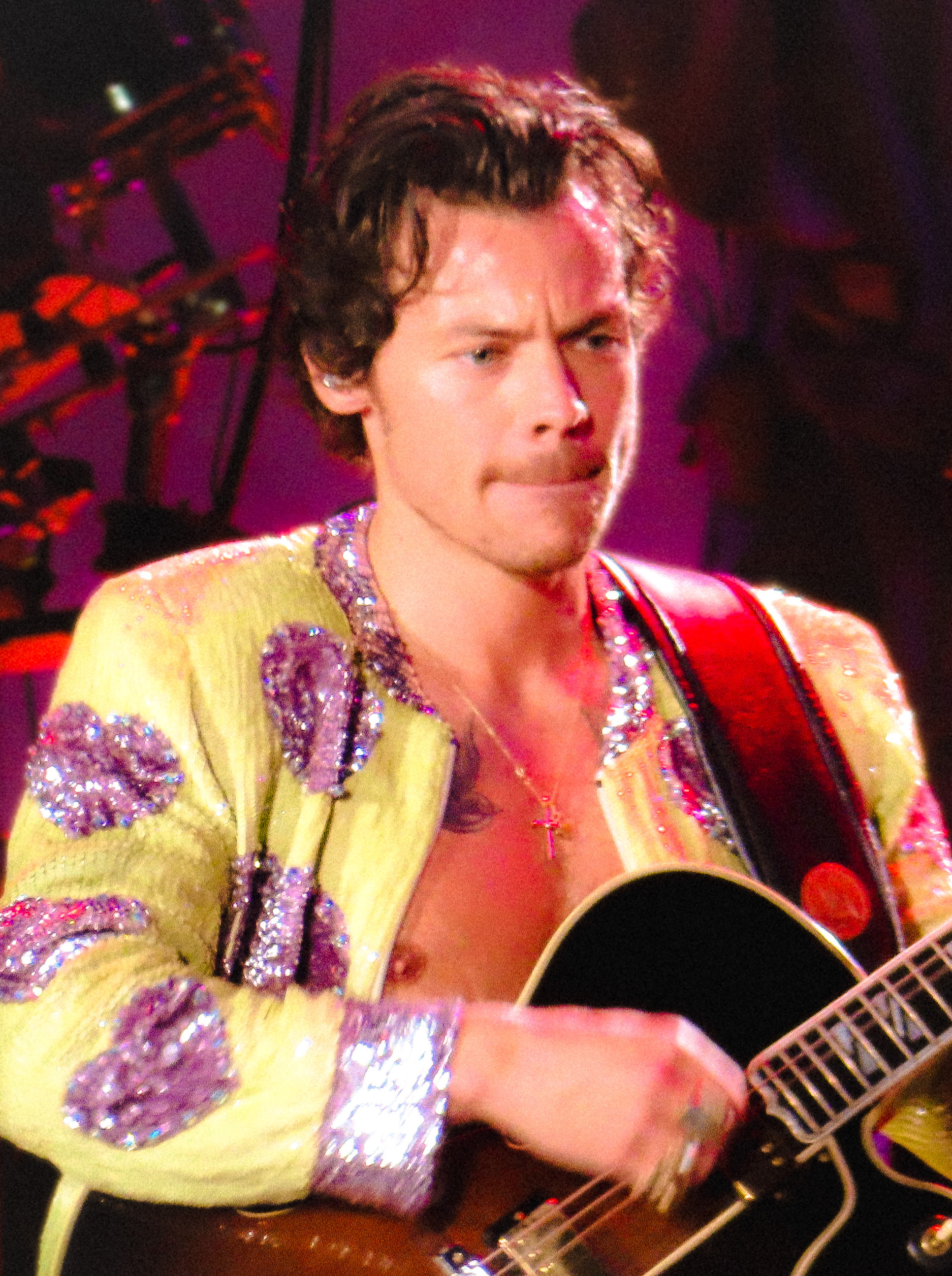
"As It Was" by Harry Styles topped the Global 200 for 15 weeks and the Global Excl. US for 13 weeks, making it the longest-reigning number-one song in the charts' histories.

The Billboard Global 200 is a chart that ranks the best-performing songs globally. Its data, published by Billboard magazine and compiled by MRC Data, is based on digital sales and online streaming from over 200 territories worldwide. Another similar chart is the Billboard Global Excl. US chart, which follows the same formula except it covers all territories excluding the US. The two charts launched on September 19, 2020.

On the Global 200, eleven singles reached number one in 2022. Nineteen artists reached the top of the chart, with sixteen—Gayle, Carolina Gaitán, Mauro Castillo, Adassa, Rhenzy Feliz, Diane Guerrero, Stephanie Beatriz, Glass Animals, Harry Styles, Kate Bush, Bizarrap, Quevedo, Blackpink, Sam Smith, Kim Petras, and 21 Savage—achieving their first number-one single. Blackpink scored two number-one singles, the only act to achieve multiple number ones in 2022. Harry Styles spent the most weeks at the top spot with 15 non-consecutive weeks at number one for his single "As It Was", which became the longest reigning number-one song in the chart's history.

On the Global Excl. US, eleven singles reached number one in 2022. Fourteen artists reached the top of the chart, with nine—Gayle, Glass Animals, Anitta, Harry Styles, Kate Bush, Bizarrap, Quevedo, Sam Smith and Kim Petras—achieving their first number-one single. Blackpink scored two number-one singles, the only act to achieve multiple number ones in 2022. Harry Styles spent the most weeks at the top spot with 13 non-consecutive weeks at number one for his single "As It Was", which became the longest reigning number-one song in the chart's history.

== Chart history ==
Key
†	Indicates best-performing song of 2022 on the Global 200
‡	Indicates best-performing song of 2022 on the Global Excl. US

Issue date	Billboard Global 200		Billboard Global Excl. US		Ref.
Issue date	Song	Artist(s)	Song	Artist(s)	Ref.
January 1	"All I Want for Christmas Is You"	Mariah Carey	"All I Want for Christmas Is You"	Mariah Carey	
January 8	"All I Want for Christmas Is You"	Mariah Carey	"All I Want for Christmas Is You"	Mariah Carey	
January 15	"ABCDEFU"	Gayle	"ABCDEFU"	Gayle	
January 22	"ABCDEFU"	Gayle	"ABCDEFU"	Gayle	
January 29	"ABCDEFU"	Gayle	"ABCDEFU"	Gayle	
February 5	"ABCDEFU"	Gayle	"ABCDEFU"	Gayle	
February 12	"We Don't Talk About Bruno"	Carolina Gaitán, Mauro Castillo, Adassa, Rhenzy Feliz, Diane Guerrero, Stephanie Beatriz and the Encanto cast	"ABCDEFU"	Gayle	
February 19	"We Don't Talk About Bruno"	Carolina Gaitán, Mauro Castillo, Adassa, Rhenzy Feliz, Diane Guerrero, Stephanie Beatriz and the Encanto cast	"ABCDEFU"	Gayle	
February 26	"We Don't Talk About Bruno"	Carolina Gaitán, Mauro Castillo, Adassa, Rhenzy Feliz, Diane Guerrero, Stephanie Beatriz and the Encanto cast	"ABCDEFU"	Gayle	
March 5	"Heat Waves"	Glass Animals	"ABCDEFU"	Gayle	
March 12	"Heat Waves"	Glass Animals	"ABCDEFU"	Gayle	
March 19	"Heat Waves"	Glass Animals	"Heat Waves"	Glass Animals	
March 26	"Heat Waves"	Glass Animals	"Heat Waves"	Glass Animals	
April 2	"Heat Waves"	Glass Animals	"Heat Waves"	Glass Animals	
April 9	"Heat Waves"	Glass Animals	"Envolver"	Anitta	
April 16	"As It Was" †	Harry Styles	"As It Was" ‡	Harry Styles	
April 23	"As It Was" †	Harry Styles	"As It Was" ‡	Harry Styles	
April 30	"As It Was" †	Harry Styles	"As It Was" ‡	Harry Styles	
May 7	"As It Was" †	Harry Styles	"As It Was" ‡	Harry Styles	
May 14	"As It Was" †	Harry Styles	"As It Was" ‡	Harry Styles	
May 21	"As It Was" †	Harry Styles	"As It Was" ‡	Harry Styles	
May 28	"As It Was" †	Harry Styles	"As It Was" ‡	Harry Styles	
June 4	"As It Was" †	Harry Styles	"As It Was" ‡	Harry Styles	
June 11	"As It Was" †	Harry Styles	"As It Was" ‡	Harry Styles	
June 18	"Running Up That Hill (A Deal With God)"	Kate Bush	"As It Was" ‡	Harry Styles	
June 25	"As It Was" †	Harry Styles	"Yet to Come (The Most Beautiful Moment)"	BTS	
July 2	"As It Was" †	Harry Styles	"As It Was" ‡	Harry Styles	
July 9	"As It Was" †	Harry Styles	"As It Was" ‡	Harry Styles	
July 16	"Running Up That Hill (A Deal With God)"	Kate Bush	"Running Up That Hill (A Deal With God)"	Kate Bush	
July 23	"Running Up That Hill (A Deal With God)"	Kate Bush	"As It Was" ‡	Harry Styles	
July 30	"Bzrp Music Sessions, Vol. 52"	Bizarrap and Quevedo	"Bzrp Music Sessions, Vol. 52"	Bizarrap and Quevedo	
August 6	"Bzrp Music Sessions, Vol. 52"	Bizarrap and Quevedo	"Bzrp Music Sessions, Vol. 52"	Bizarrap and Quevedo	
August 13	"Bzrp Music Sessions, Vol. 52"	Bizarrap and Quevedo	"Bzrp Music Sessions, Vol. 52"	Bizarrap and Quevedo	
August 20	"As It Was" †	Harry Styles	"Bzrp Music Sessions, Vol. 52"	Bizarrap and Quevedo	
August 27	"Bzrp Music Sessions, Vol. 52"	Bizarrap and Quevedo	"Bzrp Music Sessions, Vol. 52"	Bizarrap and Quevedo	
September 3	"Pink Venom"	Blackpink	"Pink Venom"	Blackpink	
September 10	"Pink Venom"	Blackpink	"Pink Venom"	Blackpink	
September 17	"As It Was" †	Harry Styles	"Pink Venom"	Blackpink	
September 24	"As It Was" †	Harry Styles	"Bzrp Music Sessions, Vol. 52"	Bizarrap and Quevedo	
October 1	"Shut Down"	Blackpink	"Shut Down"	Blackpink	
October 8	"Unholy"	Sam Smith and Kim Petras	"Unholy"	Sam Smith and Kim Petras	
October 15	"Unholy"	Sam Smith and Kim Petras	"Unholy"	Sam Smith and Kim Petras	
October 22	"Unholy"	Sam Smith and Kim Petras	"Unholy"	Sam Smith and Kim Petras	
October 29	"Unholy"	Sam Smith and Kim Petras	"Unholy"	Sam Smith and Kim Petras	
November 5	"Anti-Hero"	Taylor Swift	"Anti-Hero"	Taylor Swift	
November 12	"Anti-Hero"	Taylor Swift	"Anti-Hero"	Taylor Swift	
November 19	"Rich Flex"	Drake and 21 Savage	"Unholy"	Sam Smith and Kim Petras	
November 26	"Anti-Hero"	Taylor Swift	"Unholy"	Sam Smith and Kim Petras	
December 3	"Anti-Hero"	Taylor Swift	"Unholy"	Sam Smith and Kim Petras	
December 10	"All I Want for Christmas Is You"	Mariah Carey	"Unholy"	Sam Smith and Kim Petras	
December 17	"All I Want for Christmas Is You"	Mariah Carey	"All I Want for Christmas Is You"	Mariah Carey	
December 24	"All I Want for Christmas Is You"	Mariah Carey	"All I Want for Christmas Is You"	Mariah Carey	
December 31	"All I Want for Christmas Is You"	Mariah Carey	"All I Want for Christmas Is You"	Mariah Carey	

== Number-one artists ==
List of number-one artists by total weeks at number one on Global 200
Position	Artist	Weeks at No. 1
1	Harry Styles	15
2	Mariah Carey	6
2	Glass Animals	6
3	Gayle	4
3	Bizarrap	4
3	Quevedo	4
3	Sam Smith	4
3	Kim Petras	4
3	Taylor Swift	4
4	Blackpink	3
4	Kate Bush	3
4	Carolina Gaitán	3
4	Mauro Castillo	3
4	Adassa	3
4	Rhenzy Feliz	3
4	Diane Guerrero	3
4	Stephanie Beatriz	3
4	Encanto cast	3
5	Drake	1
5	21 Savage	1

List of number-one artists by total weeks at number one on Global Excl. US
Position	Artist	Weeks at No. 1
1	Harry Styles	13
2	Gayle	9
3	Sam Smith	8
3	Kim Petras	8
4	Bizarrap	6
4	Quevedo	6
5	Mariah Carey	5
6	Blackpink	4
7	Glass Animals	3
8	Taylor Swift	2
9	Anitta	1
9	BTS	1
9	Kate Bush	1

== See also ==
- 2022 in music
- Billboard Year-End Global 200 singles of 2022
- List of Billboard 200 number-one albums of 2022
- List of Billboard Hot 100 number ones of 2022
