= Pink Venom =

2022 single by Blackpink

Single by Blackpink

from the album Born Pink
- Language: Korean; English
- Released: August 19, 2022
- Studio: The Black Label (Seoul)
- Genre: Dance; hip-hop; EDM; pop rap
- Length: 3:06
- Label: YG; Interscope
- Composers: Teddy; 24; R.Tee; Ido
- Lyricists: Teddy; Danny Chung

Blackpink singles chronology
"Lovesick Girls" (2020)	"Pink Venom" (2022)	"Shut Down" (2022)

Music video
- "Pink Venom" on YouTube

"Pink Venom" is a song recorded by South Korean girl group Blackpink. It was released through YG Entertainment and Interscope Records on August 19, 2022, as the lead single from the group's second studio album, Born Pink (2022). It is a hip-hop, pop rap, dance and EDM song that incorporates Korean traditional instruments, 90s hip-hop and electropop musical styles. The track was composed by Teddy, 24, R.Tee, and Ido, with its lyrics penned by Teddy and Danny Chung.

"Pink Venom" received mixed reviews from critics, who complimented its catchy production but criticized its composition and its lack of musical growth. The song was commercially successful worldwide and spent two weeks atop the Billboard Global 200, marking the first time a girl group reached number one on the chart. In South Korea, the song peaked at number two on the Circle Digital Chart, while it peaked at number 22 on the US Billboard Hot 100 as well as the UK Singles Chart. It became the first song by a K-pop group to reach number one in Australia, and topped the charts in eight other territories. It was certified platinum in South Korea, Canada, and New Zealand, gold in Australia and Japan, and silver in the United Kingdom.

The music video for "Pink Venom" was directed by Seo Hyun-seung and received 90.4 million views within 24 hours on YouTube—the biggest 24-hour debut for a music video in 2022, and the third-largest of all time on the platform. To promote the single, Blackpink performed on the South Korean music program Inkigayo as well as the 2022 MTV Video Music Awards, where they became the first Korean girl group to perform at the award ceremony. Its accolades include Best Choreography at the MTV Video Music Awards and Best Music Video at the MAMA Awards.

== Background and release ==
On July 6, 2022, YG Entertainment announced that Blackpink was in the process of finishing recording for their new album and preparing to shoot a music video in mid-July for release in August. The label also confirmed that the group would embark on the largest world tour by a K-pop girl group in history. On July 31, YG Entertainment officially released trailer video for Born Pink through the group's official social media accounts, announcing that the world tour would start in October, following a pre-release single in August and the album itself in September. The label later confirmed that two music videos were filmed to support the album, reportedly with the highest production budgets they have ever invested into a music video. On August 7, it was announced that the album's pre-release single would be titled "Pink Venom" and released on August 19, 2022.

On August 10, two sets of individual member teaser posters for "Pink Venom" were posted to Blackpink's official social media accounts. Within the next couple of days, two sets of concept teaser videos were released for each individual member. On August 13, the credits of the song were reported through a teaser poster with all four members together. A new concept video was presented a day later, showing all four members being trapped in a glass box. The teaser for the music video was soon unveiled, with the music video premiering on YouTube on August 19. Internationally, the song was released to the airplay markets in Italy on August 26, and in the United States on August 30, 2022.

== Composition and lyrics ==
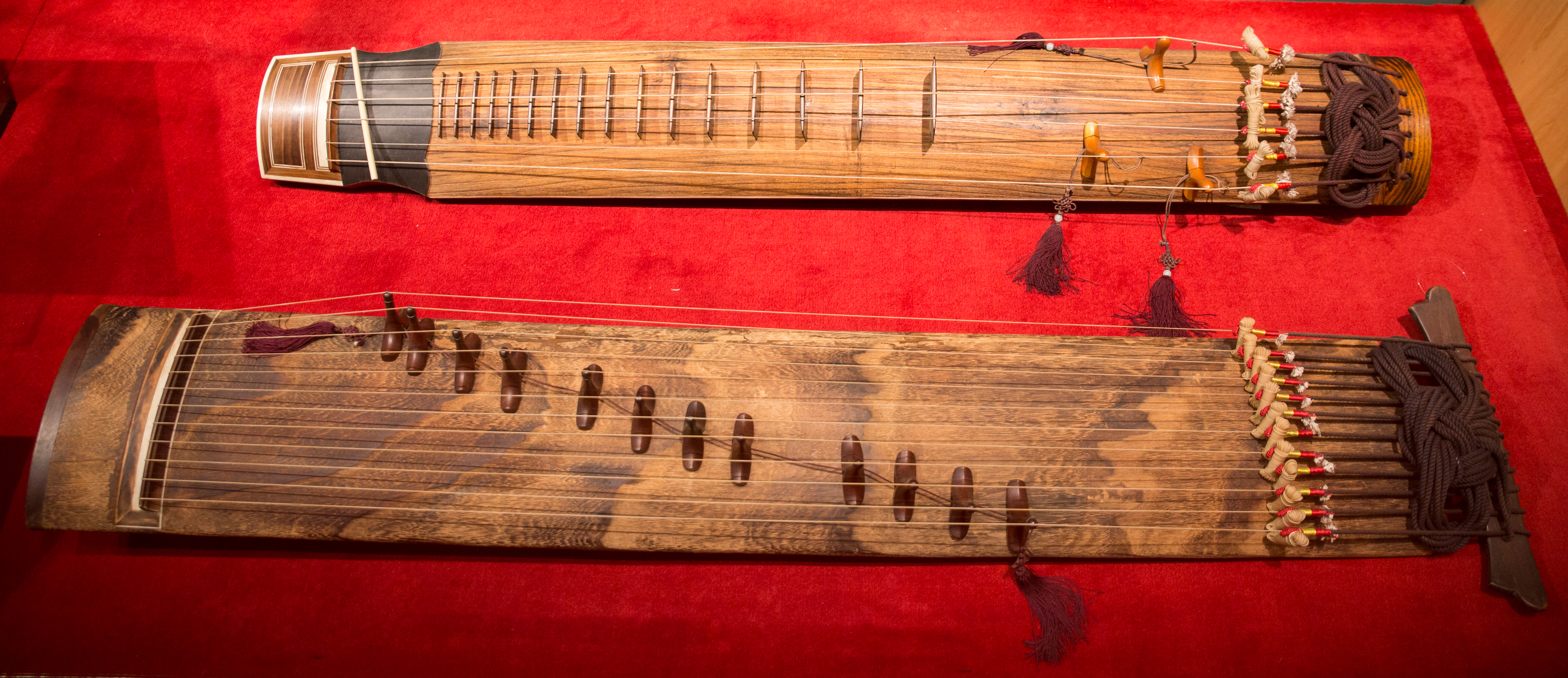
"Pink Venom" incorporates instrumentations from traditional Korean stringed zithers, such as the gayageum (bottom) and geomungo (top).

"Pink Venom" was written by Teddy Park and Danny Chung and composed by Teddy, 24, R.Tee, and Ido, while production was handled by 24, R.Tee, and Ido. It is a dance, EDM, hip-hop and pop rap song that incorporates traditional Korean instruments, such as the geomungo and gayageum. The song draws influences from 90s hip-hop and electropop, with The Korea Herald noting how it combines "the group's trademark hip-hop style" with the sound of traditional Korean instruments. In terms of musical notation, the song is written in the key of C minor and has a tempo of 90 beats per minute.

"Pink Venom" opens with minor chords played on the geomungo, a traditional Korean plucked zither, as Jennie sings "I talk that talk, runways I walk, walk". It leads into an accelerating, electropop beat in the second verse; and following the chorus, the production of "Pink Venom" switches with Lisa and Jennie delivering a "late-90s Eminem-style" rap. Jon Caramanica of The New York Times noted the track's combination of several musical styles: "Every four bars, a new approach enters — familiar K-pop elasticity, loose Middle Eastern themes, gaudy rock, West Coast rap, and more." Its lyrical content conveys Blackpink's presentation of contradicting images such as "sweet" and "deadly", with Jennie commenting, "we thought they were kind of reminiscent of us… It's pink venom, a lovely poison, it's words that most express us."

"Pink Venom"
Lisa and Jennie's rap in "Pink Venom" has been noted by critics for being reminiscent of 1990s hip-hop, drawing influences from West Coast rap, and G-funk.

Vulture's Charlie Harding noted that "The song is a maximalist homage to classic hip-hop and pop that intensifies the recent trend of heavy sampling and interpolation". Harding added, "the band flips the script in the second verse with aplaintive G-funk- style moog floating over a '90s hip-hop beat reminiscent of Missy Elliott's 'Work It', but all of these Western references are balanced with Korean sounds." "Pink Venom" includes three lyrical references: Jennie opens the first verse with "Kick in the door, waving the coco," a play on the lyric "Kick in the door, wavin' the .44" from the Notorious B.I.G.'s "Kick in the Door" (1997), while one of Lisa's verses interpolates the lyrics "One by one, then two by two" from Rihanna's "Pon de Replay" (2005). Rosé's verse "Look what you made us do" in the pre-chorus references Taylor Swift's "Look What You Made Me Do" (2017).

== Critical reception ==
Professional ratings
Review scores
Source	Rating
IZM	2/5 stars
NME	4/5 stars

"Pink Venom" was met with mixed reviews upon its release. Tanu I. Raj of NME wrote in a four star review that "Pink Venom" represents a "promising preview of their new era", but commented that the song's name-dropping of luxury brands got "old quickly" and compromised "what is an otherwise exciting arrangement." Pitchfork's Alex Ramos felt that the song "impresses with its braggadocio and influences" and praised the use of lyrical references from the 1990s and '00s. Rob Sheffield of Rolling Stone called it the group's "splashiest hit yet", while the same publication ranked it at number 35 in their list of the top 100 songs of 2022, deeming it an "unbelievably fun raising-hell anthem full of Eighties hair-metal glam." Billboard ranked it the 4th best K-pop song of 2022, while Time Out named it among the best songs of the year, with an editor complimenting its catchy melody.

Conversely, Lauren Puckett-Pope from Elle remarked that "The song is catchy but discombobulated", and criticized the track's "disorienting blend of rap, floating vocals, and an anti-drop chorus". Raul Stanciu from Sputnikmusic wrote that "Pink Venom" "offers a cute contrast with the sweet tone on the choruses, but those cannot detract enough from the dumb lyrics." Chase McMullen from Beats Per Minute gave it a generic review and viewed it as a typical Blackpink song. Park Soo-jin of IZM expressed disappointment with "Pink Venom" and rated it two stars out of five, feeling that Blackpink "rushed out to create an image, not a song", and expressed that "there is a sense of fatigue from those who want to look higher". Likewise, Benedetta Geddo from The Mary Sue opined that the song "isn't exactly stellar", expressing disdain of "the same tried and tested Teddy Park Formula which has grown so, so, so tiresome".

== Accolades ==
"Pink Venom" received seven first place music program awards in South Korea, including three awards on both M Countdown and Inkigayo—achieving two triple crowns (or three awards on a program). It also received three Melon Weekly Popularity Awards on August 29, September 5, and September 19, 2022.

Awards and nominations for "Pink Venom"
Year	Organization	Award	Result	Ref.
2022	Asian Pop Music Awards	Song of the Year (Overseas)	Won	
2022	Asian Pop Music Awards	Top 20 Songs of the Year (Overseas)	Won	
2022	Asian Pop Music Awards	Best Composer (Overseas) (Note: Composers: Teddy Park, 24, R.Tee, and Ido)	Nominated	
2022	Asian Pop Music Awards	Best Dance Performance (Overseas)	Nominated	
2022	Asian Pop Music Awards	Best Music Video (Overseas)	Nominated	
2022	Asian Pop Music Awards	Record of the Year (Overseas)	Nominated	
2022	BreakTudo Awards	International Music Video	Won	
2022	MAMA Awards	Best Music Video	Won	
2022	MAMA Awards	Best Dance Performance Female Group	Nominated	
2022	MAMA Awards	Song of the Year	Nominated	
2022	MTV Europe Music Awards	Best Video	Nominated	
2022	MTV Video Music Awards Japan	Best Group Video (International)	Won	
2022	MTV Video Music Awards Japan	Video of the Year	Nominated	
2022	NRJ Music Awards	International Clip of the Year	Nominated	
2022	People's Choice Awards	The Music Video of 2022	Nominated	
2023	Circle Chart Music Awards	Artist of the Year – Global Digital Music (August)	Won	
2023	Golden Disc Awards	Best Digital Song (Bonsang)	Nominated	
2023	iHeartRadio Music Awards	Best Music Video	Nominated	
2023	iHeartRadio Music Awards	Favorite Use of a Sample	Nominated	
2023	MTV Video Music Awards	Best Choreography	Won	
2023	MTV Video Music Awards	Best Art Direction	Nominated	
2023	MTV Video Music Awards	Best Editing	Nominated	
2023	MTV Video Music Awards	Best K-Pop	Nominated	
2023	Webby Awards	Best Partnership or Collaboration, Features (Social) (Note: Nominated for #PinkVenomChallenge)	Won	

Music program awards
Program	Date	Ref.
Show Champion	August 24, 2022	
M Countdown	August 25, 2022	
M Countdown	September 1, 2022	
M Countdown	September 8, 2022	
Inkigayo	September 4, 2022	
Inkigayo	September 18, 2022	
Inkigayo	September 25, 2022	

== Commercial performance ==
Upon release, "Pink Venom" broke the record for Spotify's most-streamed song by a female artist in a single day in 2022. It became the first song by a female K-pop artist to top Spotify's Global Top Songs chart and the first K-pop song in history to top the chart for multiple days. Additionally, it exceeded 100 million streams on the platform in 17 days, becoming the fastest song to do so by a female K-pop artist. "Pink Venom" debuted at number one on the Billboard Global 200 with 212.1 million streams and 36,000 downloads sold, earning Blackpink's first number-one on the chart and the second-biggest worldwide weekly streaming total in the chart's history. The song also debuted at number one on the Global Excl. U.S. with 198.1 million streams and 27,000 downloads sold, earning Blackpink their second number-one on the chart after "Lovesick Girls". With this, Blackpink became the third act to achieve multiple number-ones on the chart, after BTS and Justin Bieber. "Pink Venom" topped both charts for a second week with 108.4 million streams and 7,000 downloads worldwide, and 99.5 million streams and 5,000 downloads outside the U.S., becoming the first Korean-language song to top either chart for multiple weeks. The song remained on the Global 200 for 30 weeks and the Global Excl. US for 46 weeks.

In South Korea, "Pink Venom" debuted at number 22 on the Circle Digital Chart during the week of August 20, with less than two days of tracking, and rose to a peak at number two the following week. In Japan, the song opened with 3,236 downloads and 3,068,603 streams during the week of August 21, debuting at number 16 on the weekly Oricon Singles Chart. It debuted at number 22 on the Billboard Japan Hot 100 and peaked at number 10 the following week. It has since been certified gold by the Recording Industry Association of Japan (RIAJ) for reaching 50,000,000 streams in the country. In other Asian territories, "Pink Venom" topped the charts in Hong Kong, Taiwan, Indonesia, Malaysia, Singapore, the Philippines, Vietnam, and India. In North America, "Pink Venom" entered the US Billboard Hot 100 at number 22, becoming the highest-charting solo song by a K-pop girl group, ranking behind only the group's collaboration with Selena Gomez on "Ice Cream" (2020). It marked Blackpink's eighth career entry and their fourth top-40 hit on the chart. It opened with sales of 11,000 downloads and a radio airplay audience of 359,000 people, according to Billboard. It remained on the Hot 100 for a total of six weeks and became the longest-charting song by a K-pop group in 2022. In Canada, the song debuted at number four on the Canadian Hot 100 and became their first top-10 entry in the country. It remained on the chart for a total of nine weeks, and received a platinum certification by Music Canada for surpassing 80,000 units sold.

In Australia, "Pink Venom" debuted at number one on the ARIA Singles Chart dated August 29, making Blackpink the first K-pop group in history to top the chart. They also broke the record for the highest-debuting song by a K-pop group, beating the number two debut of BTS's "Dynamite" (2020). Blackpink joined Psy as the only two Korean artists in history to top the ARIA Singles Chart; Psy did so with "Gangnam Style" a decade earlier in 2012. The song has since been certified gold by the Australian Recording Industry Association (ARIA) for surpassing 35,000 units sold in the country. In New Zealand, the song debuted at number nine on the NZ Singles Chart, becoming Blackpink's first top-ten hit in the country. In Europe, "Pink Venom" peaked at number 22 in the United Kingdom, becoming the group's seventh top-forty hit. It reached a peak of number 23 in Ireland, number 32 in Germany, number 44 in France, and number 94 in Italy.

== Music video ==
A scene in the music video where Jisoo plays the geomungo while surrounded by chanting hooded figures

A music video teaser for "Pink Venom" was released on August 17, 2022, followed by the official music video on August 19. The music video was directed by Seo Hyun-seung, a frequent collaborator with the group. Upon release, it reached 90.4 million views in 24 hours, surpassing the previous record held by their own track "How You Like That" (2020) for the most-viewed video by a female artist in a single day. It also scored the biggest music video premiere of 2022 and third-biggest of all time on the platform, and went on to receive over 100 million views within 30 hours. On August 4, 2025, the music video surpassed one billion views, becoming Blackpink's seventh video to join the billion-view club and the ninth on their YouTube channel including solo releases "Solo" by Jennie and "Money" by Lisa.

The music video opens with Jisoo wearing a hanbok with a contemporary spin, playing a melody on a geomungo while surrounded by rows of kneeling black-hooded figures wearing VR headsets and chanting the name "Blackpink". Jennie breaks through a concrete wall in a monster truck and struts down a red carpet in front of the truck wearing a sheer red gown. Afterwards, Lisa walks into a room inside a pyramid, where she picks a black apple from a tree and eats it; her eyes turn pink upon taking the first bite. Rosé appears in the next scene, pulling a black heart out of a stream of black water in a stormy environment. Lisa and Jennie then rap together; Lisa wears a streetwear-inspired cropped basketball shirt and denim overalls, and Jennie wears a cropped Manchester United F.C. jersey. During their next verses, Jisoo portrays a vampire while Rosé plays electric guitar in a fire-lit cave. In the chorus, the group members perform the choreography together in various settings, including a raging sandstorm and a jungle.

Elle India included "Pink Venom" in their list of the Top 10 Most Fashionable K-Pop Music Videos of 2022, remarking how it serves as "a venomous demonstration of the band's signature extravagant fashion, with over 20 high-end labels on display." Mashable India named it among the best and most influential K-pop performances of 2022 while Hypebae included it in their list of the best K-pop songs and music videos of the year. Behind-the-scenes footage of the music video was made available on August 19. The dance practice video for "Pink Venom" was released on August 23, 2022; the video consists of the four members performing the choreography surrounded by an ensemble of black-clad backup dancers. The performance was choreographed by Kiel Tuten and Sienna Lalau, who had previously worked with Twice, Aespa and BTS. In addition, YGX choreographers Leejung Lee and Taryn Cheng worked together to complete the project.

== Live performances and promotion ==
Two days prior to the release of "Pink Venom", YG Entertainment unveiled a schedule for the band's "Light Up the Pink" initiative; this campaign involved lighting up numerous landmarks around the world in pink to promote the song, starting from August 18. On the same day, Blackpink teamed up with YouTube Shorts and launched a "#PinkVenomChallenge" to promote the release of the song and its choreography. On August 28, 2022, Blackpink presented a pre-recorded performance of "Pink Venom" on SBS's Inkigayo for the first time. On the same day, Blackpink appeared and performed at the 2022 MTV Video Music Awards at the Prudential Center in New Jersey, marking their American awards show debut and making them the first female K-pop group in history to perform at the ceremony. Billboard and Time named it one of the best performances of the night. However, Variety named it among the worst performances at the ceremony and included it under a subheading labeled "Lip-Sync Snafus"; this led to a backlash from fans who pointed out that the group was, in fact, performing live.

Beginning in October, "Pink Venom" was included in the setlist of Blackpink's Born Pink World Tour (2022–2023). On January 28, 2023, the group performed the song with French cellist Gautier Capuçon at the Le Gala des Pièces Jaunes charity event organized by the First Lady of France, Brigitte Macron, in Paris. In April and June 2023, Blackpink performed "Pink Venom" as the opening song of their sets as the headlining act of the Coachella Valley Music and Arts Festival in Indio, California and BST Hyde Park in London, England.

== Credits and personnel ==
Credits adapted from the liner notes of Born Pink.

Recording

- Recorded at The Black Label Studio (Seoul)
- Mixed at Gudwin Music Group Inc
- Mastered at Sterling Sound (New York City)

Personnel

- Blackpink – vocals
- Teddy – lyricist, composer
- Danny Chung – lyricist
- 24 – composer, arranger
- R.Tee – composer, arranger
- Ido – composer, arranger
- Youngju Bang – recording engineer
- Josh Gudwin – mixing engineer
- Chris Gehringer – mastering engineer

== Charts ==
=== Weekly charts ===
Weekly chart performance for "Pink Venom"
Chart (2022)	Peak position
Argentina (Argentina Hot 100)	32
Australia (ARIA)	1
Austria (Ö3 Austria Top 40)	28
Brazil (Billboard)	18
Canada Hot 100 (Billboard)	4
Croatia (Billboard)	10
Czech Republic Singles Digital (ČNS IFPI)	51
Finland Airplay (Radiosoittolista)	54
France (SNEP)	44
Germany (GfK)	32
Global 200 (Billboard)	1
Greece International (IFPI)	9
Hong Kong (Billboard)	1
Hungary (Single Top 40)	5
India International (IMI)	1
Indonesia (Billboard)	1
Ireland (IRMA)	23
Italy (FIMI)	94
Japan Hot 100 (Billboard)	10
Japan Combined Singles (Oricon)	16
Lithuania (AGATA)	11
Luxembourg (Billboard)	20
Malaysia (Billboard)	1
Mexico (Billboard)	21
Netherlands (Single Tip)	2
Netherlands (Global Top 40)	1
New Zealand (Recorded Music NZ)	9
Panama (PRODUCE)	17
Philippines (Billboard)	1
Peru (Billboard)	13
Portugal (AFP)	26
Romania (Billboard)	16
Singapore (RIAS)	1
Slovakia (Singles Digitál Top 100)	20
South Africa Streaming (TOSAC)	38
South Korea (Circle)	2
Spain (PROMUSICAE)	75
Sweden Heatseeker (Sverigetopplistan)	1
Switzerland (Schweizer Hitparade)	41
Taiwan (Billboard)	1
Turkey (Billboard)	11
UK Singles (Official Charts)	22
US Billboard Hot 100	22
US Pop Airplay (Billboard)	32
US World Digital Song Sales (Billboard)	1
Vietnam Hot 100 (Billboard)	1

=== Monthly charts ===
Monthly chart performance for "Pink Venom"
Chart (2022)	Peak position
South Korea (Circle)	3

=== Year-end charts ===
2022 year-end chart performance for "Pink Venom"
Chart (2022)	Position
Global 200 (Billboard)	94
South Korea (Circle)	41
Vietnam (Vietnam Hot 100)	9

2023 year-end chart performance for "Pink Venom"
Chart (2023)	Position
Global Excl. US (Billboard)	106
South Korea (Circle)	66

== Certifications ==
Certifications for "Pink Venom"
Region	Certification	Certified units/sales
Australia (ARIA)	Gold	35,000^{‡}
Brazil (Pro-Música Brasil)	2× Platinum	80,000^{‡}
Canada (Music Canada)	Platinum	80,000^{‡}
France (SNEP)	Gold	100,000^{‡}
New Zealand (RMNZ)	Platinum	30,000^{‡}
United Kingdom (BPI)	Silver	200,000^{‡}
Streaming
Japan (RIAJ)	Gold	50,000,000^{†}
South Korea (KMCA)	Platinum	100,000,000^{†}
^{‡} Sales+streaming figures based on certification alone.^{†} Streaming-only figures based on certification alone.

== Release history ==
Release dates and formats for "Pink Venom"
Region	Date	Format	Label	Ref.
Various	August 19, 2022	Digital download; streaming	YG; Interscope	
Italy	August 26, 2022	Radio airplay	Universal	
United States	August 30, 2022	Contemporary hit radio	YG; Interscope	

== See also ==
- List of best-selling girl group singles
- List of Billboard Global 200 number ones of 2022
- List of Billboard Global 200 top-ten singles in 2022
- List of certified songs in South Korea
- List of Inkigayo Chart winners (2022)
- List of K-pop songs on the Billboard charts
- List of M Countdown Chart winners (2022)
- List of number-one singles of 2022 (Australia)
- List of number-one songs of 2022 (Hong Kong)
- List of number-one singles (India)
- List of number-one songs of 2022 (Malaysia)
- List of number-one songs of 2022 (Philippines)
- List of number-one songs of 2022 (Singapore)
- List of number-one songs of 2022 (Vietnam)
- List of Show Champion Chart winners (2022)
