= List of Inkigayo Chart winners (2022) =

Inkigayo Chart winners (2022)

Highlights
- Artist(s) with most wins: Ive (7)
- Song with highest score: "Tomboy" by (G)I-dle (9,648)

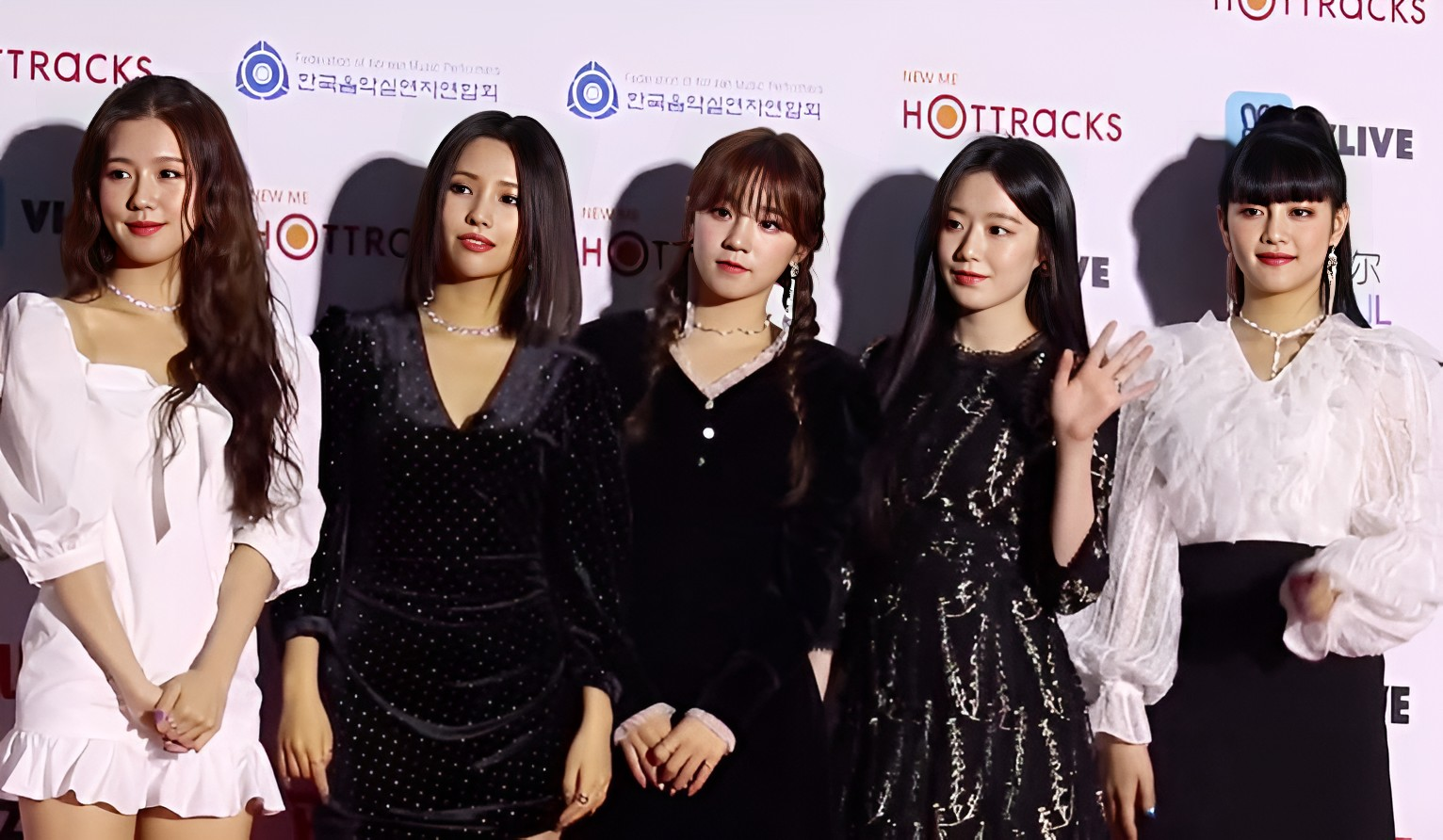
(G)I-dle's win for "Tomboy" had the highest score of 2022, with 9,648 points on the April 3 broadcast. "Tomboy" and their succeeding single "Nxde" both earned triple crowns.

The Inkigayo Chart is a music program record chart on Seoul Broadcasting System (SBS) that gives an award to the best-performing single of the week in South Korea. In 2022, the chart awarded points based on digital performance in domestic online music services (5,500 points), social media via YouTube views (3,000 points), album sales (1,000 points), network on-air time (1,000 points), viewer votes in advance of the show (500 points), and real-time voting via the Starpass mobile app (500 points) in its ranking methodology. Songs that spend three weeks at number one are awarded a triple crown and are removed from the chart and ineligible to win again. Treasure's Jihoon, Riize's Sungchan, and Ive's An Yu-jin had been hosting the show since March 7, 2021 and continued to do so till March 27, 2022. Starting in April 2022, actress Roh Jeong-eui, actor Seo Bum-june, and Tomorrow X Together member Choi Yeon-jun became the new hosts of the show.

In 2022, 20 singles achieved number one on the chart, and 15 acts were awarded first-place trophies for this feat. Eleven songs collected trophies for three weeks and earned a triple crown: Ive's "Eleven" and "Love Dive", Taeyeon's "INVU", Big Bang's "Still Life", Psy's "That That", (G)I-dle's "Tomboy" and "Nxde", Nayeon's "Pop!", Blackpink's "Pink Venom" and "Shut Down", and Younha's "Event Horizon". The number-one song at the start of the year was Ive's debut single "Eleven". The group had two more singles rank number one in 2022: "Love Dive" and "After Like". The three songs spent a total of seven weeks atop the chart making Ive the artist with the most weeks at number one in 2022. Got the Beat, a supergroup consisting of BoA, Taeyeon and Hyoyeon from Girls' Generation, Seulgi and Wendy from Red Velvet, and Karina and Winter from Aespa, achieved their first number one with their debut single "Step Back" on the January 30 broadcast. Member Taeyeon had one number-one single on the chart in 2022, "INVU", which also achieved a triple crown. Girl group NewJeans made their first appearance on the chart with their debut single "Attention". Twice's Nayeon achieved her first-ever Inkigayo award with her debut single "Pop!".

Besides Ive, three other acts had more than one number one on the chart in 2022. (G)I-dle had two singles rank number one in 2022, "Tomboy" and "Nxde", both of which ranked number one for three weeks and achieved triple crowns. Their single "Tomboy" acquired 9,648 points on the April 3 broadcast, making it the song with the highest score of the year. Blackpink also had two number-one singles, "Pink Venom" and "Shut Down", both of which achieved triple crowns. The only other artist to have two number-one singles in 2022 was NCT Dream, who achieved this with their singles "Glitch Mode" and "Beatbox".

== Chart history ==
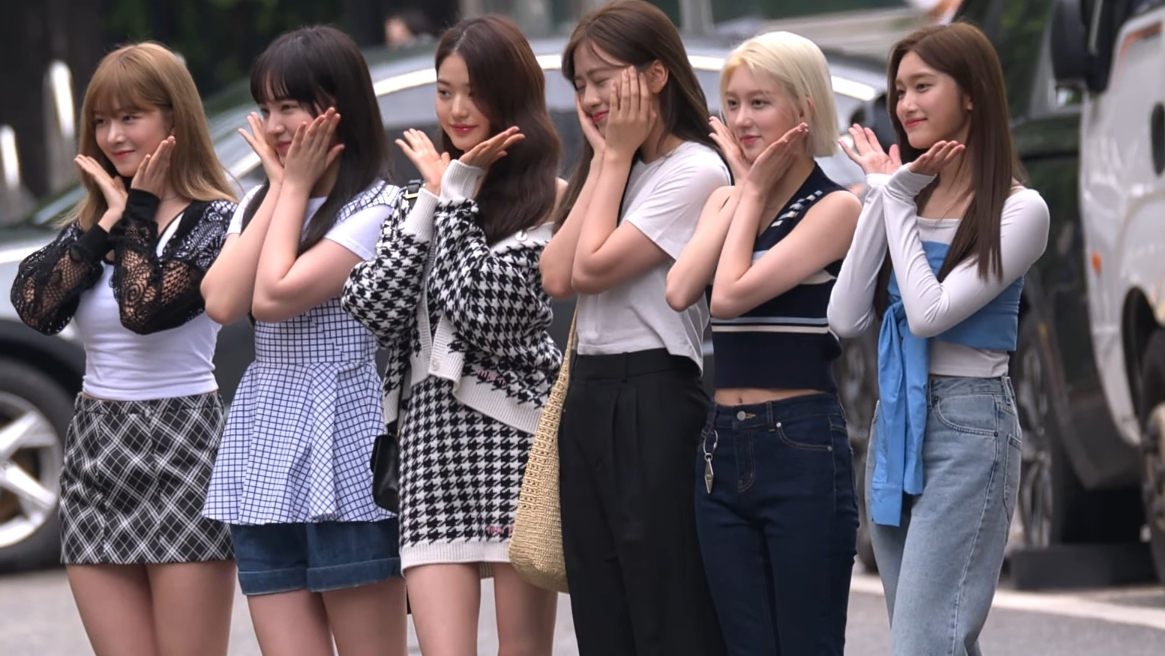
Ive won their first Inkigayo trophy and their first triple crown for "Eleven". They also earned a triple crown for the succeeding single "Love Dive". The two singles along with "After Like", ranked number one for a total of 7 weeks making them the artist with the most weeks at number-one in 2022. Member Yujin (third from right) was a co-host of the program until March 2022.

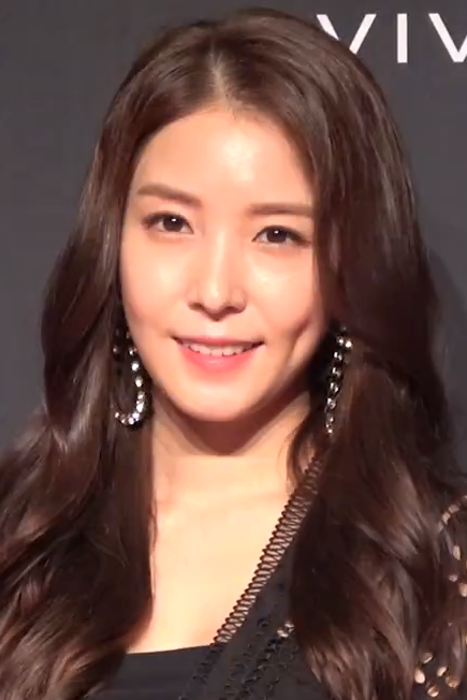
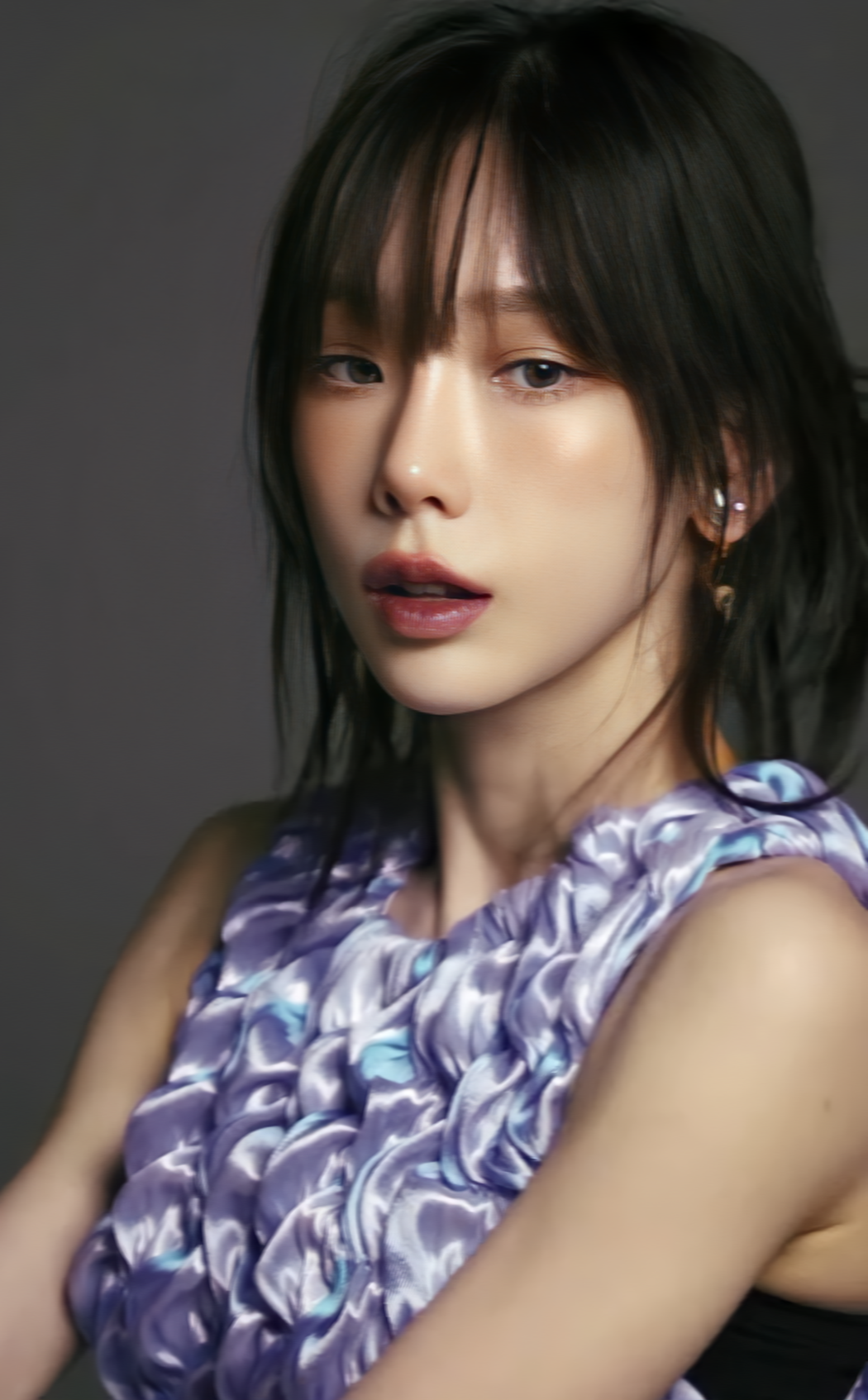
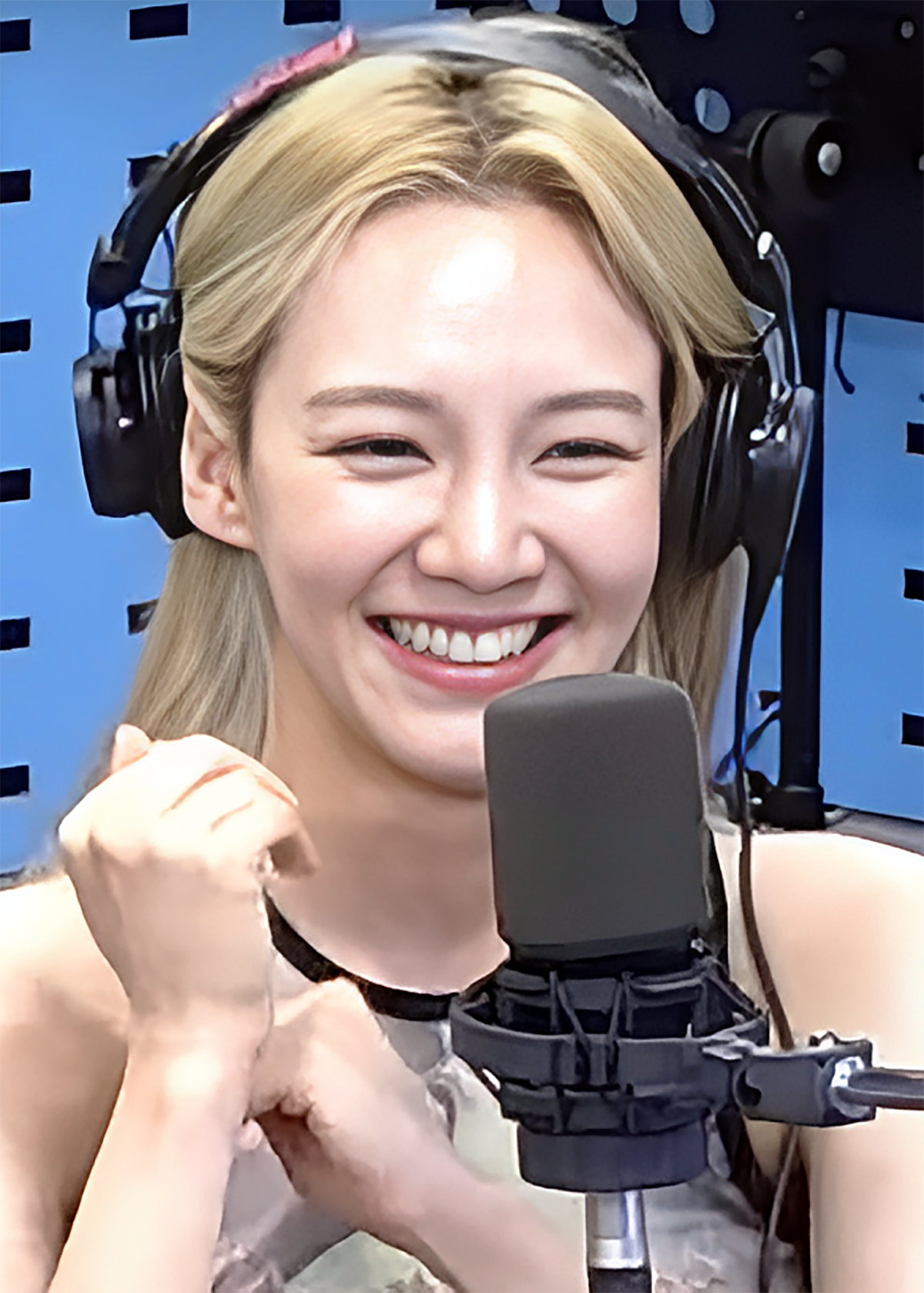
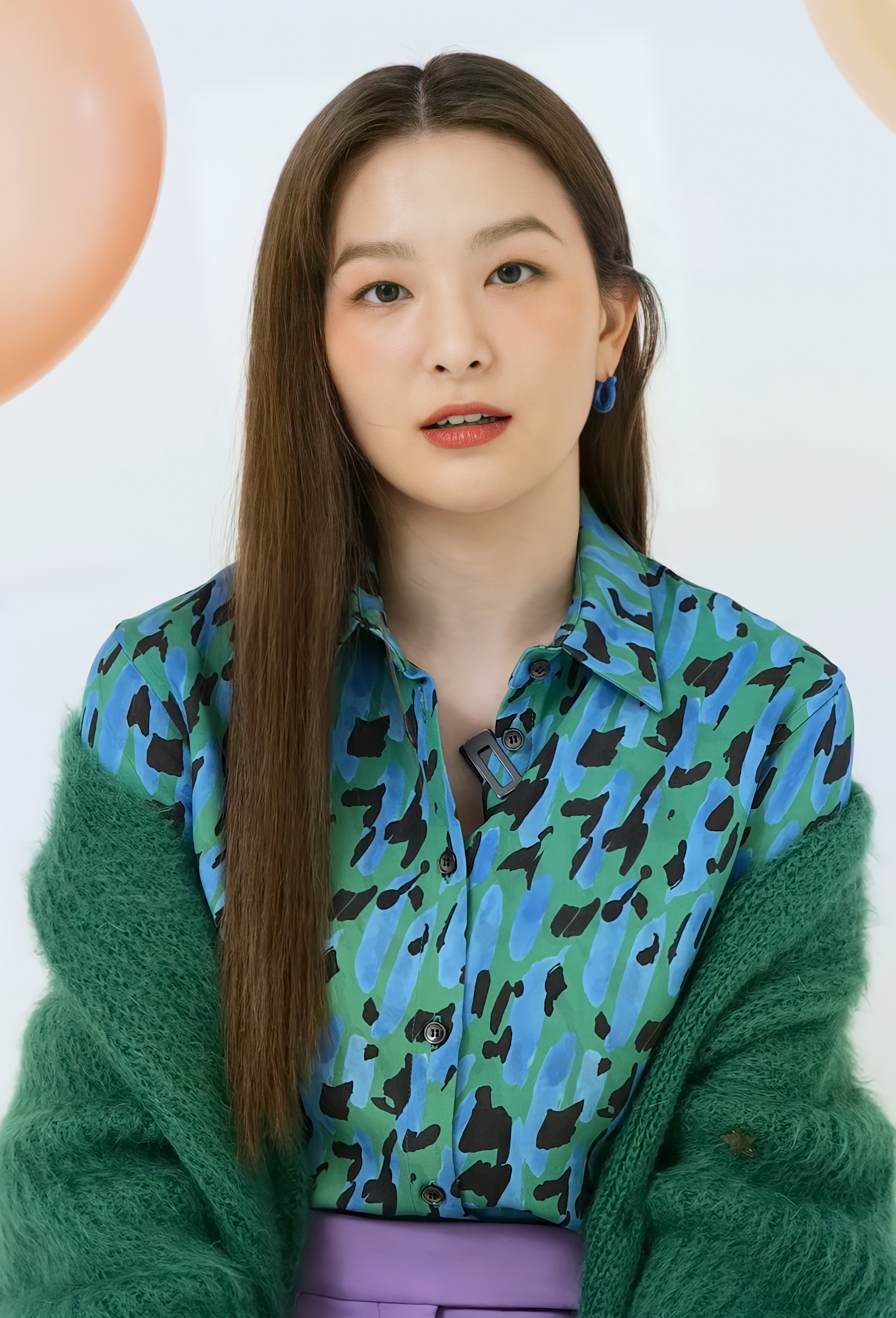
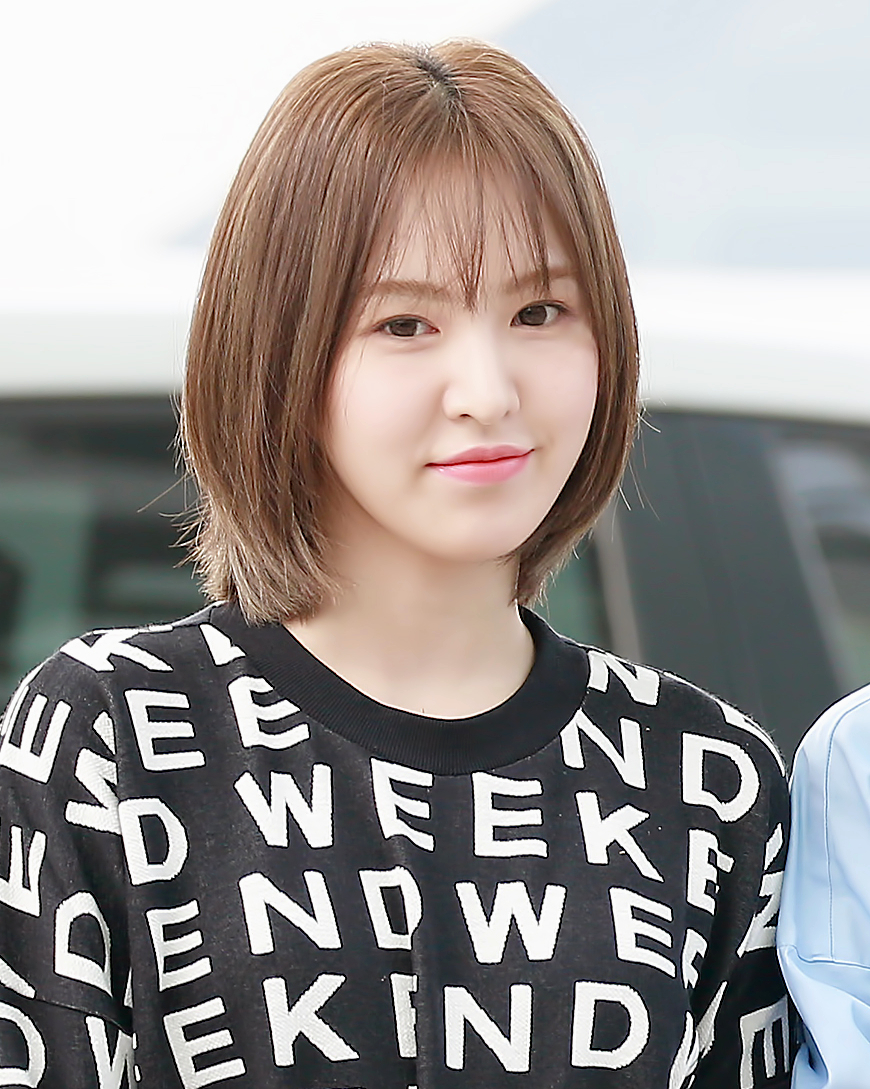
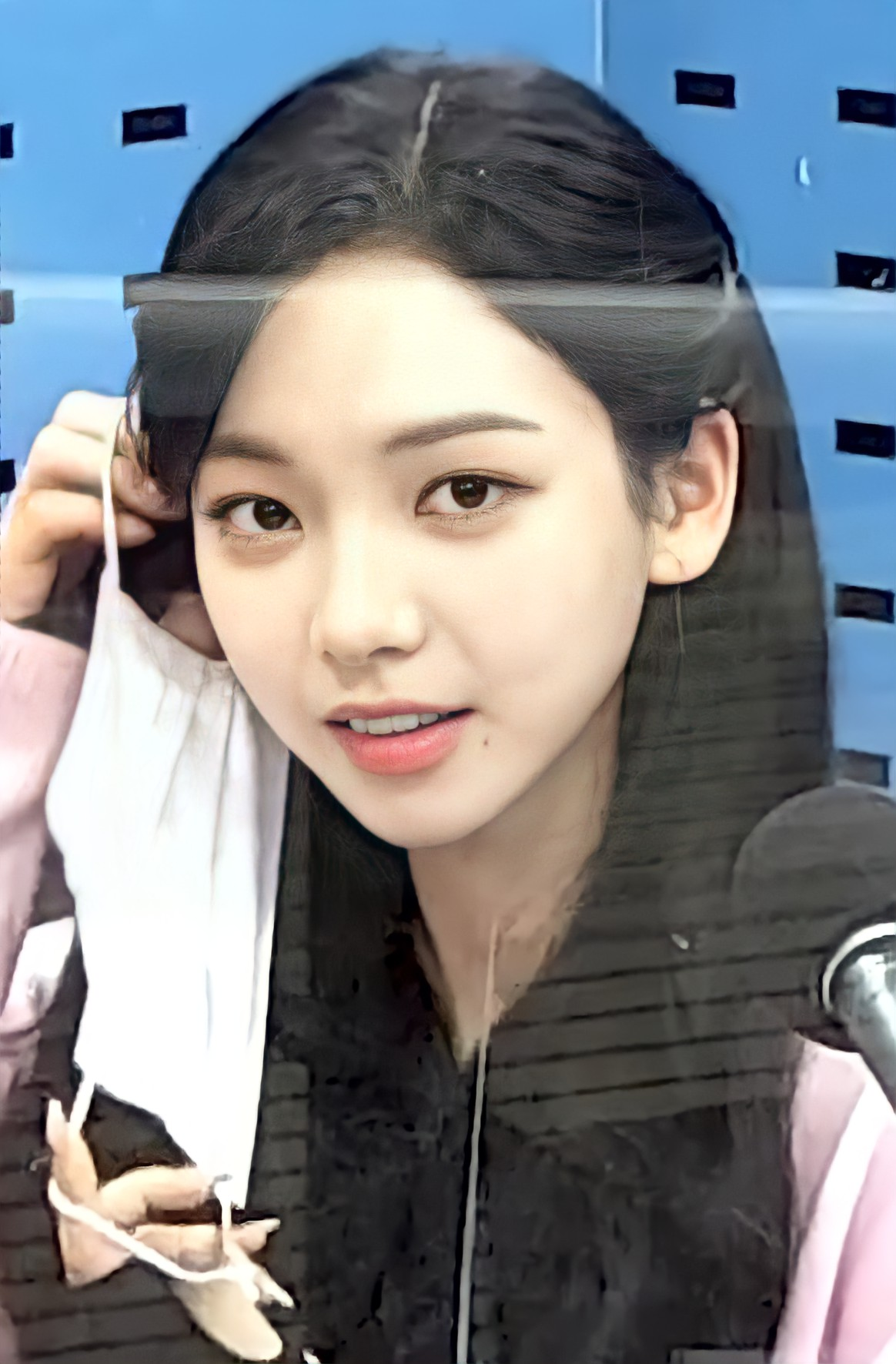
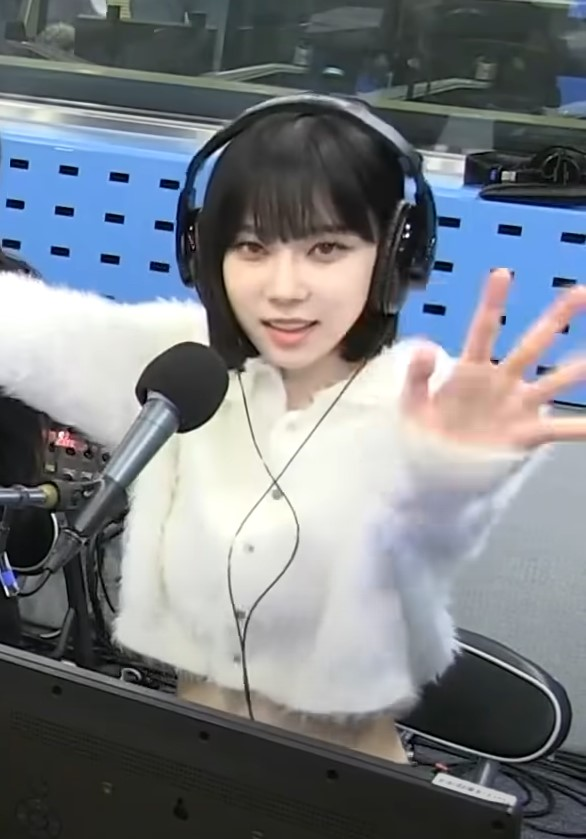
Got the Beat earned their first-ever music show win with their Inkigayo trophy for "Step Back". Member Taeyeon (second from top left) also received a triple crown for "INVU".

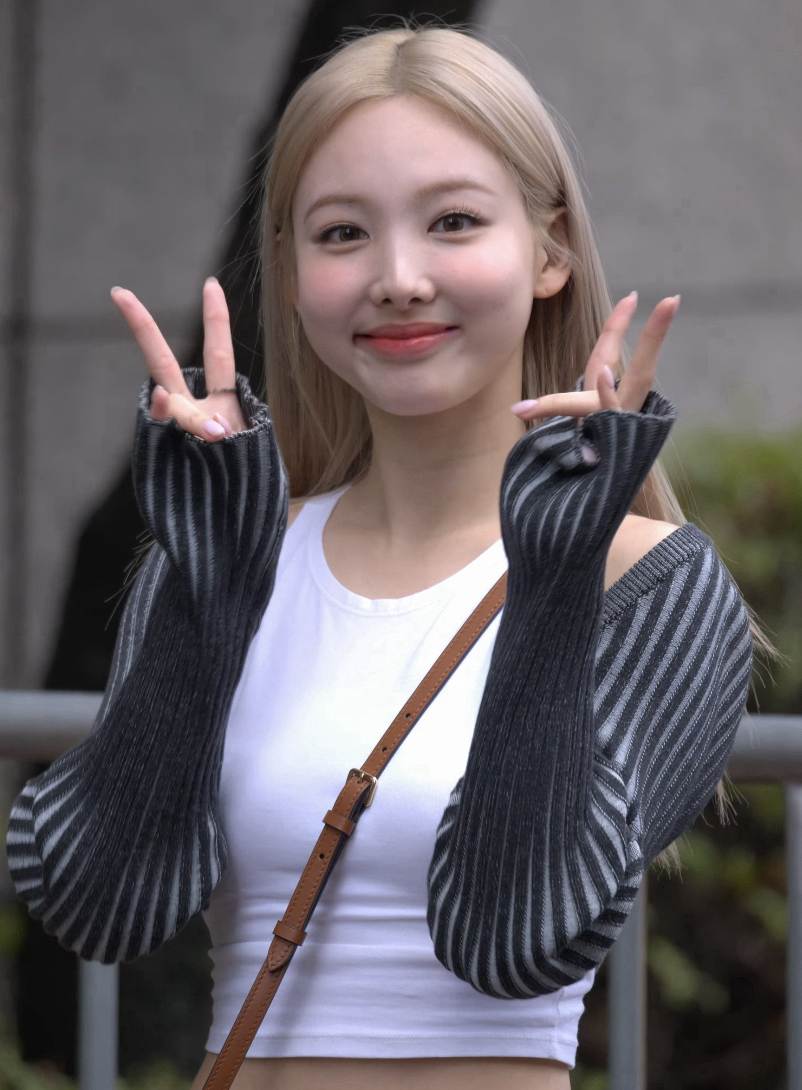
Twice's Nayeon received her first-ever music show trophy as a soloist on Inkigayo with "Pop!". The single went on to achieve a triple crown.

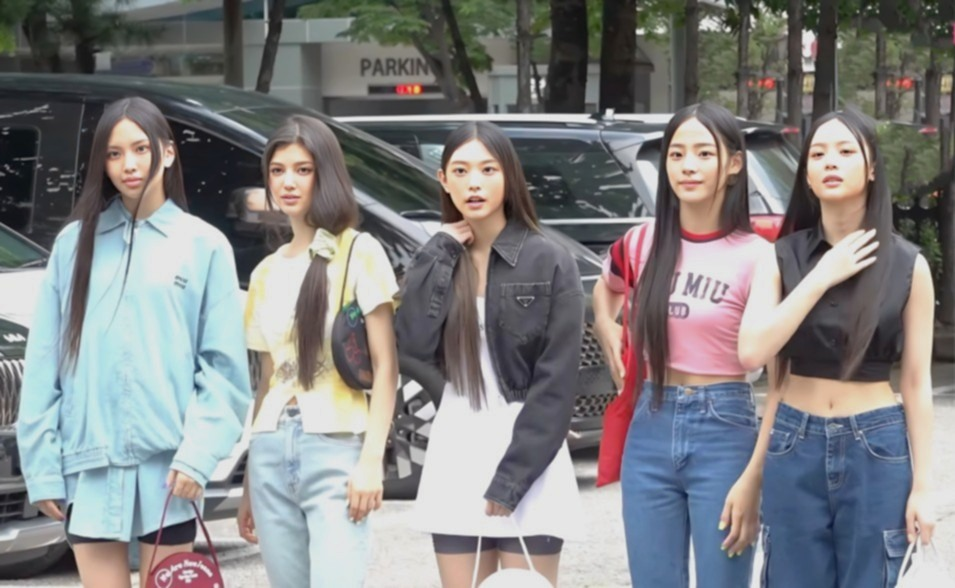
NewJeans received their first Inkigayo award for "Attention".

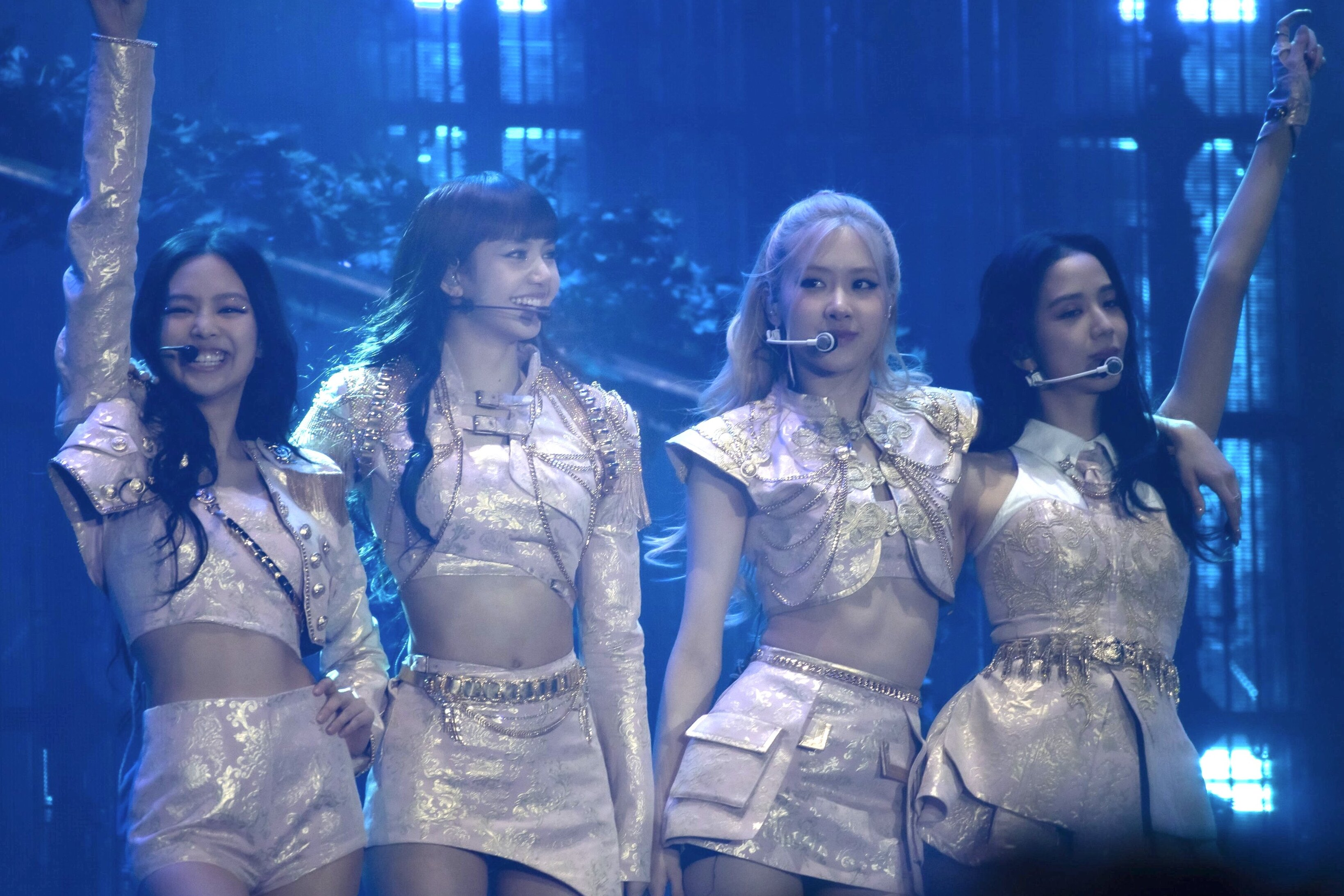
Blackpink earned two triple crowns with "Pink Venom" and "Shut Down".

Key
†	Indicates the song achieved a triple crown
‡	Indicates the highest score of the year
—	No show was held

Chart history
Episode	Date	Artist	Song	Points	Ref.
—	January 2	No show, winner not announced			
1,121	January 9	Ive	"Eleven" †	8,533	
1,122	January 16	Ive	"Eleven" †	6,583	
1,123	January 23	Ive	"Eleven" †	5,927	
1,124	January 30	Got the Beat	"Step Back"	5,612	
—	February 6	No show, winner not announced			
—	February 13	No show, winner not announced			
1,125	February 20	Got the Beat	"Step Back"	7,224	
1,126	February 27	Taeyeon	"INVU" †	7,041	
1,127	March 6	Taeyeon	"INVU" †	6,783	
1,128	March 13	Taeyeon	"INVU" †	7,083	
1,129	March 20	Kim Min-seok	"Drunken Confession"	5,514	
1,130	March 27	(G)I-dle	"Tomboy" †	8,037	
1,131	April 3	(G)I-dle	"Tomboy" †	9,648 ‡	
1,132	April 10	NCT Dream	"Glitch Mode"	6,845	
1,133	April 17	Big Bang	"Still Life" †	8,673	
1,134	April 24	Big Bang	"Still Life" †	9,394	
1,135	May 1	Big Bang	"Still Life" †	8,681	
1,136	May 8	Ive	"Love Dive" †	6,726	
1,137	May 15	Psy	"That That" †	9,402	
1,138	May 22	Psy	"That That" †	9,108	
1,139	May 29	Psy	"That That" †	7,620	
1,140	June 5	(G)I-dle	"Tomboy" †	6,314	
1,141	June 12	NCT Dream	"Beatbox"	7,292	
1,142	June 19	BTS	"Yet to Come"	7,007	
1,143	June 26	BTS	"Yet to Come"	9,479	
1,144	July 3	Ive	"Love Dive" †	6,126	
1,145	July 10	Nayeon	"Pop!" †	6,922	
1,146	July 17	Ive	"Love Dive" †	5,955	
1,147	July 24	Nayeon	"Pop!" †	7,103	
1,148	July 31	Seventeen	"_World"	7,092	
1,149	August 7	Nayeon	"Pop!" †	7,201	
1,150	August 14	Itzy	"Sneakers"	7,353	
1,151	August 21	NewJeans	"Attention"	8,273	
1,152	August 28	NewJeans	"Attention"	6,300	
1,153	September 4	Blackpink	"Pink Venom" †	9,292	
—	September 11	No show, winner not announced			
1,154	September 18	Blackpink	"Pink Venom" †	7,977	
1,155	September 25	Blackpink	"Pink Venom" †	7,129	
1,156	October 2	Blackpink	"Shut Down" †	9,077	
1,157	October 9	Blackpink	"Shut Down" †	8,991	
1,158	October 16	Blackpink	"Shut Down" †	7,641	
1,159	October 23	Ive	"After Like"	7,038	
—	October 30	No show, winner not announced			
1,160	November 6	(G)I-dle	"Nxde" †	9,409	
1,161	November 13	(G)I-dle	"Nxde" †	9,164	
1,162	November 20	(G)I-dle	"Nxde" †	6,624	
1,163	November 27	Younha	"Event Horizon" †	6,482	
1,164	December 4	Younha	"Event Horizon" †	6,319	
1,165	December 11	Younha	"Event Horizon" †	6,164	
—	December 18	No show, winner not announced			
—	December 25	No show, winner not announced			
