= Shut Down (Blackpink song) =

- Promotional graphic

Single by Blackpink

from the album Born Pink
- Language: Korean; English
- Released: September 16, 2022
- Studio: The Black Label (Seoul)
- Genre: Hip-hop
- Length: 2:56
- Label: YG; Interscope
- Composers: Teddy; 24
- Lyricists: Teddy; Danny Chung; Vince

Blackpink singles chronology
"Pink Venom" (2022)	"Shut Down" (2022)	"The Girls" (2023)

Music video
- "Shut Down" on YouTube

"Shut Down" is a song recorded by South Korean girl group Blackpink. It was released on September 16, 2022, through YG Entertainment and Interscope Records, as the second single from the group's second studio album, Born Pink (2022). The song was composed by Teddy and 24, with its lyrics penned by Teddy, Danny Chung, and Vince. It is primarily a hip-hop song driven by trap beats and a looped classical violin sample of Niccolò Paganini's "La Campanella", with lyrics dismissing the group's haters. The song was Blackpink's final single release under Interscope Records, ahead of their departure from the label in 2025.

"Shut Down" was a commercial success and became Blackpink's second number-one hit on the Billboard Global 200 as well as the first song by a K-pop act to top Spotify's weekly chart. In South Korea, the track peaked at number three on the Circle Digital Chart, while it entered the US Billboard Hot 100 at number 25 and the UK Singles Chart at number 24. The song also topped the charts in Hong Kong, Indonesia, Malaysia, Philippines, Singapore, Taiwan, and Vietnam, and entered the top ten in Australia, Canada, New Zealand, India, and South Korea. It was later certified platinum in South Korea and Canada, gold in Australia, Japan, and New Zealand, and silver in the United Kingdom.

"Shut Down" received positive reviews from critics, who praised the memorable production and confident lyrics and deemed it a career highlight, while some criticized the classical sample as an overused K-pop technique. An accompanying music video for the song was uploaded onto Blackpink's YouTube channel simultaneously with the single's release. The video references the group's previous videos, mirroring scenes from "Playing with Fire," "Whistle," "Ddu-Du Ddu-Du," "Boombayah," and "Kill This Love." Blackpink promoted "Shut Down" with performances on Jimmy Kimmel Live! and the South Korean music program Inkigayo, as well as the Born Pink World Tour.

== Background ==
On July 31, 2022, a teaser video was uploaded on Blackpink's social media accounts, announcing the release of a new album in September, preceded by the pre-release single "Pink Venom" on August 19. On August 24, YG Entertainment announced that Blackpink was filming the music video for their second album's lead single in Gyeonggi Province, South Korea. The label stated that the group was preparing for their world tour and teased their next single: "they are working hard on a schedule to fulfill their promises to their fans … all the songs on the album are the crystals that will write a new story for Blackpink, but the title song in particular will be a song that will surprise world music fans. The music video will also elevate the status of K-Pop with a difference that has never been seen before."

On September 6, 2022, the title poster for the second single, "Shut Down", was released on Blackpink's social media accounts. From September 10 to 13, promotional posters of the song featuring each of the members were released. On September 13, a teaser for the music video was released, and the official music video was released on September 16.

== Composition ==
"Shut Down"
A 17-second sample of the chorus of "Shut Down", which shows the song's sampling of "La Campanella" and characteristic combination of violin and hip-hop sounds.

"Shut Down" is a hip-hop-based track that features strings, an insistent bass sound, a trap beat and a "crazy loop" of classical violin. It samples the beginning of the third movement of Italian composer Niccolò Paganini's second violin concerto, commonly known as "La Campanella". YG Entertainment described the song's title as "intuitive but strangely tense." Unlike the original piece, which was composed in the key of B minor, "Shut Down" was composed in the key of B-flat minor with a tempo of 110 beats per minute. The song was described as "powerful, rap-focused, and filled with references to [Blackpink's] past works." Lyrically, "Shut Down" shows the members response to the criticism from their haters. Elle's Erica Gonzales wrote that "throughout the track, the girls take turns telling their haters and doubters to take a seat".

== Critical reception ==
"Shut Down" was met with positive reviews from critics. Glenn Rowley writing for Billboard called it one of the best songs of 2022, praising its "swagger and savvy", and the melding of classical music and hip-hop as "ingenious." Clash named "Shut Down" a "triumph" and praised the commanding presence of the members on the track, particularly Jisoo's surprise rap verse. Writing for Cosmopolitan, Aedan Juvet opined that the string-based production "perfectly matches" the shade-throwing lyrics of the song. Benedetta Geddo of The Mary Sue deemed "Shut Down" not just the highlight of the album, but also one of the best songs of Blackpink's entire career. Maddy Myer writing for Teen Vogue hailed the song as an "effective ode to their haters" and "a musical masterpiece" due to its captivating production and pointed lyrics. However, Pitchfork's Alex Ramos criticized the use of a classical sample as a "tried-and-true K-pop technique" that did not break new ground.

Year-end lists
Critic/Publication	List	Rank	Ref.
Billboard	The 100 Best Songs of 2022	91	
Cosmopolitan	The 15 Best K-pop Songs of 2022, Ranked	12	
Dazed	The best K-pop tracks of 2022	23	
Hypebae	Best K-pop Songs and Music Videos of 2022	—	
The Mary Sue	Eleven of the Best K-pop Songs of 2022, Ranked	4	
SCMP	15 best K-pop songs of 2022	10	
Teen Vogue	The 79 Best K-pop Songs of 2022	—	
Teen Vogue	21 Best K-pop Music Videos of 2022	—	

== Accolades ==
"Shut Down" won 10 music program awards in South Korea, including triple crowns (or three wins) on Show Champion, M Countdown, and Inkigayo. It received three weekly Melon Popularity Awards on September 26, October 3, and October 10, 2022.

Awards and nominations for "Shut Down"
Year	Organization	Award	Result	Ref.
2023	BreakTudo Awards	International Music Video	Nominated	
2023	Circle Chart Music Awards	Artist of the Year – Global Digital Music (September)	Won	

Music program awards
Program	Date	Ref.
Show Champion	September 21, 2022	
Show Champion	September 28, 2022	
Show Champion	October 5, 2022	
M Countdown	September 22, 2022	
M Countdown	September 29, 2022	
M Countdown	October 6, 2022	
Inkigayo	October 2, 2022	
Inkigayo	October 9, 2022	
Inkigayo	October 16, 2022	
Show! Music Core	October 8, 2022	

== Commercial performance ==
"Shut Down" debuted at number one on the Billboard Global 200 with 152.8 million streams and 17,000 downloads sold, earning Blackpink their second number-one hit on the chart after "Pink Venom". The group joined BTS, Justin Bieber and Olivia Rodrigo as the only acts with multiple leaders on the chart. With "Pink Venom" at number two, Blackpink also became the first group to hold the top two spots in a single week on the Global 200. "Shut Down" debuted at number one on the Global Excl. US with 140 million streams and 13,000 downloads sold outside the US, earning Blackpink their third number-one hit on the chart after "Lovesick Girls" and "Pink Venom". With this, Blackpink became the artist with the second-most number-one hits on the chart after BTS. The group also became the fourth act to debut atop the Global 200, Global Excl. US and Billboard 200 charts simultaneously with "Shut Down" and its parent album Born Pink. BTS, Justin Bieber and Taylor Swift are the only other acts that have achieved this feat. "Shut Down" charted on the Global 200 for 29 weeks and the Global Excl. US for 42 weeks.

In South Korea, "Shut Down" debuted at number 29 on the week 38 issue of the Circle Digital Chart for the period dated September 11–17, with less than two days of tracking. It peaked at number three the following week, for the period dated September 18–24. In the United States, the song entered the Billboard Hot 100 at number 25 for the week of September 16–22. It earned 4,000 downloads and debuted at number ten on Streaming Songs with 13 million streams, becoming the group's third top-ten on the chart and second completely solo. With this, Blackpink became the first girl group to have multiple top tens, and tied with Psy for the second-most top tens by a Korean act. They also became the first Korean act to have a non-compilation album yield multiple top tens on the chart. "Shut Down" also debuted at number 24 on the UK Singles Chart, marking the group's eighth top-forty hit in the country.

== Music video ==
A teaser for the music video of "Shut Down" was released on September 13, 2022, and the official music video was released on September 16, 2022. It surpassed 100 million views in five days and three hours.

A scene in the music video where Jennie raps while sitting on a diamond-encrusted M48 patton tank, referencing "Ddu-Du Ddu-Du"

The video references previous music videos released by Blackpink. In the opening shot of the video, Lisa stands on a deck against a dark sky ("Playing with Fire") before taking the wheel for a group car ride, mirroring a scene from "Whistle" in which Rosé drove. The scene in "Ddu-Du Ddu-Du" of Jennie rapping while sitting on a military tank with pink shopping bags is also recreated. Lisa raps sitting among black bags full of pink cash and speakers ("Boombayah"). Jisoo protects herself from raining money with a pink umbrella ("Ddu-Du Ddu-Du"). Just as in "Whistle", Rosé sits on top of the Earth, except the globe in "Shut Down" is black and pink. In another scene, she drives a car alone ("Kill This Love"). In "Playing with Fire", Jennie plays with a match with orange flame in a white bathtub; in "Shut Down", she does the same in an onyx bathtub and with a pink flame. Lisa wields a sword with the word "Blackpink" on it, and Rosé swings on a chandelier ("Ddu-Du Ddu-Du"). Jisoo trips and falls in front of paparazzi filming her every move in "Ddu-Du Ddu-Du", but confidently takes pictures of herself without the glaring eyes of the photographers in "Shut Down". During the chorus, the members dance in an alley lined with posters referencing the titles of their solo and group songs.

=== Dance performance video ===
The dance performance video was additionally released on September 18, 2022; the video consists of the four members doing the full choreography in matching black outfits in front of a set decorated with silver shutters, giving a sense of immersion and establishing the concept of the music video. Later, the girls were joined by a series of dancers in gray outfits. The dancers then joined the quartet for the finishing final poses.

The performance was choreographed by Kiel Tutin, Taryn Cheng, Lee Jeong (Ri Jeong), and Kyle Hanagami, of the choreography team YGX. The choreographers noted: "We emphasized Blackpink's unique strong hip-hop swag. Also, we maximized the core points of the performance and the colorful charms of the members."

== Live performances and promotion ==
On September 16, 2022, the group held a livestream on their official YouTube channel, one hour before the release of Born Pink, on a large stage themed after the concept of "Shut Down". In the broadcast, the members revealed behind-the-scenes stories of the music video filming, future activities and sneak peeks of the Born Pink World Tour, and they introduced the new songs on the album. On the same day, the group gave interviews on US radio stations SiriusXM and 102.7 KIIS FM. On September 19, they performed the song live for the first time on Jimmy Kimmel Live! on ABC, and on September 25, they appeared on SBS's Inkigayo to perform the song for the first time on a South Korean music program. "Shut Down" was included in the setlist of Blackpink's Born Pink World Tour, which started in October 2022. On January 28, 2023, the group performed the song with Swedish violinist Daniel Lozakovich at the Le Gala des Pièces Jaunes charity event organized by the First Lady of France, Brigitte Macron, in Paris. In April and June 2023, Blackpink performed "Shut Down" during their headlining sets at the Coachella Valley Music and Arts Festival in Indio, California and BST Hyde Park in London.

== Usage in media ==
La Poem, who is part of Yoo Se-yoon's team, covered "Shut Down" on the fifth episode of the South Korean reality show Webtoon Singer. The show features K-pop artists' performances combining webtoons with extended reality.

== Credits and personnel ==
Credits adapted from the liner notes of Born Pink.

Recording

- Recorded at The Black Label Studio (Seoul)
- Mixed at Gudwin Music Group Inc
- Mastered at Sterling Sound (New York City)

Personnel

- Blackpink – vocals
- Teddy – lyricist, composer
- Danny Chung – lyricist
- Vince – lyricist
- 24 – composer, arranger
- Youngju Bang – recording engineer
- Josh Gudwin – mixing engineer
- Chris Gehringer – mastering engineer

== Charts ==
=== Weekly charts ===
Weekly chart performance
Chart (2022–2024)	Peak position
Argentina Hot 100 (Billboard)	36
Australia (ARIA)	5
Austria (Ö3 Austria Top 40)	24
Canada Hot 100 (Billboard)	7
Croatia (Billboard)	20
Czech Republic Singles Digital (ČNS IFPI)	40
France (SNEP)	51
Germany (GfK)	31
Global 200 (Billboard)	1
Greece International (IFPI)	8
Hong Kong (Billboard)	1
Hungary (Single Top 40)	3
Hungary (Stream Top 40)	34
India International (IMI)	4
Indonesia (Billboard)	1
Ireland (IRMA)	32
Japan Hot 100 (Billboard)	15
Japan Combined Singles (Oricon)	23
Lithuania (AGATA)	11
Luxembourg (Billboard)	18
Malaysia (Billboard)	1
Netherlands (Single Top 100)	79
Netherlands (Global Top 40)	1
New Zealand (Recorded Music NZ)	6
Panama (PRODUCE)	20
Peru (Billboard)	16
Philippines (Billboard)	1
Portugal (AFP)	22
Romania (Billboard)	20
Singapore (RIAS)	1
Slovakia (Singles Digitál Top 100)	17
South Africa Streaming (TOSAC)	45
South Korea (Circle)	3
Spain (PROMUSICAE)	82
Sweden (Sverigetopplistan)	92
Switzerland (Schweizer Hitparade)	37
Taiwan (Billboard)	1
Turkey (Billboard)	22
UK Singles (Official Charts)	24
US Billboard Hot 100	25
US World Digital Song Sales (Billboard)	1
Vietnam Hot 100 (Billboard)	1

=== Monthly charts ===
Monthly chart performance
Chart (2022)	Peak position
South Korea (Circle)	5

=== Year-end charts ===
2022 year-end chart performance
Chart (2022)	Position
Global 200 (Billboard)	180
South Korea (Circle)	79
Vietnam (Vietnam Hot 100)	32

2023 year-end chart performance
Chart (2023)	Position
Global 200 (Billboard)	188
South Korea (Circle)	52

== Certifications ==
Certifications
Region	Certification	Certified units/sales
Australia (ARIA)	Gold	35,000^{‡}
Brazil (Pro-Música Brasil)	Diamond	160,000^{‡}
Canada (Music Canada)	Platinum	80,000^{‡}
France (SNEP)	Gold	100,000^{‡}
New Zealand (RMNZ)	Gold	15,000^{‡}
United Kingdom (BPI)	Silver	200,000^{‡}
Streaming
Japan (RIAJ)	Gold	50,000,000^{†}
South Korea (KMCA)	Platinum	100,000,000^{†}
^{‡} Sales+streaming figures based on certification alone.^{†} Streaming-only figures based on certification alone.

== Release history ==
Release dates and formats for "Shut Down"
Region	Date	Format	Label	Ref.
Various	September 16, 2022	Digital download; streaming	YG; Interscope	
Italy	October 7, 2022	Radio airplay	Universal	

== See also ==
- List of best-selling girl group singles
- List of Billboard Global 200 number ones of 2022
- List of Billboard Global 200 top-ten singles in 2022
- List of certified songs in South Korea
- List of Inkigayo Chart winners (2022)
- List of K-pop songs on the Billboard charts
- List of M Countdown Chart winners (2022)
- List of number-one songs of 2022 (Hong Kong)
- List of number-one songs of 2022 (Malaysia)
- List of number-one songs of 2022 (Philippines)
- List of number-one songs of 2022 (Singapore)
- List of number-one songs of 2022 (Vietnam)
- List of Show Champion Chart winners (2022)
- List of Show! Music Core Chart winners (2022)
- List of top 10 singles for 2022 in Australia
