= Andrea (Bad Bunny and Buscabulla song) =

Song by Bad Bunny and Buscabulla

from the album Un Verano Sin Ti
- Language: Spanish
- Released: May 6, 2022
- Genre: Conscious rap; indie pop; synth-pop; psychedelia; reggaeton
- Length: 5:39
- Label: Rimas
- Songwriters: Benito Martínez; Mag; Roberto Rosado; Luis del Valle; Raquel Berríos; Martin Coogan; Scott Dittrich
- Producers: Mag; Luis del Valle; Raquel Berríos; Martin Coogan; Scott Dittrich

Visualizer
- " Bad Bunny (ft. Buscabulla) - Andrea (360° Visualizer)" on YouTube

"Andrea" is a song by Puerto Rican rapper Bad Bunny from his fifth studio album Un Verano Sin Ti (2022), featuring indie-pop duo Buscabulla. The song was written by Benito Martínez along with Buscabulla, who handle the production too along with Mag.

The song touches on themes of female empowerment by using the character of Andrea, a sex worker. The lyrics are focused on her wanting a better quality partner and aiming more for herself than Puerto Rico has to offer for her. While it was rumored that the song was about Andrea Ruiz, a woman murdered by her ex-boyfriend, Benito has denied these rumors.

== Promotion and release ==
On May 2, 2022, Bad Bunny announced his fifth studio album, Un Verano Sin Ti, on which the song appears nineteenth on the tracklist. On May 6, 2022, "Andrea" was released alongside the rest of Un Verano Sin Ti through Rimas Entertainment.

== Commercial performance ==
Along with the rest of Un Verano Sin Ti, "Andrea" charted on the Billboard Hot 100, peaking at number 51. It also performed well on the Billboard Global 200 along with the rest of the aforementioned album, charting at number 24 while also charting at 27 on the Billboard Global 200 Excl. US chart. On the US Hot Latin Songs chart, the track peaked at number 21.

== Audio visualizer ==
A 360° audio visualizer for the song was uploaded to YouTube on May 6, 2022, along with the other audio visualizer videos of the songs that appeared on Un Verano Sin Ti.

== Charts ==
=== Weekly charts ===
Chart performance for "Andrea"
Chart (2022)	Peak position
Argentina Hot 100 (Billboard)	64
Bolivia (Billboard)	13
Chile (Billboard)	25
Costa Rica (FONOTICA)	17
Colombia (Billboard)	14
Ecuador (Billboard)	13
Global 200 (Billboard)	24
Mexico (Billboard)	9
Peru (Billboard)	19
Spain (PROMUSICAE)	20
US Billboard Hot 100	51
US Hot Latin Songs (Billboard)	15

=== Year-end charts ===
2022 year-end chart performance for "Andrea"
Chart (2022)	Position
US Hot Latin Songs (Billboard)	22

== Certifications ==
Certifications for "Andrea"
Region	Certification	Certified units/sales
Spain (PROMUSICAE)	Platinum	60,000^{‡}
^{‡} Sales+streaming figures based on certification alone.
