= Tarot (song) =

Song by Bad Bunny and Jhayco

from the album Un Verano Sin Ti
- Language: Spanish
- Released: May 6, 2022
- Length: 3:57
- Label: Rimas
- Songwriters: Benito Martínez; Jesús Nieves
- Producers: Tainy; La Paciencia; Albert Hype; Jota Rosa

Visualizer
- "Bad Bunny (ft. Jhay Cortez) - Tarot (360° Visualizer)" on YouTube

"Tarot" is a song by Puerto Rican singers and rappers Bad Bunny and Jhayco from the former's fifth studio album Un Verano Sin Ti (2022), on which it appears as the seventh track. It was released on May 6, 2022, by Rimas Entertainment alongside the rest of the album. The song was written by the performers while its production was handled by Tainy, La Paciencia, Albert Hype and Jota Rosa. This marks the fourth time Bad Bunny and Jhayco collaborated each other, following the remix version of "No Me Conoce", "Cómo Se Siente" and "Dakiti". The song's title refers to the pack of playing cards of the same name.

== Critical reception ==
"Tarot" was ranked by Billboard as the seventh and least best collaboration song from Un Verano Sin Ti. The magazine called it "an infectious EDM track about a girl who's the center of attention. While we would've really appreciated hearing the hitmakers explore new sounds in this album's collab, why deviate from something that's worked for them in the past, right?"

== Commercial performance ==
"Tarot", along with the other twenty-two tracks on Un Verano Sin Ti, charted on the Billboard Hot 100, peaking at number 18. It also performed well on the Billboard Global 200, charting at number 9, and on the US Hot Latin Songs chart, where it peaked at number 7.

== Audio visualizer ==
A 360° audio visualizer for the song was uploaded to YouTube on May 6, 2022, along with the other audio visualizer videos of the songs that appeared on Un Verano Sin Ti.

== Charts ==
=== Weekly charts ===
Weekly chart performance for "Tarot"
Chart (2022)	Peak position
Argentina Hot 100 (Billboard)	41
Bolivia (Billboard)	7
Chile (Billboard)	7
Colombia (Billboard)	7
Costa Rica (FONOTICA)	5
Ecuador (Billboard)	8
Global 200 (Billboard)	9
Mexico (Billboard)	7
Mexico Streaming (AMPROFON)	9
Peru (Billboard)	9
Portugal (AFP)	120
Spain (Promusicae)	2
US Billboard Hot 100	18
US Hot Latin Songs (Billboard)	7

=== Year-end charts ===
2022 year-end chart performance for "Tarot"
Chart (2022)	Position
Global 200 (Billboard)	71
Spain (PROMUSICAE)	15
US Hot Latin Songs (Billboard)	11
US Streaming Songs (Billboard)	65

== Certifications ==
Certifications and sales for "Tarot"
Region	Certification	Certified units/sales
Italy (FIMI)	Gold	50,000^{‡}
Spain (Promusicae)	6× Platinum	600,000^{‡}
^{‡} Sales+streaming figures based on certification alone.
