= All Too Well (disambiguation) =

"All Too Well" is a 2012 and 2021 song by Taylor Swift.

All Too Well may also refer to:

- All Too Well: The Short Film, a 2021 short film written and directed by Taylor Swift
- "All Too Well", a 1935 song by Charles LaVere & His Chicagoans
- "All Too Well", a 1998 song by Joydrop
