= Taylor Swift Productions =

American production company

Taylor Swift Productions, Inc.
- Type: Private
- Industry: Visual media
- Founded: 2008; 18 years ago
- Founder: Taylor Swift
- Headquarters: United States

Taylor Swift Productions, Inc. is the in-house visual media production company of the American singer-songwriter Taylor Swift. It was founded in 2008, being first credited in the concert film Speak Now World Tour – Live (2011). Taylor Swift Productions has produced all of Swift's films and documentaries since 2018, as well as her music videos starting in 2022. Several management consultants have praised the company's business and marketing strategies as smart and innovative.

Its films Taylor Swift: Reputation Stadium Tour (2018), Folklore: The Long Pond Studio Sessions (2020), All Too Well: The Short Film (2021), and Taylor Swift: The Eras Tour (2023) were met with acclaim from critics. The theatrical releases Taylor Swift: The Eras Tour and Taylor Swift: The Official Release Party of a Showgirl (2025) topped the North American box office; the former became the highest grossing concert film of all-time and was nominated for the Golden Globe Award for Cinematic and Box Office Achievement.

The studio's outputs have received various accolades, including an Art Directors Guild Award, a Gracie Award, an Eddie Award, a Hollywood Critics Association Film Award, and a Camerimage Grand Prize. All Too Well: The Short Film, "Anti-Hero" (2022), and "Fortnight" (2024) received the MTV Video Music Award for Video of the Year, with the foremost also winning the Grammy Award for Best Music Video.

== Background ==
Taylor Swift has expressed that she views visual media as an important element in her songwriting process. As her career progressed, she delved into film treatment, filmmaking, screenwriting, directing, and producing. Several directors whom Swift has collaborated with, including Roman White and Joseph Kahn, have praised her involvement in creating her music videos. In 2015, she won the Primetime Emmy Award for Outstanding Emerging Media Program in the category "Outstanding Creative Achievement in Interactive Media — Original Interactive Program" as the executive producer for the interactive app AMEX Unstaged: Taylor Swift Experience, which gave viewers access to a customizable 360° view of the music video for "Blank Space" (2014). Swift produced the music video for "Bad Blood" (2015), which won the Grammy Award for Best Music Video in 2016.

== History ==
In February 2008, Swift launched her in-house production company, Taylor Swift Productions, Inc., which was first credited in the concert film Speak Now World Tour – Live (2011). The studio's next release was the television special Taylor Swift: The Road to Reputation, documenting her career and the Reputation Stadium Tour shows in the United States. It aired on the Australian TV channels Eleven and Network Ten in September 2018. Taylor Swift Productions produced the concert film Taylor Swift: Reputation Stadium Tour, released on Netflix on the New Year's Eve of 2018. Directed by Paul Dugdale, Reputation Stadium Tour received acclaim from critics, who praised its direction, production, camerawork, and Swift's stage presence. The film's production designers, Tamlyn Wright and Baz Halpin, were both nominated at the 24th Art Directors Guild Annual Awards for Excellence in Production Design in the category "Variety, Reality or Event Special". The film's producer, Simon Fisher, and Dugdale were both nominated for Best Multicamera Work at the 2019 Royal Television Society Craft & Design Awards.

The studio's next feature release, the television special Taylor Swift: City of Lover, aired on ABC on May 17, 2020, and was made available for on-demand streaming on Hulu and Disney+ the following day. Critics complimented City of Lover for its intimate setting and Swift's storytelling abilities, but felt that its 42-minute runtime was too short. The film's ABC premiere attracted 3.63 million viewers. Swift made her debut as a film director with the documentary Folklore: The Long Pond Studio Sessions, released on November 25, 2020. It features Swift performing all of the 17 tracks of her eighth studio album, Folklore (2020), and discussing the creative process and inspirations behind the songs. Produced by Taylor Swift Productions and distributed by Disney+, Folklore: The Long Pond Studio Sessions received acclaim from critics for its performances, intimacy, and conversations regarding Folklore's creative process. (Note: Attributed to multiple references:) On the review aggregator website Rotten Tomatoes, the film has an approval rating of 100% based on 13 critics' reviews. The film received the Grand Award for Special or Variety at the 46th Gracie Awards.

Swift made her filmmaking debut with the romantic drama All Too Well: The Short Film (2021), an adaptation of her critically-acclaimed song "All Too Well (10 Minute Version)" (2021). Produced by Taylor Swift Productions and starring Sadie Sink and Dylan O'Brien, the film received a limited theatrical release through Universal Pictures and special screenings at the 2022 Tribeca and Toronto film festivals. All Too Well: The Short Film was met with widespread acclaim from film critics, (Note: Attributed to multiple references:) with praise for Swift's vision as a filmmaker. It made Swift the first artist to win the MTV Video Music Award for Video of the Year three times (Note: Swift previously won for "Bad Blood" in 2015 and "You Need to Calm Down" in 2019.) and the first artist to win for a self-directed project, winning the category in 2022. In 2023, she became the first artist to win the Grammy Award for Best Music Video with a sole directing credit. The film also won Best Music Video at the 26th Art Directors Guild Annual Awards for Excellence in Production Design and Best Short Film at the 6th Hollywood Critics Association Film Awards.

Throughout 2022 and 2023, Taylor Swift Productions produced the music videos for Swift's songs "Anti-Hero", "Bejeweled", "Lavender Haze", "Karma", and "I Can See You". For the music video for the lattermost, Swift stated that she wanted to create a visual story that depicted how her fans helped her reclaim her music following her masters dispute. The video stars Joey King, Taylor Lautner, and Presley Cash. The music video for "Anti-Hero" won the MTV Video Music Award for Video of the Year in 2023, making Swift the first artist to win the award two years in a row.

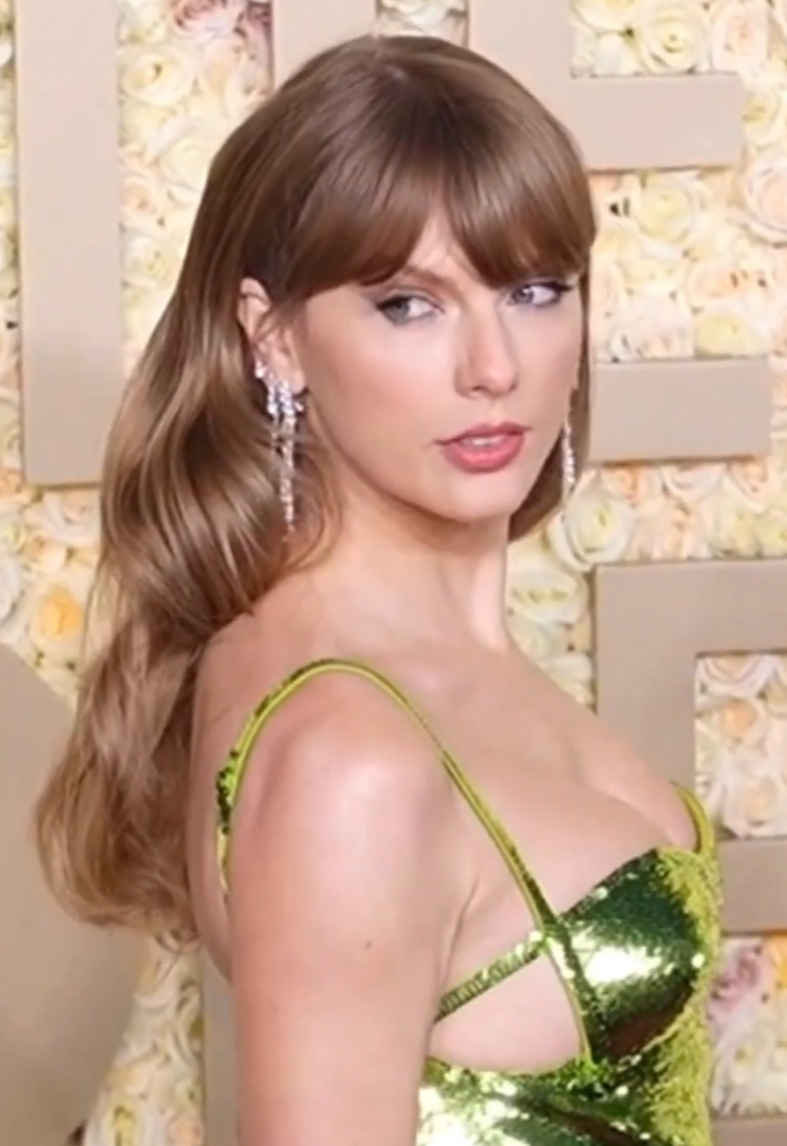
Taylor Swift at the 2024 Golden Globe Awards

Taylor Swift Productions independently produced the concert film Taylor Swift: The Eras Tour, directed by Sam Wrench and distributed globally in cinemas by AMC Theatres, Variance Films, and Trafalgar Releasing. Released on October 13, 2023, the film received acclaim from critics, who praised for its cinematography, spectacle, and energy. It topped the North American box office and became the highest-grossing concert film of all-time, earning over $267 million globally against a production budget of $15 million. On December 13, The Eras Tour was made available to rent for on-demand streaming, in collaboration with Universal Pictures Home Entertainment. An extended cut of the film, subtitled (Taylor's Version), was released on Disney+ in March 2024. The Eras Tour was nominated for Cinematic and Box Office Achievement at the 81st Golden Globe Awards and Best Music Documentary at the 8th Critics' Choice Documentary Awards. It won Best Edited Variety Talk/Sketch Show or Special at the 74th American Cinema Editors Eddie Awards.

In 2024, Taylor Swift Productions produced the music video for Swift's single "Fortnight", starring Ethan Hawke and Josh Charles and featuring cinematography by Rodrigo Prieto. It made Swift the first artist to win the MTV Video Music Award for Video of the Year for three consecutive years and earned Prieto a Camerimage Grand Prize. In 2025, Taylor Swift Productions produced the films Taylor Swift: The Official Release Party of a Showgirl and Taylor Swift: The Eras Tour: The Final Show, as well as the music video for Swift's single "The Fate of Ophelia". The Official Release Party of a Showgirl showcases the music video for "The Fate of Ophelia", its behind-the-scenes footage, lyric videos from Swift's album The Life of a Showgirl, and her commentary on the songs. It received a limited theatrical release on October 3–5, topping the North American box office and earning over $50 million globally. The Eras Tour: The Final Show, directed by Glenn Weiss, was released on December 12 through Disney+. Taylor Swift Productions produced the music video for Swift's single "Opalite" in 2026.

== Reception ==
Several management consultants have praised and discussed Taylor Swift Productions' outputs and marketing strategies. Julia Dhar of Forbes said Swift and the company are "no slouches" in marketing and revenue management, dubbing them "masterminds", comparing their work to alchemy, and stating that others can learn from their manuscript. Alice Fulwood of The Economist praised Swift's and the company's ability to "pursue sharp business tactics, while at the same time being careful not to undermine Swift's wholesome image". Screen Daily's Jeremy Kay stated that Taylor Swift Productions "most likely has not needed to spend much if anything on marketing" to promote The Eras Tour, as a few posts from Swift was enough "to call her loyal fans to action". He also praised the film's "timely marketing strategy". In 2024, the business magazine Fast Company ranked Taylor Swift Productions at number 15 on their list of "The World's Most Innovative Companies", for "reimagining the business of concerts, music, and movies". The magazine cited the commercial success and innovative distribution agreement of The Eras Tour film as the chief reason.

== Credits ==
=== Films ===
Year	Title(s)	Director(s)	Distributor(s)	Budget	Worldwide gross	Ref.
2011	Speak Now World Tour – Live	Ryan Polito	Big Machine Records	—N/a	—N/a	
2018	Taylor Swift: The Road to Reputation	—N/a	Eleven; Network Ten	—N/a	—N/a	
2018	Taylor Swift: Reputation Stadium Tour	Paul Dugdale	Netflix (Note: As of December 30, 2023, it is no longer available for streaming.)	—N/a	—N/a	
2020	Taylor Swift: City of Lover	Dan Massie	ABC; Disney+; Hulu	—N/a	—N/a	
2020	Folklore: The Long Pond Studio Sessions	Taylor Swift	Disney+	—N/a	—N/a	
2021	All Too Well: The Short Film	Taylor Swift	PolyGram Entertainment; Republic Records; Universal Pictures	—N/a	—N/a	
2023	Taylor Swift: The Eras Tour	Sam Wrench	AMC Theatres; Variance Films; Trafalgar Releasing; Disney+	$15 million	$267.1 million	
2025	Taylor Swift: The Official Release Party of a Showgirl	Taylor Swift	AMC Theatres; Variance Films; Piece of Magic Entertainment	—N/a	$50.1 million	
2025	Taylor Swift: The Eras Tour: The Final Show	Glenn Weiss	Disney+	—N/a	—N/a	

=== Music videos ===
Year	Title	Artist(s)	Director(s)	Album	Ref.
2022	"Anti-Hero"	Swift	Swift	Midnights	
2022	"Bejeweled"	Swift	Swift	Midnights	
2023	"Lavender Haze"	Swift	Swift	Midnights	
2023	"Karma"	Swift; Ice Spice	Swift	Midnights	
2023	"I Can See You"	Swift	Swift	Speak Now (Taylor's Version)	
2024	"Fortnight"	Swift; Post Malone	Swift	The Tortured Poets Department	
2025	"The Fate of Ophelia"	Swift	Swift	The Life of a Showgirl	
2026	"Opalite"	Swift	Swift	The Life of a Showgirl	
2026	"Patient Zero"	Swift	Swift	The Life of a Showgirl	

== See also ==
- Olivia Benson, Swift's pet cat featured in the Taylor Swift Productions logo
