= Taylor Swift: The Official Release Party of a Showgirl =

2025 promotional film by Taylor Swift

- Theatrical release poster
- Directed by: Taylor Swift
- Written by: Taylor Swift
- Produced by: Taylor Swift; Jil Hardin
- Starring: Taylor Swift
- Cinematography: Rodrigo Prieto
- Music by: Taylor Swift; Max Martin; Shellback
- Production company: Taylor Swift Productions
- Distributed by: AMC Theatres
- Release date: October 3, 2025
- Running time: 89 minutes
- Box office: $50.1 million

Taylor Swift: The Official Release Party of a Showgirl (stylized as Taylor Swift | The Official Release Party of a Showgirl) is a 2025 promotional film by the American singer-songwriter Taylor Swift, accompanying her twelfth studio album, The Life of a Showgirl (2025). It contains the music video for "The Fate of Ophelia" and the lyric videos of other tracks from the album. The film was simultaneously released alongside the album on October 3, 2025, in limited theatrical screenings. It received mixed reviews from critics and topped the United States box office.

== Synopsis ==
The film features the music video for the album's lead single, "The Fate of Ophelia", which is played twice, and behind-the-scenes footage of the video's production, which plays in different segments. During these segments, Swift bakes a sourdough bread and reminds the team to record another take for the scene.

The film also features other tracks of the album in lyric videos, with Swift commenting on them. She calls the film her first cinematic release party, having conducted physical launch events for her previous albums. Each track features a backdrop of Swift's photo with a digitally enhanced kaleidoscope effect, though the opening title warns about the potential stroboscopic effect. Clean versions of songs were used to keep the event family-friendly. The title track is preceded by featured artist Sabrina Carpenter opening a show of Swift's The Eras Tour.

== Release ==
On September 19, 2025, Taylor Swift announced a film event, then titled The Official Release Party of a Showgirl, to tie into her twelfth studio album, The Life of a Showgirl (2025). Publications described it as an album release party, a special program, and a movie-musical event. Various publications also compared it to the "secret sessions" that Swift used to promote her earlier albums such as 1989 and Reputation, where fans were invited to her house for a listening party. (Note: Publications like Variety, Vanity Fair, Vogue, and Entertainment Weekly) In at interview with Ryan Seacrest, Swift mentioned wanting to infuse that element by sharing her creative experience theatrically.

The Official Release Party of a Showgirl had a limited theatrical release from October 3 to 5 in over 50 territories. It was originally scheduled to be released in at least 101 countries, though the release plan was later trimmed. Soon after the film's theatrical run, the music video and the album's lyric videos were released on YouTube.

Akin to her 2023 concert film Taylor Swift: The Eras Tour, Swift partnered with theatres for the film distribution, bypassing major studios. In North America, it played in all 540 AMC Theatres locations as well as Cinemark Theatres and Regal Cinemas. Variance Films and Piece of Magic Entertainment handled ticket bookings, the former for the United States and Canada, and the latter overseas.

== Reception ==
=== Box office ===
The Official Release Party of a Showgirl grossed $34.1 million in the United States and Canada, and $16 million in other territories, for a worldwide total of $50.1 million.

Deadline Hollywood reported on September 21 that The Official Release Party of a Showgirl made $15 million in pre-sales in its first 24 hours across all circuits. The film's first-day pre-sales outpaced that of The Eras Tour across Vue International's European markets and Cineworld's locations in Ireland and the United Kingdom. The Official Release Party of a Showgirl grossed $15.8 million on its opening day in the United States and Canada. It topped the domestic box office, besting fellow new release The Smashing Machine.

=== Critical response ===
On the review aggregator website Rotten Tomatoes, 64% of 11 critics' reviews are positive, with an average rating of 4.5/10. Metacritic, which uses a weighted average, assigned the film a score of 47 out of 100, based on four critics, indicating "mixed or average" reviews. Audiences polled by CinemaScore gave The Official Release Party of a Showgirl an average grade of "A+" on an A+ to F scale, while those polled by PostTrak gave it a 93% overall positive score, with 82% saying they would definitely recommend the film.

Adrian Horton of The Guardian rated The Official Release Party of a Showgirl two out of five stars, calling it a "lazy big screen cash-in" with a rushed quality, while Blanca Schofield of The Times wrote that the film "could be seen as a cynical capitalist move by the best businesswoman in the game". Variety's Owen Gleiberman opined that The Official Release Party of a Showgirl could "become a prototype for how Swift releases albums in the future" because of the reportedly high ticket sales, but added that it also "highlights aspects of the album that may not wear so well over time". Angie Han of The Hollywood Reporter found the film overall underwhelming while praising the music video for "The Fate of Ophelia".

A positive review came from Fred Topel of the United Press International, who highlighted that "Swift knows how to make it an event even without a stage performance and focusing on only one album." Steve Seigh of JoBlo.com awarded The Official Release Party of a Showgirl a score of eight out of ten, calling it "an eye-opening look at the heart and inner workings of one of entertainment's most gifted, kind, and cherished sensations." Following the film's release, Vanity Fair's Samantha Bergeson concluded that Swift reframed her own legacy, personally and professionally, proving "that the songwriter is deftly able to walk the tight rope of fame." Dessi Gomez of Deadline Hollywood highlighted how The Official Release Party of a Showgirl provided a study of Swift's work ethic, adding that it "showcases just how much thought she puts into her work." Liz Shannon Miller of Consequence described the film's release party as "basically church", concluding that it ended up being "an appropriately reverent experience."
