= Olivia Benson (cat) =

Taylor Swift's cat

- Other name: Dibbles
- Species: Domestic cat
- Breed: Scottish Fold
- Sex: Female
- Born: January 23, 2014 (age 12)
- Owner: Taylor Swift
- Named after: Olivia Benson

Olivia Benson is a Scottish Fold cat owned by the American singer-songwriter Taylor Swift. She was adopted in June 2014 and named after the Law & Order character. Olivia has since appeared in Swift's music videos for "Blank Space" (2014), "Me!" (2019), and "Karma" (2023), and the documentary film Miss Americana (2020).

Olivia has starred in the brand commercials of Keds, Diet Coke, AT&T, and DirecTV, and is the logo of Taylor Swift Productions, Swift's in-house visual media studio. Often appearing in Swift's Instagram posts, Olivia contributed to an increased popularity of Scottish Folds among the public. The cat has been referenced in films like Deadpool 2 (2018) and Argylle (2024), as well as a Law & Order sketch at the 78th Primetime Emmy Awards (2026).

== Early life ==
Olivia Benson was purchased by Swift in June 2014 as a kitten. She has osteochondrodysplasia, a degenerative joint disease, which affects all Scottish Fold cats. Olivia, like Swift's two other cats, is named after a fictional character, taking after Olivia Benson, the main protagonist of American crime drama series Law & Order: Special Victims Unit played by Mariska Hargitay. Swift's eldest cat, Meredith Grey, is another Scottish Fold, named after the Grey's Anatomy character, and the youngest cat is Benjamin Button, a Ragdoll named after the titular character of The Curious Case of Benjamin Button. Meredith and Olivia's names, Swift told Rolling Stone in September 2014, were themed after "strong, complex, independent women". In September 2014, Swift was pictured carrying Olivia around the streets of New York City; Swift noted that this was due to Olivia's inability to cope with being in a cat carrier.

== Career ==
In October 2014, Keds released an advertising campaign featuring Olivia for their "Sneaky Cat" shoes, which featured Swift's birthday on the back, to promote Swift's album 1989. Later that month, Olivia featured in a Diet Coke commercial in which Swift drank Diet Coke as more and more kittens appeared with every sip.

In November 2014, Olivia appeared in a Swift music video ("Blank Space") for the first time. In 2015, Olivia met American actress Mariska Hargitay, who played the Olivia Benson character in Law & Order. In 2017, Ed Sheeran bought his own Scottish Fold, Calippo, to match Swift's cats. Increased interest in the breed as a result of Swift and Sheeran posting them to their Instagram accounts prompted the British Veterinary Association to call for a ban on the breed and for Veterinary Record to review its use in adverts. Later that year, Olivia appeared in an outtake of an AT&T commercial, and the following year she appeared in a DirecTV commercial in which Swift rode a giant "caticorn" version of Olivia. (Note: Half cat, half unicorn.)

In April 2019, Olivia and Meredith appeared in Swift's "Me!" music video, along with Benjamin, who Swift subsequently adopted. The cats also appeared in Miss Americana, Swift's 2020 autobiographical documentary film. In May 2023, a sleeping Olivia featured in the music video for Swift's "Karma".

=== In popular culture ===
- In 2014, Swift appeared on The Graham Norton Show with English comedian John Cleese and cricketer Kevin Pietersen; Cleese called Olivia as "the weirdest cat I've ever seen in my life", prompting a scolding from Norton.
- In 2015, Swift shared a video online which showed Olivia interacting for the first time with the American actress Mariska Hargitay, who plays the Law & Order character. In 2026, Olivia appeared alongside Hargitay in a Law & Order comedic sketch at the 78th Primetime Emmy Awards, starring Swift as a rookie cop.
- Olivia is the logo of Swift's in-house visual production company, Taylor Swift Productions.
- In a scene in the 2018 superhero film Deadpool 2, the lead character Wade Wilson is seen wearing a t-shirt bearing images of Olivia and Meredith.
- Olivia influenced some aspects of the spy film Argylle (2024), directed by Matthew Vaughn; one of the film's official posters was inspired by a shot of Olivia in a cat carrier from Miss Americana.

== Awards and nominations ==
Award	Year (Note: Indicates the year of ceremony. Each year is linked to the article about the awards held that year, wherever possible.)	Recipient(s)	Category	Result	Ref.
Nickelodeon Australian Kids' Choice Awards	2015	Meredith Grey and Olivia Benson	Aussie/Kiwi's Favourite Animal	Nominated	
Nickelodeon UK Kids' Choice Awards	2016	Olivia Benson	UK Favourite Famous Cat	Nominated	
iHeartRadio Music Awards	2018	Olivia Benson	Cutest Musician's Pet	Nominated	
MTV Millennial Awards Brazil	2018	Olivia Benson	Pet of the Year	Nominated	
MTV Millennial Awards Brazil	2019	Olivia Benson	Pet of the Year	Nominated	
Nickelodeon Kids' Choice Awards	2023	Olivia Benson	Favorite Celebrity Pet	Won	

== See also ==
- Cultural depictions of cats
- List of individual cats
- List of Law & Order characters
