= List of number-one songs of 2024 (Panama) =

This is a list of the number-one songs of 2024 in Panama. The charts are published by Monitor Latino, based on airplay across radio stations in Panama using the Radio Tracking Data, LLC in real time, with its chart week running from Monday to Sunday.

In 2024 so far, twelve songs reached number one in Panama, with four of them being collaborations; a thirteenth single (which was also a collaboration), "La Original" by Emilia and Tini, began its run at number one in December 2023. In fact, thirteen acts topped the chart as either lead or featured artists with five—Benny Blanco, Aldo Ranks, Los Rabanes, Doble Sentido and Elena Rose—achieving their first number-one single in Panama.

Myke Towers is the only act to have more than a number-one song in 2024, with two.

== Chart history ==
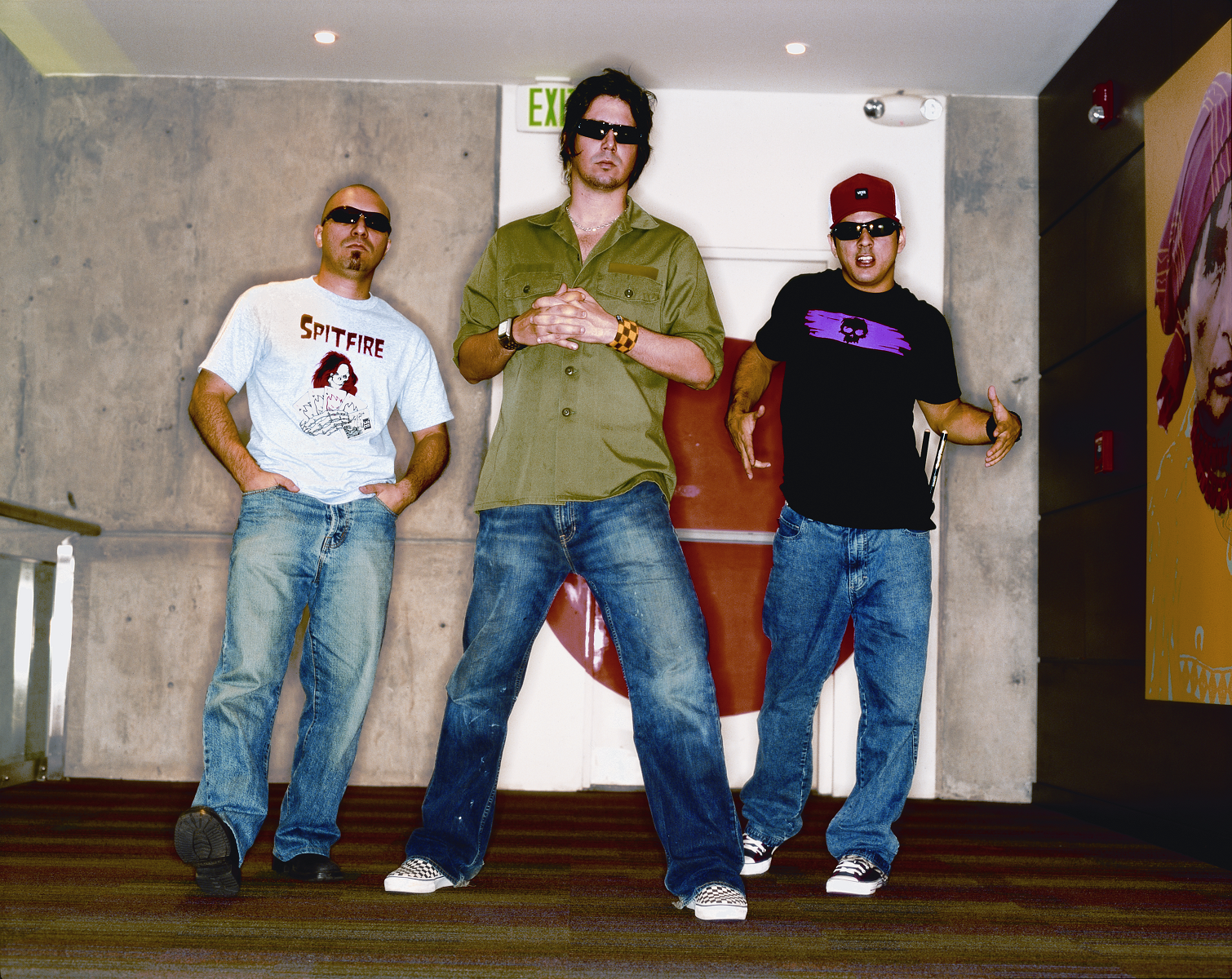
Panamanian rock band Los Rabanes earned their first number-one song with "Los hombres también lloran".

Key
†	Indicates best-performing single of 2024

Issue date	Song	Artist	Reference
1 January	"La Original"	Emilia and Tini	
8 January	"La Original"	Emilia and Tini	
15 January	"La Original"	Emilia and Tini	
22 January	"La Falda"	Myke Towers	
29 January	"La Falda"	Myke Towers	
5 February	"Le Metí"	Aldo Ranks	
12 February	"Le Metí"	Aldo Ranks	
19 February	"Sobre Todo"	Farah	
26 February	"Sobre Todo"	Farah	
4 March	"Sobre Todo"	Farah	
11 March	"Los hombres también lloran"	Los Rabanes	
18 March	"Los hombres también lloran"	Los Rabanes	
25 March	"Los hombres también lloran"	Los Rabanes	
1 April	"Los hombres también lloran"	Los Rabanes	
8 April	"Los hombres también lloran"	Los Rabanes	
15 April	"Los hombres también lloran"	Los Rabanes	
22 April	"Los hombres también lloran"	Los Rabanes	
29 April	"Yo No Estoy Pa' Eso"	Doble Sentido	
6 May	"Yo No Estoy Pa' Eso"	Doble Sentido	
13 May	"Yo No Estoy Pa' Eso"	Doble Sentido	
20 May	"Yo No Estoy Pa' Eso"	Doble Sentido	
27 May	"Tu o Yo"	Silvestre Dangond and Carlos Vives	
3 June	"Tu o Yo"	Silvestre Dangond and Carlos Vives	
10 June	"Tu o Yo"	Silvestre Dangond and Carlos Vives	
17 June	"Tu o Yo"	Silvestre Dangond and Carlos Vives	
24 June	"Orion" †	Boza and Elena Rose	
1 July	"Orion" †	Boza and Elena Rose	
8 July	"Orion" †	Boza and Elena Rose	
15 July	"Orion" †	Boza and Elena Rose	
22 July	"Polvo de tu vida"	J Balvin and Chencho Corleone	
29 July	"Polvo de tu vida"	J Balvin and Chencho Corleone	
5 August	"Polvo de tu vida"	J Balvin and Chencho Corleone	
12 August	"Si Antes Te Hubiera Conocido"	Karol G	
19 August	"Si Antes Te Hubiera Conocido"	Karol G	
26 August	"Si Antes Te Hubiera Conocido"	Karol G	
2 September	"Si Antes Te Hubiera Conocido"	Karol G	
9 September	"Si Antes Te Hubiera Conocido"	Karol G	
16 September	"Si Antes Te Hubiera Conocido"	Karol G	
23 September	"Si Antes Te Hubiera Conocido"	Karol G	
30 September	"Superas"	Farah	
7 October	"Soltera"	Shakira	
14 October	"Soltera"	Shakira	
21 October	"Soltera"	Shakira	
28 October	"Soltera"	Shakira	
4 November	"Soltera"	Shakira	
11 November	"Soltera"	Shakira	
18 November	"Soltera"	Shakira	
25 November	"Degenere"	Myke Towers and Benny Blanco	
2 December	"Degenere"	Myke Towers and Benny Blanco	
9 December	"Degenere"	Myke Towers and Benny Blanco	
16 December	"Degenere"	Myke Towers and Benny Blanco	
23 December	"Soltera"	Shakira	
30 December	"Soltera"	Shakira	
