= List of Billboard Tropical Airplay number ones of 2024 =

The Billboard Tropical Airplay chart is a subchart of the Latin Airplay that ranks the best-performing tropical songs played on Latin radio stations in the United States.

== Chart history ==
Issue date	Song	Artist	Ref.
January 6	"Asi Es La Vida"	Enrique Iglesias and Maria Becerra	
January 13	"Asi Es La Vida"	Enrique Iglesias and Maria Becerra	
January 20	"Asi Es La Vida"	Enrique Iglesias and Maria Becerra	
January 27	"Asi Es La Vida"	Enrique Iglesias and Maria Becerra	
February 3	"Punta Cana"	Marc Anthony	
February 10	"Punta Cana"	Marc Anthony	
February 17	"Punta Cana"	Marc Anthony	
February 24	"Cosas de la Peda"	Prince Royce and Gabito Ballesteros	
March 2	"Cosas de la Peda"	Prince Royce and Gabito Ballesteros	
March 9	"Cosas de la Peda"	Prince Royce and Gabito Ballesteros	
March 16	"Cosas de la Peda"	Prince Royce and Gabito Ballesteros	
March 23	"Cosas de la Peda"	Prince Royce and Gabito Ballesteros	
March 30	"Cosas de la Peda"	Prince Royce and Gabito Ballesteros	
April 6	"Cosas de la Peda"	Prince Royce and Gabito Ballesteros	
April 13	"Cosas de la Peda"	Prince Royce and Gabito Ballesteros	
April 20	"Cosas de la Peda"	Prince Royce and Gabito Ballesteros	
April 27	"Cosas de la Peda"	Prince Royce and Gabito Ballesteros	
May 4	"Cosas de la Peda"	Prince Royce and Gabito Ballesteros	
May 11	"Cosas de la Peda"	Prince Royce and Gabito Ballesteros	
May 18	"La Capi"	Myke Towers	
May 25	"La Capi"	Myke Towers	
June 1	"La Capi"	Myke Towers	
June 8	"La Capi"	Myke Towers	
June 15	"La Capi"	Myke Towers	
June 22	"La Capi"	Myke Towers	
June 29	"La Capi"	Myke Towers	
July 6	"La Capi"	Myke Towers	
July 13	"Ale Ale"	Marc Anthony	
July 20	"Si Antes Te Hubiera Conocido"	Karol G	
July 27	"Si Antes Te Hubiera Conocido"	Karol G	
August 3	"Si Antes Te Hubiera Conocido"	Karol G	
August 10	"Si Antes Te Hubiera Conocido"	Karol G	
August 17	"Si Antes Te Hubiera Conocido"	Karol G	
August 24	"Si Antes Te Hubiera Conocido"	Karol G	
August 31	"Si Antes Te Hubiera Conocido"	Karol G	
September 7	"Si Antes Te Hubiera Conocido"	Karol G	
September 14	"Si Antes Te Hubiera Conocido"	Karol G	
September 21	"Si Antes Te Hubiera Conocido"	Karol G	
September 28	"Si Antes Te Hubiera Conocido"	Karol G	
October 5	"Si Antes Te Hubiera Conocido"	Karol G	
October 12	"Si Antes Te Hubiera Conocido"	Karol G	
October 19	"Si Antes Te Hubiera Conocido"	Karol G	
October 26	"Si Antes Te Hubiera Conocido"	Karol G	
November 2	"Si Antes Te Hubiera Conocido"	Karol G	
November 9	"Si Antes Te Hubiera Conocido"	Karol G	
November 16	"Si Antes Te Hubiera Conocido"	Karol G	
November 23	"Si Antes Te Hubiera Conocido"	Karol G	
November 30	"Si Antes Te Hubiera Conocido"	Karol G	
December 7	"Si Antes Te Hubiera Conocido"	Karol G	
December 14	"Si Antes Te Hubiera Conocido"	Karol G	
December 21	"Si Antes Te Hubiera Conocido"	Karol G	
December 28	"Si Antes Te Hubiera Conocido"	Karol G	
