= Baile Inolvidable =

Single by Bad Bunny

from the album Debí Tirar Más Fotos
- Language: Spanish
- English title: "Unforgettable Dance"
- Released: January 9, 2025
- Genre: Salsa
- Length: 6:08
- Label: Rimas
- Songwriters: Benito Martínez; Marco Borrero
- Producers: MAG; Big Jay; Julito; Elikai; La Paciencia

Bad Bunny singles chronology
"Pitorro de Coco" (2024)	"Baile Inolvidable" (2025)	"DTMF" (2025)

Music video
- "Baile Inolvidable" on YouTube

"Baile Inolvidable" (stylized as "BAILE INoLVIDABLE"; transl. "Unforgettable Dance") is a song by Puerto Rican rapper Bad Bunny. It was released on January 9, 2025, through Rimas Entertainment, as the third single from his sixth solo studio album Debí Tirar Más Fotos (2025).

== Background and release ==
On January 3, 2025, when Bad Bunny revealed the track listing names for his album Debí Tirar Más Fotos, it was where "Baile Inolvidable" was also revealed to be included as the third track.

== Music and lyrics ==
Musically, "Baile Inolvidable" is a salsa song as a tribute to Puerto Rican cultural heritage. Bad Bunny described the song in an interview with Zane Lowe for Apple Music 1:

"It’s a song I’d had in mind for perhaps two years.The whole composition, the whole song, was already in my head long before it was created. I made it with young, talented musicians from Puerto Rico. They’re all 20, 21 or 22 years old, they’re very young and they come from the Escuela Libre de Música, a public music school in Puerto Rico"

== Visualizer ==
An audio visualizer was released alongside the other songs upon the album's release on January 5, 2025. The visualizer for "Baile Inolvidable" recounts the creation of the Free Associated State and cultural nationalism (1952).

== Music video ==
A music video was released on January 9, 2025. The music video was directed by Kacho Lopez Mari. Most of them show Bad Bunny and several people dancing salsa on a stage, and in a few moments Bad Bunny also appears singing into a microphone. It also features the participation of Jacobo Morales.

== Live performances ==
Bad Bunny performed the song as part of his Super Bowl halftime show.

== Charts ==
=== Weekly charts ===
Weekly chart performance for "Baile Inolvidable"
Chart (2025–2026)	Peak position
Argentina Hot 100 (Billboard)	2
Argentina (CAPIF)	3
Australia (ARIA)	34
Austria (Ö3 Austria Top 40)	10
Belgium (Ultratop 50 Wallonia)	38
Bolivia (Billboard)	1
Brazil Hot 100 (Billboard)	25
Canada Hot 100 (Billboard)	7
Central America (Monitor Latino)	11
Central America + Caribbean (FONOTICA)	12
Chile (Billboard)	1
Colombia (Billboard)	2
Costa Rica Airplay (Monitor Latino)	12
Costa Rica Streaming (FONOTICA)	1
Czech Republic Singles Digital (ČNS IFPI)	57
Denmark (Tracklisten)	25
Dominican Republic Airplay (Monitor Latino)	1
Ecuador (Billboard)	1
El Salvador (ASAP EGC)	1
Finland (Suomen virallinen lista)	49
France (SNEP)	13
Germany (GfK)	12
Global 200 (Billboard)	2
Greece International (IFPI)	3
Guatemala Airplay (Monitor Latino)	16
Honduras Airplay (Monitor Latino)	11
Hungary (Single Top 40)	36
Iceland (Billboard)	5
Ireland (IRMA)	14
Israel (Mako Hitlist)	43
Italy (FIMI)	4
Latvia Streaming (LaIPA)	16
Lithuania (AGATA)	3
Luxembourg (Billboard)	3
Mexico (Billboard)	2
Netherlands (Single Top 100)	21
New Zealand (Recorded Music NZ)	37
Nicaragua Airplay (Monitor Latino)	13
Norway (IFPI Norge)	38
Panama Airplay (Monitor Latino)	8
Panama International (PRODUCE)	11
Peru (Billboard)	1
Poland (Polish Streaming Top 100)	39
Portugal (AFP)	1
Puerto Rico (Monitor Latino)	1
Romania (Billboard)	9
Slovakia Singles Digital (ČNS IFPI)	19
Spain (PROMUSICAE)	1
Suriname (Nationale Top 40)	5
Sweden (Sverigetopplistan)	26
Switzerland (Schweizer Hitparade)	3
UK Singles (Official Charts)	20
UK Independent (Official Charts)	6
US Billboard Hot 100	2
US Hot Latin Songs (Billboard)	1
US Hot Tropical Songs (Billboard)	1
US Latin Airplay (Billboard)	1
US Tropical Airplay (Billboard)	1
Venezuela Airplay (Record Report)	1

=== Monthly charts ===
Monthly chart performance for "Baile Inolvidable"
Chart (2026)	Peak position
Brazil Streaming (Pro-Música Brasil)	49
Uruguay (CUD)	3

=== Year-end charts ===
Year-end chart performance for "Baile Inolvidable"
Chart (2025)	Position
Argentina Airplay (Monitor Latino)	49
Bolivia Airplay (Monitor Latino)	6
Central America Airplay (Monitor Latino)	10
Chile Airplay (Monitor Latino)	58
El Salvador Airplay (ASAP EGC)	2
France (SNEP)	175
Global 200 (Billboard)	22
Italy (FIMI)	74
Switzerland (Schweizer Hitparade)	36
US Billboard Hot 100	70
US Hot Latin Songs (Billboard)	2

== Certifications ==
Certifications and sales for "Baile Inolvidable"
Region	Certification	Certified units/sales
Belgium (BRMA)	Gold	20,000^{‡}
Brazil (Pro-Música Brasil)	2× Diamond	320,000^{‡}
France (SNEP)	Diamond	333,333^{‡}
Italy (FIMI)	Platinum	200,000^{‡}
Portugal (AFP)	6× Platinum	150,000^{‡}
Spain (Promusicae)	7× Platinum	700,000^{‡}
United Kingdom (BPI)	Silver	200,000^{‡}
Streaming
Greece (IFPI Greece)	Platinum	2,000,000^{†}
^{‡} Sales+streaming figures based on certification alone.^{†} Streaming-only figures based on certification alone.

== See also ==
- List of Billboard Hot Latin Songs and Latin Airplay number ones of 2025
- List of Billboard number-one tropical songs of 2025
