= Si Antes Te Hubiera Conocido =

2024 single by Karol G

Single by Karol G

from the album Tropicoqueta
- Language: Spanish
- English title: "If I Had Met You Before"
- Released: June 20, 2024
- Genre: Merengue
- Length: 3:16
- Label: Bichota; Interscope
- Songwriters: Carolina Giraldo; Édgar Barrera; Alejandro Ramírez; Andrés Correa
- Producers: Édgar Barrera; Sky Rompiendo; Karol G

Karol G singles chronology
"Contigo" (2024)	"Si Antes Te Hubiera Conocido" (2024)	"Vivo Por Ella" (2024)

Music video
- "Si Antes Te Hubiera Conocido" on YouTube

"Si Antes Te Hubiera Conocido" (Latin American Spanish: [si ˈantes te uˈβjeɾa konoˈsiðo, sj ˈantes te wˈβjeɾa -]; transl. "If I Had Met You Before") is a song by Colombian singer-songwriter Karol G. It was written alongside Rios, Édgar Barrera and Sky Rompiendo, and produced by the latter two alongside Giraldo. It was released on June 20, 2024, through Bichota Records and Interscope, as the lead single from her fifth studio album, Tropicoqueta (2025).

== Background ==
On June 18, 2024, Karol G announced the release of "Si Antes Te Hubiera Conocido", with a sample of the song shared through her social media accounts. It was released on June 20, 2024.

== Composition ==
Billboard called it a venture for the artist into the Merengue genre. She expressed her love for the culture of Dominican Republic and their music in an Instagram post that was posted in June 2024.

"Part of Mañana Será Bonito was worked over there. Their culture, their music, their colors, the hospitality, the energy… everything feels so authentic and special there. Their people have embraced me in a way that fills my heart and inspires me all the time.”

— Karol G in a statement made on her Instagram post in June 2024.

== Commercial performance ==
=== North America ===
In the United States, "Si Antes Te Hubiera Conocido" debuted at 34 the Billboard Hot 100 with 11.9 million official US streams along with 2,000 downloads and 4.1 million audience impressions. It would peak at 32, and become her ninth number 1 hit on the Hot Latin Songs chart. In other Latin song charts, it peaked atop Latin Digital Song Sales, Latin Streaming Songs, and Latin Airplay.

In Canada's Canadian Hot 100, the song debuted at its peak of 82, becoming her first solo entry on the chart and joining FloyyMenor & Cris Mj’s "Gata Only" as the only Latin songs to appear on the chart in 2024. In Mexico, the song debuted at number 7, becoming her fifth top ten hit on the chart since its creation. It later peaked at number 2 on the issue dated July 6, 2024, maintaining the position for seven weeks.

In other countries in North America, "Si Antes Te Hubiera Conocido" charted in Costa Rica (1), Dominican Republic (1), El Salvador (1), Guatemala (1), Honduras (1), Nicaragua (1), Panama (1), and Puerto Rico (1).

=== Europe ===
In Europe, "Si Antes Te Hubiera Conocido" debuted at number 2 in Spain and reached the top spot the following week, becoming her 6th chart topper in the country and her first as a solo artist. It would spend sixteen weeks atop the summit, the most for a solo song by a Female artist, and receive a 10× platinum certification for selling 600,000 units in the country. In Italy, the song peaked at number 4. It became her first solo entry in the country, and joined Gata Only as the only Latin songs to reach Italy's top 10 in 2024. It additionally received a double-platinum certification in the country for 200,000 units. The song received a sextuple-platinum certification in Portugal (60,000), alongside a diamond certification in France (333,333).

In other countries in Europe, "Si Antes Te Hubiera Conocido" charted in Belgium (2), Croatia (11), France (16), Luxembourg (5), Netherlands (7), Poland (8), Portugal (1), Romania (3), San Marino (2), Slovenia (18), and Switzerland (7).

=== South America ===
In South America, "Si Antes Te Hubiera Conocido" was an instant success, becoming a chart-topper across the continent. The song debuted at number 1 in Karol's home country of Colombia, scoring her eighth number 1 and eighteenth top 10. In Argentina, the song debuted at the 22nd position. It maintained stability in the top 10 until finally reaching the top spot in its twelfth week, sitting atop the chart for fifteen weeks. In Chile, the song rose atop the chart in its fourth week, becoming her longest chart-topper, with seven weeks at the top. "Si Antes Te Hubiera Conocido" swept charts in Ecuador, Peru, and Bolivia; reaching number 1 for seventeen weeks, nineteen weeks, and thirteen weeks respectively. In total, the track spent seventy weeks at number 1 on South American billboard charts alone.

In other countries in South America, "Si Antes Te Hubiera Conocido" charted in Paraguay (1), Suriname (3), Uruguay (1), and Venezuela (1). It additionally peaked atop unified charts for Latin America and Central America.

=== Global ===
On the Billboard Global 200, "Si Antes Te Hubiera Conocido" debuted at number 15 on the issue dated July 6, 2024. Six weeks later, it would reach the top 10 and eventually peak at number 5 with 75.4 million on demand streams worldwide.

On official charts, the song peaked at number 1 in over twenty countries including Argentina, Colombia, Spain, and Portugal. It reached the top 10 in over 30 countries, such as Mexico, Italy, Netherlands, Belgium, and more.

== Awards and nominations ==
Awards and nominations for "Si Antes Te Hubiera Conocido"
Year	Ceremony	Category	Result	Ref.
2024	Billboard Latin Music Awards	Sales Song of the Year	Nominated	
2024	Break Tudo Awards	Latin Hit of the Year	Nominated	
2024	InMusic Awards	Best Latin Song	Nominated	
2024	Los 40 Music Awards	Best Latin Video	Nominated	
2024	Los 40 Music Awards	Best Latin Song	Nominated	
2024	Musa Sprite Awards	Best International Latin Song	Won	
2024	WME Awards	Latin American Song	Nominated	
2025	American Music Awards	Favorite Music Video	Nominated	
2025	American Music Awards	Favorite Latin Song	Nominated	
2025	Billboard Latin Music Awards	Global 200 Latin Song of the Year	Won	
2025	Billboard Latin Music Awards	Sales Song of the Year	Won	
2025	Billboard Latin Music Awards	Streaming Song of the Year	Nominated	
2025	Billboard Latin Music Awards	Airplay Song of the Year	Won	
2025	Billboard Latin Music Awards	Tropical Song of the Year	Won	
2025	Guinness World Records	Most weeks at No.1 on Billboard’s Latin Airplay chart (one song)	Won	
2025	Heat Latin Music Awards	Song of the Year	Won	
2025	Heat Latin Music Awards	Best Video	Won	
2025	iHeartRadio Music Awards	Latin Pop/Urban Song of the Year	Nominated	
2025	Latin Grammy Awards	Record of the Year	Nominated	
2025	Latin Grammy Awards	Song of the Year	Won	
2025	Latin Grammy Awards	Best Tropical Song	Won	
2025	Latino Music Awards	Song of the Year	Nominated	
2025	Latino Music Awards	Best Tropical Song	Won	
2025	Latino Music Awards	Video of the Year	Nominated	
2025	Monitor Latino Music Awards	Best Urban Song of the Year	Nominated	
2025	Monitor Latino Music Awards	Best Tropical Song	Won	
2025	Premios Juventud	Tropical Hit	Won	
2025	Premio Lo Nuestro	Song of the Year	Won	
2025	Premio Lo Nuestro	Tropical Song of the Year	Nominated	
2025	Premios Nuestra Tierra	Best Global Song	Won	
2025	Premios Nuestra Tierra	Best Tropical Song	Won	
2025	Premios Nuestra Tierra	Best Viral Song	Nominated	
2025	Premios Odeón	Best Latin Song	Won	
2025	Spotify Plaques	One Billion Streams Award	Won	
2025	WME Awards	Latin American Song	Nominated	
2026	BMI Latin Awards	Contemporary Latin Song of the Year	Won	
2026	BMI Latin Awards	Award Winning Song	Won	

== Music video ==
The music video for "Si Antes Te Hubiera Conocido" was directed by Pedro Artola and was released on Karol G's YouTube channel on June 20, 2024. The video is an ode to summer and was recorded in the Dominican Republic. The video is set at a party in front of the sea and captures the festive spirit of a karaoke in a place that ends up becoming a gigantic dance party with people enjoying life and dancing on a street.

== Live performances ==
Karol G performed "Si Antes Te Hubiera Conocido" live for the first time on the arena-stadium Mañana Será Bonito Tour in London, on June 19, 2024, where the song was incorporated on the set list for the rest of the tour. On September 11, 2024, Giraldo performed the song at the 2024 MTV Video Music Awards. The song was present during Karol G's set list for her Rock in Rio show on September 20, 2024. Giraldo performed the song on December 8, 2024, as a guest on the Ferxxocalipsis World Tour. The song was performed during the Debí Tirar Más Fotos World Tour on January 25, 2026, where she was once again invited as a guest. On September 5, 2025, Karol G headlined the half time show for the season opener for the NFL in São Paulo, where a shortened version of the song was performed. "Si Antes Te Hubiera Conocido" was performed at the 2026 Coachella Valley Music and Arts Festival on April 12 and 19. From July 24, 2026, through June 24, 2027, Karol G is set to embark on the stadium Viajando Por El Mundo Tropitour, where the song is present throughout the set list.

== Charts ==
=== Weekly charts ===
Weekly chart performance for "Si Antes Te Hubiera Conocido"
Chart (2024–2025)	Peak position
Argentina Hot 100 (Billboard)	1
Argentina (CAPIF)	1
Argentina (Monitor Latino)	1
Belgium (Ultratop 50 Flanders)	6
Belgium (Ultratop 50 Wallonia)	2
Bolivia (Billboard)	1
Bolivia (Monitor Latino)	1
Brazil (Crowley Charts)	2
Canada Hot 100 (Billboard)	82
Central America (Monitor Latino)	1
Central America + Caribbean (FONOTICA)	1
Chile (Billboard)	1
Chile (Monitor Latino)	1
CIS Airplay (TopHit)	77
Colombia (National-Report)	1
Colombia (Billboard)	1
Colombia (Monitor Latino)	1
Costa Rica (FONOTICA)	1
Costa Rica (Monitor Latino)	1
Croatia International Airplay (Top lista)	11
Dominican Republic (Monitor Latino)	1
Ecuador (Billboard)	1
Ecuador (Monitor Latino)	1
El Salvador (ASAP EGC)	1
El Salvador (Monitor Latino)	1
France (SNEP)	16
France Airplay (SNEP)	1
Global 200 (Billboard)	5
Guatemala (Monitor Latino)	1
Honduras (Monitor Latino)	1
Italy (FIMI)	4
Italy Airplay (EarOne)	1
Latin America (Monitor Latino)	1
Lithuania Airplay (TopHit)	44
Luxembourg (Billboard)	5
Mexico (Billboard)	2
Mexico (Monitor Latino)	1
Netherlands (Dutch Top 40)	7
Netherlands (Single Top 100)	10
Nicaragua (Monitor Latino)	1
Panama International (PRODUCE)	1
Panama Airplay (Monitor Latino)	1
Paraguay (Monitor Latino)	1
Peru (Billboard)	1
Peru (Monitor Latino)	1
Poland (Polish Airplay Top 100)	8
Poland (Polish Streaming Top 100)	100
Portugal (AFP)	1
Puerto Rico (Monitor Latino)	1
Romania (RRA)	2
San Marino Airplay (SMRTV Top 50)	2
Slovenia Airplay (Radiomonitor)	18
Spain (PROMUSICAE)	1
Suriname (Nationale Top 40)	3
Switzerland (Schweizer Hitparade)	7
Uruguay (Monitor Latino)	1
US Billboard Hot 100	32
US Hot Latin Songs (Billboard)	1
US Latin Airplay (Billboard)	1
US Regional Mexican Airplay (Billboard)	11
US Tropical Airplay (Billboard)	1
Venezuela (Monitor Latino)	4
Venezuela (Record Report)	1

=== Monthly charts ===
Monthly chart performance for "Si Antes Te Hubiera Conocido"
Chart (2024)	Peak position
CIS Airplay (TopHit)	79
Lithuania Airplay (TopHit)	62
Panama Streaming (PRODUCE)	2
Paraguay Airplay (SGP)	2
Romania Airplay (TopHit)	33
Uruguay Streaming (CUD)	1

=== Year-end charts ===
2024 year-end chart performance for "Si Antes Te Hubiera Conocido"
Chart (2024)	Position
Belgium (Ultratop 50 Flanders)	54
Belgium (Ultratop 50 Wallonia)	34
Bolivia Airplay (Monitor Latino)	2
Central America Airplay (Monitor Latino)	3
Chile Airplay (Monitor Latino)	1
Colombia (Monitor Latino)	1
Costa Rica Airplay (Monitor Latino)	17
Dominican Republic Airplay (Monitor Latino)	6
Ecuador Airplay (Monitor Latino)	2
El Salvador Airplay (Monitor Latino)	4
France (SNEP)	74
Global 200 (Billboard)	66
Guatemala Airplay (Monitor Latino)	6
Honduras Airplay (Monitor Latino)	7
Italy (FIMI)	30
Latin America Airplay (Monitor Latino)	2
Mexico Airplay (Monitor Latino)	21
Netherlands (Dutch Top 40)	37
Netherlands (Single Top 100)	64
Nicaragua Airplay (Monitor Latino)	24
Panama Airplay (Monitor Latino)	3
Paraguay Airplay (Monitor Latino)	25
Peru Airplay (Monitor Latino)	1
Poland (Polish Airplay Top 100)	75
Portugal (AFP)	16
Puerto Rico Airplay (Monitor Latino)	23
Spain (PROMUSICAE)	1
Switzerland (Schweizer Hitparade)	42
Uruguay Airplay (Monitor Latino)	7
US Hot Latin Songs (Billboard)	8
US Latin Airplay (Billboard)	5
US Tropical Airplay (Billboard)	1

2025 year-end chart performance for "Si Antes Te Hubiera Conocido"
Chart (2025)	Position
Argentina Airplay (Monitor Latino)	1
Belgium (Ultratop 50 Flanders)	95
Belgium (Ultratop 50 Wallonia)	31
Bolivia Airplay (Monitor Latino)	16
Central America Airplay (Monitor Latino)	3
Chile Airplay (Monitor Latino)	3
El Salvador Airplay (ASAP EGC)	9
France (SNEP)	48
Global 200 (Billboard)	19
Italy (FIMI)	41
Netherlands (Single Top 100)	64
Poland (Polish Airplay Top 100)	82
Spain (PROMUSICAE)	8
Switzerland (Schweizer Hitparade)	29
US Hot Latin Songs (Billboard)	25

== Certifications ==
Certifications for "Si Antes Te Hubiera Conocido"
Region	Certification	Certified units/sales
Belgium (BRMA)	Platinum	40,000^{‡}
Brazil (Pro-Música Brasil)	Diamond	160,000^{‡}
Canada (Music Canada)	2× Platinum	160,000^{‡}
France (SNEP)	Diamond	333,333^{‡}
Italy (FIMI)	2× Platinum	200,000^{‡}
Poland (ZPAV)	Gold	25,000^{‡}
Portugal (AFP)	6× Platinum	150,000^{‡}
Spain (Promusicae)	10× Platinum	600,000^{‡}
^{‡} Sales+streaming figures based on certification alone.

== See also ==
- List of Billboard Argentina Hot 100 number-one singles of 2024
- List of Billboard Argentina Hot 100 top-ten singles in 2024
- List of Billboard Global 200 top-ten singles in 2024
- List of Billboard Hot Latin Songs and Latin Airplay number ones of 2024
- List of Billboard Hot Latin Songs and Latin Airplay number ones of 2025
- List of Billboard Tropical Airplay number ones of 2024
- List of Billboard number-one tropical songs of 2025
- List of number-one singles of 2024 (Portugal)
- List of number-one songs of 2024 (Panama)
- List of number-one singles of 2024 (Spain)
- List of best-selling singles in Spain
