= List of Billboard number-one tropical songs of 2025 =

The Billboard Hot Tropical Songs and Tropical Airplay chart ranks the best-performing tropical songs played on Latin radio stations in the United States.

== Chart history ==
Chart history
Issue date	Hot Tropical Songs			Tropical Airplay		
Issue date	Title	Artist(s)	Ref.	Title	Artist(s)	Ref.
January 4	—N/a			"Si Antes Te Hubiera Conocido"	Karol G	
January 11	—N/a			"Si Antes Te Hubiera Conocido"	Karol G	
January 18	—N/a			"Si Antes Te Hubiera Conocido"	Karol G	
January 25	—N/a			"Si Antes Te Hubiera Conocido"	Karol G	
February 1	—N/a			"Si Antes Te Hubiera Conocido"	Karol G	
February 8	—N/a			"Si Antes Te Hubiera Conocido"	Karol G	
February 15	—N/a			"Si Antes Te Hubiera Conocido"	Karol G	
February 22	—N/a			"Baile Inolvidable"	Bad Bunny	
March 1	—N/a			"Baile Inolvidable"	Bad Bunny	
March 8	—N/a			"Baile Inolvidable"	Bad Bunny	
March 15	—N/a			"Baile Inolvidable"	Bad Bunny	
March 22	—N/a			"Baile Inolvidable"	Bad Bunny	
March 29	—N/a			"Baile Inolvidable"	Bad Bunny	
April 4	—N/a			"Baile Inolvidable"	Bad Bunny	
April 12	"Baile Inolvidable"	Bad Bunny		"Baile Inolvidable"	Bad Bunny	
April 19	"Baile Inolvidable"	Bad Bunny		"Desde Hoy"	Natti Natasha	
April 26	"Baile Inolvidable"	Bad Bunny		"Desde Hoy"	Natti Natasha	
May 3	"Baile Inolvidable"	Bad Bunny		"Desde Hoy"	Natti Natasha	
May 10	"Baile Inolvidable"	Bad Bunny		"Raíces"	Gloria Estefan	
May 17	"Baile Inolvidable"	Bad Bunny		"Desde Hoy"	Natti Natasha	
May 24	"Baile Inolvidable"	Bad Bunny		"Si Antes Te Hubiera Conocido"	Karol G	
May 31	"Baile Inolvidable"	Bad Bunny		"Si Antes Te Hubiera Conocido"	Karol G	
June 7	"Baile Inolvidable"	Bad Bunny		"En Privado"	Xavi and Manuel Turizo	
June 14	"Baile Inolvidable"	Bad Bunny		"Vestido Rojo"	Silvestre Dangond and Emilia	
June 21	"Baile Inolvidable"	Bad Bunny		"Desde Hoy"	Natti Natasha	
June 28	"Baile Inolvidable"	Bad Bunny		"How Deep Is Your Love"	Prince Royce	
July 5	"Papasito"	Karol G		"How Deep Is Your Love"	Prince Royce	
July 12	"Baile Inolvidable"	Bad Bunny		"How Deep Is Your Love"	Prince Royce	
July 19	"Baile Inolvidable"	Bad Bunny		"How Deep Is Your Love"	Prince Royce	
July 26	"Baile Inolvidable"	Bad Bunny		"How Deep Is Your Love"	Prince Royce	
August 2	"Baile Inolvidable"	Bad Bunny		"Si Antes Te Hubiera Conocido"	Karol G	
August 9	"Baile Inolvidable"	Bad Bunny		"La Vecina (No Sé Na')"	Gloria Estefan	
August 16	"Baile Inolvidable"	Bad Bunny		"La Vecina (No Sé Na')"	Gloria Estefan	
August 23	"Baile Inolvidable"	Bad Bunny		"La Vecina (No Sé Na')"	Gloria Estefan	
August 30	"Baile Inolvidable"	Bad Bunny		"La Vecina (No Sé Na')"	Gloria Estefan	
September 6	"Baile Inolvidable"	Bad Bunny		"La Vecina (No Sé Na')"	Gloria Estefan	
September 13	"Baile Inolvidable"	Bad Bunny		"La Vecina (No Sé Na')"	Gloria Estefan	
September 20	"Baile Inolvidable"	Bad Bunny		"La Vecina (No Sé Na')"	Gloria Estefan	
September 27	"Baile Inolvidable"	Bad Bunny		"La Vecina (No Sé Na')"	Gloria Estefan	
October 4	"Baile Inolvidable"	Bad Bunny		"Sonríele"	Daddy Yankee	
October 11	"Baile Inolvidable"	Bad Bunny		"Sonríele"	Daddy Yankee	
October 18	"Baile Inolvidable"	Bad Bunny		"Sonríele"	Daddy Yankee	
October 25	"Baile Inolvidable"	Bad Bunny		"Sonríele"	Daddy Yankee	
November 1	"Baile Inolvidable"	Bad Bunny		"Como se Compara"	Luis Figeroa	
November 8	"Baile Inolvidable"	Bad Bunny		"I Want It That Way"	Prince Royce	
November 15	"Baile Inolvidable"	Bad Bunny		"I Want It That Way"	Prince Royce	
November 22	"Baile Inolvidable"	Bad Bunny		"I Want It That Way"	Prince Royce	
November 29	"Baile Inolvidable"	Bad Bunny		"I Want It That Way"	Prince Royce	
December 6	"Baile Inolvidable"	Bad Bunny		"I Want It That Way"	Prince Royce	
December 13	"Baile Inolvidable"	Bad Bunny		"I Want It That Way"	Prince Royce	
December 20	"Baile Inolvidable"	Bad Bunny		"I Want It That Way"	Prince Royce	
December 27	"Baile Inolvidable"	Bad Bunny		"Lokita Por Mí"	Romeo Santos and Prince Royce	
