= All Too Well: The Short Film =

2021 short film by Taylor Swift

- Official poster
- Directed by: Taylor Swift
- Written by: Taylor Swift
- Based on: "All Too Well (10 Minute Version) (Taylor's Version) (From the Vault)" by Taylor Swift
- Produced by: Taylor Swift; Saul Germaine
- Starring: Sadie Sink; Dylan O'Brien; Taylor Swift
- Cinematography: Rina Yang
- Edited by: Ted Guard
- Production companies: Taylor Swift Productions; Saul Projects
- Distributed by: PolyGram Entertainment and Republic Records (YouTube); Universal Pictures (Theatrical)
- Release date: November 12, 2021
- Running time: 15 minutes
- Country: United States
- Language: English

All Too Well: The Short Film is a 2021 musical romantic drama short film written and directed by the American singer-songwriter Taylor Swift in her filmmaking debut. A film adaptation of her critically-acclaimed song "All Too Well" (2012), it is set against the backdrop of the uncut, 10-minute version of the song released in 2021. It stars Sadie Sink and Dylan O'Brien as a romantic couple whose up-and-down relationship ultimately falls apart, compounded by their age gap. Swift cited the works of Barbara Stanwyck, John Cassavetes, and Noah Baumbach as artistic influences upon the film.

Produced by Saul Germaine and Taylor Swift Productions, All Too Well: The Short Film was released on November 12, 2021, in select theaters by Universal Pictures and on YouTube by UMG's PolyGram Entertainment and Republic Records, in conjunction with Swift's second re-recorded album, Red (Taylor's Version). After a premiere at the AMC Theatres in Lincoln Square, New York City, it had a limited theatrical release in major cities as well as special screenings at the 2022 Tribeca and Toronto film festivals. It received critical acclaim, with particular praise directed towards Swift's direction as a debut filmmaker as well as the acting, script, drama, and production values.

The film garnered several awards and nominations from music and film organizations, including an American Music Award, a Hollywood Critics Association Award, an Art Directors Guild Award and a Grammy Award for Best Music Video; at the 2022 MTV Video Music Awards, it won Video of the Year and Best Direction, making Swift the first artist in VMA history to win Best Direction for a self-directed work.

== Synopsis ==
All Too Well: The Short Film is a film adaptation of the 10-minute version of the song "All Too Well" by the American singer-songwriter Taylor Swift. It also functions as a music video for the song. A literary quote from the Chilean poet Pablo Neruda—"Love is so short, forgetting is so long", from his poem "Puedo Escribir Los Versos"—opens the film. (Note: The poem is popularly known by its English-language title "Tonight I Can Write". The original Spanish-language line of the quote is "Es tan corto el amor, y es tan largo el olvido." Swift previously included the quote in the liner notes of Red (2012).) The story chronicles the relationship of two doomed lovers, Her and Him, compounded by an age gap. "All Too Well (10 Minute Version)" plays throughout the film, except during a dialogued conflict between Her and Him. The song details a blooming romance between two people and its subsequent dissolution and resulting heartbreak. The nearly 15-minute film is divided into seven chapters—"An Upstate Escape", "The First Crack in the Glass", "Are You Real?", "The Breaking Point", "The Reeling", "The Remembering", and the epilogue "Thirteen Years Gone"—describing the relationship between Her and Him through various phases.

== Plot ==
The story starts with the couple lying in bed together, Her (Sadie Sink) mesmerized by Him (Dylan O'Brien). (Note: At the red carpet premiere, when asked if his character was based on American actor Jake Gyllenhaal, whom the song is speculated to be about, O'Brien said that his character's name is Brandon.) They venture into upstate New York in a car. Her leaves her red scarf at a house belonging to Him's sister. Their relationship takes a turn at a dinner party, where Him ignores his girlfriend with a hand gesture, as he is busy catching up with his friends, making Her uncomfortable. They fight afterwards; Him is arrogant and dismissive, while a distraught Her is heartbroken but still wants to stay with Him. He apologizes and kisses Her to end the argument, and they dance in the refrigerator light. Him starts to distance himself from Her, eventually breaking up with her. A devastated Her weeps in bed, ignoring his phone calls. Her is seen typing on her typewriter and crumpling paper sheets. A montage shows Her alone at parties and sorrowful on her 21st birthday. (Note: Her is also seen in her bed wearing a plaid shirt that Him once wore during their trip upstate.) Him's life carries on as he walks alone down a Brooklyn street, recalling some of the happier moments in his relationship with Her. The film then jumps 13 years into the future, where Her (Taylor Swift) (Note: Credited as Her, later on) has become an author and released her book All Too Well, (Note: The book cover highly resembles that of The Giving Tree, a popular children's storybook about a divisive relationship between a boy and the eponymous tree.) presumably detailing the heartache she went through with Him. She reads from the book to an audience in a packed bookstore. Outside the store, an older Him stands in the snow, watching Her through the window, wearing the same scarf she left behind 13 years ago.

== Conception and production ==
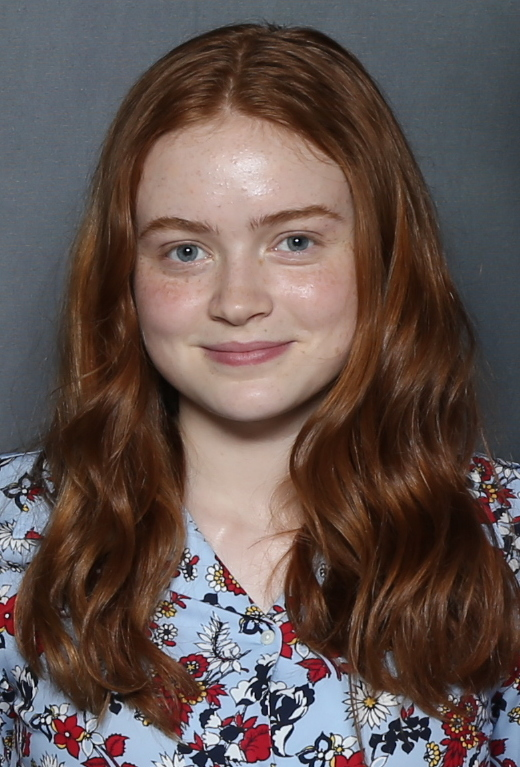
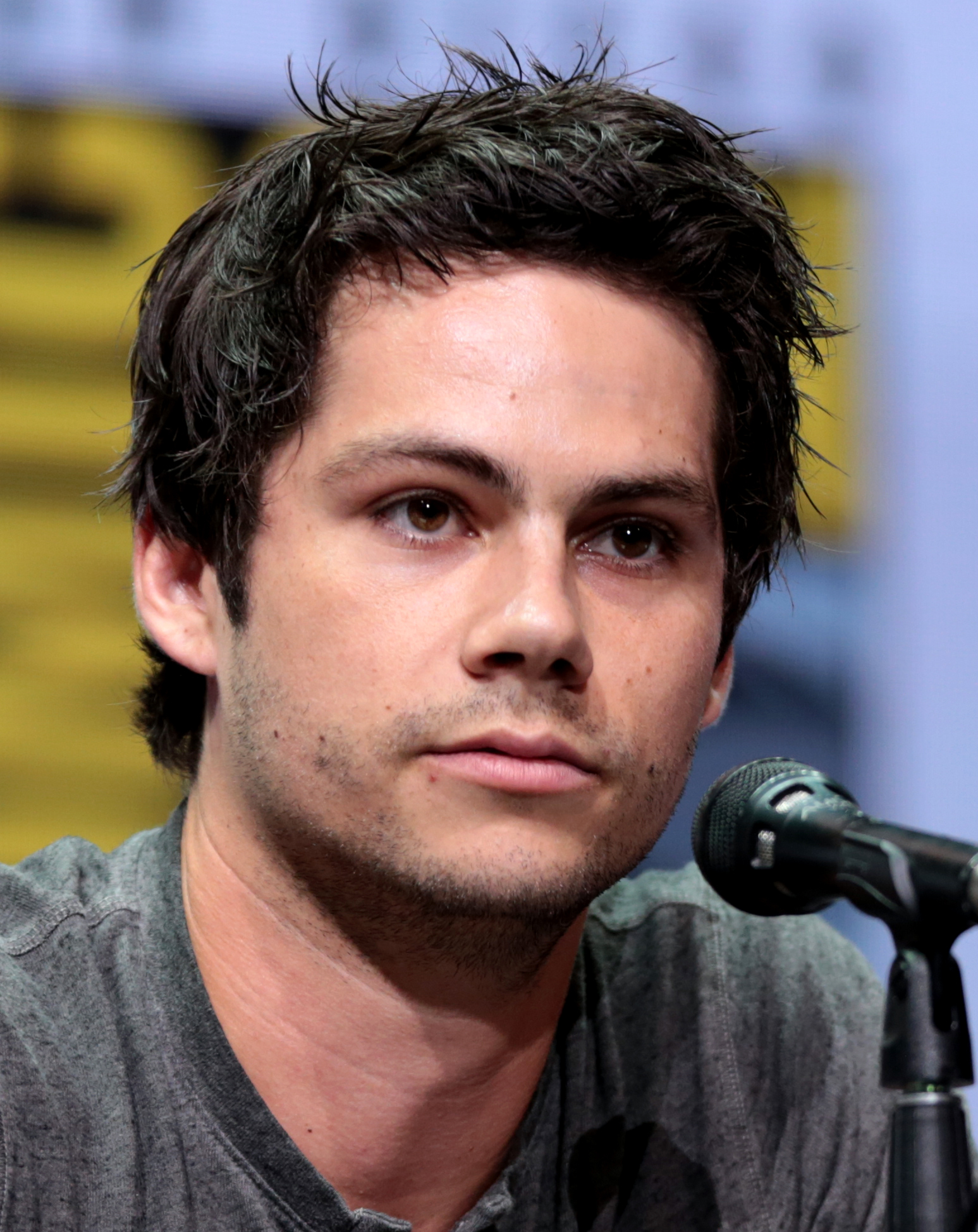
Sadie Sink (left) and Dylan O'Brien (right), both of whom were Swift's first choice to play the leads, instantly accepted the offer.

Swift stated via her social media that All Too Well: The Short Film was shot on 35 mm film by Japanese-Korean-British cinematographer Rina Yang. Yang used an "Arri Arriflex 235 for handheld and steadicam, and Panavision MXL for dolly work"; lenses were Panavision Primo, with 11:1 Primo zoom. She shot exterior scenes on Kodak Ektachrome—the same kind she had used to shoot the HBO television series Euphoria. Swift cited "Barbara Stanwyck films, particularly 1937's Stella Dallas", as artistic influences upon her film in addition to those of John Cassavetes and Noah Baumbach, especially his drama film Marriage Story (2019), among other works. She also mentioned the films The Way We Were (1973), Love Story (1970), and Kramer vs. Kramer (1979) as sources of inspiration.

Swift said she wanted tell a story about "girlhood calcifying into this bruised adulthood" with the film. On Late Night with Seth Meyers, she said she cast Sink and O'Brien because they were the only two people she imagined playing the roles, noting that she was a fan of O'Brien's works and that she would not have proceeded with making the film had Sink turned down the offer. Swift explained that she likes "working with friends or people who I think would be excited about working with me" and added that she was "just blown away by what [Sink and O'Brien] did—they went out and left it all on the field". Sink said she accepted Swift's offer without hesitation, as she was a fan of Swift, and was also interested in playing a "more rounded and mature" role while portraying her Stranger Things character Max Mayfield during production of the series' fourth season. Shawn Levy, an executive producer for Stranger Things, makes a cameo appearance as the father of Sink's character in the short film. Swift further revealed that Sink and O'Brien "were so electric and [improvising] a lot of what they were doing that we just couldn't take the camera off [them]". At the end of the film, Swift played an older version of Sink's character.

== Release and promotion ==
In June 2021, Swift announced that her re-recorded album, Red (Taylor's Version), a re-recording of her fourth studio album Red (2012), would be released on November 19, 2021; the release date was later moved up to November 12. It contains both the re-recorded version of the track "All Too Well" and its 10-minute uncut version as a bonus track "from the vault". On November 5, 2021, Good Morning America revealed a teaser for the short film. The teaser featured a vintage car driving down on a quiet road surrounded by autumnal trees, as well as the names of the cast members. All Too Well: The Short Film is a dramatized account of the incidents and dynamics of the relationship described in the song. It is about "an effervescent, curious young woman who ends up completely out of her depth", stated Swift. She described it as an expression of her gratitude to her fans for their reception to the song "All Too Well" over the years.

The film's world premiere took place on November 13 at the AMC Theatres in Lincoln Square, New York City with handpicked fans among those who attended. Each audience member received an autographed movie poster and a custom packet of tissues. Swift performed "All Too Well (10 Minute Version)" in the theatre after the screening. The film was later released on the same day on YouTube, 13 hours after the album's release at midnight. It had a limited theatrical release in major cities.

It was also screened in two film festivals. On June 11, 2022, All Too Well: The Short Film had a special screening at the 2022 Tribeca Film Festival at the Beacon Theatre in New York City. The film was screened in its 35 mm form for the first time at the 2022 Toronto International Film Festival on September 9, 2022, at the TIFF Bell Lightbox in Toronto, Ontario.

A video of behind the scenes from the short film was released on December 8, 2022.

== Reception ==
=== Critical response ===
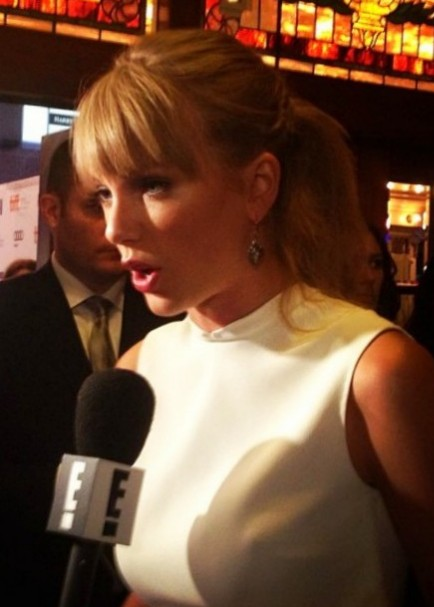
Swift's direction drew critical praise.

All Too Well: The Short Film received acclaim from film critics, with particular emphasis on Swift's vision as a filmmaker. Variety's Ramin Setoodeh dubbed the short film "a music video on steroids meets a Noah Baumbach movie". Brittany Spanos of Rolling Stone called it a "dramatic and moving" film that "digs deep into heartache and scarf lore". Rhian Daly of NME said the film underscores "the emotional power of [Swift's] storytelling" with "devastating cinematography" and "electric performances" by Sink and O'Brien. Collider's Ryan Louis Mantilla reported that "Sink and O'Brien bring Swift's characters to life with vividly emotional performances telling an incredibly moving tale of love, power, gaslighting, and heartache in the 15-minute film."

Karl Quinn, in his review for The Sydney Morning Herald, complimented the "gorgeously cliched Notebook-style" screenplay, Swift's direction, and the "finely tuned" performances of Sink and O'Brien. Vogue's Sarah Spellings said many of the film's scenes felt like "in-jokes with the audience" and commended the midway dialogue featuring an argument between Sink and O'Brien's characters: "It felt less like a real fight and more like how you describe a fight to your friends later. In other words, it was a depiction of how a fight feels." In USA Today, Patrick Ryan wrote that the film was "operatic in its emotions and scope" and felt the argument scene was "particularly gut-wrenching". Billboard's Paul Grein also praised the argument, saying the writing in the scene is "so vivid that it's easy to see Swift winning an Oscar for screenwriting one day".

Laura Coates, publishing on RogerEbert.com, commended Swift's direction, the "meticulous lighting and eye for production design", Yang's camerawork, and the "electric" chemistry between Sink and O'Brien. Coates highlighted the argument scene as well: "Though the instinct may be to emphasize the volatility of their relationship with quick, jarring cuts, the unflinching persistence of the single take means the viewer is left with nothing to do but squirm and despair as we watch their relationship fall apart before our eyes." In a less favorable review, Renaldo Matadeen of Comic Book Resources described the film as a "powerful character portrait" with "great cinematography and clever pacing", but felt that Swift's appearance near the end as a grown Sink "takes away from the artistic, auteur feel" of the film, preventing it from being a "perfect indie film".

The film briefly had the highest rating on film review site Letterboxd before Parasite (2019) regained the status.

=== Commercial performance ===
Following its release to YouTube, the film was the number-one trending video on the platform with over 14 million views. It amassed 32 million views in its first three days. The short film helped its source material, "All Too Well (10 Minute Version)", debut atop the Billboard Hot 100 chart, garnering Swift her eighth number-one song in the US, and the longest song ever to top the chart—a feat recognized in Guinness World Records. As of September 2024, the film has over 101 million views on YouTube.

== Accolades ==
All Too Well: The Short Film has received awards recognition in a diverse set of fields. It was nominated in five categories at the 2022 MTV Video Music Awards, including Swift's fifth nomination for Video of the Year, (Note: Before the film, Swift had been nominated for Video of the Year for "I Knew You Were Trouble" in 2013, "Bad Blood" in 2015, "You Need to Calm Down' in 2019, and "The Man" in 2020.)—a record tied with Beyoncé for the most Video of the Year nominations; Swift was also nominated for Best Direction for a third consecutive year, following the music videos of "The Man" in 2020 and "Willow" in 2021. The film won Video of the Year and Best Longform Video, and Swift won Best Direction; she became the first artist to win Video of the Year three times, and the first artist to win Video of the Year for a self-directed video. She won four awards at the 2022 MTV Europe Music Awards, including Best Artist and Best Pop Act for the first time, and tied with Lady Gaga as the most awarded woman in EMA history (12 each). Swift won six awards at the 2022 American Music Awards, including Favorite Music Video and Artist of the Year. In 2023, Swift became the first artist to win the Grammy Award for Best Music Video as sole director; it was her second win in the category after "Bad Blood" (2015).

Awards and nominations for All Too Well: The Short Film
Award	Date of ceremony	Category	Recipient(s)	Result	Ref.
NME Awards	March 2, 2022	Best Music Video	Taylor Swift	Nominated	
ADG Excellence in Production Design Awards	March 5, 2022	Short Format: Web Series, Music Video or Commercial	Ethan Tobman, Mila Khalevich, Emil Pilosov	Won	
Short Shorts Film Festival & Asia	June 7, 2022	Global Spotlight Award	Swift	Nominated	
Set Decorators Society of America Awards	August 2, 2022	Best Achievement in Decor/Design of a Short Format	Tobman, Khalevich	Nominated	
MTV Video Music Awards	August 28, 2022	Video of the Year	Swift	Won	
MTV Video Music Awards	August 28, 2022	Best Longform Video	Swift	Won	
MTV Video Music Awards	August 28, 2022	Best Direction	Swift	Won	
MTV Video Music Awards	August 28, 2022	Best Editing	Ted Guard	Nominated	
MTV Video Music Awards	August 28, 2022	Best Cinematography	Rina Yang	Nominated	
UK Music Video Awards	October 27, 2022	Best Cinematography in a Video	Yang, Swift	Nominated	
MTV Europe Music Awards	November 13, 2022	Best Video	Swift	Won	
MTV Europe Music Awards	November 13, 2022	Best Longform Video	Swift	Won	
American Music Awards	November 21, 2022	Favorite Music Video	Swift	Won	
Grammy Awards	February 5, 2023	Best Music Video	Swift, Saul Germaine	Won	
Hollywood Critics Association Awards	February 24, 2023	Best Short Film	Swift	Won	

== Legacy ==
Publications have described the short film as one of the biggest newsmakers and pop culture moments of 2021. iHeartRadio called it a "cultural sensation", and the short film also invited "Oscar buzz", Google searches of Sink and O'Brien reached an all-time high upon its release. Various media outlets described the short film's absence from the shortlist for the 2023 Academy Award for Best Live Action Short Film a snub.

Canadian singer Michael Bublé, in the music video for his 2022 single "I'll Never Not Love You", referenced and recreated iconic "love scenes" from various films with his wife, Luisana Lopilato; it included All Too Well: The Short Film, with Bublé as Him and Lopilato as Her.

The Department of English of the Queen's University at Kingston, a public research university in Ontario, Canada, offers a fall semester course titled "Taylor Swift's Literary Legacy (Taylor's Version)", with a syllabus requiring students to analyze many of Swift's works, such as All Too Well: The Short Film, to understand their literary references and sociopolitical relevance in contemporary culture.

Following the success of the short film, Swift was inspired to venture further into filmmaking. In December 2022, Searchlight Pictures announced that Swift has written an original script and will direct her debut feature film; details about the cast, plot, and title were withheld "until a later date". She took part in Variety's Directors on Directors series opposite British-Irish filmmaker Martin McDonagh to elucidate her filmmaking approach.

According to Kodak, the short film, which was photographed in 35mm Ektachrome by Yang, contributed to generating an "enormous interest" in the format.

== See also ==
- Folklore: The Long Pond Studio Sessions, a concert documentary directed by Swift in her solo directorial debut.
- Miss Americana, a documentary about Swift's life and career.
- Taylor Swift: The End Of An Era, a documentary about Taylor Swift's Eras Tour.
