= American Music Award for Best Music Video =

American music award

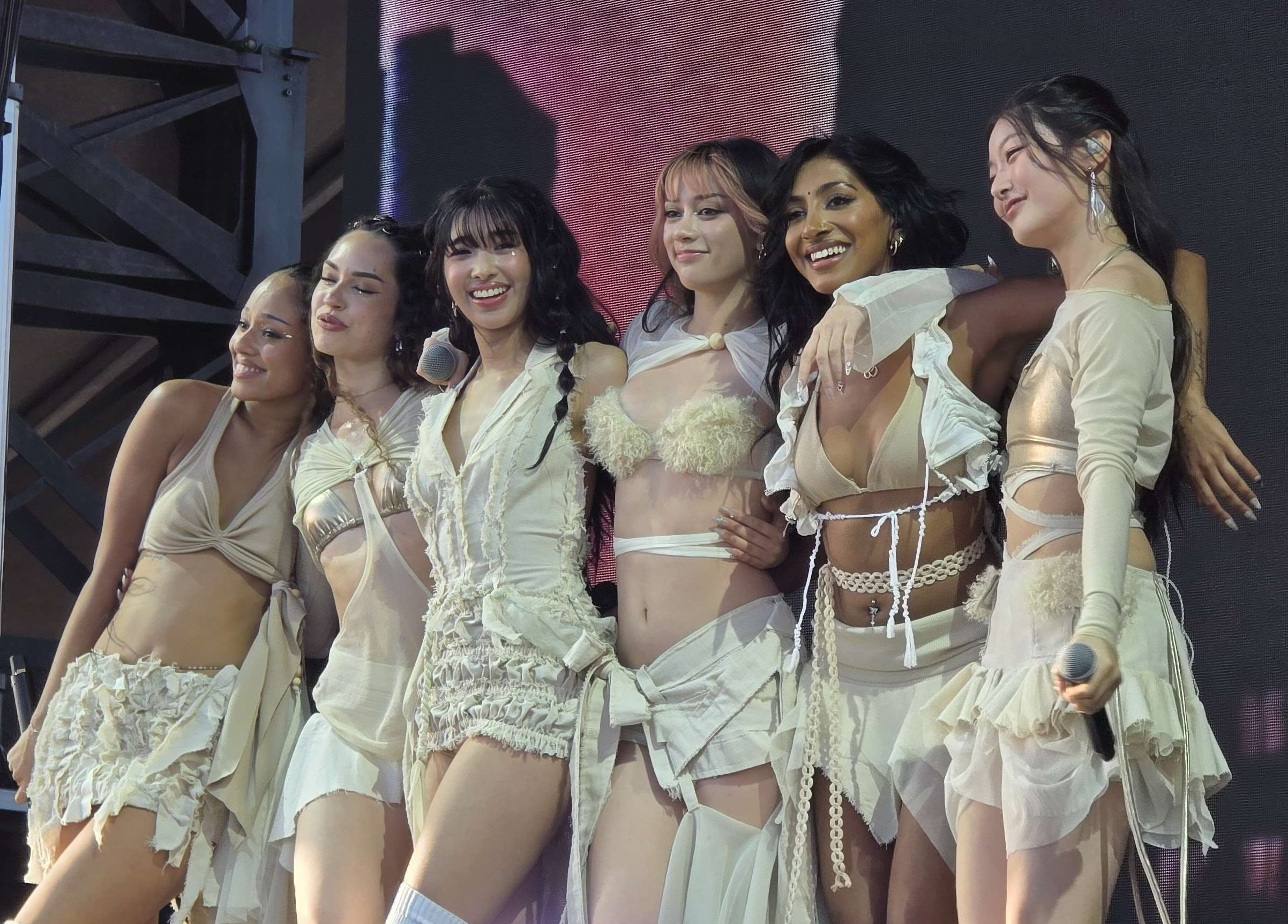
- "Gnarly" by Katseye is the most recent recipient
- Country: United States
- Presented by: American Music Awards
- First award: 2016
- Currently held by: Katseye – "Gnarly"

Highlights
- Most wins: Taylor Swift (3)
- Most nominations: Taylor Swift (4)
- Website: theamas.com

The American Music Award for Best Music Video (previously known as Video of the Year and Favorite Music Video) is an award presented to music videos that was introduced in 2016. Before the category was introduced, the AMAs previously honored music videos in separate categories from 1984 until 1988.

== Winners and nominees ==
=== 2010s ===
Year	Artist	Video	Ref
2016 (44th)
2016 (44th)	Justin Bieber	"Sorry"	
2016 (44th)	Desiigner	"Panda"	
2016 (44th)	Rihanna (featuring Drake)	"Work"	
2017 (45th)
2017 (45th)	Bruno Mars	"That's What I Like"	
2017 (45th)	Luis Fonsi and Daddy Yankee	"Despacito"	
2017 (45th)	Ed Sheeran	"Shape of You"	
2018 (46th)
2018 (46th)	Camila Cabello (featuring Young Thug)	"Havana"	
2018 (46th)	Cardi B	"Bodak Yellow"	
2018 (46th)	Drake	"God's Plan"	
2019 (47th)
2019 (47th)	Taylor Swift	"You Need to Calm Down"	
2019 (47th)	Billie Eilish	"Bad Guy"	
2019 (47th)	Ariana Grande	"7 Rings"	
2019 (47th)	Halsey	"Without Me"	
2019 (47th)	Lil Nas X (featuring Billy Ray Cyrus)	"Old Town Road"	

=== 2020s ===
Year	Artist	Video	Ref
2020 (48th)
2020 (48th)	Taylor Swift	"Cardigan"	
2020 (48th)	Doja Cat	"Say So"	
2020 (48th)	Future (featuring Drake)	"Life Is Good"	
2020 (48th)	Lady Gaga and Ariana Grande	"Rain on Me"	
2020 (48th)	The Weeknd	"Blinding Lights"	
2021 (49th)
2021 (49th)	Lil Nas X	"Montero (Call Me by Your Name)"	
2021 (49th)	Silk Sonic (Bruno Mars and Anderson .Paak)	"Leave the Door Open"	
2021 (49th)	Cardi B	"Up"	
2021 (49th)	Olivia Rodrigo	"Drivers License"	
2021 (49th)	The Weeknd	"Save Your Tears"	
2022 (50th)
2022 (50th)	Taylor Swift	All Too Well: The Short Film	
2022 (50th)	Adele	"Easy on Me"	
2022 (50th)	Bad Bunny and Chencho Corleone	"Me Porto Bonito"	
2022 (50th)	Lil Nas X (featuring Jack Harlow)	"Industry Baby"	
2022 (50th)	Harry Styles	"As It Was"	
2023 – 24	—N/a		
2025 (51st)
2025 (51st)	Lady Gaga and Bruno Mars	"Die with a Smile"	
2025 (51st)	Benson Boone	"Beautiful Things"	
2025 (51st)	Karol G	"Si Antes Te Hubiera Conocido"	
2025 (51st)	Kendrick Lamar	"Not Like Us"	
2025 (51st)	Shaboozey	"A Bar Song (Tipsy)"	
2026 (52nd)
2026 (52nd)	Katseye	"Gnarly"	
2026 (52nd)	Rosalía, Björk and Yves Tumor	"Berghain"	
2026 (52nd)	Sabrina Carpenter	"Manchild"	
2026 (52nd)	Taylor Swift	"The Fate of Ophelia"	
2026 (52nd)	Tyla	"Chanel"	

== Category facts ==
=== Multiple wins ===
3 wins

- Taylor Swift

2 wins

- Bruno Mars

=== Multiple nominations ===
4 nominations

- Taylor Swift

3 nominations

- Drake
- Lil Nas X
- Bruno Mars

2 nominations

- Ariana Grande
- Cardi B
- Lady Gaga
- The Weeknd

== See also ==
- American Music Award for Favorite Pop/Rock Video (1984–1988)
- American Music Award for Favorite Pop/Rock Male Video Artist (1985–1987)
- American Music Award for Favorite Pop/Rock Female Video Artist (1985–1987)
- American Music Award for Favorite Pop/Rock Band/Duo/Group Video Artist (1985–1987)
- American Music Award for Favorite Soul/R&B Video (1984–1988)
- American Music Award for Favorite Soul/R&B Male Video Artist (1985–1987)
- American Music Award for Favorite Soul/R&B Female Video Artist (1985–1987)
- American Music Award for Favorite Soul/R&B Band/Duo/Group Video Artist (1985–1987)
- American Music Award for Favorite Country Video (1984–1988)
- American Music Award for Favorite Country Male Video Artist (1985–1987)
- American Music Award for Favorite Country Female Video Artist (1985–1987)
- American Music Award for Favorite Country Band/Duo/Group Video Artist (1985–1987)
