= All Too Well =

2012 song by Taylor Swift

Song by Taylor Swift

from the album Red
- Written: 2011
- Released: October 22, 2012
- Studio: Pain in the Art (Nashville)
- Genre: Country; power ballad; pop rock; soft rock
- Length: 5:29
- Label: Big Machine
- Songwriters: Taylor Swift; Liz Rose
- Producers: Taylor Swift; Nathan Chapman

Audio video
- "All Too Well" on YouTube

"All Too Well" is a song by the American singer-songwriter Taylor Swift. Written by Swift and Liz Rose, the song was first produced by Swift and Nathan Chapman for her fourth studio album, Red (2012). After a 2019 dispute regarding the ownership of Swift's masters, she re-recorded the song as "All Too Well (Taylor's Version)" and released an unabridged "10 Minute Version" as part of the re-recorded album Red (Taylor's Version) in November 2021. (Note: The "10 Minute Version" is officially titled "All Too Well (10 Minute Version) (Taylor's Version) (From the Vault)".)

The lyrics of "All Too Well" narrate a failed romantic relationship, recalling the intimate memories and exploring the painful aftermath. The detail of a scarf that the narrator left at the house of her ex-lover's sister generated widespread interpretations and became a popular culture phenomenon. The 2012 version is a slow-burning power ballad combining styles of country and rock. The "10 Minute Version", produced by Swift and Jack Antonoff, has an atmospheric pop rock production. She performed the song at the 2014 Grammy Awards and included it in the set lists for two of her world tours: the Red Tour (2013–2014) and the Eras Tour (2023–2024).

"All Too Well" charted in Canada and the United States in 2012. The "Taylor's Version" re-recording peaked atop the Billboard Global 200 and on the charts of Australia, Canada, Ireland, Malaysia, New Zealand, and Singapore, and became the longest song to top the US Billboard Hot 100. Rolling Stone included it at number 69 in their 2021 revision of the "500 Greatest Songs of All Time". Critics praised the "10 Minute Version" for providing a richer context with its additional verses. The short film version of this re-recording received a Grammy nomination for Song of the Year at the 65th Annual Grammy Awards. Swift directed All Too Well: The Short Film to accompany it, which won the Grammy Award for Best Music Video.

== Background and release ==
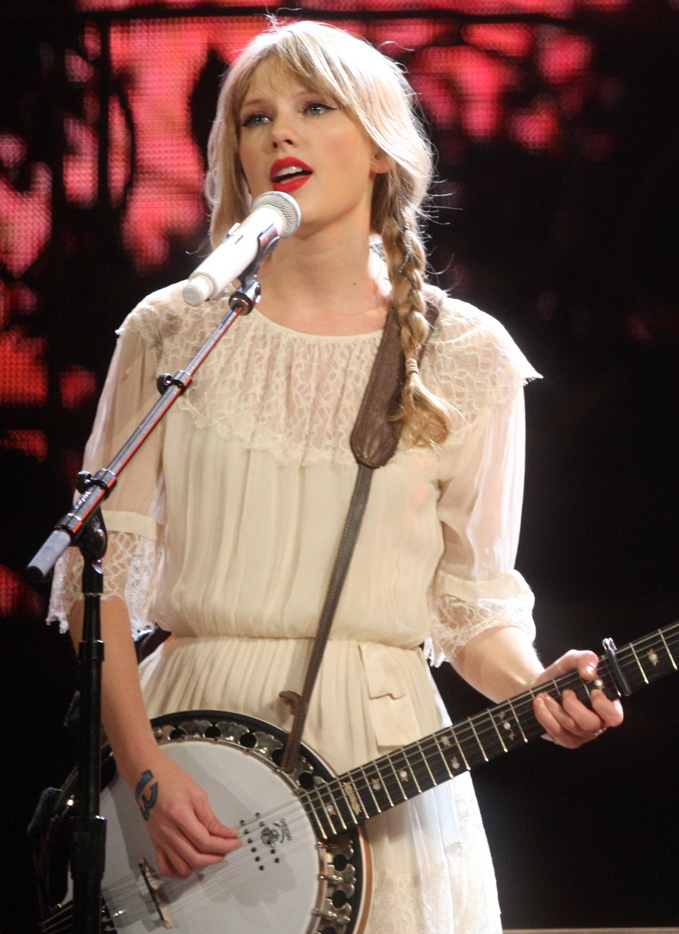
Swift (pictured in 2012) began writing the song during rehearsals for the Speak Now World Tour in February 2011.

Taylor Swift waѕ inspired by her tumultuous feelings after a breakup while conceiving her fourth studio album, Red (2012). "All Too Well" was the first song Swift wrote for Red. During a February 2011 rehearsal of the Speak Now World Tour, she ad-libbed some lyrics to the song while playing a four-chord guitar riff as her touring band spontaneously played backing instruments. Swift told Rolling Stone that this relationship caused "a few roller coasters", and she channeled the tumult into the song. She told the New York Times that the impromptu performance was "a very emotional rant." She recalled being very sad to the point where "sadness is you, you are sadness." According to the booklets of Swift's 2019 album Lover, the final draft was completed a month later.

Swift asked Liz Rose, who had co-written songs on her first albums, to co-write "All Too Well". Rose said that it was an unexpected collaboration after not having worked with Swift for some years; the last time they worked together was on Swift's 2008 album Fearless. When Rose agreed to collaborate, she recalled that Swift had come up with the melody. In an interview with Good Morning America, Swift said that the song was "the hardest to write on the album", saying that it took her some time "to filter through everything [she] wanted to put in the song" without making it lengthy with the help from Rose. Rose said that the song was originally "10, 12 or 15 minutes long" or "probably a 20-minute song" before trimming. The final album version is 5 minutes and 28 seconds long, the longest song on Red. It was produced by Swift and Nathan Chapman.

Red was released on October 22, 2012, by Big Machine Records. After Red was released, "All Too Well" debuted at number 80 on the Billboard Hot 100 chart dated November 10, 2012; it also charted at number 17 on Hot Country Songs and number 58 on Country Airplay. The Recording Industry Association of America (RIAA) in 2018 certified the track gold for crossing 500,000 units based on sales and streams. The song also peaked at number 59 on the Canadian Hot 100, and it was certified platinum in Australia, gold in Brazil and Portugal, and silver in the United Kingdom.

== Music ==
"All Too Well"
Chronicling a fallen relationship, "All Too Well" builds up with overdubbed guitars, drums, and strings. Its sound blends styles of country, folk, and rock.

Composed in the key of C major, "All Too Well" is a power ballad that is set over a 4/4 beat, with a tempo of 93 beats per minute. The track begins with acoustic guitar strumming and builds up to a big, eruptive crescendo in each refrain. The electric guitars intensify from subtle turnaround to full-chord playing, with a crunch sound processed through a Nobles ODR-1 overdrive pedal. Subtle in the mix are piano notes played in ostinato octaves of C and a synth layer. Jody Rosen, in an article for New York, wrote that the production "rises, like a slow-cresting wave".

Critics opined that "All Too Well" incorporated elements of country and rock. Bernard Perusse of the Edmonton Journal wrote that the song displayed influences of U2, and Rosen and Spin's Michael Robbins commented that its driving bassline was reminiscent of that from U2's "With or Without You" (1987). Slant Magazine's Jonathan Keefe wrote that the track progresses from "coffeehouse folk to arena rock". Bruce Warren, the assistant general manager of programming at WXPN, commented that the track has a soft rock production. Billboard and Craig S. Semon of the Telegram & Gazette described the genre as country, while Newsday said that the song has an "alt-country ache". Jon Dolan of Rolling Stone opined that "All Too Well" exemplified the "diaristic post-country rock" sound of Red, and in their list of the 50 best albums of 2012, the magazine dubbed the genre "Nashville pop rock". The music writers Damien Somville and Marine Benoit contended that the production contained the "fundamentals" of country pop and stadium rock.

== Lyrics and interpretations ==
The song is a recount of a fallen relationship that happened in the fall. The verses explore the memories in a loosely chronological order, using expository details. The song begins with details of a trip of two ex-lovers to Upstate New York ("We're singin' in the car, getting lost upstate") such as imagery of "autumn leaves falling down like pieces into place". When they visit the house of the love interest's sister during the Thanksgiving weekend, the narrator leaves her scarf at that place. The narrator then recalls the intimate moments with her ex-lover ("There we are again in the middle of the night/ Dancing around the kitchen in the refrigerator light") and the mundane details, such as photo albums, a twin-sized bed, and stopping at red lights. After each refrain, the narrator insists that those moments mattered ("I was there, I remember it all too well").

The bridge is where the track reaches its climax; Swift sings in her upper register and almost shouts with anger ("You call me up again, just to break me like a promise/ So casually cruel in the name of being honest"). Her narrator questions why the relationship fell apart, pondering whether it was because she "asked for too much". In the final verse, the narrator mentions the scarf previously detailed in the first verse ("But you keep my old scarf from that very first week/ 'Cause it reminds you of innocence and it smells like me"), asserting that the love she gave and felt was real and that the ex-partner must have felt the same.

Brittany Spanos of Rolling Stone wrote that the song describes "the pain of having to piece one's self back together again" after a crumbled relationship. Brad Nelson, in his reviews for The Atlantic and Pitchfork, said that the scarf imagery in the lyrics acts like a Chekhov's gun, symbolizing the persisting emotional flame of the romance long after it has physically ended. Nelson compared Swift's lyrics mentioning various memories in a loosely chronological timeline to the technique used in Bob Dylan's "Tangled Up in Blue" (1975) and wrote that it displayed "ambiguity" in Swift's songwriting about failed relationships by not blaming any sides and instead exploring the dissolution of a romance. Meanwhile, J. English of NPR thought that Swift's character in "All Too Well" both puts the blame on her "callous" ex-lover and "owns up to her naivete" for the loss of her innocence, departing from the one-sided blame on past songs such as "Dear John" (2010).

== Critical reviews ==
In reviews of Red, critics lauded "All Too Well" for its detail-heavy lyricism and deemed it the album's centerpiece. Dolan, Robbins, and Semon said that the imagery of the couple "dancing around the kitchen in the refrigerator light" was a highlight. Many reviewers picked "All Too Well" as the album's best track, including Jonathan Keefe for Slant Magazine, Sam Lansky for Billboard, Grady Smith for Entertainment Weekly, and Ben Rayner for the Toronto Star. Rosen wrote that it "takes a special songwriter to craft a sneering kiss-off that's also tender valediction", highlighting the bitter accusations ("You call me up again just to break me like a promise/ So casually cruel in the name of being honest") and the affectionate memories ("Photo album on the counter, your cheeks were turning red/ You used to be a little kid with glasses in a twin-size bed").

Some critics highlighted Swift's evolved songwriting. Nelson, in his review for The Atlantic, complimented how Swift expressed "ambiguity" and said that the scarf imagery, like a Chekov's gun, makes it "an exhilarating piece of writing". He added that "All Too Well" explores the dissolution of a romance "so delicately" that he found himself contemplating the song similar to how he would do to a Leonard Cohen song. Keefe highlighted the bridge for featuring one of Swift's "best-ever lines" and how "the song explodes into a full-on bloodletting", American Songwriter's Jewly Hight lauded the portrayal of heartbreak using "tangible details", and PopMatters's Arnold Pan said the song shows how Swift "has amped things up" by "combining the kind of drama that has come natural to her songwriting with a widescreen guitar-driven approach".

Other reviews also praised the track's sound. Robbins wrote that "All Too Well" is one of the Red tracks that "go down like pop punch spiked by pros". Semon described the song as an "acoustic-tinged tearjerker" that has "an alarming intimacy and intense urgency that might even take [Swift's] diehard fans off-guard", and The New York Times' Jon Caramanica said that the song "swells until it erupts". Newsday hailed "All Too Well" as the album's highlight "both in drama and execution, with Swift's vocals at their most emotional and her lyrics at their sharpest". In NME, Lucy Harbron selected its bridge as Swift's best and wrote that it was an "ultimate post-breakup big euphoric cry soundtrack".

Retrospectively, as Red received increasing critical acclaim in the years following its release, so did "All Too Well". In 2021, Katie Rosseinsky of The Standard described it as "the greatest single Swift never released".

== Charts ==
2012 chart performance2012 chart performance
Chart (2012)	Peak position
Canada Hot 100 (Billboard)	59
US Billboard Hot 100	80
US Hot Country Songs (Billboard)	17
US Country Airplay (Billboard)	58

2021 chart performance
Chart (2021)	Peak position
Austria (Ö3 Austria Top 40)	16
Belgium (Ultratop 50 Flanders)	49
Germany (GfK)	36
Portugal (AFP)	4
Switzerland (Schweizer Hitparade)	19

== Certifications ==
Certifications for "All Too Well"
Region	Certification	Certified units/sales
Australia (ARIA)	Platinum	70,000^{‡}
Brazil (Pro-Música Brasil)	Gold	30,000^{‡}
Portugal (AFP)	Gold	10,000^{‡}
New Zealand (RMNZ)	Gold	15,000^{‡}
United Kingdom (BPI)	Silver	200,000^{‡}
United States (RIAA)	Gold	500,000^{‡}
^{‡} Sales+streaming figures based on certification alone.

== 2021 re-recordings ==
"All Too Well (10 Minute Version)"

Promotional single by Taylor Swift

from the album Red (Taylor's Version)
- Written: 2011
- Released: November 12, 2021
- Studio: Conway (Hollywood); Electric Lady (New York); Rough Customer (Brooklyn)
- Genre: Pop rock
- Length: 10:13
- Label: Republic
- Songwriters: Taylor Swift; Liz Rose
- Producers: Taylor Swift; Jack Antonoff

Music video
- "All Too Well: The Short Film" on YouTube

Swift departed from Big Machine and signed a new contract with Republic Records in 2018. She began re-recording her first six studio albums in November 2020. The decision followed a 2019 dispute between Swift and the talent manager Scooter Braun, who acquired Big Machine Records, over the masters of Swift's albums that the label had released. By re-recording the albums, Swift had full ownership of the new masters, which enabled her to encourage licensing of her re-recorded songs for commercial use in hopes of substituting the Big Machine-owned masters. She denoted the re-recordings with a "Taylor's Version" subtitle.

=== Release ===
Red's re-recorded album, Red (Taylor's Version), was released on November 12, 2021. It features two versions of "All Too Well": a re-recording of the original album version subtitled "Taylor's Version", and an unabridged version subtitled "10 Minute Version (Taylor's Version) (From the Vault)". Speaking on The Tonight Show Starring Jimmy Fallon a day prior to the album's release, Swift said that the 10-minute version was recorded by the sound guy at a Speak Now World Tour rehearsal, and her mother Andrea Swift collected a CD recording of it; for the released version, she used notes and new lyricism to flesh out the song, no longer having the soundcheck recording.

Swift wrote and directed All Too Well: The Short Film based on the premise of "All Too Well (10 Minute Version)". It stars Sadie Sink and Dylan O'Brien as a couple in a romantic relationship that ultimately falls apart. Swift premiered the short film at a fan event in New York City on November 12, 2021, the same day that the re-recorded album was released; she also gave a surprise performance of the song there.

"All Too Well (10 Minute Version)" was released via Swift's online store on November 15, 2021, exclusively to US customers. The acoustic "Sad Girl Autumn" version, recorded at Aaron Dessner's Long Pond Studio in the Hudson Valley, was released on November 17. On June 11, 2022, the version used in the short film was made available for download and streaming, and the live performance at the premiere was made available for download, the same day Swift made an appearance at the Tribeca Film Festival to discuss her approach to making the film.

=== Music and lyrics ===
"All Too Well (10 Minute Version)"
A sample of the final verse and outro of "All Too Well (10 Minute Version)", showing the atmospheric production of synths, strings, percussion, distant violins and acoustic guitar arpeggios, and layered vocal harmonies

"All Too Well (10 Minute Version)" has an atmospheric pop rock production by Swift and Jack Antonoff. Compared to the shorter version, the guitars in the 10 Minute Version are more atmospheric and subdued, and the production is driven more prominently by keyboards and synths. From the 7:15 mark, the outro begins, and the production unfolds gradually with layers of orchestral timpani, layered vocal harmonies, synth arpeggiators, and trumpets. Towards the end, the distant violins and acoustic guitar arpeggios appear in successive waves, and the deep synth bass and synth layers blend with the programmed percussion, together with delayed snare drum brushes tuned to sixteenth notes. Somville and Benoit wrote that the production elements contributed to a lingering, "haunting" atmosphere.

Lyrically, there are three new verses: between the second verse and the second pre-chorus, after the bridge and before the third verse, and after the final verse. There is an extra stanza to the second chorus. The original song's male backing vocals are replaced with Swift's. Expanding on the narrative of the original, the 10-minute version traces the entire cycle of a fallen relationship with unsparing details—how the idyllic beginning days of the romance (with the boyfriend "tossing [her] the car keys/ 'Fuck the patriarchy' keychain on the ground") quickly soured as Swift's narrator was treated badly by the ex-boyfriend, how he never told her that he loved her, and how he stood her up on her 21st birthday.

She recalls that the ex-boyfriend was possibly ashamed of the relationship ("And there we are again when nobody had to know/ You kept me like a secret but I kept you like an oath") and used their age difference as an excuse to terminate the relationship, but he continued to date women of her age ("And I was never good at telling jokes, but the punchline goes/ 'I'll get older, but your lovers stay my age'"), a potential reference to the 1993 film Dazed and Confused. The breakup left the narrator breaking down in a bathroom, caught by an unnamed actress. In the outro, Swift's narrator contemplates whether the relationship "maimed you too", asserts that it was a "sacred prayer" and that both she and the ex-boyfriend "remembered it all too well".

=== Critical reception ===
"All Too Well (10 Minute Version)" was met with universal critical acclaim, often hailed as the standout track on Red (Taylor's Version) and a career highlight for Swift. Rolling Stone's Rob Sheffield lauded the 10-minute version for evoking even more intense emotions than the already sentimental five-minute song: "[It] sums up Swift at her absolute best." Helen Brown of The Independent stated the song is a more feminist proposition with its new lyrics. NME's Hannah Mylrea wrote, at its full intended length, "All Too Well (10 Minute Version)" confirms its place as an "epic", exhibiting proficient storytelling, vocal performance and instrumentation. Beth Kirkbride, writing for Clash, said the "epic" song "will go down in history as one of the best breakup songs ever written." Kate Solomon of i wrote the pain "feels raw" in Swift's voice.

Variety's Chris Willman dubbed the song as Swift's "holy grail", and felt glad the singer did not discard the original lyrics, which turn the song into "a stream-of-consciousness epic ballad", filled with more references and specifics of the song's story line. Reviewing for The Line of Best Fit, Paul Bridgewater opined the 10-minute version is "as disarming as it is fascinating"—"an artefact of [Swift's] songwriting and recording process." He asserted that the song magnifies the truncated version's drama and emotion. Slant Magazine critic Jonathan Keefe stated, while the 5-minute version solely focuses on catharsis from a painful relationship, the 10-minute version "more openly implicates the ex who's responsible for causing that pain", and changes the overall tone of "All Too Well" with its new verses and song structure.

Bobby Olivier of Spin praised the song as "Swift's single finest piece of songwriting". Melissa Reguieri, in her USA Today review, said the song "lopes through encyclopedic lyrics that both bite and wound in their honesty and pain." Sputnikmusic staff critic wrote "All Too Well (10 Minute Version)" is "not a flashy pop song or an endearingly rural slice of country" but simply a raw depiction of Swift's emotions, and concluded that the "towering breakup ballad" represents Swift's habit of "expressing these commonplace emotions in uniquely uncommon ways" in her writing. Lydia Burgham of The New Zealand Herald said the lyrics "paint a vivid picture of an ill-fated romance that cuts deep and captures the universal language of heartbreak." In the words of The New York Times critic Lindsay Zoladz, the song is "quite poignantly, about a young woman's attempt to find retroactive equilibrium in a relationship that was based on a power imbalance that she was not at first able to perceive."

The Guardian writer Laura Snapes also dubbed the song an epic track, "one that eviscerates her slick ex in a series of ever-more climactic verses that never resolve to a chorus, just a shuddered realisation of how vividly she recalls his disregard." Snapes associated the lyric "soldier who's returning half her weight" with Swift's eating disorder, and interpreted it as a nod to the physical manifestations of heartache. Spencer Kornhaber of The Atlantic wrote that "All Too Well (10 Minute Version)" contains more specificity in its lyrics, exuding "both warm nostalgia and cooling disdain", which "mesmerizes as Swift's cadence slips and slides against the steadily pounding beat", rather than cluttering the song as one would expect. Kornhaber also admired its outro and tempo shift. In a less complimentary review, Olivia Horn from Pitchfork felt the song was too long and sprawling, undermining the emotional climax of "All Too Well" (2012). In agreement, Zoladz preferred the five-minute version, but appreciated the 10-minute version for its "unapologetic messiness" with nuanced messages about female emotions and societal relationships. Reviewing for Vox, Phillip Garret applauded "All Too Well (10 Minute Version)" as a "whirlwind of a song", with the additional verses describing the context of "All Too Well" "in even greater detail than before".

GQ ranked "All Too Well (10 Minute Version)" as the best single of Swift's career, in October 2022. Alternative Press ranked it as the most emo track in Swift's catalog. The song appeared on several year-end rankings of the best songs of 2021.

Select year-end rankings of "All Too Well (10 Minute Version)"
Publication	List	Rank	Ref.
Billboard	The 100 Best Songs of 2021: Staff List	5	
Consequence	Top 50 Songs of 2021	40	
Genius	Top 50 Songs of 2021	10	
Business Insider	The Best Songs of 2021	1	
The New York Times	Jon Pareles's Top 25 Best Songs of 2021	4	
NPR Music	Best 100 Songs of 2021	100	
The Ringer	The Best Songs of 2021	3	
Rolling Stone	The 50 Best Songs of 2021	2	
Rolling Stone	Rob Sheffield's Top 25 Songs of 2021	1	
Time	The Best 10 Songs of 2021	3	
Variety	The Best Songs of 2021	1	

=== Accolades ===
Award and nominations for "All Too Well (10 Minute Version)"
Organization	Year	Award	Result	Ref.
NME Awards	2022	Best Music Video	Nominated	
ADG Excellence in Production Design Awards	2022	Music Video	Won	
iHeartRadio Music Awards	2022	Best Lyrics	Won	
Kids' Choice Awards	2022	Favorite Song	Nominated	
Joox Thailand Music Awards	2022	International Song of the Year	Nominated	
MTV Video Music Awards	2022	Video of the Year	Won	
MTV Video Music Awards	2022	Best Longform Video	Won	
MTV Video Music Awards	2022	Best Direction	Won	
MTV Video Music Awards	2022	Best Cinematography	Nominated	
MTV Video Music Awards	2022	Best Editing	Nominated	
MTV Europe Music Awards	2022	Best Video	Won	
MTV Europe Music Awards	2022	Best Longform Video	Won	
UK Music Video Awards	2022	Best Cinematography in a Video	Nominated	
American Music Awards	2022	Favorite Music Video	Won	
Grammy Awards	2023	Song of the Year (Note: Nominated as "All Too Well (10 Minute Version) (Taylor's Version) (The Short Film)")	Nominated	
Grammy Awards	2023	Best Music Video	Won	
AIMP Nashville Country Awards	2023	Song of the Year	Nominated	

=== Commercial performance ===
"All Too Well (Taylor's Version)" (Note: Combined chart statistics for both "All Too Well (Taylor's Version)" and "All Too Well (10 Minute Version)") debuted at number one on the Australian ARIA Singles Chart the same week Red (Taylor's Version) topped the Australian ARIA Albums Chart, earning Swift a fourth "Chart Double". (Note: Swift had achieved a "Chart Double" in 2014 (with 1989 and "Blank Space"), 2020 (twice; with Folklore and "Cardigan", and Evermore and "Willow").) It also helped Swift score a "Chart Double" on the Irish Singles Chart, her second number-one song in the country after "Look What You Made Me Do" (2017). The song was Swift's eighth number-one on the Canadian Hot 100, and entered the UK Singles Chart at number three, the longest song to reach the top five in the UK chart history.

On the US Billboard Hot 100, "All Too Well (Taylor's Version)" marked Swift's eighth number-one song. The song became the longest number-one song in chart history, surpassing Don McLean's 1972 song "American Pie", a feat recognized in the Guinness World Records. Topping the Billboard Hot 100 the same week Red (Taylor's Version) topped the Billboard 200, it marked Swift's record-extending third time to debut atop both charts the same week. (Note: After "Cardigan" and Folklore, and "Willow" and Evermore, both in 2020) As Swift's 30th top-10 entry, it made her the sixth artist to reach the milestone. It was her fifth song to top Billboard's Streaming Songs and 23rd to top Billboard's Digital Song Sales charts, extending her record as the female musician with the most chart toppers on both. "All Too Well (Taylor's Version)" is Swift's ninth number-one song on Billboard's Hot Country Songs chart, 18th number-one song on Billboard's Country Digital Song Sales chart, and sixth number-one song on Billboard's Country Streaming Songs chart, confirming her status as the artist with the most number-one songs on the latter two. In addition, the song is the first by a solo female artist to enter the Hot 100 and Hot Country Songs charts at the summit simultaneously.

=== Charts ===
==== Weekly charts ====
Weekly chart performance for "All Too Well (Taylor's Version)"
Chart (2021–2022)	Peak position
Argentina Hot 100 (Billboard)	79
Australia (ARIA)	1
Canada Hot 100 (Billboard)	1
Czech Republic Singles Digital (ČNS IFPI)	95
Denmark (Tracklisten)	33
Euro Digital Song Sales (Billboard)	5
Global 200 (Billboard)	1
Greece International (IFPI)	11
Hungary (Single Top 40)	17
Hungary (Stream Top 40)	31
Iceland (Tónlistinn)	25
India International Singles (IMI)	5
Ireland (IRMA)	1
Italy (FIMI)	69
Lithuania (AGATA)	39
Malaysia (RIM)	1
Netherlands (Dutch Top 40)	32
Netherlands (Single Top 100)	39
New Zealand (Recorded Music NZ)	1
Norway (VG-lista)	30
Philippines (Billboard)	8
Singapore (RIAS)	1
Slovakia (Singles Digitál Top 100)	81
South Africa (RISA)	13
Spain (PROMUSICAE)	25
Sweden (Sverigetopplistan)	47
UK Singles (Official Charts)	3
US Billboard Hot 100	1
US Adult Pop Airplay (Billboard)	25
US Hot Country Songs (Billboard)	1
Vietnam Hot 100 (Billboard)	82

==== Year-end charts ====
2022 year-end chart performance for "All Too Well (Taylor's Version)"
Chart (2022)	Position
Australia (ARIA)	98
Canada (Canadian Hot 100)	47
Global 200 (Billboard)	57
US Billboard Hot 100	76
US Hot Country Songs (Billboard)	15

=== Certifications ===
Certifications for "All Too Well (Taylor's Version)"
Region	Certification	Certified units/sales
Australia (ARIA) "10 Minute Version"	4× Platinum	280,000^{‡}
Brazil (Pro-Música Brasil)	Gold	20,000^{‡}
Brazil (Pro-Música Brasil) "10 Minute Version"	2× Platinum	80,000^{‡}
Denmark (IFPI Danmark) "10 Minute Version"	Gold	45,000^{‡}
France (SNEP) "10 Minute Version"	Gold	100,000^{‡}
Italy (FIMI)	Gold	50,000^{‡}
New Zealand (RMNZ)	3× Platinum	90,000^{‡}
Poland (ZPAV) "10 Minute Version"	Gold	25,000^{‡}
Spain (Promusicae)	Platinum	60,000^{‡}
United Kingdom (BPI)	2× Platinum	1,200,000^{‡}
^{‡} Sales+streaming figures based on certification alone.

=== Release history ===
Release dates and formats for "All Too Well (Taylor's Version)"
Region	Date	Format	Version	Label(s)	Ref.
United States	November 15, 2021	Digital download; streaming	10-minute version	Republic	
Various	November 15, 2021	Digital download	Live acoustic	Republic	
Various	November 17, 2021	Digital download; streaming	Acoustic ("Sad Girl Autumn")	Republic	
Various	June 11, 2022	Digital download; streaming	The Short Film	Republic	

== Live performances ==
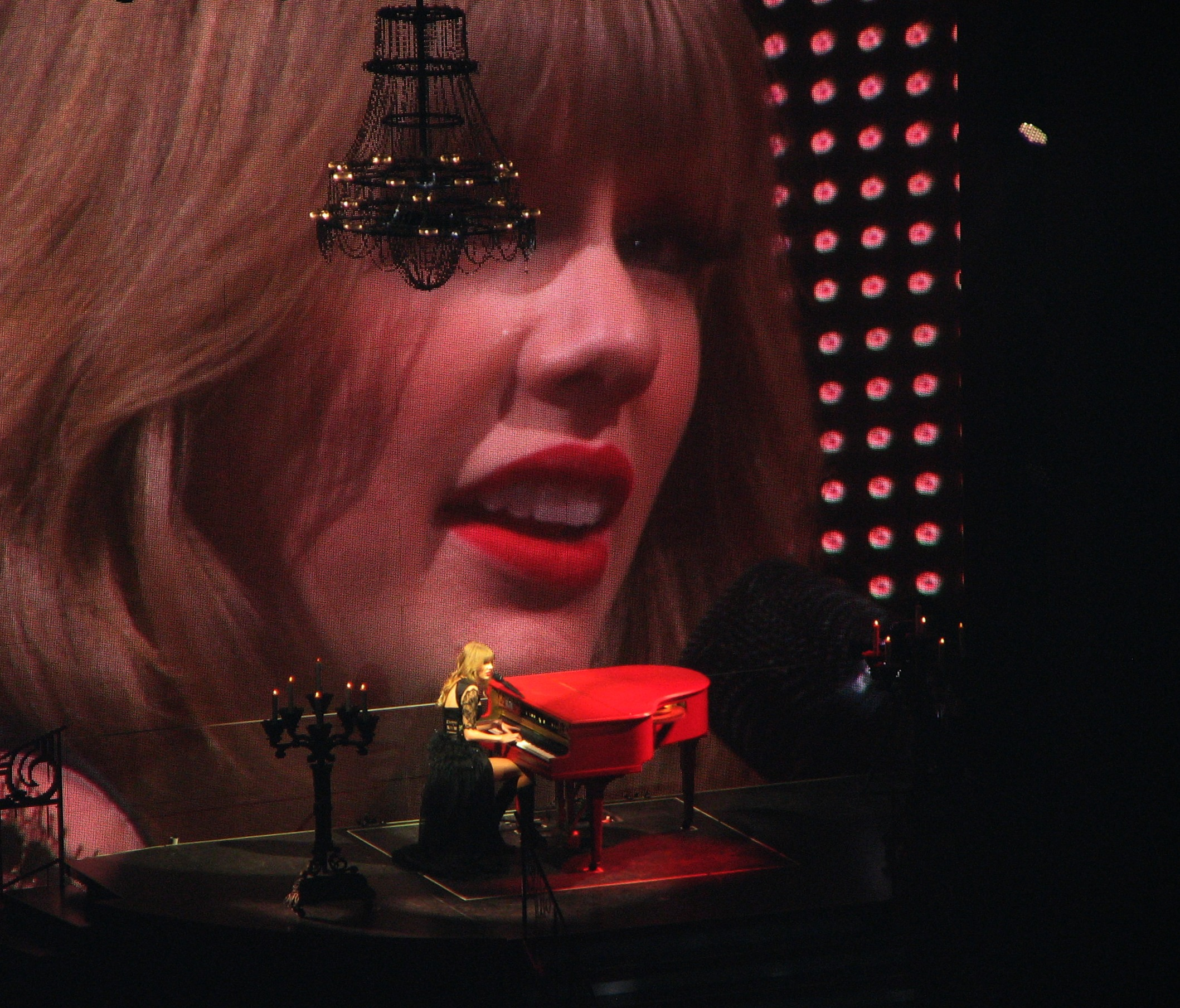
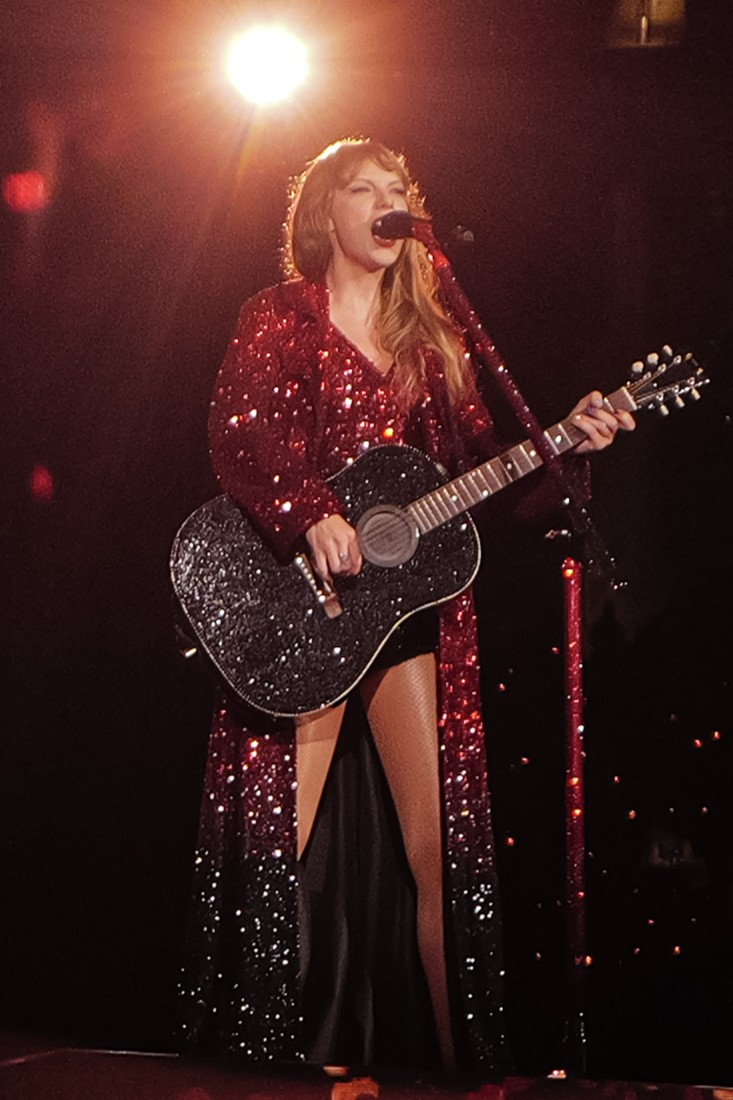
Swift performing "All Too Well" on the Red Tour in 2013 (left) and "All Too Well (10 Minute Version)" at the Eras Tour in 2023 (right)

On January 26, 2014, Swift performed "All Too Well" at the 56th Annual Grammy Awards. Wearing a dramatic beaded gown with sequin detailing and a long train streaming out behind her, she sang while playing piano on a low lit stage, before being joined by a live band midway through the performance. Her performance was praised and received a standing ovation. Swift's headbanging at the song's climax gained significant media coverage.

Swift also performed the song live throughout her Red Tour, while playing the piano. On August 21, 2015, Swift performed the song in Los Angeles at the Staples Center, the only time she did so on The 1989 World Tour. On February 4, 2017, Swift performed the song as part of the Super Saturday Night show in Houston. Swift performed an acoustic version of the song during the first show of her Reputation Stadium Tour in Glendale, Arizona on May 8, 2018, the fifth show in Pasadena, California on May 19, 2018, and the last show of the U.S. leg of the tour in Arlington, Texas on October 6, 2018, the latter of which appeared in her Netflix concert film of the same name. In 2019, she performed the song as part of her one-off City of Lover concert in Paris and at a Tiny Desk Concert for NPR Music.

She performed the 10-minute song after the screening of All Too Well: The Short Film at its film premiere, and on Saturday Night Live in a season 47 episode the following night on November 13, 2021. Hits dubbed the SNL performance "one of the most riveting musical moments of the year." She also performed it at the 2022 Nashville Songwriter Awards. The 10-minute song was on the set list of Swift's sixth headlining concert tour, the Eras Tour (2023–2024). The actors Ryan Gosling and Emily Blunt performed a parody version of the song, inspired by Barbenheimer, on a season 49 episode of Saturday Night Live in April 2024.

== Legacy ==
Often dubbed as Swift's magnum opus, "All Too Well" has been hailed by music critics, fans and journalists as the best song in Swift's discography, citing the vivid songwriting that evokes deep emotional engagement. Sheffield commented, "No other song does such a stellar job of showing off her ability to blow up a trivial little detail into a legendary heartache."

=== Listicles ===
The song featured on many publications' lists of the best songs from the 2010s decade, including Rolling Stone (5th), Uproxx (10th), Stereogum (24th), and Pitchfork (57th). It featured in unranked 2010s-decade-end lists by Time and Parade, and at number 13 on NPR's readers' poll for the best songs of the same decade. Sheffield ranked "All Too Well" first on his 2010s-decade-end list. Rolling Stone placed "All Too Well" at number 29 of its 2018 list of the 100 Greatest Songs of the Century So Far, and 69 on its list 2021 revision of the 500 Greatest Songs of All Time. In 2021, Sheffield placed the song at number one on his ranking of 206 Taylor Swift songs. In a list titled "The 25 Musical Moments That Defined the First Quarter of the 2020s", Billboard described "All Too Well (10 Minute Version)" as the "crown jewel" of Red (Taylor's Version) and one of 2021's "biggest cultural hits". In 2022, Billboard named "All Too Well (10-Minute Version)" the best breakup song of all time. Rolling Stone placed "All Too Well (10 Minute Version)" at number 33 of its 2026 list of the 200 Greatest Rock Songs of the 21st Century So Far.

=== Recognition ===
Critics often regard "All Too Well" as Swift's best song. Billboard stated "All Too Well" is the song that "proved to skeptics who might've thoughtlessly dismissed Swift as a frivolous pop star—in an era when such artists still weren't given nearly as much credit or attention by critics and older music fans as they are now—that she was in fact a truly formidable singer-songwriter." Bruce Warren, assistant general manager for programming for Philadelphia public radio station WXPN, stated that "All Too Well" foreshadowed Swift's music direction for 2020. He said "In 2014 or 2015, you wouldn't have been able to say, '[Taylor Swift] is working with Justin Vernon,' right? ['All Too Well'] foreshadowed the place she's in now... 'All Too Well' showed the potential of how great a songwriter she would be, and how she would evolve as a songwriter. And [Folklore and Evermore] took her to another level." At the 65th Annual Grammy Awards, "All Too Well (10 Minute Version)" lost Song of the Year to Bonnie Raitt's "Just Like That" (2022), garnering controversy over the fact that Swift, who is often considered as one of the foremost songwriters of the 21st-century, has never won Song of the Year despite it being the sixth nomination of her career and "All Too Well" dubbed her best work. In March 2023, Stanford University launched an academic course titled "ITALIC 99: All Too Well (Ten Week Version)"; it is "an in-depth analysis" of the song, recognizing Swift's songwriting prowess and related literature.

"All Too Well" is a fan-favorite. Over time, the song achieved a cult following within Swift's fanbase and music critics. It is one of Swift's most covered songs. Swift herself remarked this unexpected popularity during her Reputation Stadium Tour:

It's weird because I feel like this song has two lives to it in my brain. In my brain, there's the life of this song, where this song was born out of catharsis and venting and trying to get over something and trying to understand it and process it. And then there's the life where it went out into the world and you turned this song into something completely different for me. You turned this song into a collage of memories of watching you scream the words to this song, or seeing pictures that you post to me of you having written words to this song in your diary, or you showing me your wrist, and you have a tattoo of the lyrics to this song underneath your skin. And that is how you have changed the song "All Too Well" for me.

— Swift, Taylor Swift: Reputation Stadium Tour on Netflix

Upon announcement of the release of the original, 10-minute version of "All Too Well" as part of Swift's second re-recorded album, Red (Taylor's Version), the extended version became the most anticipated song from the album. The multimedia release of the album, the 10-minute song, and All Too Well: The Short Film has been described as one of the biggest pop culture moments of 2021.

=== The scarf ===
Over the years, the whereabouts of the scarf referenced in the lyrics have become a subject of media attention and speculation. Amelia Morris, an academic in media and communications, wrote that the scarf became an important part of the "Swiftian mythology", particularly the "Red mythology", that drew the obsession of Swift's fans. According to Morris, this fan debate around the scarf contributed to the release of the "(All Too Well) 10 Minute Version" and the short film, representing an evolution in the song's meaning to Swift—who had expressed how performing the song was difficult for her due to its deeply personal content, and her fans—who related to the song on their own terms.

According to media outlets, the scarf mentioned in the lyrics was originally lost at the residence of the American actress Maggie Gyllenhaal, sister of Jake Gyllenhaal. According to The Cut, it is a "very 2008 Americana chic" dark blue scarf with red and gray stripes. Business Insider confirmed Gucci as the scarf's brand and that Swift was wearing the scarf when she was taking a stroll in London with both Jake and Maggie Gyllenhaal, as seen in multiple photographs by paparazzi. Brad Nelson wrote in The Atlantic that the scarf is a Chekhov's gun whose reappearance in the final verse is thoughtful and "brutal". He explained the missing scarf quickly became a "fantastic pop culture mystery" that has created much online buzz.

When asked about the scarf in 2017 by the American host Andy Cohen on Watch What Happens Live, Maggie Gyllenhaal stated she has no idea where the scarf is, and did not understand why people asked her about it until an interviewer explained the lyrics to her. The scarf's existence or its lyrical use as just a metaphor has been a topic of debate among fans, music critics and pop culture commentators, who "agree it's more than a simple piece of outerwear." According to Sheffield, both the song and the scarf are so significant to Swift's discography that it "should be in the Rock and Roll Hall of Fame." The scarf has become a symbol in Swift's fandom, inspiring jokes, memes, and interview questions. It has even inspired numerous fan-fictions in other fandoms. Writer Kaitlyn Tiffany of The Verge described the scarf as "the green dock light of our time." Insider's Callie Ahlgrim called it a "fabled accessory" and "a source of cultural curiosity". NME critic Rhian Daly said the scarf is "an unlikely pop culture icon in an inanimate object". USA Today said the scarf "re-entered the pop culture conversation" after All Too Well: The Short Film. Kate Leaver of The Sydney Morning Herald wrote only Swift "could make a decade-old item of clothing a universal symbol for heartbreak." The Guardian named the song one of "the most debated lyric mysteries ever".

In 2021, following the release of the film and Red (Taylor's Version), the Google searches for "Taylor Swift red scarf meaning" spiked by 1,400 percent. Fans believe that the scarf is a metaphor for Swift's virginity. The scarf has been depicted as a plain red scarf in All Too Well: Short Film and the music video for her country single with Chris Stapleton "I Bet You Think About Me"; in the film, Swift is seen hanging the scarf over a banister, whereas in the latter, she gifts the scarf to a bride (Keleigh Sperry), leaving the groom (Miles Teller) confused. Replicas of this scarf—named "The All Too Well Knit Scarf"—were sold on Swift's website. In an interview at the 2022 Toronto International Film Festival, Swift described the red scarf as a metaphor, and that she made it a red-colored scarf to agree with the album's theme.

== Personnel ==
Credits are adapted from the liner notes of Red and Red (Taylor's Version).

"All Too Well" (2012)

- Taylor Swift – vocals, songwriting, production
- Liz Rose – songwriting
- Nathan Chapman – production, acoustic guitar, electric guitar, bass, keyboards, drums, backing vocals, engineering
- LeAnn "Goddess" Bennet – production coordinator
- Drew Bollman – assistant mixer
- Jason Campbell – production coordinator
- Mike "Frog" Griffith – production coordinator
- Brian David Willis – assistant engineer
- Hank Williams – mastering
- Justin Niebank – mixing

"All Too Well (Taylor's Version)" (2021)

- Taylor Swift – lead vocals, songwriter, producer
- Liz Rose – songwriter
- Christopher Rowe – producer, vocal engineer
- David Payne – recording engineer
- Dan Burns – additional engineer
- Austin Brown – assistant engineer, assistant editor
- Bryce Bordone – engineer
- Derek Garten – engineer
- Serban Ghenea – mixing
- Mike Meadows – acoustic guitar, background vocals
- Amos Heller – bass guitar, synth bass
- Matt Billingslea – drums
- Paul Sidoti – electric guitar
- David Cook – piano
- Max Bernstein – synthesizers

"All Too Well (10 Minute Version) (Taylor's Version) (From the Vault)" (2021)

- Taylor Swift – vocals, songwriter, producer
- Liz Rose – songwriter
- Jack Antonoff – producer, recording engineer, engineer, acoustic guitar, bass, electric guitar, keyboards, mellotron, slide guitar, drums, percussion
- Lauren Marquez – assistant recording engineer
- John Rooney – assistant recording engineer
- Jon Sher – assistant recording engineer
- David Hart – engineer, recording engineer: celesta, Hammond B3, piano, reed organ, baritone guitar, Wurlitzer electric piano
- Mikey Freedom Hart – engineer, celesta, Hammond B3, piano, reed organ, baritone guitar, Wurlitzer electric piano
- Sean Hutchinson – engineer, drums, percussion, recording engineer (percussion, drums)
- Jon Gautier – engineer, recording engineer (strings)
- Christopher Rowe – vocal engineer
- Laura Sisk – engineer, recording engineer
- Evan Smith – flutes, saxophone, synthesizers, recording engineer (flutes, saxophone, synthesizers)
- Bryce Bordone – engineer
- Michael Riddleberger – engineer, percussion
- John Rooney – engineer
- Serban Ghenea – mixing
- Bobby Hawk – strings
