= Arriflex 235 =

Lightweight MOS movie camera (Released 2003)

The Arriflex 235 is a lightweight 35mm MOS movie camera released in 2003 by ARRI.

== Function ==
The number reflects its position as a smaller and lighter companion camera to the Arriflex 435 and the fact that it is designed for 35 mm film.

In contrast to the Arriflex 35 IIC, it has an adjustable reflex shutter from 11.2° to 180°. This shutter can be adjusted manually with a tool through the open mount (in the same year that Arri released the Arriflex 435 Xtreme which adjusted the shutter electronically). The camera uses a 54 mm PL mount. In contrast to the Arriflex 435 it uses a single registration pin. The ground glass is identical to the 435.

The motor power ranges from 20-35V and is usually powered by an onboard battery on the AC side of the camera. The Arri 235 has an SDI video output and several power outputs for camera accessories, such as RCU, WRC, ICU or ESU.

The camera can shoot between 1 and 60 fps. The motor also has a reverse mode which runs at 25 fps.

The camera body with finder weighs 7.7 lbs (3,5 kg), which makes it one of the lightest 35mm movie cameras. Therefore, it is commonly used for handheld or Steadicam shots.

There are two types of magazines, a “dolphin” shoulder magazine, which was made in both 200 and 400-foot capacities, as well as a 400-foot vertical Steadicam magazine. It is also backwards compatible with Arriflex 35 IIC, Arriflex 35 III, and Arriflex 435 magazines, as long as each is 400 foot size or less.
