= Objetivo Fama season 4 =

Televised Puerto Rican talent show competition

Objetivo Fama
- Season 4
- Hosted by: Yuri
- Judges: Roberto Sueiro; Hilda Ramos; Fernando Allende
- Winner: Juan Vélez
- Runner-up: Iván López
- Finals venue: Centro de Bellas Artes, Guaynabo

Release
- Original network: Univision Puerto Rico
- Original release: February 17 – May 20, 2007

Season chronology
- Next → Season 5

The fourth season of the singing contest Objetivo Fama began on February 3, 2007, with a pre-show in Los Angeles, California where they announced the final 20 contestants out of 30 semi-finalists. The season officially started on February 10. The judges were Roberto Sueiro, Hilda Ramos, and Fernando Allende. The show was hosted again by Mexican singer Yuri.

== Auditions ==
Auditions were held in 23 cities among the United States and Puerto Rico in the summer and early fall of 2006.

=== Final cutdown ===
Out of each audition, a group of semi-finalists were selected. This year, the producers held a preliminary show in Los Angeles, California where they announced the official 20 contestants of the show.

The selected contestant was given a chance to perform (usually the song with which they auditioned) and then the judges will give them an overview of what they will expect of him during the show.

The ten contestants that were left out were:

The 20 selected contestants were:

#	Contestant	Home Town	Nationality	Age *
1	Aidsa Rodríguez	Orlando, Florida	(Puerto Rico) Puerto Rican	20
2	Arturo Guerrero	El Paso, Texas	(Mexico) Mexican	21
3	Edgar Pérez	San Antonio, Texas	(Mexico) Mexican	20
4	Erica Gonzaba	San Antonio, Texas	(Mexico) Mexican	21
5	Frances Marrero	New York City	(Puerto Rico) Puerto Rican	27
6	Héctor Arreguin	Chicago, Illinois	(Mexico) Mexican	21
7	Iván López	Los Angeles, California	(Mexico) Mexican	21
8	Jorge Ochoa	San Jose, California	(Mexico) Mexican	24
9	José Vargas	New York City	(Puerto Rico) Puerto Rican	28
10	Juan Vélez	Coamo, Puerto Rico	(Puerto Rico) Puerto Rican	23
11	Julissa Morel	New York City	(Dominican Republic) Dominican	18
12	Lizmarie Goldilla	Carolina, Puerto Rico	(Puerto Rico) Puerto Rican	22
13	Luz María Aguilar	Fresno, California	(Mexico) Mexican	21
14	Marissa Meza	Fresno, California	(Mexico) Mexican	18
15	Marleen Salinas	Fountain Valley, California	(Mexico) Mexican	18
16	Nat Vásquez	New York City	(Dominican Republic) Dominican	21
17	Natalia Herrera	Chatsworth, California	(El Salvador) Salvadoran	18
18	Nathalie Rodríguez	Miami, Florida	(Cuba) (Honduras) Cuban/ Honduran	22
19	Ramón García	Los Angeles, California	(Mexico) Mexican	22
20	Víctor Santiago	Villalba, Puerto Rico	(Puerto Rico) Puerto Rican	24

* Age was taken at the beginning of the contest (2007)

== Weekly Shows ==
=== Quarter-finals ===
==== First Show: February 10 ====
The songs performed during the first show were:

#	Contestant	Song title	Original performer
1	Aidsa Rodríguez	"Estaremos Juntos"	Millie Corretjer and Alvaro Torres
1	Víctor Santiago	"Estaremos Juntos"	Millie Corretjer and Alvaro Torres
2	Ramón García	"Y Yo No Se Olvidar"	Alejandro Fernández
2	Arturo Guerrero	"Y Yo No Se Olvidar"	Alejandro Fernández
3	Julissa Morel	"El Sol No Regresa"	La Quinta Estación
3	Marleen Salinas	"El Sol No Regresa"	La Quinta Estación
4	Frances Marrero	"Me Cansé De Ser La Otra"	La India
4	Nathalie Rodríguez	"Me Cansé De Ser La Otra"	La India
5	Erica Gonzaba	"¿Cómo Te Va Mi Amor?"	Pandora
5	Luz María Aguilar	"¿Cómo Te Va Mi Amor?"	Pandora
5	Lizmarie Goldilla	"¿Cómo Te Va Mi Amor?"	Pandora
6	Iván López	"Abrázame"	Camila
6	José Vargas	"Abrázame"	Camila
6	Héctor Arreguin	"Abrázame"	Camila
7	Jorge Ochoa	"La Gloria Eres Tú"	Luis Miguel
8	Juan Vélez	"Tu Amor Me Hace Bien"	Marc Anthony
9	Natalia Herrera	"Cielo Rojo"	Hermanos Zaizar
9	Edgar Pérez	"Cielo Rojo"	Hermanos Zaizar
10	Nat Vázquez	"Todos Me Miran"	Gloria Trevi
10	Marissa Mesa	"Todos Me Miran"	Gloria Trevi

The two threatened competitors of the night were: Marissa Mesa and Marleen Salinas.

==== Second Show: February 17 ====
The second show opened with a group performance headed by Mexican singer, Belinda. She performed her hit song "Ni Freud ni tu mamá" together with the contestants.

The songs performed during the second show were:

#	Contestant	Song title	Original performer
1	José Vargas	"Amores Como El Nuestro"	Jerry Rivera
1	Víctor Santiago	"Amores Como El Nuestro"	Jerry Rivera
2	Edgar Pérez	"Contra Viento y Marea"	Intocable
2	Arturo Guerrero	"Contra Viento y Marea"	Intocable
3	Marissa Mesa	"A Fuego Lento"	Rosana
3	Marleen Salinas	"A Fuego Lento"	Rosana
4	Frances Marrero	"Vengada"	Ednita Nazario
4	Aidsa Rodríguez	"Vengada"	Ednita Nazario
5	Natalia Herrera	"Dile a Ella"	Graciela Beltrán
5	Luz María Aguilar	"Dile a Ella"	Graciela Beltrán
6	Iván López	"Te Llamé"	Cristian Castro
6	Juan Vélez	"Te Llamé"	Cristian Castro
7	Ramón García	"Tu Recuerdo"	Ricky Martin
7	Lizmarie Goldilla	"Tu Recuerdo"	Ricky Martin
7	Jorge Ochoa	"Tu Recuerdo"	Ricky Martin
8	Nat Vázquez	"Acaríciame"	María Conchita Alonso
9	Erica Gonzaba	"Mi Eterno Amor Secreto"	Olga Tañon
9	Nathalie Rodríguez	"Mi Eterno Amor Secreto"	Olga Tañon
10	Héctor Arreguin	"Burbujas De Amor"	Juan Luis Guerra
10	Julissa Morel	"Burbujas De Amor"	Juan Luis Guerra

Marleen Salinas was selected by the audience to leave the competition, while Marissa Mesa got another chance to stay in the show.

The judges announced four contestants whose performances weren't good enough. This were: Jorge Ochoa, Héctor Arreguin, Julissa Morel, and Aidsa Rodríguez. However, Ochoa wasn't officially threatened in the end. Héctor was finally saved by the professors, while Julissa and Aidsa remained the two sole competitors threatened to leave the show.

==== Third Show: February 24 ====
The songs performed during the third show were:

#	Contestant	Song title	Original performer
1	Edgar Pérez	"Sigo Con Ella"	Obie Bermúdez
1	Víctor Santiago	"Sigo Con Ella"	Obie Bermúdez
2	Jorge Ochoa	"Por Mujeres Como Tú"	Pepe Aguilar
2	Arturo Guerrero	"Por Mujeres Como Tú"	Pepe Aguilar
3	Luz María Aguilar	"Ladrón"	Alicia Villarreal
3	Marissa Mesa	"Ladrón"	Alicia Villarreal
4	Frances Marrero	"Lo Siento Mi Amor"	Rocío Jurado
4	Nat Vázquez	"Lo Siento Mi Amor"	Rocío Jurado
5	Natalia Herrera	"Falsas Esperanzas"	Christina Aguilera
5	Lizmarie Goldilla	"Falsas Esperanzas"	Christina Aguilera
6	Iván López	"Contigo Aprendí"	Alejandro Fernández and Malú
6	Erica Gonzaba	"Contigo Aprendí"	Alejandro Fernández and Malú
7	Ramón García	"Sigue Sin Mí"	Marco Antonio Solís
7	Héctor Arreguin	"Sigue Sin Mí"	Marco Antonio Solís
8	José Vargas	"Tu Amor"	Luis Fonsi
9	Juan Vélez	"No Me Ames"	Marc Anthony and Jennifer Lopez
9	Nathalie Rodríguez	"No Me Ames"	Marc Anthony and Jennifer Lopez
10	Aidsa Rodríguez	"Como Duele"	Noelia
10	Julissa Morel	"Como Duele"	Noelia

Julissa Morel was selected by the audience to leave the competition, while Aidsa Rodríguez got another chance to stay in the show.

At the end of the show, the judges surprised the public when they asked five contestants: Nat Vázquez, Frances Marrero, Natalia Herrera, Juan Vélez, and José Vargas to step out front. However, they just wanted to congratulate them for their excellent performances.

They finally announced the four contestants whose performances weren't good enough. This were: Ramón García, Nathalie Rodríguez, Lizmarie Goldilla, and Marissa Mesa. However, Ramón was just warned by the judges, while Nathalie was saved by the professors. Lizmarie and Marissa where the two competitors threatened to leave the show.

The show was closed with a performance from guest group La Quinta Estación.

==== Fourth Show: March 3 ====
The fourth show opened with all the contestants performing Chayanne's hit song "Este ritmo se baila así".

The songs performed during the fourth show were:

#	Contestant	Song title	Original performer
1	Arturo Guerrero	"Te Amo"	Franco De Vita
2	Nat Vázquez	"Ultimo Adiós"	Paulina Rubio
2	Aidsa Rodríguez	"Ultimo Adiós"	Paulina Rubio
3	Erica Gonzaba	"No, no, no"	Thalía and Aventura
3	José Vargas	"No, no, no"	Thalía and Aventura
4	Iván López	"Lo Que No Fue, No Será"	José José
4	Ramón García	"Lo Que No Fue, No Será"	José José
5	Marissa Mesa	"Hoy"	Gloria Estefan
5	Lizmarie Goldilla	"Hoy"	Gloria Estefan
6	Luz María Aguilar	"Aún Hay Algo"	RBD
6	Natalia Herrera	"Aún Hay Algo"	RBD
6	Héctor Arreguin	"Aún Hay Algo"	RBD
6	Jorge Ochoa	"Aún Hay Algo"	RBD
7	Frances Marrero	"Atada"	Giselle
8	Víctor Santiago	"Cuando Acaba el Placer"	Alexandre Pires
8	Juan Vélez	"Cuando Acaba el Placer"	Alexandre Pires
9	Nathalie Rodríguez	"Somos Novios"	Armando Manzanero and Olga Tañon
9	Edgar Pérez	"Somos Novios"	Armando Manzanero and Olga Tañon

Lizmarie Goldilla was selected by the audience to leave the competition, while Marissa Mesa got another chance to stay in the show. Lizmarie was heavily criticized for his lack of discipline for not rehearsing her song with Marissa. According to the judges, this showed in her performance.

The judges called upon Aidsa Rodríguez, Ramón García and Héctor Arreguin to start improving their performances. They made clear that they did good and have the talent but have not excelled yet.

They finally announced the three threatened contestants that were: Jorge Ochoa, Arturo Guerrero, and - for the third time - Marissa Mesa. Arturo was subsequently saved by the professors. This was the last show where the professors saved any of the contestants.

==== Fifth Show: March 10 ====
The fifth show opened with all the contestants performing the hit song "Cha Cha" together with Puerto Rican singer/dancer, Chelo.

This show also featured Dominican Charytín as guest host, due to the passing of Yuri's father during the week.

The songs performed during the fifth show were:

#	Contestant	Song title	Original performer
1	Arturo Guerrero	"Me Dediqué a Perderte"	Alejandro Fernández
1	Luz María Aguilar	"Me Dediqué a Perderte"	Alejandro Fernández
2	Natalia Herrera	"Desilusionamé"	Olga Tañon
2	Aidsa Rodríguez	"Desilusionamé"	Olga Tañon
3	Ramón García	"El Pastor"	Pedro Fernández
3	Edgar Pérez	"El Pastor"	Pedro Fernández
4	Frances Marrero	"Hoja en Blanco"	Monchy y Alexandra
4	Víctor Santiago	"Hoja en Blanco"	Monchy y Alexandra
5	Nat Vázquez	"Entre Tu Cuerpo y el Mío"	Milly Quezada
5	Nathalie Rodríguez	"Entre Tu Cuerpo y el Mío"	Milly Quezada
6	Iván López	"Lloran Las Rosas"	Cristian Castro
7	Erica Gonzaba	"¿Quién Como Tú?"	Ana Gabriel
8	Marissa Mesa	"Para Amarnos Más"	Mijares
8	Jorge Ochoa	"Para Amarnos Más"	Mijares
9	Juan Vélez	"Sí La Ves"	Franco De Vita and Sin Bandera
9	Héctor Arreguin	"Sí La Ves"	Franco De Vita and Sin Bandera
9	José Vargas	"Sí La Ves"	Franco De Vita and Sin Bandera

Marissa Mesa was finally selected by the audience to leave the competition after two previous nominations, while Jorge Ochoa got another chance to stay in the show. However, he was "threatened" again to leave the competition.

Héctor Arreguin was harshly criticized by all the judges for forgetting the lyrics to his song. As a result, he was unanimously threatened to leave the competition, along with Aidsa Rodríguez and Jorge.

Univision Radio host, Carlos Alvarez, was the guest judge of the night.

==== Sixth Show: March 17 ====
The sixth show opened with all the contestants dancing together with Puerto Rican reggaeton singer, Tito El Bambino.

The songs performed during the sixth show were:

#	Contestant	Song title	Original performer
1	Víctor Santiago	"El Duelo"	La Ley and Ely Guerra
1	Natalia Herrera	"El Duelo"	La Ley and Ely Guerra
2	Juan Vélez	"Devuélveme La Vida"	Antonio Orozco
2	Erica Gonzaba	"Devuélveme La Vida"	Antonio Orozco
3	Luz María Aguilar	"La Trampa"	Ana Bárbara
4	Iván López	"Heridas De Amor"	Ricardo Montaner
4	Arturo Guerrero	"Heridas De Amor"	Ricardo Montaner
5	Nathalie Rodríguez	"Dicen Que Soy"	La India
6	Ramón García	"Todo o Nada"	Luis Miguel
7	José Vargas	"¿Qué Precio Tiene el Cielo?"	Marc Anthony
7	Frances Marrero	"¿Qué Precio Tiene el Cielo?"	Marc Anthony
8	Nat Vásquez	"En El Jardín"	Alejandro Fernández and Gloria Estefan
8	Edgar Pérez	"En El Jardín"	Alejandro Fernández and Gloria Estefan
9	Aidsa Rodríguez	"De Creer En Tí"	Jaci Velasquez
10	Héctor Arreguin	"Más Que Un Amigo"	Marco Antonio Solís
10	Jorge Ochoa	"Más Que Un Amigo"	Marco Antonio Solís

Jorge Ochoa and Héctor Arreguin were selected by the audience to leave the competition, while Aidsa Rodríguez got another chance to stay in the show. However, she was threatened again at the end of the show together with Arturo Guerrero and Edgar Pérez.

This show sparked some controversy because Edgar alleged that he was being judged by being overweight rather than his performance on stage. He went as far as to claim that the judges were manipulated by the production calling them "puppets". All of the judges argued that their comments about his weight were with good intentions, but what was unforgivable was his lack of discipline during the week refusing to comply with his exercise routines (something that all the contestants must do) and the fact that he is not performing up to his potential.

During the following week, both Edgar and the judges were interviewed by many local media and newspapers about the controversy.

==== Seventh Show: March 24 ====
The seventh show opened with all the contestants performing David Bisbal's hit song "Lloraré Las Penas".

The songs performed during the seventh show were:

#	Contestant	Song title	Original performer
1	José Vargas	"No Me Conoces"	Marc Anthony
1	Iván López	"No Me Conoces"	Marc Anthony
5	Nat Vásquez	"Sobreviviré"	Mónica Naranjo
3	Víctor Santiago	"Apiadate De Mi"	Víctor Manuelle
4	Nathalie Rodríguez	"Cuando Una Mujer"	Melina León
4	Luz María Aguilar	"Cuando Una Mujer"	Melina León
6	Natalia Herrera	"Peligro Amor"
7	Ramón García	"Cosa Mas Bella Que Tu"	Eros Ramazzotti
7	Juan Vélez	"Cosa Mas Bella Que Tu"	Eros Ramazzotti
8	Erica Gonzaba	"Tu Sin Mi"	Ednita Nazario
8	Frances Marrero	"Tu Sin Mi"	Ednita Nazario
9	Arturo Guerrero	"Mas Que Tu Amigo"	Marco Antonio Solís

Aidsa Rodríguez and Edgar Pérez were selected by the audience to leave the competition while Arturo Guerrero got another chance to stay in the competition. The threatened competitors were Ramón García, Nathalie Rodriguez and Luz Maria Aguilar.

The show also featured a guest performance from Mexican singer, Jennifer Peña.

==== Eighth Show: March 31 ====
The eight show opened with all the contestants performing their theme song "Echale Ganas".

The songs performed during the eight show were:

#	Contestant	Song title	Original performer
1	Ramón García	"Miedo"
2	Frances Marrero	"Hoy Quiero Confesarme"	Isabel Pantoja
3	Juan Vélez	"Si Yo Fuera Tú"	Servando y Florentino
4	Iván López	"Loco"	Alejandro Fernández
5	Nat Vásquez	"Contéstame"	Yaire
6	Arturo Guerrero	"Que Voy A Hacer Sin Ti"	Pablo Montero
7	Natalia Herrera	"Yo No Soy Esa Mujer"	Paulina Rubio
8	Víctor Santiago	"Fuego De Noche, Nieve De Día"	Ricky Martin
9	Erica Gonzaba	"La Soledad"	Laura Pausini
10	José Vargas	"Quien Me Iba A Decir"	David Bisbal

Luz María Aguilar and Nathalie Rodríguez were selected by the audience to leave the competition while Ramón García got another chance to stay in the competition, thus completing the group of 10 semifinalists.

The show also featured a guest performance from Mexican pop group, Reik.

=== Semi-finals ===
==== Ninth Show: April 7 ====
The ninth show kickstarted the semifinals, opening with all the contestants performing the Christian song "Jesucristo" as a motif for the Holy Week.

The songs performed during the ninth show were:

#	Contestant	Song title	Original performer
1	Erica Gonzaba	"Como Me Haces Falta"	Ana Bárbara
2	José Vargas	"Otro Día Más Sin Verte"	Jon Secada
3	Arturo Guerrero	"El Sinaloense"	Banda El Recodo
4	Frances Marrero	"Amiga Mía"	Yuri
5	Ramón García	"Secreto de Amor"	Joan Sebastian
6	Víctor Santiago	"Laura No Esta"	Nek
7	Nat Vázquez	"Ven Tú"	Domenic Marte
8	Juan Vélez	"Hasta Ayer"	Marc Anthony
9	Iván López	"Almohada"	José José
10	Natalia Herrera	"No Sirvo Para Estar Sin Tí"	Rocío Dúrcal

In the end, Natalia Herrera was selected by the audience to leave the competition. During the semifinals, each contestant is assigned a number for which the audience will vote. Each week, the contestant with the fewest votes from all the contestants is eliminated.

The show also featured a special performance from Janina, winner of the first season of Objetivo Fama.

Univision Radio host, Raúl Brindis, was the guest judge of the night.

==== Tenth Show: April 14 ====
The tenth show opened with a guest performance from Colombian singer, Fanny Lú, together with all the contestants.

The songs performed during the tenth show were:

#	Contestant	Song title	Original performer
1	Nat Vázquez	"Mentira"	Hernaldo Zúñiga
2	Juan Vélez	"Amor De Una Noche"	N'Klabe
3	Ramón García	"No"	Alejandro Fernández
4	José Vargas	"Si Volvieras a Mi"	Josh Groban
5	Erica Gonzaba	"El Aprendiz"	Alejandro Sanz
6	Frances Marrero	"El Amor"	Yolandita Monge
7	Iván López	"La Vikina"	Luis Miguel
8	Víctor Santiago	"Vuélveme a Querer"	Cristian Castro
9	Arturo Guerrero	"Donde Está La Vida"	Francisco Céspedes

In the end, Arturo Guerrero was selected by the audience to leave the competition.

Univision Radio host, Carlos Alvarez, was the guest judge of the night.

==== Eleventh Show: April 21 ====
The eleventh show opened with a performance from Marlon, winner of the third season of Objetivo Fama. The contestants danced together with the singer.

The songs performed during the tenth show were:

#	Contestant	Song title	Original performer
1	Iván López	"Desnudate Mujer"	David Bisbal
2	Erica Gonzaba	"La Cigarra"	Linda Ronstadt
3	Víctor Santiago	"Porque te Tengo Que Olvidar"	José Feliciano
4	Nat Vázquez	"Ayudame Dios Mío"	Tamara
5	Juan Vélez	"Se Supone"	Luis Fonsi
6	José Vargas	"Jamás"	Camilo Sesto
7	Frances Marrero	"Por Tí"	Ednita Nazario
8	Ramón García	"Tengo Todo Excepto a Tí"	Luis Miguel

In the end, Ramón García was selected by the audience to leave the competition.

The show also featured a guest performance from Puerto Rican reggaeton artist, Don Omar.

==== Twelfth Show: April 28 ====
The twelfth show opened with a performance from Puerto Rican reggaeton singer, Héctor el Father dancing with the contestants.

The songs performed during the twelfth show were:

#	Contestant	Song title	Original performer
1	José Vargas	"Sexo, Pudor y Lágrimas"	Aleks Syntek
2	Frances Marrero	"Entre La Noche y el Día"	Olga Tañon
3	Nat Vázquez	"Quererte a Ti"	Angela Carrasco
4	Víctor Santiago	"Maldita Suerte"	Víctor Manuelle
5	Iván López	"Todo Se Derrumbo"	Emmanuel
6	Juan Vélez	"Tu no sospechas"	Jordi
7	Erica Gonzaba	"Simplemente Amigos"	Ana Gabriel

The show also featured several guest performances after the opening. Reyli Barba performed his song "Descarada" together with contestants Víctor and José. Brazilian singer Alexandre Pires also performed a song from his latest album.

Near the end of the show, all of the contestants performed Marc Anthony's song "Así Como Hoy" with special appearances from Arquímides, Mary Ann, and Patty, finalists of the past season of the show.

A very touching moment was experienced at the end since Juan Vélez and Erica Gonzaba, who became a couple during the show, were the last two contestants to remain on stage, meaning that one of them would be eliminated. In the end, Erica was selected by the audience to leave the competition.

==== Thirteenth Show: May 5 ====
The thirteenth show opened with all the contestants performing "México" in honor of the Cinco de Mayo celebrations.

The songs performed during the fourteenth show were:

#	Contestant	Song title	Original performer
1	Juan Vélez	"Dicen Que Los Hombres"	Manny Manuel
2	Nat Vázquez	"El Poder Del Amor"	Yolandita Monge
3	Iván López	"México En La Piel"	Luis Miguel
4	Víctor Santiago	"Ves"	Sin Bandera
5	Frances Marrero	"Hacer El Amor Con Otro"	Alejandra Guzmán
6	José Vargas	"Lo Que Son Las Cosas"	Ednita Nazario

The show also featured guest performances from Colombian singer, Fonseca, and Mexican singer, Lupillo Rivera.

All of the contestants also performed duets from previous shows that are featured on the recently released CD of Objetivo Fama 4.

==== Fourteenth Show: May 12 ====
The fourteenth show opened with all the contestants performing the song "Color Esperanza" from Diego Torres. The show was hosted by Charytín.

The songs performed during the fourteenth show were:

#	Contestant	Song title	Original performer
1	Nat Vázquez	"Tu Mayor Tentación"	Yaire
1	Nat Vázquez	"Sobreviviré"	Monica Naranjo
2	Juan Vélez	"Mucho Corazón"	Luis Miguel
2	Juan Vélez	"Todo Mi Corazón"	Yuri
3	Víctor Santiago	"Nada Se Compara Contigo"	Alvaro Torres
3	Víctor Santiago	"Todo El Año"	Obie Bermúdez
4	Iván López	"Si Tu No Estás Aquí"	Rosana
4	Iván López	"Corazón estéril"	Pepe Aguilar
5	Frances Marrero	"Abrázame Fuerte"	Lourdes Robles
5	Frances Marrero	"Sin El"	Pandora

The show also featured a guest performance from Puerto Rican singer Yolandita Monge. Monge performed one song with contestant Frances Marrero, and another song from her upcoming new album.

The show also featured two guest judges: singer Jimena and Univision Radio host, Carlos González.

=== Great Finale ===
==== Fifteenth Show: May 20 ====
The great finale featured a red carpet where various celebrities marched on. All of the contestants, but one (19 in total) were present. Héctor Arreguin wasn't able to attend because he had just signed with Regional Mexican group Los Horóscopos de Durango, and had prior commitments. The four finalists arrived on the back of convertible cars and signed autographs.

The show opened with all the last 7 contestants performing the song "Pégate" from Ricky Martin.

Each of the finalists performed two songs, one of them with one of their favorite celebrities. The songs performed during the finale were:

#	Contestant	Song title	Original performer
1	Juan Vélez	"Te Sigo Amando"	Juan Gabriel
1	Juan Vélez	"Devuélveme la Vida"	with Antonio Orozco
2	Nat Vasquéz	"Luna"	Ana Gabriel
2	Nat Vasquéz	"Costumbres"	with Pablo Montero
3	Víctor Santiago	"Hasta Que Te Conocí"	Marc Anthony
3	Víctor Santiago	"Suavemente"/"La Foto Se Me Borró" (medley)	with Elvis Crespo
4	Iván López	"Yo Nací Para Amarte"	Alejandro Fernández
4	Iván López	"Buenos Amigos"	with Jimena

The show also featured the three winners from the past seasons (Janina, Anaís, and Marlon) singing "Abriendo Caminos", originally from Diego Torres and Juan Luis Guerra.

The finale closed with a guest performance from Puerto Rican reggaeton singer Daddy Yankee singing his new song "Impacto".

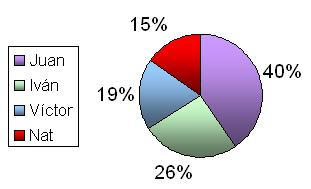
Chart of the show finalists and their vote percentage.

In the end, the finalists and winner were announced as follows:

#	Contestant	%
1	Juan Vélez	40.59
2	Iván López	25.65
3	Víctor Santiago	18.59
4	Nat Vázquez	15.17

There was a celebration outside the venue featuring R.K.M & Ken-Y.

== Controversies ==
Some controversies that surfaced during the season.

- Puerto Rican Lizmarie Goldilla was criticized by fellow contestant Marissa Mesa for not wanting to rehearse during the week. She was threatened by the judges and the next week, the audience voted her out.
- Despite favorable reviews by judges during the course of the show, Héctor Arreguin forgot the lyrics to his song on March 10. This has been a reason for an automatic threatening. The next week, the audience voted him out.
- Contestant Edgar Alberto Pérez heavily criticized the judges decision to complain about his weight arguing that this was a singing contest, and not a beauty pageant. He was very vocal about it, while the judges replied that their critics were recommendations to him as an artist and because of his health. However, upon a threatening from the judges from a poor performance, the audience then voted him out.
- Contestants Erica Gonzaba and Juan Vélez started a relationship during the show. They even performed the song "Devuélveme la Vida" from Antonio Orozco together, and closed it with a kiss garnering much applause from the audience. However, in September 2007, they announced they had ended their relationship amicably. Gonzaba even appeared in the video for Juan's song "Buscando tu Sombra".

== After the Show ==
- Season winner Juan Vélez released his first album titled Con Mi Soledad in December 2007. He has been nominated to a Billboard Music Awards. He presented four shows at the Luis A. Ferré Performing Arts Center, and then at the José Miguel Agrelot Coliseum.
- Second finalist Iván López released his first album titled La Voz in October 2007.
- Third finalist Víctor Santiago released his first album titled Desesperados in November 2007. After that, he has worked as TV host and actor.
- Frances Marrero and Erica Gonzaba are working on their first albums.
- Héctor Arreguin was the first contestant to sign with a musical group. He was a singer in the Mexican group Los Horóscopos de Durango, and then in Mazizo Musical.
