= Objetivo Fama season 5 =

Televised Puerto Rican talent show competition

Objetivo Fama
- Season 5
- Hosted by: Yuri
- Judges: Roberto Sueiro; Jimena; Fernando Allende
- Winner: Cristina Eustace
- Runner-up: Samuel Colón
- Finals venue: Centro de Bellas Artes, Guaynabo

Release
- Original network: Univision Puerto Rico
- Original release: February 9 – May 18, 2008

Season chronology
- ← Previous; Season 4 Next → Season 6

The fifth season of Objetivo Fama officially began on February 9, 2008. It was hosted by Yuri. It featured returning judges Roberto Sueiro and Fernando Allende, while Mexican singer Jimena replaced Hilda Ramos.

The season winner was Cristina Eustace.

== Auditions ==
=== Final Cutdown ===
The 20 final contestants were officially announced on February 2, 2008, during a show at the Puerto Rico Convention Center and the show officially began on February 9, 2008. A few days before, contestant Lorenzo Mendez was disqualified from the show because he was already signed to a record label. Ronny Mercedes was selected to replace him.

The 20 selected contestants were:

#	Contestant	Home Town	Nationality	Age *
1	Alfredo Lomelli	San Antonio, Texas	(Mexico) Mexican	23
2	Blanca Rosa Alfonso	Miami, Florida	(Cuba) Cuban	24
3	Cristina Eustace	Dallas, Texas	(Mexico) Mexican	28
4	Dalila Santa María	Conroe, Texas	(Mexico) Mexican	18
5	Diana Mercado	Aventura, Florida	(Dominican Republic) (Colombia) Dominican/Colombian	26
6	Javier Baerga	Caguas, Puerto Rico	(Puerto Rico) Puerto Rican	20
7	Jometh Andújar	San Juan, Puerto Rico	(Puerto Rico) Puerto Rican	27
8	Jonathan Ríos	Lares, Puerto Rico	(Puerto Rico) Puerto Rican	19
9	Josué Pérez	San Francisco, California	(Mexico) (Puerto Rico) Mexican/Puerto Rican	26
10	Karen Rodriguez	New York City	(Peru) (Dominican Republic) Peruvian/Dominican	18
11	Leonardo Méndez	Los Angeles, California	(Mexico) Mexican	24
12	Ronny Mercedes	New York City	(Dominican Republic) Dominican	22
13	Luis Javier Chávez	Hampshire, Illinois	(Mexico) Mexican	24
14	Luz Leguizamo	San Pablo, California	(Mexico) Mexican	22
15	Magdalena León	San Jose, California	(Mexico) Mexican	21
16	Sammy Genao	New York City	(Dominican Republic) Dominican	21
17	Samuel Colón	Moca, Puerto Rico	(Puerto Rico) Puerto Rican	20
18	Yaindhi Alvarez	New York City	(Dominican Republic) Dominican	25
19	Yaritza Rodríguez	Miami, Florida	(Cuba) Cuban	22
20	Yerly Burgos	Fresno, California	(Dominican Republic) Dominican	27

* Age was taken at the beginning of the contest (2008)

== Weekly Shows ==
=== Quarter-finals ===
==== First Show: February 9 ====
The songs performed during the first show were:

#	Contestant	Song title	Original performer
1	Ronny Mercedes	"Da La Vuelta"	Marc Anthony
2	Alfredo Lomelli	"Amor De Los Dos"	Vicente Fernández and Alejandro Fernández
2	Luis Javier Chavez	"Amor De Los Dos"	Vicente Fernández and Alejandro Fernández
3	Diana Mercado	"Volverte A Amar"	Alejandra Guzmán
3	Blanca Rosa Alfonso	"Volverte A Amar"	Alejandra Guzmán
4	Cristina Eustace	"Vive Ya"	Andrea Bocelli and Laura Pausini
4	Jometh Andujar	"Vive Ya"	Andrea Bocelli and Laura Pausini
5	Josue Perez	"Nuestro Amor Se Ha Vuelto Ayer"	Víctor Manuelle and Yuridia
5	Luz Leguizamo	"Nuestro Amor Se Ha Vuelto Ayer"	Víctor Manuelle and Yuridia
6	Dalila Santa Maria	"No Me Queda Mas"	Selena
6	Yaritza Rodriguez	"No Me Queda Mas"	Selena
7	Karen Rodriguez	"No Pense Enamorarme"	Gilberto Santa Rosa and Myriam Hernandez
7	Sammy Genao	"No Pense Enamorarme"	Gilberto Santa Rosa and Myriam Hernandez
8	Magdalena Leon	"Despacito"	Pedro Fernández
8	Leonardo Mendez	"Despacito"	Pedro Fernández
9	Samuel Colon	"Solo Para Ti"	Camila
9	Jonathan Rios	"Solo Para Ti"	Camila
9	Javier Baerga	"Solo Para Ti"	Camila
10	Yaindhi Alvarez	"Cosas Del Amor"	Olga Tañón and Milly Quezada
10	Yerly Burgos	"Cosas Del Amor"	Olga Tañón and Milly Quezada

- The two contestants threatened that night were Sammy and Luz
- The first show featured special presentations from Los Super Reyes and last year winner, Juan Vélez.
- The better of the night:

Cristina Eustace y Jometh Andujar with a MAGISTERIAL interpretation of the difficult topic " Vive Ya" of the big singers Andrea Bocelli and Laura Pausini definitively these two guys are a few mounsters in scene. Jometh I captivate all during the WHOLE song but the moment mas impressive was his excellent acute one " PORQUE! " This boy is one of the more strong. Cristina safely incredible in the scene and very much scenic domain.

Samuel Colon, Jonathan Rios and Javier Baerga were the best second interpretation of the night with his excellent interpretation of the song " Solo Para Ti" of the acquaintance group "Camila"

==== Second Show: February 16 ====
The songs performed during the second show were:

#	Contestant	Song title	Original performer
1	Luis Javier Chavez	"Si Pudiera Mentir"	Marco Antonio Solís
1	Javier Baerga	"Si Pudiera Mentir"	Marco Antonio Solís
2	Alfredo Lomelli	"Te Voy A Perder'	Alejandro Fernández
2	Josue Perez	"Te Voy A Perder'	Alejandro Fernández
3	Yerly Burgos	"Sueños Rotos"	La Quinta Estación
3	Diana Mercado	"Sueños Rotos"	La Quinta Estación
4	Jometh Andujar	"Mi Corazoncito"	Aventura
4	Jonathan Rios	"Mi Corazoncito"	Aventura
5	Leonardo Mendez	"Por Mujeres Como Tu"	Pepe Aguilar
6	Karen Rodriguez	"Quizas"	Milly Quezada
6	Blanca Rosa Alfonso	"Quizas"	Milly Quezada
7	Magdalena Leon	"No Puedo Dejar De Pensar En Ti"	Pandora
7	Dalila Santa Maria	"No Puedo Dejar De Pensar En Ti"	Pandora
7	Yaritza Rodriguez	"No Puedo Dejar De Pensar En Ti"	Pandora
8	Luz Leguizamo	"Pero Me Acuerdo De Ti"	Christina Aguilera
9	Sammy Genao	"Si Tu Quisieras"	Luis Fonsi
10	Samuel Colon	"Si Una Vez"	Manny Manuel
10	Ronny Mercedes	"Si Una Vez"	Manny Manuel
11	Yaindhi Alvarez	"Dejame Volver Contigo"	Dulce
11	Cristina Eustace	"Dejame Volver Contigo"	Dulce

- Luz was chosen to leave the competition
- The two contestants threatened that night were Alfredo and Dalila
- The show featured a special presentation from Ivy Queen

==== Third Show: February 23 ====
The songs performed during the third show were:

#	Contestant	Song title	Original performer
1	Ronny Mercedes	"Detenedla Ya"	Emmanuel
1	Jometh Andujar	"Detenedla Ya"	Emmanuel
2	Cristina Eustace	"Insoportablemente Bella"	Hernaldo Zúñiga
2	Karen Rodriguez	"Insoportablemente Bella"	Hernaldo Zúñiga
2	Yerly Burgos	"Insoportablemente Bella"	Hernaldo Zúñiga
3	Leonardo Mendez	"Toda La Vida"	Franco Iglesias
3	Javier Baerga	"Toda La Vida"	Franco Iglesias
4	Diana Mercado	"Costumbres"	Rocío Dúrcal and Juan Gabriel
4	Luis Javier Chavez	"Costumbres"	Rocío Dúrcal and Juan Gabriel
5	Magdalena Leon	"Inalcanzable"	RBD
5	Jonathan Rios	"Inalcanzable"	RBD
6	Samuel Colon	"No Vale La Pena"	Johnny Rivera and Ray Sepúlveda
6	Josue Perez	"No Vale La Pena"	Johnny Rivera and Ray Sepúlveda
7	Yaindhi Alvarez	"Quererte A Ti"	Angela Carrasco
7	Blanca Rosa Alfonso	"Quererte A Ti"	Angela Carrasco
8	Sammy Genao	"No Es Una Novela"	Monchy y Alexandra
8	Yaritza Rodriguez	"No Es Una Novela"	Monchy y Alexandra
9	Alfredo Lomelli	"La Pareja Ideal"	Marisela and Marco Antonio Solís
9	Dalila Santa Maria	"La Pareja Ideal"	Marisela and Marco Antonio Solís

- Jonathan & Magdalena were chosen best of the night.
- The contestants made a tribute to Mexican singer Emmanuel. He was invited as a guest judge and sang "La Chica de Humo" with the contestants.
- Alfredo was chosen to leave the competition
- The two contestants threatened that night were Luis Javier and Dalila

==== Fourth Show: March 1 ====
The songs performed during the fourth show were:

#	Contestant	Song title	Original performer
1	Samuel Colon	"Imaginame Sin Ti"	Luis Fonsi
1	Leonardo Mendez	"Imaginame Sin Ti"	Luis Fonsi
2	Yerly Burgos	"Insensible A Ti"	Alicia Villarreal
2	Magdalena Leon	"Insensible A Ti"	Alicia Villarreal
3	Ronny Mercedes	"Mi Credo"	Tiziano Ferro and Pepe Aguilar
3	Josue Perez	"Mi Credo"	Tiziano Ferro and Pepe Aguilar
4	Diana Mercado	"Me Cambio Por Ella"	Olga Tañón
4	Yaindhi Alvarez	"Me Cambio Por Ella"	Olga Tañón
5	Jonathan Rios	"La Quiero A Morir"	DLG
5	Sammy Genao	"La Quiero A Morir"	DLG
6	Karen Rodriguez	"Mujer Contra Mujer"	Mecano
6	Yaritza Rodriguez	"Mujer Contra Mujer"	Mecano
7	Dalila Santa Maria	"Callados"	Ninel Conde and Jose Manuel Figueroa
7	Luis Javier Chavez	"Callados"	Ninel Conde and Jose Manuel Figueroa
8	Cristina Eustace	"Psicofonia"	Gloria Trevi
8	Blanca Rosa Alfonso	"Psicofonia"	Gloria Trevi
9	Jometh Andujar	"Intocable"	Aleks Syntek
9	Javier Baerga	"Intocable"	Aleks Syntek

- Dalila was chosen to leave the competition
- Cristina and Blanca were threatened to leave the competition
- The show featured a special presentation from Alejandra Guzmán

==== Fifth Show: March 8 ====
The songs performed during the fifth show were:

#	Contestant	Song title	Original performer
1	Javier Baerga	"Para Darte Mi Vida"	Elvis Crespo and Milly Quezada
1	Yaritza Rodriguez	"Para Darte Mi Vida"	Elvis Crespo and Milly Quezada
2	Karen Rodriguez	"Si No Te Hubiera Conocido"	Christina Aguilera and Luis Fonsi
2	Ronny Mercedes	"Si No Te Hubiera Conocido"	Christina Aguilera and Luis Fonsi
3	Samuel Colon	"Perdidos"	Monchy y Alexandra
3	Yerly Burgos	"Perdidos"	Monchy y Alexandra
4	Josue Perez	"Nunca Voy A Olvidarte"	Cristian Castro
5	Magdalena Leon	"Acompañame"	Alicia Villarreal and Pedro Fernández
5	Sammy Genao	"Acompañame"	Alicia Villarreal and Pedro Fernández
6	Blanca Rosa Alfonso	"Escondidos"	Olga Tañón and Cristian Castro
6	Leonardo Mendez	"Escondidos"	Olga Tañón and Cristian Castro
7	Yaindhi Alvarez	"Vivir Lo Nuestro"	Marc Anthony and La India
7	Jometh Andujar	"Vivir Lo Nuestro"	Marc Anthony and La India
8	Diana Mercado	"Vivo Por Ella"	Andrea Bocelli and Marta Sanchez
8	Jonathan Rios	"Vivo Por Ella"	Andrea Bocelli and Marta Sanchez
9	Luis Javier Chavez	"En El Jardin"	Alejandro Fernández and Gloria Estefan
9	Cristina Eustace	"En El Jardin"	Alejandro Fernández and Gloria Estefan

- Blanca was chosen to leave the competition
- Javier, Ronny and Magdalena were threatened to leave the competition
- The show featured special presentations from Jenni Rivera and Yuridia

==== Sixth Show: March 15 ====
The songs performed during the sixth show were:

#	Contestant	Song title	Original performer
1	Samuel Colon	"Por Debajo De La Mesa"	Luis Miguel
1	Luis Javier Chavez	"Por Debajo De La Mesa"	Luis Miguel
2	Yaindhi Alvarez	"Ahora Que Te Vas"	La Quinta Estación
2	Yaritza Rodriguez	"Ahora Que Te Vas"	La Quinta Estación
3	Ronny Mercedes	"Mujeres Divinas"	Vicente Fernández
3	Javier Baerga	"Mujeres Divinas"	Vicente Fernández
4	Karen Rodriguez	"Tuya"	Jennifer Peña
4	Diana Mercado	"Tuya"	Jennifer Peña
5	Magdalena Leon	"No Me Enseñaste"	Thalía
6	Cristina Eustace	"Me Nace Del Corazon"	Rocío Dúrcal
6	Yerly Burgos	"Me Nace Del Corazon"	Rocío Dúrcal
7	Sammy Genao	"Coleccionista De Canciones"	Camila
7	Jometh Andujar	"Coleccionista De Canciones"	Camila
7	Leonardo Mendez	"Coleccionista De Canciones"	Camila
8	Josue Perez	"Solo Por Un Beso"	Aventura
8	Jonathan Rios	"Solo Por Un Beso"	Aventura

- Magdalena and Ronny were chosen to leave the competition
- Luis Javier, Diana and Yaindhi were threatened to leave the competition
- The show featured a special presentation from Gloria Trevi

==== Seventh Show: March 22 ====
The songs performed during the seventh show were:

#	Contestant	Song title	Original performer
1	Karen Rodriguez	"Sola Otra Vez"	Celine Dion
2	Leonardo Mendez	"Celos"	Marc Anthony
3	Josue Perez	"Por Una Mujer"	Luis Fonsi
4	Samuel Colon	"Pobre Corazon"	Divino
5	Yaritza Rodriguez	"Si Tu Eres Mi Hombre"	La India
6	Yerly Burgos	"Mi Mayor Venganza"	La India
7	Jometh Andujar	"Y Hubo Alguien"	Marc Anthony
8	Sammy Genao	"Sera"	Ricardo Montaner
9	Jonathan Rios	"Un Buen Perdedor"	Franco De Vita
10	Javier Baerga	"Volveras"	Ricky Martin
11	Cristina Eustace	"Quien Eres Tu"	Yuri
12	Yaindhi Alvarez	"Como Una Loba"	Valeria Lynch

- Diana and Luis Javier were chosen to leave the competition
- The show featured a special presentation from Shaila Dúrcal

==== Eight Show: March 29 ====
The songs performed during the eight show were:

#	Contestant	Song title	Original performer
1	Yaindhi Alvarez	"Pena"	Milly Quezada
2	Jonathan Rios	"Suelta Mi Mano"	Sin Bandera
3	Josue Perez	"Amiga Mia"	Alejandro Sanz
4	Yerly Burgos	"Tu Amor"	Olga Tañon
5	Jometh Andujar	"Yo Queria"	Cristian Castro
6	Sammy Genao	"Si Tu Supieras"	Alejandro Fernández
7	Javier Baerga	"Usted Se Me Llevo La Vida"	Alexandre Pires
8	Karen Rodriguez	"El Hombre Que Yo Amo"	Myriam Hernandez
9	Samuel Colon	"Lloraras"	Oscar D'León
10	Cristina Eustace	"Aires Del Mayab"	Lola Beltrán

- Yaritza and Leonardo were chosen to leave the competition
- The show featured a special presentation from Tito El Bambino

=== Semi-finals ===
==== Ninth Show: April 5 ====
The songs performed during the ninth show were:

#	Contestant	Song title	Original performer
1	Sammy Genao	"Ajena"	Frank Reyes
2	Cristina Eustace	"Por Ti"	Ednita Nazario
3	Karen Rodriguez	"Que Creias"	Selena
4	Jonathan Rios	"Casi Un Hechizo"	Jerry Rivera
5	Yerly Burgos	"Hasta Mañana"	Grupo Limite
6	Jometh Andujar	"Buscando Tus Besos"	Joseph Fonseca
7	Samuel Colon	"Seria Facil"	Luis Fonsi
8	Yaindhi Alvarez	"Mi Talisman"	Ana Gabriel
9	Javier Baerga	"A Puro Dolor"	Son By Four

- Josue was chosen to leave the competition
- The show featured a special presentation from Marlon, winner of the third season of the show.

==== Tenth Show: April 12 ====
The songs performed during the tenth show were:

#	Contestant	Song title	Original performer
1	Javier Baerga	"Como Pudiste"	Obie Bermúdez
2	Sammy Genao	"Lo Dudo"	José José
3	Yaindhi Alvarez	"La Tirana"	La Lupe
4	Jometh Andujar	"Me Enamora"	Juanes
5	Samuel Colon	"No Tengo Suerte En El Amor"	Yoskar Sarante
6	Cristina Eustace	"Mujeres Liberadas"	Melina León
7	Jonathan Rios	"Fuego Contra Fuego"	Ricky Martin
8	Karen Rodriguez	"Detrás de Mi Ventana"	Yuri

- Yerly was chosen to leave the competition

==== Eleventh Show: April 19 ====
The songs performed during the eleventh show were:

#	Contestant	Song title	Original performer
1	Samuel Colón	"Algo De Mi"	Camilo Sesto
2	Yaindhi Alvarez	"Viveme"	Laura Pausini
3	Jometh Andujar	"Al Que Me Siga"	Luis Miguel
4	Karen Rodriguez	"Quitame Ese Hombre"	Pilar Montenegro
5	Jonathan Rios	"Antes"	Obie Bermúdez
6	Cristina Eustace	"Mentira"	Hernaldo Zúñiga
7	Javier Baerga	"La Media Vuelta"	Luis Miguel

- Yaindhi and Milly Quezada sang together the song "Volvió Juanita"
- Sammy G was chosen to leave the competition

==== Twelfth Show: April 26 ====
The songs performed during the twelfth show were:

#	Contestant	Song title	Original performer
1	Javier Baerga	"Yo Naci Para Amarte"	Alejandro Fernández
2	Samuel Colon	"Labios Compartidos"	Mana
3	Yaindhi Alvarez	"Quiero Amanecer Con Alguien"	Daniela Romo
4	Jometh Andujar	"Devorame Otra Vez"	Lalo Rodríguez
5	Cristina Eustace	"Como Yo Te Ame"	Luis Miguel
6	Jonathan Rios	"Vuelveme A Querer"	Cristian Castro

- Jonathan, Javier and Jometh sang with MDO the songs "Otra Vez" and "No Queda Nada"
- Samuel and Karen sang with Objetivo Fama's second season 1st runner up, Azucena Salazar, the song "Terco Pero Sabroso"
- Cristina sang with Objetivo Fama's third season 4th runner up, Mary Ann Acevedo, the song "Fuera De Mi Vida"
- Yaindhi sang with Objetivo Fama's fourth season semifinalist, Frances Marrero, the song "Herida"
- Karen was chosen to leave the competition.

==== Thirteenth Show: May 3 ====
The songs performed during the thirteenth show were:

#	Contestant	Song title	Original performer
1	Jometh Andujar	"Nada Se Compara Contigo"	Alvaro Torres
2	Samuel Colon	"Como Me Haces Falta"	Marco Antonio Solís
3	Jonathan Rios	"Por Amarte"	Pepe Aguilar
4	Cristina Eustace	"Siempre Seras Tu"	Whitney Houston
5	Yaindhi Alvarez	"Cucurrucucu Paloma"	Lola Beltrán
6	Javier Baerga	"La Puerta Se Cerro"	Luis Miguel

- The show featured special presentations from Alexis & Fido and Manny Manuel
- Ex-contestants Ektor, Jayro, Gustavo and Victor sang together "Suavemente", from Elvis Crespo.
- Yuri and fifth season contestants, Cristina, Leonardo and Luis Javier sang together "Y Volver, Volver"
- Javier was chosen to leave the competition. He closed the show singing "La Puerta Se Cerro" by Luis Miguel

==== Fourteenth Show: May 10 ====
The songs performed during the fourteenth show were:

#	Contestant	Song title	Original performer
1	Jonathan Rios	"No Me Quiero Enamorar"	Kalimba
1	Jonathan Rios	"Buen Perdedor"	Franco De Vita
2	Yaindhi Alvarez	"Eclipse Total Del Amor"	Lissette
2	Yaindhi Alvarez	"Como Una Loba"	Valeria Lynch
3	Samuel Colon	"Que Lastima"	Alejandro Fernández
3	Samuel Colon	"Almohada"	José José
4	Cristina Eustace	"Me Muero"	La Quinta Estación
4	Cristina Eustace	"La Gata Bajo La Lluvia"	Rocío Dúrcal
5	Jometh Andujar	"Si Ella Supiera"	Julian

- The show started with the song "Color Esperanza", from Diego Torres, sung by the contestants with fourth season finalists, Iván, Victor and Nat.
- The show featured a special presentation from Jowell y Randy
- Jometh was chosen to leave the competition

Fue sorprendente que uno de los concursantes mas fuertes y con el paso mas firme de esta competencia se haya despedido esa noche, pues era de los que mas apoyo tenia en todas las galas y la mayor competencia de la concursante mas fuerte de esta edicion Cristina Eustace, fue impresionante para todo el mundo ver que al final de la gala 14 estaban los concursante mas duros, fuertes, versatiles y firmes de esta edicion y saber que una de ellos tendria que decir adios. Para muchos ESA escena debio haber sido la que se presentara en la final el 18 de mayo, Jometh Andujar y Cristina Eustace de la mano para saber cual de esos dos seria el TRIUNFADOR y no para que uno quedara excluido de la final. Exito a estas dos grandes estrellas!

=== Great Finale ===
==== Fifteenth Show: May 19 ====
The great finale featured a red carpet where various celebrities marched on. All of the contestants, but one (19 in total) were present. Yaritza Rodriguez wasn't able to attend because of her mother's illness. The four finalists arrived on the back of convertible cars and signed autographs.

The show opened with the 4 finalists performing the song "Baila" from Kat DeLuna.

Each of the finalists performed two songs, one of them with one of their favorite celebrities. The songs performed during the finale were:

#	Contestant	Song title	Original performer
1	Samuel Colon	"Tantos Deseos De Ella"	Danny Rivera
1	Samuel Colon	"Donde Estara Mi Primavera"	with Iván López
2	Yaindhi Alvarez	"Asi No Te Amara Jamas"	Amanda Miguel
2	Yaindhi Alvarez	"Usted Abuso"	with Marlon Fernández
3	Jonathan Rios	"Contigo Aprendi"	Alejandro Fernández
3	Jonathan Rios	"Que Sera"	with Erica Gonzaba
4	Cristina Eustace	"El Amor Que Sone"	Mariah Carey
4	Cristina Eustace	"Como Yo Nadie Te Ha Amado"	with Juan Vélez

The show also featured special presentations from reggaeton duo Wisin & Yandel and Mexican singer, Lucero.

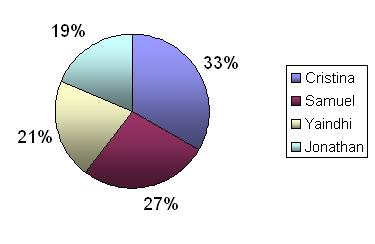
Chart of the show finalists and their vote percentage.

In the end, the finalists and winner were announced as follows:

#	Contestant	%
1	Cristina Eustace	33.37%
2	Samuel Colon	26.99%
3	Yaindhi Alvarez	20.94%
4	Jonathan Rios	18.70%

== Controversies ==
- Contestant Magdalena León was dumped by her boyfriend during the show when, allegedly, she kissed several contestants at the studio/house.
- Contestant Diana Mercado was heavily criticized by fellow contestants Luis Javier Chávez and Yaindhi Alvarez, for not performing their duets as rehearsed resulting in unfavorable evaluations to the latter.
- Some feuds between Puerto Rican contestants Jonathan Ríos and Jometh Andujar rose during the final weeks. These were due to Jonathan not waking up in time during a weekend the group had in a hotel.
- A week before the final show, Yuri, who had served as host of the show for the past three years, was surprisingly fired by the producers. Apparently, Univision wasn't happy with the fact that she wouldn't be on time for the rehearsals for the final show. She has denied this and has said that she found out about the decision through an e-mail.
- The same week, allegations of fixes in the results grew heavier when a television ad appeared on YouTube showing the four finalists, two weeks prior to their selection. The advertisement was part of a product campaign for PepsiCo and the producers of the show have denied providing them with any voting result.
