= Objetivo Fama season 6 =

Televised Puerto Rican talent show competition

Objetivo Fama
- Season 6
- Hosted by: Gisselle
- Judges: Roberto Sueiro; Hilda Ramos; Abraham
- Winner: Fabián Torres
- Runner-up: José Rubén Ruíz
- Finals venue: Centro de Bellas Artes, Guaynabo

Release
- Original network: Univision Puerto Rico
- Original release: February 14 – May 17, 2009

Season chronology
- ← Previous; Season 5

The sixth season of Objetivo Fama ran from February to May 2009. The season featured a panel of judges that included returning judges Roberto Sueiro and Hilda Ramos, along with newcomer judge, singer Abraham. He replaced Fernando Allende. At that time, it was the final season, being dubbed as Objetivo Fama: La Despedida. It was hosted by Puerto Rican singer Gisselle.

In 2019, producer Soraya Sanchez announced that a new season of the show would be produced for 2020 to mainly feature Urbano music, Reggaeton and Trap.

== Auditions ==
Auditions were held in several towns and cities of Puerto Rico.

=== Final Cutdown ===
Out of each audition, a group of 16 contestants were selected. Like the first season, this featured only Puerto Rican contestants.

The 16 selected contestants were:

#	Contestant	Home Town	Age *
1	Amesis Roman	Vega Baja, Puerto Rico	20
2	Andrés Rios	Comerío, Puerto Rico	18
3	Fabián Torres	Orocovis, Puerto Rico	19
4	Hannaní Peraza	Arecibo, Puerto Rico	19
5	Hecmarie Diaz	Luquillo, Puerto Rico	19
6	Jorge Nieves	Aguas Buenas, Puerto Rico	20
7	José Aníbal Maldonado	Villalba, Puerto Rico	18
8	José Rubén Ruiz	Río Grande, Puerto Rico	24
9	Judith Olivencia	Caguas, Puerto Rico	26
10	Leidy D. Gabriel	Luquillo, Puerto Rico	23
11	Marko Castillo	Ponce, Puerto Rico	19
12	Saúl Diaz	Cayey, Puerto Rico	26
13	Tania Tirado	Ponce, Puerto Rico	25
14	Urayoán Lizardi	San Juan, Puerto Rico	20
15	Víctor Robles	Cataño, Puerto Rico	18
16	Zugeil Velez	Hormigueros, Puerto Rico	26

* Age was taken at the beginning of the contest (2009)

== Weekly Shows ==
=== Quarter-finals ===
==== First Show: February 7 ====
The songs performed during the first show were:

#	Contestant	Song title	Original performer
1	Marko Castillo	"Un Beso"	Aventura
2	Hannani Peraza	"Dudas"	Amanda Miguel
3	Jose Anibal Maldonado	"Fabricando Fantasias"	Tito Nieves
4	Leidy D. Gabriel	"Oye"	Beyoncé
5	Andres Rios	"Yo Que Te Ame"	Ricardo Montaner
6	Victor Robles	"Yo Te Extranare"	Tercer Cielo
7	Saul Diaz	"No Se Tu"	Luis Miguel
8	Amesis Roman	"Entre Tu Cuerpo y El Mio"	Milly Quezada
9	Tania Tirado	"No Te Quiero Mas"	Marta Sanchez
10	Jose Ruben Ruiz	"Y Hubo Alguien"	Marc Anthony
11	Zugeil Velez	"El Frio De Tu Adios"	Olga Tañón
12	Urayoan Lizardi	"Desnudate Mujer"	David Bisbal
13	Judith Olivencia	"Angel"	Yuridia
14	Jorge Nieves	"Sabes"	Reik
15	Hecmarie Diaz	"El Hombre Que Yo Amo"	Myriam Hernandez
16	Fabian Torres	"Te Conozco Bien"	Marc Anthony

- The two contestants threatened that night were Jose Anibal and Jorge
- The show featured a special presentation from host Giselle, Circo, Limi-T 21 and Angel & Khriz.
- Judith was praised as the best of the night, because of her strong vocals and magnificent stage presence.
- Hannani was commented on her strong vocals.
- Tannia and Victor were commented on doing a good job also

==== Second Show: February 14 ====
The songs performed during the second show were:

#	Contestant	Song title	Original performer
1	Zugeil Velez	"Amarte"	Abraham & Bethliza
1	Victor Robles	"Amarte"	Abraham & Bethliza
2	Jose Ruben Ruiz	"Tarde o Temprano"	Tommy Torres
2	Fabian Torres	"Tarde o Temprano"	Tommy Torres
3	Andres Rios	"Lo Quiero a Morir"	Gisselle & Sergio Vargas
3	Leidy D. Gabriel	"Lo Quiero a Morir"	Gisselle & Sergio Vargas
4	Amesis Roman	"Imparable"	Tommy Torres & Jesse & Joy
4	Urayoan Lizardi	"Imparable"	Tommy Torres & Jesse & Joy
5	Marko Castillo	"Te Regalo Amores"	R.K.M & Ken-Y
5	Jorge Nieves	"Te Regalo Amores"	R.K.M & Ken-Y
6	Hannani Peraza	"No"	Ednita Nazario & Natalia Jimenez
6	Judith Olivencia	"No"	Ednita Nazario & Natalia Jimenez
7	Hecmarie Diaz	"Fantasias"	Monchy & Alexandra
7	Jose Anibal Maldonado	"Fantasias"	Monchy & Alexandra
8	Tania Tirado	"Quiero Vivir La Vida Amandote"	Ana Gabriel & Marc Anthony
8	Saul Diaz	"Quiero Vivir La Vida Amandote"	Ana Gabriel & Marc Anthony

- Jorge was chosen to leave the competition
- The two contestants threatened that night were Leidy D. and Andres
- The show featured a special presentation from Miguelito.
- Jose Ruben and Fabian were praised as the best of the night.

==== Third Show: February 21 ====
The songs performed during the third show were:

#	Contestant	Song title	Original performer
1	Judith Olivencia	"Yo Se Que Volveras"	Lunna & Glenn Monroig
1	Andres Rios	"Yo Se Que Volveras"	Lunna & Glenn Monroig
2	Hecmarie Diaz	"Que Hiciste"	Jennifer Lopez
3	Amesis Roman	"Perdicion"	La Quinta Estación
3	Hannani Peraza	"Perdicion"	La Quinta Estación
4	Fabian Torres	"Se Me Olvido"	Manny Manuel
5	Urayoan Lizardi	"Amor De Una Noche"	N'Klabe
5	Jose Ruben Ruiz	"Amor De Una Noche"	N'Klabe
6	Jose Anibal Maldonado	"Aqui Estoy Yo"	Luis Fonsi, David Bisbal, Aleks Syntek & Noel Schajris
6	Marko Castillo	"Aqui Estoy Yo"	Luis Fonsi, David Bisbal, Aleks Syntek & Noel Schajris
6	Saul Diaz	"Aqui Estoy Yo"	Luis Fonsi, David Bisbal, Aleks Syntek & Noel Schajris
7	Leidy D. Gabriel	"Cinco Minutos"	Gloria Trevi
7	Zugeil Velez	"Cinco Minutos"	Gloria Trevi
8	Tania Tirado	"Sin Miedo a Nada"	Alex Ubago & Amaia Montero
8	Victor Robles	"Sin Miedo a Nada"	Alex Ubago & Amaia Montero

- Leidy D. was chosen to leave the competition
- The two contestants threatened that night were Jose Anibal and Andres. Jose Anibal was threatened as a punishment for violating the rules on the studio-house.
- The show featured a special presentation from Arcángel.
- Jose Anibal, Marko and Saul were praised as the best of the night.

==== Fourth Show: February 28 ====
The songs performed during the fourth show were:

#	Contestant	Song title	Original performer
1	Urayoan Lizardi	"Y, Si Fuera Ella?"	Alejandro Sanz
2	Tania Tirado	"Es Mentiroso"	Olga Tañón
2	Zugeil Velez	"Es Mentiroso"	Olga Tañón
3	Victor Robles	"Celos"	Marc Anthony
3	Andres Rios	"Celos"	Marc Anthony
4	Hannani Peraza	"Costumbres"	La India
5	Jose Anibal Maldonado	"Pueden Decir"	Gilberto Santa Rosa
5	Fabian Torres	"Pueden Decir"	Gilberto Santa Rosa
6	Jose Ruben Ruiz	"Nada Es Para Siempre"	Luis Fonsi
6	Marko Castillo	"Nada Es Para Siempre"	Luis Fonsi
7	Judith Olivencia	"Hasta El Fin"	Monchy y Alexandra
7	Saul Diaz	"Hasta El Fin"	Monchy y Alexandra
8	Hecmarie Diaz	"No Te Quiero Nada"	Ha*Ash
8	Amesis Roman	"No Te Quiero Nada"	Ha*Ash

- Andres was chosen to leave the competition.
- The three contestants threatened that night were Tania, Victor and Hecmarie.
- The show featured a special presentation from La Secta Allstar.
- Jose Anibal, Fabian and Hannani were praised as the best of the night. Urayoan was also praised.

==== Fifth Show: March 7 ====
The songs performed during the fifth show were:

#	Contestant	Song title	Original performer
1	Jose Ruben Ruiz	"Tesoro Mio"	Guillermo Dávila & Kiara
1	Amesis Roman	"Tesoro Mio"	Guillermo Dávila & Kiara
2	Fabian Torres	"Yo Si Me Enamore"	Huey Dunbar
2	Marko Castillo	"Yo Si Me Enamore"	Huey Dunbar
3	Zugeil Velez	"La Frase Tonta De La Semana"	La Quinta Estación & Alex Ubago
3	Jose Anibal Maldonado	"La Frase Tonta De La Semana"	La Quinta Estación & Alex Ubago
4	Victor Robles	"En Un Solo Dia"	Negros
5	Tania Tirado	"En Cambio No"	Laura Pausini
6	Hecmarie Diaz	"Todo Me Habla De Ti"	Lourdes Robles
6	Hannani Peraza	"Todo Me Habla De Ti"	Lourdes Robles
7	Saul Diaz	"Todo Cambio"	Camila
7	Urayoan Lizardi	"Todo Cambio"	Camila
8	Judith Olivencia	"Falsas Esperanzas"	Christina Aguilera

- Tania was chosen to leave the competition.
- The three contestants threatened that night were Amesis, Saul and Urayoan.
- The show featured a special presentation from R.K.M & Ken-Y & MJ.
- Jose Ruben and Victor were the best of the night.

==== Sixth Show: March 14 ====
The songs performed during the sixth show were:

#	Contestant	Song title	Original performer
1	Fabian Torres	"Escapemonos"	Marc Anthony & Jennifer Lopez
1	Hannani Peraza	"Escapemonos"	Marc Anthony & Jennifer Lopez
2	Judith Olivencia	"Ahora Entendi"	Yuridia
2	Amesis Roman	"Ahora Entendi"	Yuridia
3	Marko Castillo	"Ese"	Jerry Rivera
4	Victor Robles	"Que Me Alcance La Vida"	Sin Bandera
4	Jose Ruben Ruiz	"Que Me Alcance La Vida"	Sin Bandera
5	Hecmarie Diaz	"Llegaste Tu"	Jesse & Joy
5	Zugeil Velez	"Llegaste Tu"	Jesse & Joy
6	Saul Diaz	"Mi Media Mitad"	Rey Ruiz
7	Urayoan Lizardi	"Tanto La Queria"	Andy y Lucas
7	Jose Anibal Maldonado	"Tanto La Queria"	Andy y Lucas

- Saul was chosen to leave the competition.
- The three contestants threatened that night were Marko, Zugeil and Hecmarie.
- The show featured a special presentation from Fanny Lú, who also served as judge. Jerry Rivera performed with Fabian his song Vuela Alto.
- Fabian and Hannani were praised as the best of the night. Jose Anibal, Urayoan and Victor were also praised.

=== Semi-finals ===
==== Seventh Show: March 21 ====
The songs performed during the seventh show were:

#	Contestant	Song title	Original performer
1	Victor Robles	"Un Siglo Sin Ti"	Chayanne
2	Jose Anibal Maldonado	"No Se Olvidar"	Alejandro Fernández
3	Amesis Roman	"Que Sera De Ti"	Melina León
4	Hecmarie Diaz	"Quitame Ese Hombre"	Yolandita Monge
5	Urayoan Lizardi	"De Mi Enamorate"	Tito Nieves
6	Judith Olivencia	"Regresa A Mi"	Yuridia
7	Marko Castillo	"Inocente Pobre Amigo"	Juan Gabriel
8	Fabian Torres	"Angel"	Jon Secada
9	Hannani Peraza	"Amor Perdido"	Marta Sanchez
10	Jose Ruben Ruiz	"Lagrimas"	Aventura

- Zugeil was chosen to leave the competition.
- The show featured a special presentation from Yolandita Monge. Franco El Gorila and Jayco opened the show with the contestants.
- Fabian and Marko were praised as the best of the night. Jose Ruben was also praised.

==== Eight Show: March 28 ====
The songs performed during the eight show were:

#	Contestant	Song title	Original performer
1	Amesis Roman	"Peligroso Amor"	Myriam Hernandez
2	Jose Ruben Ruiz	"Bella"	Ricky Martin
3	Marko Castillo	"No Me Doy Por Vencido"	Luis Fonsi
4	Judith Olivencia	"Asi Fue"	Isabel Pantoja
5	Jose Anibal Maldonado	"Historia De Un Amor"	Luis Miguel
6	Hecmarie Diaz	"Yo Por El"	Yuridia
7	Hannani Peraza	"Señor Amante"	Valeria Lynch
8	Victor Robles	"Yo No Se Perdonarte"	Víctor Manuelle
9	Fabian Torres	"Vida"	Marcos Llunas

- Urayoan was chosen to leave the competition.
- The show featured a special presentation from Amaia Montero. Elvis Crespo opened the show.
- Hannani was praised as the best of the night. Amesis was also praised.

==== Ninth Show: April 4 ====
The songs performed during the ninth show were:

#	Contestant	Song title	Original performer
1	Victor Robles	"Te Amo"	Franco De Vita
2	Jose Anibal Maldonado	"Lluvia"	Eddie Santiago
3	Amesis Roman	"Ya Te Olvide"	Rocío Dúrcal
4	Marko Castillo	"Todo Se Derrumbo Dentro De Mi"	Emmanuel
5	Fabian Torres	"Boricua en la Luna"	Fiel a la Vega
6	Hecmarie Diaz	"No Te Olvidare"	Gloria Estefan
7	Jose Ruben Ruiz	"La Incondicional"	Luis Miguel
8	Hannani Peraza	"Tu Sin Mi"	Ednita Nazario

- Judith was chosen to leave the competition.
- The show featured a special presentation from La Quinta Estación.
- Hannani and Fabian were praised as the best of the night. Victor and José Rubén were also praised.

==== Tenth Show: April 11 ====
The songs performed during the tenth show were:

#	Contestant	Song title	Original performer
1	Marko Castillo	"El Privilegio De Amar"	Mijares & Lucero
2	Hecmarie Diaz	"No Me Queda Mas"	Selena
3	Hannani Peraza	"Un Viaje Largo"	Marcela Gandara
4	Fabian Torres	"Tu No Le Amas, Le Temes"	Luis Enrique
5	José Aníbal Maldonado	"Besame"	Ricardo Montaner
6	Victor Robles	"Todo Se Lo Debo A El"	Divino & Marcos Yaroide
7	José Rubén Ruiz	"Se Esfuma Tu Amor"	Marc Anthony

- Amesis was chosen to leave the competition.
- The show featured a special presentation from Tercer Cielo. The show was opened by gospel singer and judge Abraham and his wife Bethliza.
- Jose Ruben was praised as the best of the night. Fabian was also praised.

==== Eleventh Show: April 18 ====
The songs performed during the eleventh show were:

#	Contestant	Song title	Original performer
1	Jose Ruben Ruiz	"Esta Ausencia"	David Bisbal
2	Hannani Peraza	"No Habra Nada"	Whitney Houston
3	Jose Anibal Maldonado	"Volverte a Ver"	Aleks Syntek
4	Victor Robles	"Tu Amor"	Luis Fonsi
5	Fabian Torres	"Entregate"	Luis Miguel
6	Marko Castillo	"Flor Sin Retoño"	Charlie Zaa

- Hecmarie was chosen to leave the competition.
- The show featured a special presentation from Yomo & Pablo Montero, who sang with Hannani his song Hay Otra En Tu Lugar. The show was opened by Gilberto Santa Rosa and Víctor Manuelle.
- Jose Ruben & Hannani were praised as the best of the night.

==== Twelfth Show: April 26 ====
The songs performed during the eleventh show were:

#	Contestant	Song title	Original performer
1	Fabian Torres	"Por Mujeres Como Tu"	Tito Rojas
2	Jose Anibal Maldonado	"Ven Tu"	Domenic Marte
3	Hannani Peraza	"Abrazame Fuerte"	Lourdes Robles
4	Jose Ruben Ruiz	"El Gran Varon"	Willie Colón
5	Marko Castillo	"Escuchame"	Joseph Fonseca

- Victor was chosen to leave the competition.
- The show featured a special presentation from Alexis & Fido and Alex Ubago. The show was opened by Melina León.
- Jose Ruben, Hannani and Fabian were praised as the best of the night.

==== Thirteen Show: May 2 ====
The songs performed during the eleventh show were:

#	Contestant	Song title	Original performer
1	Jose Anibal Maldonado	"Si Tu Supieras"	Alejandro Fernández
2	Jose Ruben Ruiz	"Pegadito"	Tommy Torres
3	Fabian Torres	"No Hace Falta"	Cristian Castro
4	Hannani Peraza	"Entre La Noche y El Día"	Olga Tañón

- Marko was chosen to leave the competition.
- The show was opened by Tito El Bambino. Jose Ruben sang with Season 4 contestant, Ivan Lopez, his José José's cover "Si Me Dejas Ahora". Marko sang with Season 5 contestant, Jonathan Rios, Kalimba's hit "No Me Quiero Enamorar". Hannani sang with Season 3 contestant, Mary Ann Acevedo, her song "Mírame". Fabian sang with Season 4 contestant, Victor Santiago, his new single "No Es Cierto". Jose Anibal sang with Season 1 contestant, Sheila Romero, her new single "Créelo"
- According to the judges all the performances failed to impress them and the public

==== Fourteenth Show: May 9 ====
The songs performed during the eleventh show were:

#	Contestant	Song title	Original performer
1	Fabian Torres	"Si Te Vas"	Marc Anthony
1	Fabian Torres	"Angel"	Jon Secada
2	Hannani Peraza	"Amame Una Vez Mas"	Amanda Miguel
2	Hannani Peraza	"No Habra Nada"	Whitney Houston
3	Jose Ruben Ruiz	"Me Va A Extrañar"	Ricardo Montaner
3	Jose Ruben Ruiz	"Esta Ausencia"	David Bisbal

- Jose Anibal was chosen to leave the competition
- The show featured a special presentation from Chenoa. She also served as the extra judge for the night
