= Mi Sueño (Marlon album) =

Studio album by Marlon
- Released: October 24, 2006
- Recorded: 2006
- Genre: Latin pop, Salsa
- Label: La Calle Records
- Producer: Sergio George

Marlon chronology
Mi Sueño (2006)	Homenaje a Juan Luis Guerra (2008)

Singles from Mi Sueño
- 1. "Usted Abuso"; 2. "A Quien"; 3. "Tracionera"

Mi Sueño is the debut album from Cuban singer Marlon. Marlon was the winner of the third season of Puerto Rican talent show contest Objetivo Fama.

The album was released in the U.S. on October 24, 2006. The album features two songs written by Marlon himself, plus two songs from famous singer, Olga Tañon.

The first single, "Usted Abusó", is a cover version of Celia Cruz and Willie Colón's song and a duet with La India.

== Track listings ==
1. "Intro – Guaguancó"
2. "Usted Abusó"
3. "Por Amor" (Pop version)
4. "Tracionera"
5. "¿A Quién?"
6. "Amanecer Sin Tí"
7. "No Basta"
8. "Te Llevare a La Locura"
9. "Toma Mi Mano"
10. "Créeme"
11. "Eres Tú"
12. "Usted Abusó" (Pop version)
13. "Por Amor"
14. "Eres Tú" (Pop version)
