= Cristina Eustace =

Mexican singer

- Born: Cristina Yasmin Rascón Meléndez; May 25, 1979 (age 46)
- Origin: Mexico
- Genres: Regional Mexicano, Pop
- Occupation: Singer
- Website: cristinae.com

Cristina Eustace (born as Cristina Yasmin Rascón Meléndez on May 25, 1979, in the city of Chihuahua) is a Mexican singer. She was also the winner of the fifth season of Objetivo Fama. This show was a Puerto Rican television singing talent contest in the form of a reality show, broadcast by Telefutura in the United States and by Univision Puerto Rico.

== Biography ==
=== Early years ===
Cristina Eustace was born in Chihuahua, Mexico on May 25 to Carlos Rascón and Cristina Meléndez. From a young age, she showed interest on the arts. At the age of 14, Cristina sang with De la Garza Group that performed songs spanning various musical genres including traditional Mexican, Norteño, and American Pop & Rock. She also performed musicals with Taller de Arte in Chihuahua, where she was the narrator for Joseph and the Amazing Technicolor Dreamcoat.

While attending high school in Mexico City, she performed in the Valores Bacardi y Compania nationwide singing contest where she was chosen as a finalist among thousands of contestants and was offered a scholarship to Conceptos, a singing academy run by Televisa, the largest Spanish-speaking media company. During this period, she performed in well-known theaters in Mexico City including Teatro Libanes where she performed in various musicals including Evita, the long running Hercules, and, again, Joseph and the Amazing Technicolor Dreamcoat.

At 18, she gained significant exposure from her work with Conceptos and was chosen by Jose Antonio Gonzáles to perform with Son de Mexico, a classical Mexican group sponsored by Mexicana Airlines. With Son de Mexico, she traveled throughout Mexico, South America, and the United States performing for Mexican embassies, political events, national festivals, and concerts. The group consistently appeared on national television broadcasts in Mexico including Al Fin de Semana, Pacatelas, and El Espacio de Tatiana. Cristina was also featured on national radio broadcasts including Al Son de Mexico. The group recorded two albums, including "Si Tu Me Dices Ven".

Cristina has performed as an opening act for groups in Mexico and the United States including Kumbia Kings, Aida Cuevas, Los Huracanes de Norte. She also earned a scholarship to the University of Texas at El Paso in 2000 and was on the Dean's List for excellent academic performance throughout her tenure there ultimately earning a bachelor's degree in marketing.

Prior to winning Objetivo Fama 5, Cristina played in Dallas with the following bands: The Heat, Los big sexy, and Alebrije.

=== Personal life ===
Cristina was married to Scott Eustace . She has a son by the name of Andres Esteban Loaiza with Esteban Loaiza, a Mexican retired professional baseball pitcher.

== Music career ==
=== Objetivo Fama ===
In 2007, Cristina auditioned for Objetivo Fama in Miami, Florida. She was chosen and traveled to Puerto Rico to compete in the show which began in February 2008. During the show, she always surprised with her performances receiving favorable critics from the judges and the audience all throughout.

On May 18, 2008, she was announced as the winner of the show, which will grant her a contract with Univision Music Group. Despite many people agreeing that she was one of the most talented contestants, her victory was questioned because of recent irregularities and controversies that surfaced about the credibility of the show.

On May 20, 2008, two days after winning the show, she offered her first private concert where she shared stage with some of her fellow contestants.

== Vive El Sueño ==
On August 31, 2009, she participated in a show presented by Univision National TV where she was named the best singer in the competition, she won 2nd place.

=== De los Pies hasta la Frente and Jamás Te Dejaré ===
After closing the chapter on the powers of song, the Mexican Cristina started to promote her album for the Mexican public "De los Pies hasta la Frente," Regional Mexican music, this album shows her romantic side, as a strong woman.

The disc contains only six songs, with the purpose of being "accessible" to the public, but the March 23, 2010, at Puerto Rico, she released a new album (EP) to her US and Puerto Rican public, in addition to these songs, including pop ballad versions. Although her followers knew playing different genres, Cristina tried to nurture this album with the music she grew up also includes a domestic violence song.

Cristina admitted her participation in "Viva el Sueño" was only to be released throughout the United States and "refresh" the memory of the people that she is a new artist.

== Discografía ==
Álbumes de estudio

- 2009: De los Pies hasta la Frente
- 2011: Golpes de Pecho

EPs

- 2010: Jamás Te Dejaré
- 2018: Las Mujeres No Se Dejan FT.
- 2021: Esa No Soy Yo
- 2022: Cuando Me Extrañes
- 2022: Infiel
- 2023: Cuando Me Extrañas
- 2023: La Noche de Mi Mal en Vivo con Mimoso.
- 2023: Guadalupe ft. J1
- 2023: Es Navidad

Preceded by Juan Vélez	Objetivo Fama; Winner; Season 5 (2008)	Succeeded by Fabián Torres
