= Con Mi Soledad =

Studio album by Juan Vélez
- Released: December 11, 2007
- Recorded: 2007
- Genre: Latin pop
- Length: 36:22
- Label: Univision Records
- Producer: Sergio George

Con Mi Soledad is the debut album from the winner of the fourth season of Objetivo Fama, Juan Vélez. The album was released on December 11, 2007. In its first week, the album opened at number eight on the Billboard Top Latin Albums chart. The album was nominated at the 2008 Latin Billboard Awards.

== Reception ==
AllMusic noted in its review of the album, "And while the material on this disc is not earth shattering, Con Mi Soledad is still a pleasant and competent debut from this Puerto Rican pop singer."

== Track listing ==
1. Con Mi Soledad
2. Buscando Tu Sombra
3. Como Decirte Adiós
4. Abandonados
5. Todo Sigue Igual
6. Yo Te Quiero
7. Devuélveme La Vida
8. Una Segunda Vez
9. Tal Vez
10. Así Es Mi Vida

== Chart performance ==
| Chart (2007) | Peak |
|---|---|
| U.S. Latin Pop Albums | 5 |
| U.S. Top Latin Albums | 8 |

=== Singles ===
All regularly released singles from the album and their peak positions on the Billboard Hot Latin Tracks (HLT) and Latin Pop Airplay (LPA) charts.

| Year | Single | Peak positions | |
| Year | Single | HLT | LPA |
|---|---|---|---|
| 2007 | "Con Mi Soledad" | 22 | 11 |
