= Homenaje a Juan Luis Guerra =

Studio album by Marlon
- Released: January 29, 2008
- Genre: Salsa
- Length: 41:24
- Label: La Calle Records

Marlon chronology
Mi Sueño (2006)	Homenaje a Juan Luis Guerra (2008)	Estoy De Pie (2009)

Homenaje a Juan Luis Guerra is the second studio album from Cuban singer Marlon. The album is a tribute to Dominican merengue singer Juan Luis Guerra, and features salsa cover of some of his songs.

The album was released in the U.S. on January 29, 2008. The first single released was "La Bilirrubina". The second and more successful single released was "Bachata Rosa".

== Track listings ==
No.	Title	Length
1.	"La Bilirrubina"	4:15
2.	"Bachata Rosa"	3:37
3.	"Si Tú Te Vas"	4:26
4.	"A Pedir Su Mano"	4:15
5.	"Frio, Frio"	4:38
6.	"Visa Para Un Sueño"	3:53
7.	"Ojalá Que Llueva Café"	3:40
8.	"Estrellitas Y Duendes"	4:39
9.	"Burbujas De Amor"	4:21
10.	"Woman Del Callao"	3:40
Total length:		41:24
