= Víctor Santiago =

- Born: Víctor Antonio Santiago Negrón; February 5, 1983 (age 42)
- Origin: Villalba, Puerto Rico
- Genres: Rock; Pop
- Occupation: singer
- Instrument: vocals
- Years active: 2007-present

Víctor Antonio Santiago Negrón, known as Víctor (born February 5, 1983, in Villalba, Puerto Rico) is a Puerto Rican singer, host, and actor. He is known for being one of the finalists of the fourth season of reality/talent show Objetivo Fama.

== Career ==
Víctor grew up in Villalba, Puerto Rico. Early in his career, he sang choirs for Las Nenas del Swing. Later, he was a member of merengue groups Mambo and Karís.

In 2007, he was selected to be a contestant in the fourth season of Objetivo Fama, a Puerto Rican reality/talent show. Víctor was a consistent competitor and ended up in third place in the competition. During his stay in the show, Víctor performed the following songs:

Objetivo Fama season 4 performances
Show	Song	Original artist
February 10	"Estaremos Juntos" (with Aidsa Rodríguez)	Millie Corretjer and Alvaro Torres
February 17	"Amores como el Nuestro" (with José Vargas)	Jerry Rivera
February 24	"Sigo con Ella" (with Edgar Pérez)	Obie Bermúdez
March 3	"Cuando Acaba el Placer" (with Juan Vélez)	Alexandre Pires
March 10	"Hoja en Blanco" (with Frances Marrero)	Monchy y Alexandra
March 17	"El Duelo" (with Natalia Herrera)	La Ley and Ely Guerra
March 24	"Apiadate de Mí"	Víctor Manuelle
March 31	"Fuego de Noche, Nieve de Día"	Ricky Martin
April 7	"Laura No Esta"	Nek
April 14	"Vuélveme a Querer"	Cristian Castro
April 21	"Porque te Tengo que Olvidar"	José Feliciano
April 28	"Maldita Suerte"	Víctor Manuelle
May 5	"Ves"	Sin Bandera
May 12	"Nada se Compara Contigo"	Alvaro Torres
May 12	"Todo el Año"	Obie Bermúdez
May 20	"Hasta que te Conocí"	Marc Anthony
May 20	"Suavemente"/"La Foto Se Me Borró" (medley)	with Elvis Crespo

After Objetivo Fama, Víctor began working on his first album which was released on November 20, 2007, under the title Desesperados. The album spawned a hit single titled "Salvajemente Enamorada". In 2009, he released his second album titled La Medida del Amor. In July 2013, Víctor headlined a show dedicated to boleros held at the National Foundation of Popular Culture at Old San Juan.

Aside of his music career, Víctor has been acting in theater and plays. He also co-hosted, along with Jose Figueroa, the TV show ASF (first called Adrenalina Sin Frenos) which aired on Univision Puerto Rico.

== Personal life ==
Victor married Yizette Cifredo in a private ceremony on November 24, 2012. Their first daughter, Eva Santiago Cifredo, was born in April 2014.

== Discography ==
Year	Album information
2007	Desesperados: Release date: November 20, 2007; 1st studio album; Singles: 2007 "Salvajemente Enamorada"
2009	La Medida del Amor: Release date: April 28, 2009; 2nd studio album; Singles: 2009
