= N'Klabe =

Puerto Rican salsa group

- Origin: Puerto Rico
- Genre: Salsa
- Years active: 2003–present
- Members: Félix Javier "Felo" Torres; Jose Ruben "JR" Ruiz; Urayoan Lizardi

N'Klabe is a Puerto Rican salsa group formed in 2003.

== History ==
N'Klabe was formed in 2003 by Félix Javier "Felo" Torres. They have released several albums, including their debut album, Salsa Contra Viento y Marea, in 2004 and recently released their new single on March 6, 2021 "Se Parece A Ella".

Through their career, N'Klabe has collaborated with salsa singers like Gilberto Santa Rosa, Víctor Manuelle, Cheo Feliciano, Ismael Miranda, Luisito Carrión, Brenda K. Starr, and Rey Ruiz, among others. They've also collaborated with reggaeton artists like Julio Voltio, R.K.M & Ken-Y, and Jowell & Randy.

In 2008, N'Klabe began an international promotional tour, organizing presentations in Peru, Colombia and the United States. In Lima, they performed before a crowd 35,000. In 2008, they played in Switzerland. They've also participated at the Salsa National Day in Puerto Rico, and were part of the concert from the Fania All-Stars.

In their album La Nueva Escuela, the group pays tribute to salsa veterans like Lalo Rodríguez, Jerry Rivera, Luis Enrique, Eddie Santiago, and others.

Somewhere between 2008 and 2009, Ricky and Héctor left the group due to creative differences. Management also paid Felo significantly more Ricky and Hector. Ricky went on to record music as a solo artist under the name Ricky Luis .February 2009, Anthon Ibañez joined Felo. They then decided to choose their third member from the finalists of the sixth season of the show Objetivo Fama. Eventually, they chose José Rubén Ruíz as their third member, and started to work on their next album.

After some time, Anthon left the group and was replaced with Roberto Karlo Figueroa.

In November 2011, N'Klabe released the album Aires de Navidad through NuLife Entertainment and Sony Music Latin. The album debuted in the Top 5 of the iTunes Top Latin Album list, along with Romeo Santos, Pitbull, Jenni Rivera, and Vicente Fernández. The title song also peaked at No. 1 in the Billboard's Latin Tropical Airplay. This was the group's third song to reach that spot, after "Amor de una Noche" and "I Love Salsa". It is also one of the few Holiday songs to peak at No. 1 on Billboard, and the only group of salsa to do it in recent years.

N'Klabe reached No. 1 with their single, "La Banda" on Billboard's Latin Tropical airplay in May 2012. The song is the lead single from their new CD/DVD La Salsa Vive set for release June 26.

== Members ==
- Félix Javier "Felo" Torres (b. 5 November 1979)
- Jose Ruben "JR" Ruiz
- Urayoan Lizardi

== Discography ==
- Salsa Contra Viento y Marea (2004)
- I Love Salsa (2005)
- A Punto de Estallar (2006)
- La Nueva Escuela 'Nu School' (2007)
- "La Salsa Vive (2012)
- Aires de Navidad (2012)
- Se Parece a Ella (2021)
