= Mazizo Musical =

- Origin: Chicago, Illinois
- Genres: Duranguense
- Labels: Univision Music Group (2004–2007); Fonovisa Records

Mazizo Musical is a regional Mexican band formed in Chicago in 2003. They specialize in the duranguense genre. In 2006, they released a single called "Loco Por Ti" by the Mexican singer Marco Antonio Solís which was on their album, Nuestros Sueños.

Their first concert was in Durango, their home town, with 30,000 people in attendance. Their latest album, Sin Mirar Atras was released in summer 2008.

== Band members ==
- Ricardo Obregón
- Raúl Obregón
- Diego Obregón
- Giovanni Guerrero
- Abel Mena

== Discography ==
- 2004 Quiero Ser

1. Sabes Bien

2. Con La Misma Espina

3. La Menonita

4. Serán Sus Ojos

5. Quiero Ser

6. Copa Vacía

7. Abrazado De Un Poste

8. El Hijo Desobediente

9. Caray

10. Polka Maziza

11. Un Ángel No Debe Llorar

12. Cuánto Vales

- 2005 Si Te Quedaras

1. Si Te Quedaras

2. Me Muero Sin Ti

3. Si Supieras

4. Aunque Te Enamores

5. Polka Maziza #2

6. La Caspa Del Diablo

7. Pídeme La Luna

8. Polka Los Vientos

9. Como Le Haré

10. La Primera Caricia

- 2006 Nuestros Sueños

1. No Me Digas Que Ya Te Vas

2. Loco Por Ti

3. Pequeña Orgullosa

4. Dos Enamorados

5. Fue Mentira

6. Morena Morenaza

7. Llueve Sobre Mojado

8. Polkeando Con Las Momias

9. Perdedor

10. Florita Del Alma

11. Mis Sueños

- 2007 Por Encima De Todo

1. Platicando A Solas

2. Acepta Mi Error

3. Hasta Mañana

4. Lagrimas

5. Chiquita Bonita

6. La Polka Cocha

7. Otro Llega Del Pasado

8. Y Yo Que Te Amo

9. Entre Perico Y Perico

10. Quiero Ser

- 2008 Sin Mirar Atras

1. Necesito

2. Queda Tan Poco De Ti

3. Yo Sin Tu Amor

4. Mirando Las Estrellas

5. No Puedo Callarlo Más

6. Como La Primera Vez

7. La Mujer Más Especial

8. Donde Estas

9. El Cabron

10. No Volverás

11. Si Es Secreto

12. Por Encima De Todo

- 2009 Por el Resto de Tu Vida

1. Más De Mi Vida

2. Como Cuento De Hadas

3. Que Si Eres Tu

4. Pierdo La Razón

5. Niña Preciosa

6. Tu

7. Para Recordar

8. Hoy

9. Se Acero Mi Plebada

10. La Mujer Que Soñé

11. Para Que Seas Feliz

- 2010 Corridos De Alto Calibre

1. El Vaquero Robles

2. El Perron Merino

3. La Coyotera

4. Juventino Quintero

5. Traficantes Michoacanos

6. Los Tres Gallos

7. Corrido Del Güero

8. El Limpia Vidrios

9. Pégale Al Polvo

10. Ezequiel Rodríguez

• 2020 Contagiados...A La Musica

1. No Llorare
2. Se Olvido
3. Que Lástima
4. El Mismo Dolor
5. Durango Durango
6. Polka Sylvia
7. Corrido del Año Nuevo
8. Estoy Enamorado
9. Zapateado Mazizo
10. Si Pudiera
11. Las Mañanitas

•2022 Sin Límites

1. Nadie Va A Pensar En Ti Mejor Que Yo

2. Mi Fantasía

3. Llamadas Perdidas

4. Zapateado Mazizo #2

5. Tu

6. Perfecta

7. Descansando

8. Pepas

Compilations

- Linea De Oro: Loco Por Ti Y Muchos Exitos Mas...
- Pura Dinamita Duranguense
- Epoca Dorada

Singles

2008 Queda Tan Poco De Ti

2009 Que Si Eres Tu

2010 El Vaquero Robles Banda Versión

2015 Y Esperare

2016 Está Vez

2017 Si Pudiera

2018 Zapateado Mazizo

2019 Se Olvido

2019 El Mismo Dolor

2022 Nadie Va Pensar En Ti Mejor Que Yo

2022 Pepas

2022 Zapateado Mazizo #2

2022 Tu

== Mazizo All-Starz ==
2012 • Hasta El Fin De Mundo
