= Objetivo Fama =

Televised Puerto Rican talent show competition

- Title card for the revival featuring past winners and the logo for new broadcaster Telemundo Puerto Rico
- Directed by: Marcelo Gama
- Country of origin: Puerto Rico
- Original language: Spanish
- No. of seasons: 7

Production
- Executive producers: Soraya Sanchez & Ender Vega
- Production location: Puerto Rico
- Running time: 2 hours

Original release
- Network: Univision Puerto Rico (WLII) / Telefutura (All the USA)
- Release: January 31, 2004 – May 17, 2009
- Network: Telemundo Puerto Rico (Puerto Rico); Estrella TV (United States)
- Release: July 19, 2025 – present

Objetivo Fama (sometimes abbreviated as OF, Spanish for Target: Fame) is a Puerto Rican singing talent contest that aired for over six years on WLII, the Univision outlet in Puerto Rico; and on Telefutura in the mainland United States from 2004-2009. Currently the show airs on Telemundo Puerto Rico and in Estrella TV in the mainland United States. It is produced by Soraya Sánchez's SoraSan Productions.

== History ==
The program was loosely inspired by the late Puerto Rican singing talent contest and variety show, Voces en Función, and the Spanish reality show, Operación Triunfo. Twenty or so contestants are "bunkered" in a studio/house where they will live together for several months while participating in a weekly show where one of them is eliminated, en route to find a "young star". The winner of the show gets a record deal from Univision Music Group. The show aired for six years, starting in 2004, and finishing in 2009.

Contestants were evaluated by a panel of judges, and viewers had the opportunity to vote on who they wanted to stay or leave the competition. Also, during the week they were assisted by singing and dancing teachers, stylists, costume designers, personal trainers, etc. in the studio/house to help them shape and improve their talent and image. The show was often said to be the Spanish version of American Idol, although technically speaking, the official Spanish version of that show is Latin American Idol.

On February 9, 2025, it was announced that Objetivo Fama would return for a seventh season later that same year. In March it was confirmed that Objetivo Fama would also be switching networks with the new season set to air on Telemundo Puerto Rico starting in August. The show will also broadcast outside of Puerto Rico through Estrella TV. Auditions for Objetivo Fama began in Puerto Rico on May 3rd and will also take place in Miami, Florida, New York City, and Los Angeles in June. According to the station's press release Objetivo Fama will air the happenings from inside the house on Wednesdays and live performance episodes will be taking place on Saturdays from the Centro de Bellas Artes de Caguas.

== Judges and hosts ==
=== Judges ===
Judges	Seasons						
Judges	1	2	3	4	5	6	7
Roberto Sueiro	Main	Main	Main	Main	Main	Main	Main
Hilda Ramos			Main	Main		Main	
Lissy Estrella		Main					
Fernando Allende			Main	Main	Main		
Jimena					Main		
Abraham Velásquez						Main	
Cristina Eustace							Main
Ana Isabelle							Main

- Roberto Sueiro (2004–2009, 2025-present) is a Puerto Rican artist and entertainment attorney. As a teenager, he sang with several rock bands and wrote songs while studying in the University of Florida. He finished law studies at the Interamerican University of Puerto Rico. He continued studies in intellectual property and music rights at New York University where he received a master's degree in law, in 1992. He then released four albums under the pseudonym of Byron. He reached the Billboard lists and won several awards. He also delved into producing and was one of the conceptual creators of Son By Four. He is currently practicing law in the field of entertainment and intellectual property, where he has represented several renowned artists. He is the only judge featured during all seasons of Objetivo Fama.
- Hilda Ramos (2004-2007, 2009) is a Puerto Rican soprano that has become one of the most sought opera singers in the world since her debut in 1989 with the Puerto Rican Symphonic Orchestra. In 1993, she won the first prize at the Metropolitan Opera Auditions in Puerto Rico and was one of the finalists of the regional auditions in New Orleans. She has performed around the world in places like Israel, Rome, Geneva, and the United States among others. She has performed at numerous world-known operas to much acclaim. In 2002, she debuted in New York City, invited by Regina Resnik. In 2004 and 2005 she collaborated as a teacher in Objetivo Fama, and in 2006 debuted as one of the judges. She remained as part of the judge panel until 2008, where she declined to dedicate time to her singing career. Ramos returned in 2009, to be judge of the last edition of OF.
- Fernando Allende (2006–2008) is a Mexican singer, actor, producer and director. He has acted in several soap operas in Spain, Mexico, and Latin America. Allende has traveled the world and lived in London for several years. In 2001 he moved to Puerto Rico where Allende has retaken his career as an actor and director. Allende also studied law at the Universidad La Salle in Mexico. He performs regularly as a mariachi and continues producing local films. In 2006 he was selected not only as one of the three judges but also as the president of the jury.
- Lissy Estrella (2005) is a Puerto Rican singer. She served as a judge only for the second season.
- Jimena (2008) is a Mexican singer. She is serving as a judge on the fifth season.
- Abraham Velásquez (2009) is a Puerto Rican Christian inspirational singer. He served as a judge in substitution of Fernando Allende who resigned to work as a TV producer and film director.
- Cristina Eustace (2025-present) is a Mexican singer who competed and won the fifth season of Objetivo Fama.
- Ana Isabelle (2025-present) is a Puerto Rican singer, actress, dancer and entrepreneur.
- Guest judges are sometimes brought in. Some of the most common are singer/host Charytín, and some radio hosts from Univision Radio. It has been confirmed that guest judges will rotate every week during the show's seventh season.
Objetivo Fama hosts

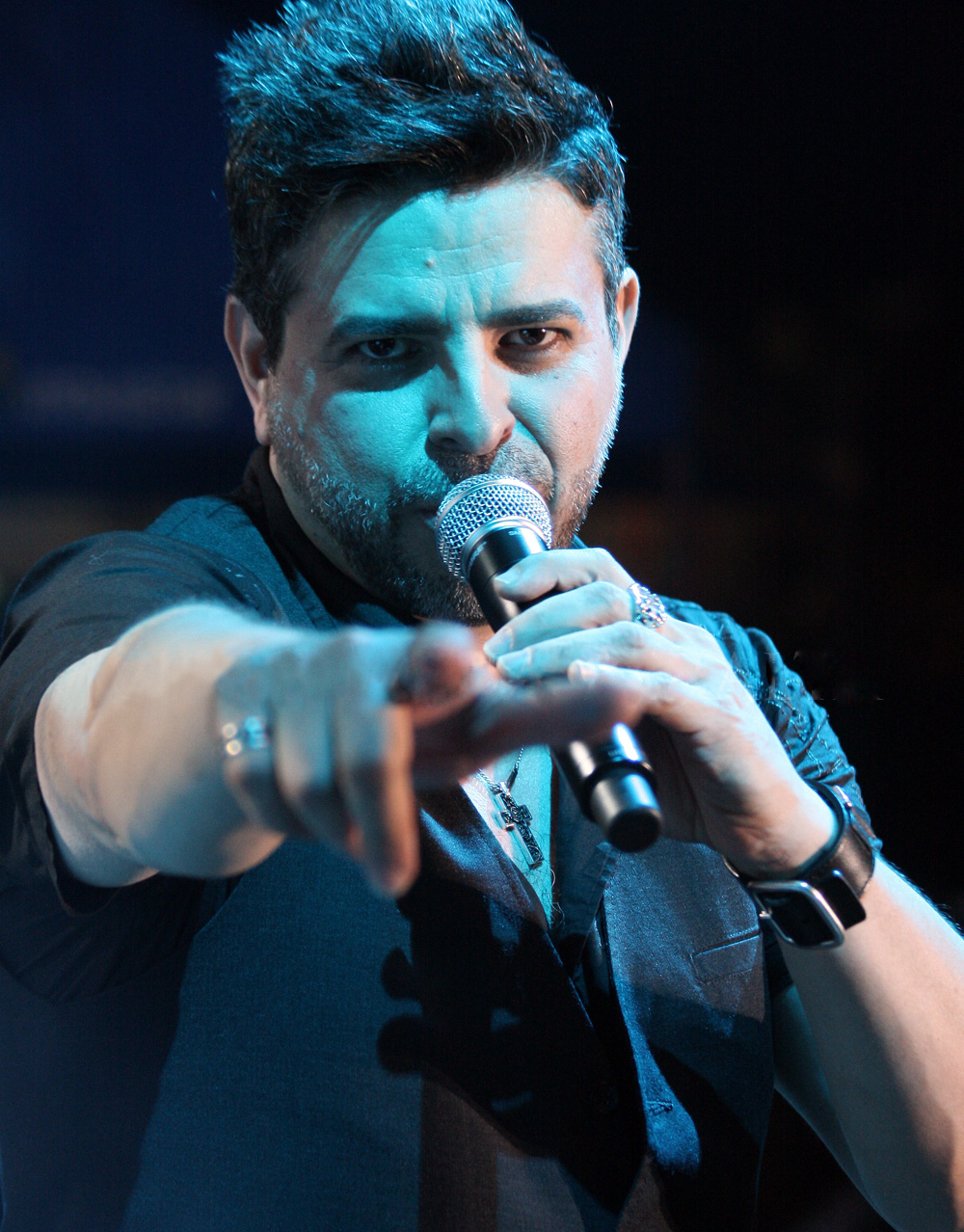
Luis Enrique (2004)

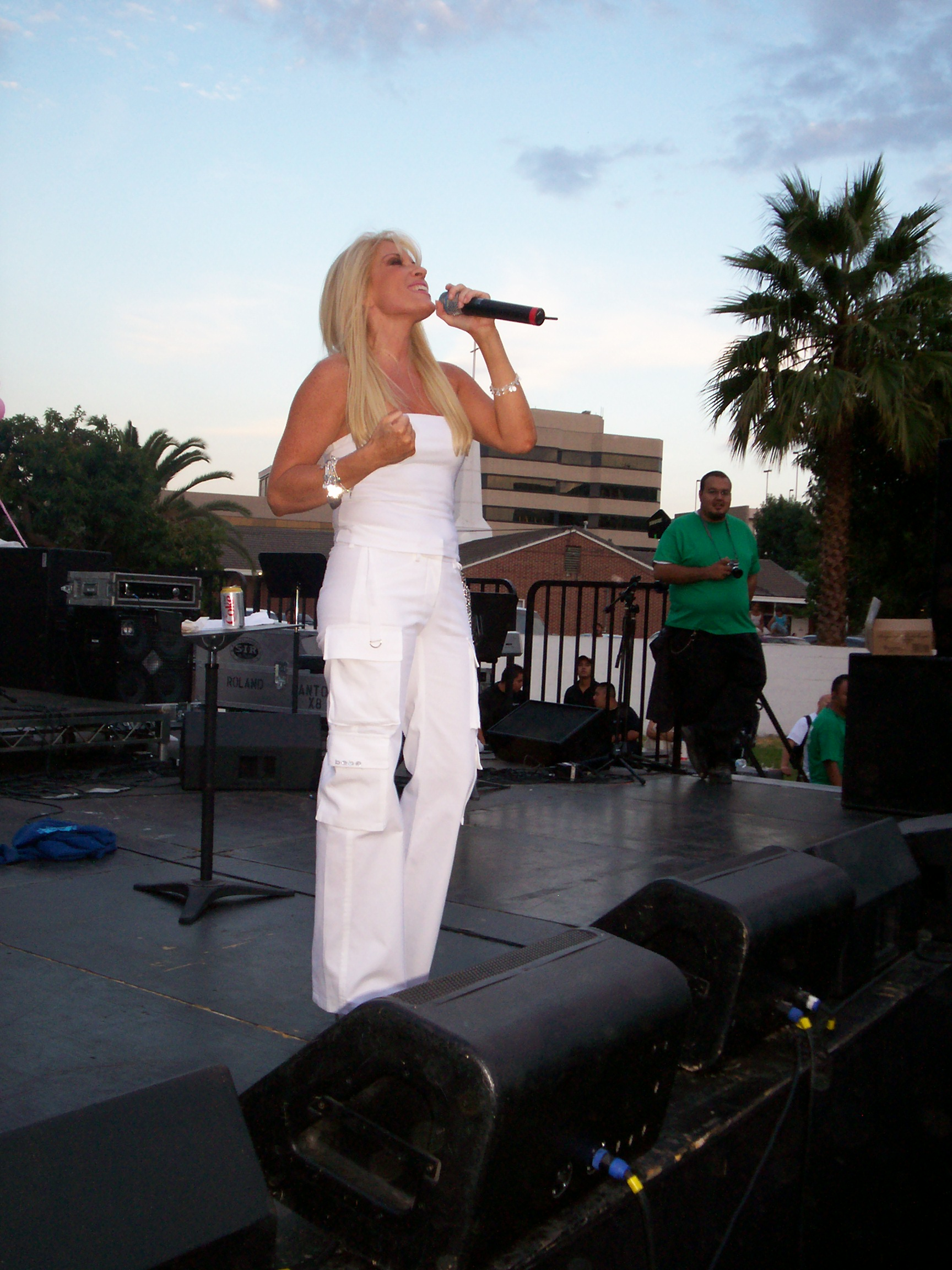
Yuri (2006–2008)

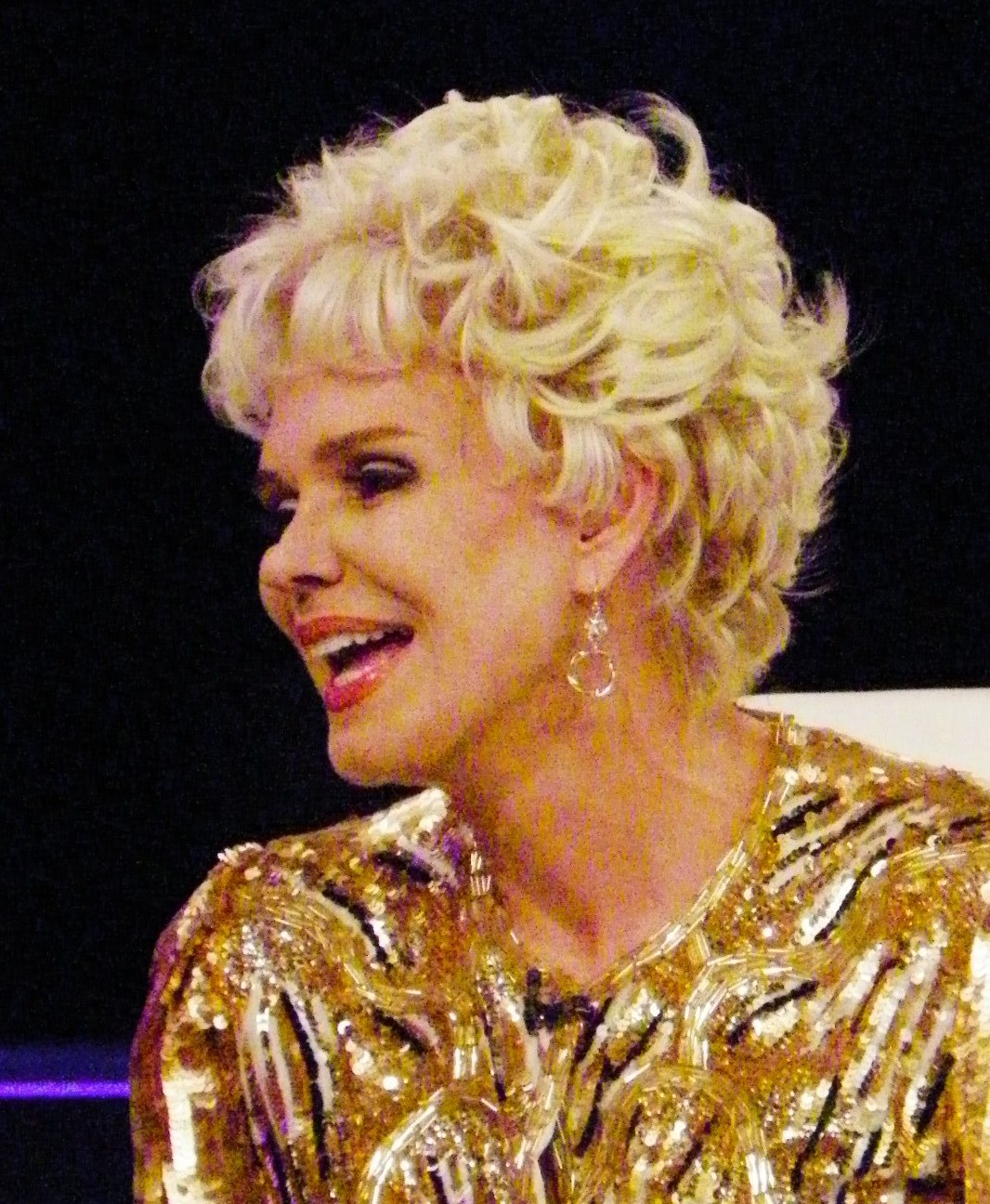
Charytín Goyco (2008)

=== Hosts ===
The first season of Objetivo Fama was hosted by Nicaraguan singer Luis Enrique, while the second one was co-hosted by Mexican actor/singer Víctor Noriega and Puerto Rican model/host Yizette Cifredo.

For the third season, Mexican singer Yuri was chosen as host, and she quickly became a favorite of the audience. She remained with the show until the end of the fourth season, when she was fired. She was replaced by entertainer Charytín Goyco during the season finale. Goyco had already served as guest host and judge during several episodes of the show.

The sixth was hosted by Puerto Rican singer and host Gisselle.

For the seventh season of the show, Jimena Gallego and Gil Marie López have been announced as hosts. Gallego was a judge on the 5th season of the show and López is one of the host of daytime talk show Dia a Dia which also airs on Telemundo Puerto Rico. Meanwhile, Victor Santiago will be hosting "Objetivo Fama: Sin Editar" (Objetivo Fama: Unedited) a weekly show which will recap everything that happens in the house where the contestants will be living on during the competition. Former Miss Universe Denise Quiñones will also serve as director of said house.

== Auditions ==
Before the show season starts, auditions are held at several places in Puerto Rico and the United States to pick the finalists that will be featured in the show. These are evaluated by the show's producers which included music directors Gabriel Ferri and Angelo Torres. When the 20 contestants are selected, they are moved to Puerto Rico where the studio/house is located. For its last season, the producers reduced the number of contestants from 20 to 16. Also, like the first season, all contestants were from Puerto Rico.

=== Studio/House ===
The studio/house were the contestants live during the course of the show was located in the San Juan Metropolitan Area. It was administered, directed and managed by Puerto Rican singer, Lunna.

== Weekly Shows ==
During the first two years, the weekly show was held at the Teatro del Parque in Santurce, its third year in Caguas Performing Arts Center in the city of Caguas, Puerto Rico. However, the fourth season moved to the Guaynabo Performing Arts Center in the city of Guaynabo, Puerto Rico. The show usually starts with a big performance involving all the contestants in one song-and-dance number. Then, each contestant performs the song they had received and rehearsed during the week. Performances can vary from duos, trios, to single performances. Between participations, each contestant is interviewed and clips of the weeks' happenings are shown.

After each presentation, each contestant is evaluated by the three judges. At the end of the show, the judges announce which contestants are "threatened" to leave the studio/house. Viewers then have one week to call and "save" their favorite contestant. The show closes with a performance by a guest artist.

=== Acceso Total ===
Literally translated as Total Access, this section follows every weekly show with interviews with contestants and judges. This special show began during the third season (2006) following the weekly show. It is hosted by José Figueroa and Liza Lugo.

=== Sin Editar ===
Loosely translated as Unedited, this is another weekly show where they follow the contestants lives at the studio/house and their rehearsals during the week. It also includes interviews and questions from the audience. In 2007, it was hosted by Daniela Droz. In the fifth season (2008), the show also included evaluations of each contestant past presentation from a former judge, Hilda Ramos, and was hosted by Yizette Cifredo. For the show's upcoming seventh season Victor Santiago and Gabriela Short will be hosting Sin Editar

== Season synopses ==
Objetivo Fama
Objetivo Fama Finalists (with dates of elimination)
Season 1 (2004)
Janina Irizarry	Winner; April 24
Sheila Romero	2nd Place
Ektor Rivera	3rd Place
Daniel Rodríguez	4th Place
Juan "Tony" Cordero	April 17
Héctor Gotay	April 17
Luis Montes	April 17
Lizzette Medina	April 10
Natalia Acosta	Disqualified; March 31
Zania Sala	March 27
Yaddeliz Martínez	March 20
Elliot Suro	March 13
Dominic Padilla	March 6
Charlie Rodríguez	February 28
Janayra Reyes	February 21
Alex Soto	February 14
Jencelamary Rivera	February 7
Encarnita "Kany" García	Disqualified; January 31
Season 2 (2005)
Anaís Martínez	Winner; May 1
Azucena Salazar	2nd Place
Jayro Rosado	3rd Place
Rodolfo Castera	4th Place
Esteban Nuñez	April 23
Carmen Rivera	April 23
Rosangela Abreu Crespo	April 16
Tairon Aguilera	April 9
Natalie Amaya	April 3
Carlos Rubén Salazar	Disqualified; March 30
Emilio Acevedo	March 26
Carlos Alberto Aldana	March 26
Wenceslao Navarro	March 19
Karol De Jesús	March 19
Verónica Zavala	March 12
Marland Rodríguez	March 5
Luis Angel López	February 26
Priscila Salisbury	February 19
Angélica Pacheco	February 12
Darla Delgado	February 5
Season 3 (2006)
Marlon Fernández	Winner; May 14
Patricia "Patty" Contreras	2nd Place
Arquímides González	3rd Place
Mary Ann Acevedo	4th Place
Jenilca Giusti	May 6
José Barraza	May 6
Helen Ochoa	April 29
Patricia Mercado	April 29
Edwin Gómez	April 22
Brigitte Dávila	April 22
Sunel Molina	April 15
Ronald Martínez	April 15
Francisco Salicrup	April 8
Ediberto Carmenatty	Disqualified; March 31
Soledad Sosa	Disqualified; March 19
Josué Muñoz	March 18
Melanie Figueroa	March 11
Elionaid Iñiguez	March 4
Gustavo Gutiérrez	February 25
Guadalupe Castro	February 18
Season 4 (2007)
Juan Antonio Vélez	Winner; May 20
Iván Oswaldo López	2nd Place
Víctor Antonio Santiago	3rd Place
Nat Vásquez	4th Place
Frances Marrero	May 12
José Luis Vargas	May 5
Erica Gonzaba	April 28
Ramón Alberto García	April 21
Arturo Guerrero	April 14
Natalia Herrera	April 7
Luz María Aguilar	March 31
Nathalie Rodríguez	March 31
Aidsa Rodríguez	March 24
Edgar Alberto Pérez	March 24
Jorge Ochoa	March 17
Héctor Arreguin	March 17
Marissa Meza	March 10
Lizmarie Goldilla	March 3
Julissa Morel	February 24
Marleen Salinas	February 17
Season 5 (2008)
Cristina Eustace	Winner; May 18
Samuel Colón	2nd Place
Yaindhi Álvarez	3rd Place
Jonathan Rios	4th Place
Jometh Andújar	May 10
Javier Baerga	May 3
Karen Rodríguez	April 26
Sammy Genao	April 19
Yerly Burgos	April 12
Josué Pérez	April 5
Leonardo Méndez	March 29
Yaritza Rodríguez	March 29
Luis Javier Chávez	March 22
Diana Mercado	March 22
Ronny Mercedes	March 15
Magdalena León	March 15
Blanca Rosa Alfonso	March 8
Dalila Santa María	March 1
Alfredo Lomeli	February 23
Luz Leguizamo	February 16
Season 6 (2009)
Fabián Torres	Winner; May 17
José Rubén Ruíz	2nd Place
Hannaní Peraza	3rd Place
José Aníbal Maldonado	May 9
Marko Castillo	May 2
Víctor Robles	April 26
Hecmarie Diaz	April 18
Amesis Román	April 11
Judith Olivencia	April 4
Urayoán Lizardi	March 28
Zugeil Vélez	March 21
Saúl Díaz	March 14
Tania Tirado	March 7
Andres Ríos	February 28
Leidy D. Gabriel	February 21
Jorge David Nieves	February 14
Season 7 (2025)
Dionicio Matos	Winner; November 2
Cristian Diana	2nd Place
Yancy Abril	3rd Place
Sheila Miranda	4th Place
Ariana Babilonia	October 25
Noelyz Vazquez	October 25
Kevin Dalí	October 18
Gustavo Muñoz	October 18
Miguel Angel Diaz	October 11
Vicky Carbonell	October 11
Taishmara Rivera	October 4
Andrea Rivera	October 4
Rafael Enrique Perez	September 27
Valente	September 27
Alexis Sicarios	September 20
Gala Vargas	September 14
Santiago Lopez	September 6
Emmanuel Otero	August 30th
Felix Torres	August 23rd
Genoveva Fraticelli	August 16

=== 2004: First season ===
See Objetivo Fama (season 1) for more information

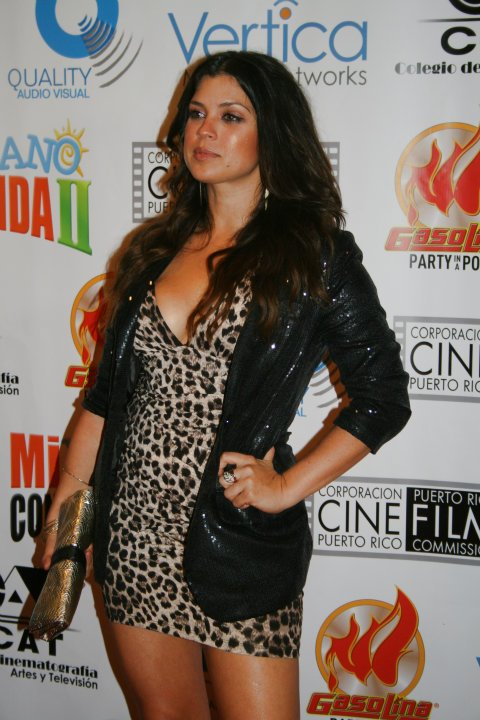
Season 1 winner Janina Irizarry

This season was hosted by Nicaraguan singer Luis Enrique, and Puerto Rican singer, actress and host Daniela Droz. It featured only Puerto Rican contestants aged 18 and older.

The winner of the show was Janina Irizarry (also known as simply Janina), but several of the contestants have released their own albums having different levels of success. As of 2007, Janina has released two successful albums.

Early on the show, one of the contestants, Encarnita "Kany" García, suffered a car accident, which forced her to abandon the competition. She was in intensive care for some time and recovered. She has turned since into a much-sought composer-songwriter. She wrote a song for Janina's first album. García in 2007 released her first album Cualquier Día, which includes the number 1 hit "Hoy Ya Me Voy". With the success of the album, she received praise from music critics, and many awards including two Billboard Latin Music Awards and two Latin Grammy Awards for Best New Artist and Best Female Pop Vocal Album. The album has been a success in Puerto Rico, the United States, and Latin America.

Charlie Rodríguez was the first contestant of the show to release his own album, and has also become a composer. He is currently working in his second album.

After the show, Luis Montes, Elliot Suro and Daniel Rodríguez joined Puerto Rican boy band MDO. They released an album titled Otra Vez which peaked some music charts in Latin America. Their follow-up, Sabe A Tí, was released in 2008.

Both finalists (Sheila and Ektor) have recorded albums. Ektor is currently working with producers Luny Tunes for his next album.

Zania Salas has turned into a producer of shows at Nickelodeon.

=== 2005: Second Season ===
See Objetivo Fama (season 2) for more information

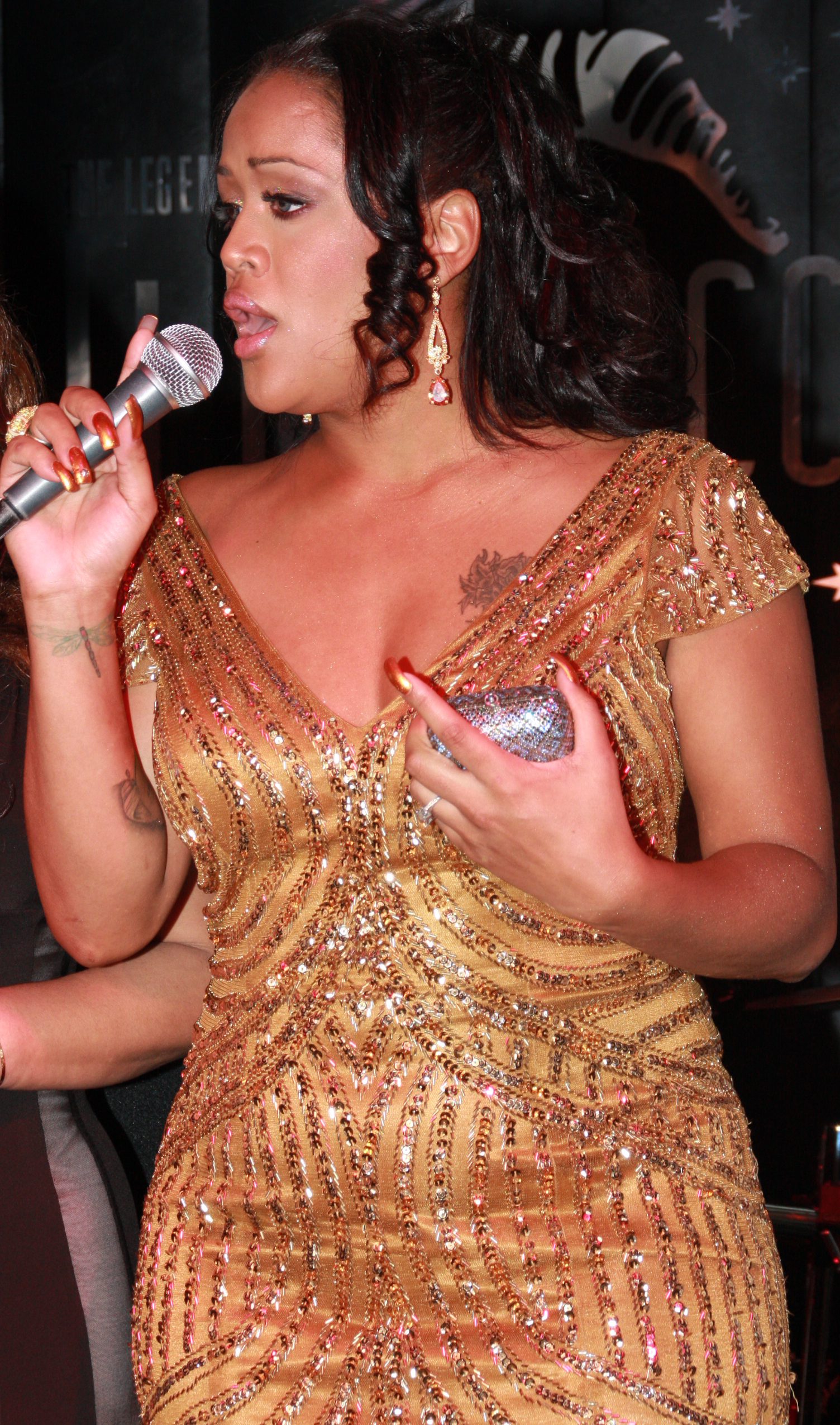
Season 2 winner, Anaís

This season was hosted by Mexican actor/singer, Víctor Noriega and Puerto Rican celebrity, Yizette Cifredo, and expanded the format to include international contestants.

The winner of the show was Dominican singer, Anaís Martínez, but - like the first season - several of the contestants have already launched their own musical careers. Anaís is widely considered to be the most successful winner of the show.

Carlos Rubén Salazar was disqualified from the competition when he abandoned the house to see a girlfriend (one of the show dancers). He is the brother of the first finalist, Azucena. They have been working together on several musical projects, even playing at the White House in an activity in 2006. Azucena released her first album in 2008.

Two of the other finalists, Jayro Rosado and Esteban, have released albums in the island and Jayro Rosado is currently a backup singer for Romeo Santos and is currently on tour with him. Another of the finalists, Rodolfo Castera, has worked hosting several events on the island and is currently finishing acting classes. Rosangela Abreu Crespo Abreu recorded a duet with famous Salsa singer, Gilberto Santa Rosa. Both Esteban and Rosangela Abreu Crespo auditioned for the 2007 season of Latin American Idol but Rosangela Abreu Crespo was the only one chosen to finish in third place.

Wenceslao Navarro has continued to work with his band and has released an album after the competition finished. Tairon Aguilera has dedicated himself to songwriting. He has written several songs for some of his fellow competitors of the show from past and future seasons, in January 2011 Tairon released his first album cd called "Tatuaje" in which he is the producer along with DJ gus. Emilio Acevedo is one of the singers of a merengue group called Zone D' Tambora, produced by Elvis Crespo.

In early 2007 the husband of Carmen Rivera was killed when he apparently intervened in a bar fight.

=== 2006: Third Season ===
See Objetivo Fama (season 3) for more information

This season was hosted by Mexican singer Yuri and directed by Marcelo Gama.

The winner of the show was Cuban Marlon Fernández, but several of the contestants have started their own musical careers not only singing but also in theatre.

During the show, Soledad Sosa was disqualified when she left the studio/house with her husband. She alleged that she couldn't stand being away from her husband. Shortly after, she got pregnant but had a miscarriage.

Ediberto Carmenatty was also disqualified when a medical condition forced him to do so. He has since recovered and is currently living in Ponce, Puerto Rico.

Also, Gustavo and Jenilca started a relationship during the show. Gustavo is currently working on an album while also preparing for some acting projects. Jenilca is promoting her album, "Jenilca" and her first single "Enamorada de Ti".

Arquímides & Mary Ann Acevedo have released successful albums in the island. Acevedo also married merengue singer, Guillermo Torres, who is about 20 years older.

Helen Ochoa and Melanie Figueroa started working on a project called "Dos Destinos". However, Figueroa's complications with her condition of lupus forced her to abandon the project. Ochoa has continued with the project and plans to release an album in early 2007. Figueroa is currently recovering.

=== 2007: Fourth Season ===
See Objetivo Fama (season 4) for more information.

This season was again hosted by Mexican singer, Yuri and directed by Marcelo Gama. The winner of the show was Puerto Rican Juan Vélez.

Unlike previous seasons, this one opened in Los Angeles, California, on February 3, with a pre-show where they presented the 30 semi-finalists chosen on the auditions through the United States and Puerto Rico. The 20 winners were announced and given a chance to perform.

The season officially opened on February 10. The weekly shows were aired from the Centro de Bellas Artes of Guaynabo, Puerto Rico, alongside the new building of the Univision station in Puerto Rico. So far, the judges agree that the competitors of this season are more consistent than in past ones.

Sin Editar, the weekly show where they follow the contestants lives at the studio/house and their rehearsals during the week, this year was broadcast every Friday, and hosted by Daniela Droz.

One of the highlights so far is the relationship started between Juan Vélez and Erica Gonzaba. On March 17, they had a chance to perform the song "Devuélveme la Vida" from Antonio Orozco together, which garnered them much praise and applause from both the judges and the audience. Vélez, winner of the show, had the chance to perform the song together with Orozco himself in the finale.

This season's finale emerged as the highest rated program in the history of Univision Puerto Rico, and USA Telefutura television broadcast stations.

After the show, finalists Juan, Iván, and Víctor have all released successful albums. Juan sold out several shows at the Luis A. Ferré Performing Arts Center in San Juan, and had a concert at the José Miguel Agrelot Coliseum.

=== 2008: Fifth Season ===
See Objetivo Fama (season 5) for more information

This fifth season was hosted by Yuri and directed by Marcelo Gama. The winner of the show was Mexican Cristina Eustace. It featured returning judges Roberto Sueiro and Fernando Allende. Mexican singer Jimena will replace Hilda Ramos. Still, Ramos has been featured weekly in the show Sin Editar offering her critics to the contestants.

The 20 final contestants were officially announced on February 2, 2008, during a show at the Puerto Rico Convention Center and the show officially began on February 9, 2008. A few days before, contestant Lorenzo Mendez was disqualified from the show because he was already signed to a record label. Ronny Mercedes was selected to replace him.

The first show featured special presentations from Los Super Reyes and last year winner, Juan Vélez.

On May 14, 2008, four days before the final show of the season, host Yuri announced that she had been fired from the show. Charytín will replace her for the final show. At the same time, the credibility of the show was questioned after a video mentioning the four finalists with two weeks of anticipation surfaced on YouTube. The video was prepared by PepsiCo as a promotion for a contest. The producers of the show have denied giving them any information about votes and results.

=== 2009: Sixth Season (The Farewell) ===
See Objetivo Fama (season 6) for more information.

In late 2008, it was announced that the sixth season would be the last. It was dubbed Objetivo Fama: La Despedida (Target Fame: The Farewell). The show featured Roberto Sueiro and Hilda Ramos as returning judges, while Christian singer Abraham would be the third judge, replacing Fernando Allende. This last season featured only 18 Puerto Rican contestants, like the first season, as opposed to the other seasons which had contestants from other countries.

This last season was hosted by singer Giselle. The winner was Fabián Torres, who ended up victorious with a 42.43 percent of the votes on the final show held on Sunday, May 17, 2009.

=== 2025: Seventh Season ===
On February 9, 2025, it was announced that Objetivo Fama would return for a seventh season later that same year. In March it was confirmed that Objetivo Fama would also be switching networks with the new season set to air on Telemundo Puerto Rico starting in August. The show will also broadcast outside of Puerto Rico through Estrella TV. Auditions for Objetivo Fama began in Puerto Rico on May 3rd and also took place in Miami, Florida, New York City, and Los Angeles in June. According to the station's press release Objetivo Fama will air the happenings from inside the house on Wednesdays and live performance episodes will be taking place on Saturdays from the Centro de Bellas Artes de Caguas.

The hosts for this season were Gil Marie Lopez and Jimena Gallego. Roberto Sueiro returned as a judge alongside Season 5 winner Cristina Eustace and singer Ana Isabelle. The show aired live performances on Saturdays at 7pm and the "unedited" version of the show that presented the happenings in the house between contestants aired Wednesdays at 7pm and was hosted by season 4 contestant Victor Santiago. Dionicio Matos was crowned the winner of season 7 on November 2nd, 2025

== Television ratings ==
Since its first years, Objetivo Fama has had the acceptance of Puerto Rican audiences. In 2005, the season finale of the second season was the #1 show of the night, garnering ratings of above 35 during its run, with its nearest competition being at 11. Further ratings revealed that the finale was also the most watched show of April 2005.

The season finale for the third season of Objetivo Fama, held in May 2006, also ended up #1 with the audience. In April 2007, the show dominated the ratings in Puerto Rico with 34.6, with related shows like Acceso Total and Sin Editar also doing well.

In January 2008, two special editions of Objetivo Fama that served as a preamble of the fifth season ended up in the first two places of the television ratings of January 2008. The show remained at the top of the ratings as the season went on, ranking at #2 during February 2008 and #1 in March and April of the same year. The show Acceso Total also ended up at the top finishing at #7. The rankings for the month of May 2008 also revealed that 7 of the Top 10 shows were related to Objetivo Fama.

The show's final season also received good ratings, finishing #1 during April (with 24.3) and May 2009.

The ratings for each season finale have been:

Season	Date	Rating	Ranking
1	April 24, 2004		
2	May 1, 2005	41	1
3	May 14, 2006		1
4	May 20, 2007		
5	May 18, 2008	42.8	1
6	May 17, 2009	33	1

== Musical impact ==
Various contestants of Objetivo Fama have gone on to have successful musical careers, winning musical awards and having success on various record charts. Contestants like Anaís Martínez and Cristina Eustace have been nominated to Latin Grammy Awards, while Anaís, Marlon Fernández, and Juan Vélez have been nominated for Billboard Music Awards. Season 1 contestant Kany García has been perhaps the most successful artist from the show, despite being the first contestant eliminated. She has gone on to record three successful albums and has been nominated to 2 Grammy Awards and 6 Latin Grammy Awards, winning two of them.

== See also ==
Similar shows

- Operación Triunfo
- American Idol
- Pop Idol
- Star Search
- La Academia
- Voces en Función

 Winners

- 2004: Janina (Puerto Rico)
- 2005: Anaís (Dominican Republic)
- 2006: Marlon (Cuba)
- 2007: Juan (Puerto Rico)
- 2008: Cristina (Mexico)
- 2009: Fabian (Puerto Rico)
- 2025: Dionicio (Venezuela)
