= Jimena (singer) =

Mexican pop singer, TV host, and actress (born 1980)

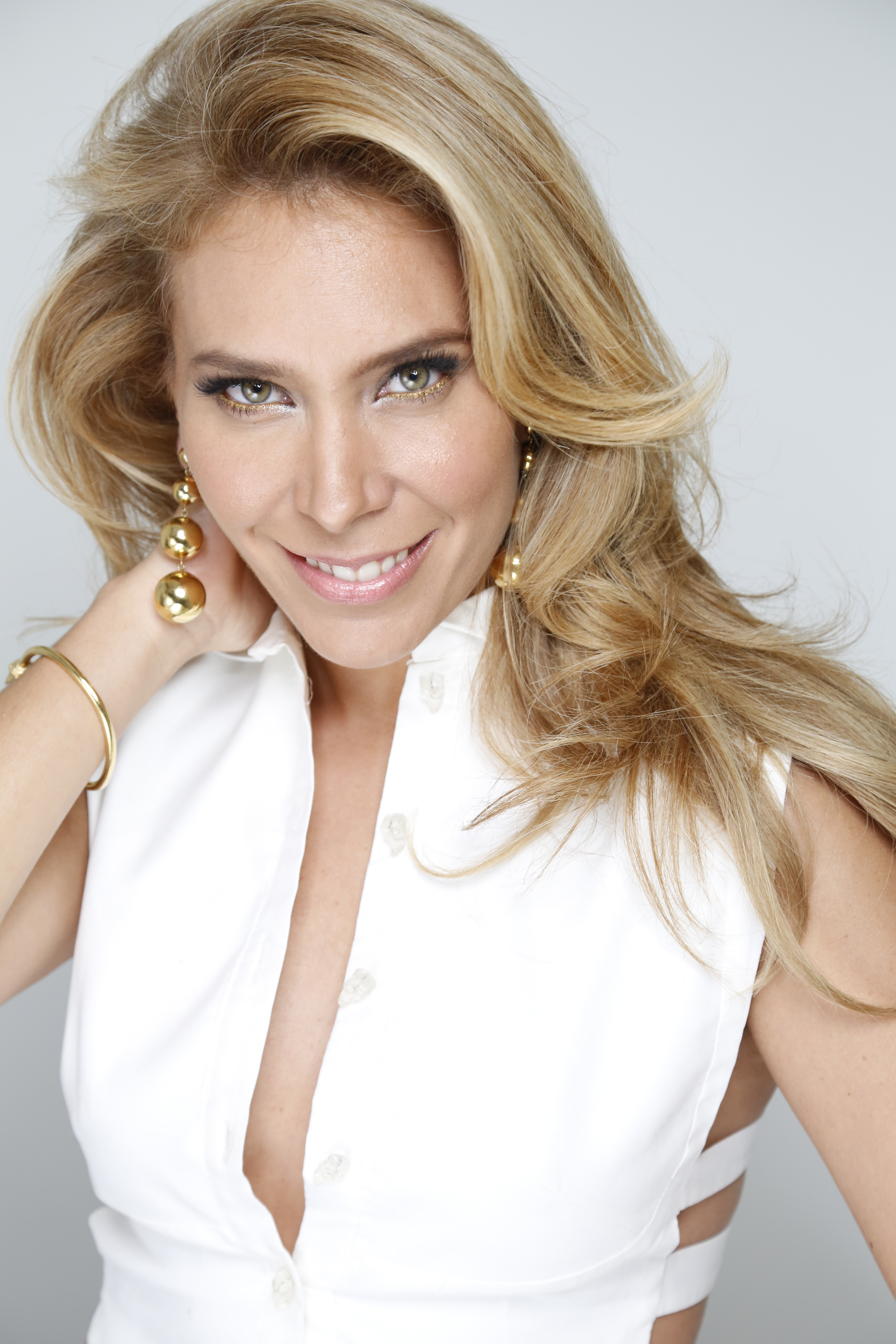

Background information
- Also known as: Jimena Carlsen
- Born: Jimena Gallego; 1980 (age 45–46)
- Origin: Mexico City, Mexico
- Genre: Latin
- Occupations: Singer, tv host, actress
- Years active: 1998–present
- Labels: Virgin; EMI; Univisión; Crescent Moon Records
- Website: Jimena Web Page

Jimena is a Mexican pop singer, TV host, and actress.

In 1999, she originally signed with Virgin and EMI under the name “Ximena” and released her self-titled debut album. In June 2001, she was then signed to Crescent Moon Records, a record label co-owned by Emilio Estefan and Sony Music. Her second album was Jimena after she reverted back to her birth name, which included ten songs, she wrote . The single Maldita ignorancia was released in three versions, norteña, ranchera and cumbia. She has worked with and trained with Eugenia Sutti, Patricia Reyes Spíndola, Luis Felipe Tovar, Savior Sánchez, and Natalia Travena.

In 2003 she signed an additional contract with Univisión Music. Her third album, En Soledad, was also produced by Emilio Estefan. She has been nominated for several awards, including Premios Lo Nuestro in 2004 for Artista Revelación and in 2006 for Singer of the Year, sharing the nomination alongside Paulina Rubio, Laura Pausini and Julieta Venegas.

In 2006, Jimena released her fourth album, Volar sin Alas, which was also Produced for Emilio Estefan and this time, her single "Que Onda Guey" Ft Akwid was written by Yan weynn [William Ramos Jr ] young writer sing to crescent moon records as a composer and this was an urban hit No. 3 in the album

She has performed in numerous venues, including Madison Square Garden, Miami Sand, and Staples Center in Los Angeles. She was a special guest in 2004, having been invited by president George W. Bush to perform in the White House.

In 2008, she started serving as a judge on the fifth season of Objetivo Fama, a Puerto Rican show similar to American Idol. She had served as a guest judge on the previous season for several shows.

In 2011 and 2012, Jimena co-hosted backstage the Televisa reality talent show Pequeños Gigantes, hosted by Galilea Montijo. The talent show currently airs on Univision.

In 2012, Jimena appeared as a guest star in Baila! Starring David Longoria, a TV Special featuring musical guests and live performances of trumpeter and singer David Longoria, rapper 5 Star and many others. The 90-minute Program included singers, musicians, dancers and guest stars. Jimena performed the Longoria penned pop trio song "Tugga War" along with David Longoria, and 5 Star. The special was broadcast on American public TV stations in 2012 and is scheduled for syndicated commercial American TV stations throughout 2013.

In 2012, Jimena appeared in the Mexican Telenovela Por ella soy Eva Starring Jaime Camil y Lucero, Produced by Rosy Ocampo for Televisa in 2012. Jimena played a small role as the journalist that cover a story on Eva at the end of the Soap Opera.

Since 2021, she has been the co-host of the reality series La casa de los famosos.

== Discography ==
=== Solo albums and singles ===
Information
Ximena
- Released: 1999
- Singles:
  - Dime por Qué
  - Estoy Enamorada de Ti
Jimena
- Released: 3 June 2003
- Singles:
  - Maldita ignorancia
  - No te vayas
  - Aunque tu no quieras
  - Y llegaste tú
En Soledad
- Released: 8 March 2005
- Singles:
  - En Soledad
  - No me Culpes
Volar Sin Alas
- Released: 22 August 2006
- Singles:
  - Volar Sin Alas
  - Que onda Güey
  - Que onda Güey featuring Akwid
