= Juan Vélez =

Puerto Rican singer-songwriter

- Born: Juan Antonio Vélez Rivera; August 2, 1983 (age 43); Ponce, Puerto Rico
- Origin: Puerto Rico
- Genre: Latin pop
- Occupations: Singer; songwriter
- Years active: 2007–present
- Label: Univision

Juan Antonio Vélez (born August 2, 1983 in Ponce, Puerto Rico) is a Puerto Rican singer and songwriter, better known for being the winner of the fourth season of Objetivo Fama, a Puerto Rican television singing talent contest in the form of a reality show, broadcast by Telefutura in the United States and by Univision in Puerto Rico.

== Artistic career ==
In 2007, Vélez held four successful concerts at the Centro de Bellas Artes and recently released his first single. His debut album Con Mi Soledad, was released on December 11, 2007. It was nominated for a Billboard Music Award for Best Pop Album from New Generation. On April 25, 2008, he presented his first concert at the José Miguel Agrelot Coliseum in Puerto Rico. On June 3, 2008, Vélez received an homage as part of a celebration organized by the Office of Youth Matters of Puerto Rico. A single has already been released titled Te Tengo o Te Perdi which is also used in the Latin novela El Clon.

== Discography ==
- Con Mi Soledad (2007)
- Te Tengo o Te Perdí (EP, 2010)

== Personal life ==
During the auditions of Objetivo Fama in Los Angeles, Vélez met fellow contestant Erica Gonzaba, from San Antonio, Texas. Since they were both selected, they started a friendship which later developed into a formal relationship. This was announced at the sixth Gala (March 17, 2007) when Vélez and Gonzaba confessed they had fallen in love with each other. The couple broke up in September, 2007. After ending their relationship, Gonzaba was cast as a model for Vélez's video "Buscando Tu Sombra", which was the second single off his album.

== See also ==
- List of Puerto Ricans
- Objetivo Fama (Fourth Season)
- Puerto Rican songwriters
- Janina Irizarry
- Anaís
- Marlon Fernández

Preceded by Marlon Fernández	Objetivo Fama; Winner; Season 4 (2007)	Succeeded by Cristina Eustace
