= Marlon Fernández (singer) =

Cuban singer

- Born: August 24, 1977 (age 48)
- Origin: Cuba
- Genres: Latin pop, salsa
- Years active: 2006–present
- Labels: Univision Records (previously), Universal
- Website: Marlon on Univision

Marlon Fernández (born August 24, 1977, in Cuba) is a Cuban singer, better known as the winner of the third season of Objetivo Fama, a Puerto Rican reality show/singing talent contest broadcast by Univision Puerto Rico, and Telefutura network in the United States.

== Biography ==
Marlon Fernández was born in La Lisa, Cuba, in 1977 to José and Raquel Fernández. At the age of 14, he formed a five-piece band that would help him in his future career.

In 2001, he had an accident that threatened his right leg and moved to Tenerife, Canary Islands for treatment. During his stay there, he participated and won in a talent competition called El Concurso de la Juventud. He followed the competition by performing at several clubs and restaurants in Spain. In 2003, he moved to Miami, Florida, where he started singing at several venues, including Mango's restaurant, with his band called La Química.

In 2005, he auditioned to participate in the third season of Objetivo Fama. During the show, he excelled with his interpretations and ended up winning getting over a million votes on the final night.

On October 24, 2006, he released his debut album titled Mi Sueño by Univision Records which peaked at No. 7 on Billboard's Latin Tropical chart. Marlon's first single was a cover of Willie Colón & Celia Cruz's hit "Usted Abusó", which he released alongside La India. The latter has always been Fernández's idol, and they met during the contest. The single peaked in the Top 10 in the Tropical Airplay Charts.

In January 2007, Marlon asked to be released from Univision Music Group. He was unsatisfied with how they were managing his career.

In 2007, he was nominated for a Billboard Latin Music Award for the Best Tropical Album. He was also nominated for two Lo Nuestro Awards. He also had a successful presentation at the Calle 8 Festival with Cachao López.

In January 2008, Marlon released a tribute to Dominican singer Juan Luis Guerra titled Homenaje a Juan Luis Guerra.

In 2009, Marlon released Estoy de Pie. The lead single, "Hagamoslo Aunque Duela" reached No. 1 on the Tropical Airplay charts.

In 2010, Marlon moved to Homestead, Florida where he acquainted friends with his neighbor, Adonis, who would help him write and produce some of his songs.

=== Personal life ===
Marlon has been married for more than 10 years with Daysel Miró. He currently resides in Puerto Rico.

== Discography ==
Mi Sueño

- Released: October 24, 2006
- Label: Univision
- Singles: "Usted Abusó" (with La India), "¿A Quién?"

Homenaje a Juan Luis Guerra

- Released: January 29, 2008
- Label: La Calle Records
- Singles: "La Bilirrubina", "Bachata Rosa"

Estoy De Pie

- Released: August 18, 2009
- Label: Machete Music
- Singles: "Hagamoslo Aunque Duela"

Regalo De Navidad

- Released: May 25, 2011
- Label: Warner

Déjalos Que Hablen

- Released: September 9, 2016
- Label: M.E.D. Entertainment Inc.

Preceded by Anaís Martínez	Objetivo Fama; Winner; Season 3 (2006)	Succeeded by Juan Vélez
