= Iván López (singer) =

Mexican singer (born 1985)

- Born: Iván Oswaldo López; March 16, 1985 (age 40)
- Origin: Mexico City, Mexico
- Genres: Pop
- Occupation: singer
- Instrument: vocals
- Years active: 2007–present

Iván Oswaldo López (born March 16, 1985, in Mexico City, Mexico) is a Mexican singer known for coming in second place on the fourth season of reality/talent show Objetivo Fama.

On October 30, 2007, Iván released his first album titled La Voz. The title is a reference to the nickname that Hilda Ramos, judge of Objetivo Fama, gave him during one of the shows.

Year	Album information
2007	La Voz: Release date: October 30, 2007; 1st studio album; Singles: 2007 ""
