= Fabián Torres =

Chilean footballer (born 1989)

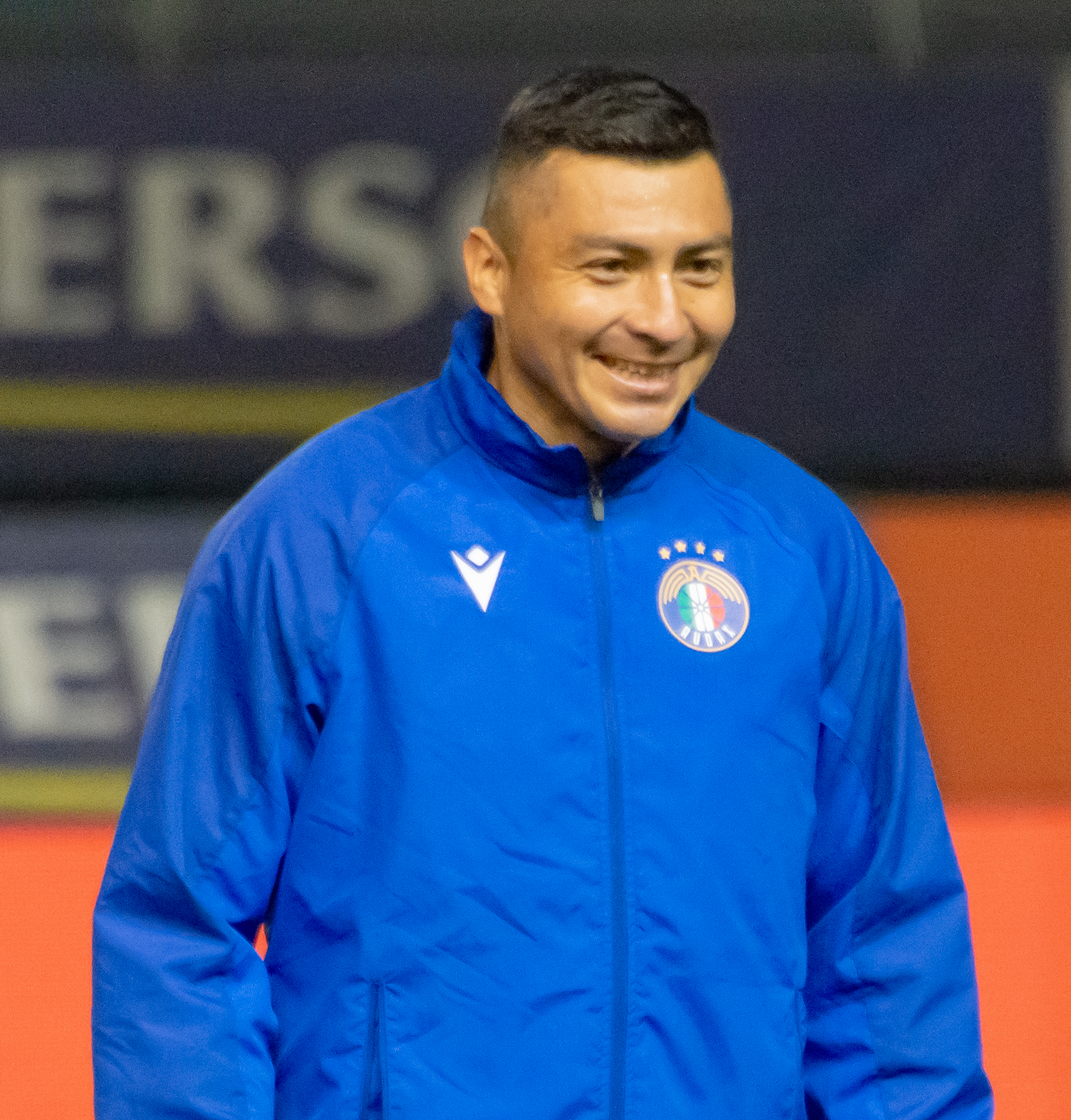
- Torres with Audax Italiano in 2023

Personal information
- Full name: Fabián Andrés Torres Cuello
- Date of birth: 27 April 1989 (age 37)
- Place of birth: Copiapó, Chile
- Height: 1.80 m (5 ft 11 in)
- Position: Defender

Team information
- Current team: Deportes Copiapó
- Number: 5

Youth career
- Universidad de Chile

Senior career*
Years	Team	Apps	(Gls)
2008–2009	Universidad de Chile	0	(0)
2008	→ Provincial Osorno (loan)	18	(0)
2009	→ Iberia (loan)	–	(–)
2011–2017	Iberia	141	(15)
2017–2018	Coquimbo Unido	15	(2)
2018–2024	Audax Italiano	156	(13)
2025–	Deportes Copiapó	29	(0)
- * Club domestic league appearances and goals as of 19 January 2026

Fabián Andrés Torres Cuello (born 27 April 1989) is a Chilean footballer who plays as a defender for Deportes Copiapó.

== Career ==
Torres spent seven seasons with Audax Italiano from 2018 to 2024. In 2025, Torres returned to his hometown and signed with Deportes Copiapó.
