= Mary Ann Acevedo discography =

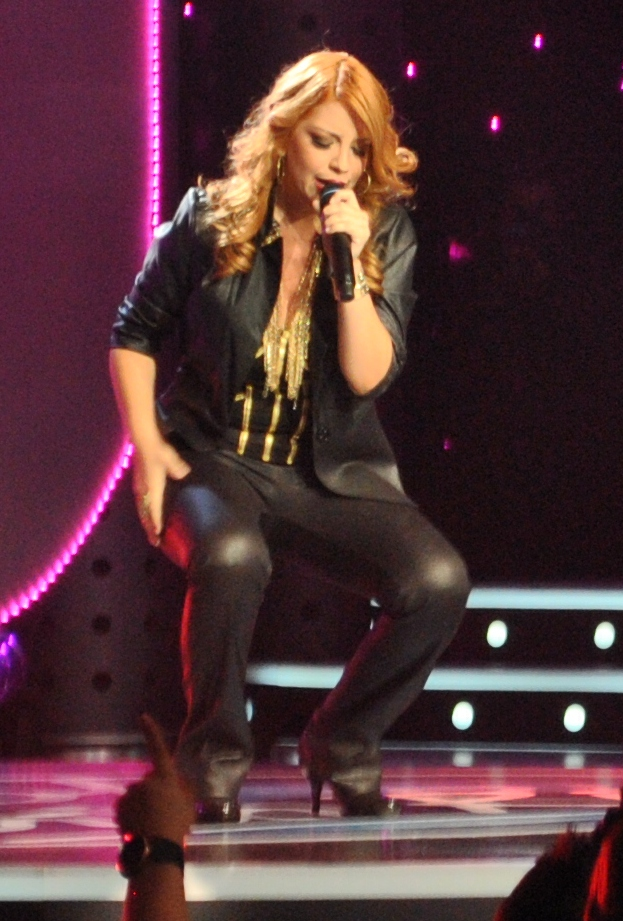
- Studio albums: 3
- Singles: 5
- Music videos: 6
- Promotional singles: 3

The discography of Mary Ann Acevedo, a Puerto Rican singer-songwriter, actress and musician, contains three studio albums, five singles, three promotional singles, and six music videos.

== Albums ==
=== Studio albums ===
Title	Album details	Peak chart positions
Mary Ann	Released: October 31, 2006; Label: Univision Music Group, La Calle Records; Formats: CD, digital download	
Cántale a tu Bebé	Released: September 1, 2009; Label: GT Music; Formats: CD, digital download	–
Génesis	Released: January 1, 2012; Label: GT Music; Formats: CD, digital download	–
"—" denotes releases that did not chart.

=== Collaborations ===
Title	Collaboration albums details
Navidad Boricua: Así es Puerto Rico	Released: December 2004; Label: GT Music; Format: CD
Con Tus Estrellas En Vivo	Released: June 2006; Label: Univision Music Group, Acisum Group; Formats: CD, digital download
Navidad Boricua: Mi Pueblo esta de Fiesta	Released: December 2007; Label: GT Music; Format: CD
Tu Favorito	Released: November 18, 2008; Label: GT Music; Format: VMP
"—" denotes releases that did not chart.

== Singles ==
Single	Year	Peak chart positions		Album
Single	Year	US	US Adult	Album
"Mírame"	2006	–	—	Mary Ann
"Que Ironía"	2007	–	—	Mary Ann
"Débil"	2007	–	—	Mary Ann
"Llegaste Tú"	2009	–	—	Cántale a tu Bebé
"Génesis"	2012	–	—	Génesis
"—" denotes single that did not chart or was not released

=== Promotional singles ===
Single	Year	Album
"Noche de Paz" (feat. Chucho Avellanet)	2004	Navidad Boricua: Así es Puerto Rico
"El Hombre que Yo Amo" (feat. Briggette)	2006	Con Tus Estrellas En Vivo
"Chicas"	2011	Tu Favorito

== Other projects ==
- Songs written and co-written by Mary Ann Acevedo.

Song	Written for	Notes
"Amarte y Olvidarte"	Yazmine Esparza	Song written for Yazmine studio album after being eliminated from American Idol

== Music videos ==
Song	Year	Director
"Noche de Paz" (feat. Chucho Avellanet)	2004	Guillermo Torres
"Mirame"	2006	Guillermo Torres
"Que Ironía"	2007	
"Débil"	2007	
"Llegaste Tú"	2009	
"Génesis"	2012	Guillermo Torres
