= Génesis (Mary Ann Acevedo album) =

Studio album by Mary Ann Acevedo
- Released: January 1, 2012
- Recorded: 2007–2011
- Genre: Pop, merengue
- Length: 37:00 (CD); 36:47 (Digital)
- Label: GT Musik / PRTV
- Producer: Ray Cruz (executive); Guillermo Torres (co-exec.)

Mary Ann Acevedo chronology
Cántale a tu Bebé (2009)	Génesis (2012)

Singles from Génesis
- 1. "Génesis" Released: March 15, 2010

"Génesis" is the name given to the third studio album by the Puerto Rican singer, songwriter and actress, Mary Ann Acevedo, released on January 1, 2012 worldwide through digital download and on December 7, 2012 on compact disc. Originally the album was confirmed for release in February 2010 as "El Amor es la Solución", but with the birth of her daughter, Mary Ann had to delay the departure of the album to April 2010; then GT Musik announced the album release was delayed for a few months. She agreed that her homonymous first album was a continuation of her tenure in the third edition of "Objetivo Fama". On that album, the songs were chosen when Mary Ann left the reality show; in December she was released a special production titled Cántale a tu Bebé.

== Background ==
This album is the comeback of Mary Ann to the music. After her pregnancy, her album of lullabies and being a contestant in the reality show Idol Puerto Rico, Mary Ann took more time to delay the album's release. It was thought that the album would be called "El Amor es la Solución" (Love is the Solution), but apparently "Genesis" proved to be a more commercial and more welcoming to the public as the first single from the CD is titled the same way. "Génesis", the official single from this album was released in March 2010, popularized by Lucecita Benítez. Mary Ann wants to convert it back into a hymn as she did Lucecita Benítez in 1969. She hopes that her fans know this song that was a success in the '70s. For Mary Ann is an honor to sing this song was an anthem of Puerto Rico through the beautiful voice of Lucecita. She has sung the theme in the concerts of "Los Favoritos". Genesis is an album that portrays the influence of Mary Ann, including covers of songs that the public has known in the voices of Rocio Durcal, Celine Dion, Mariah Carey and other singers. In addition, Mary Ann includes a new version of the song "Todo para Mi" featuring the jazz flautist Néstor Torres; song that is on her first album with the title "Todo Eres Tú." Besides, this production integrates a merengue version of the song "Mírame".

== Track listing ==
No.	Title	Composer	Length
1.	"Génesis"	Guillermo Venegas Lloveras	2:54
2.	"Entre Tú y Yo"	Angela Dávalos, Bruno Danzza	3:18
3.	"Cerca del Arco Iris"	Harold Arlen, Yip Harburg, Mary Ann Acevedo, Guillermo Torres	2:37
4.	"La Oración (feat. Rawy Torres)"	David Foster, Carole Bayer Sager. Rawy Torres	4:29
5.	"Regresa a Mí"	Ana María García	3:28
6.	"Tú Sí Que Sabes"	Perez Botija García, Rafael Ramos	3:32
7.	"Y Tú Cómo Estás (E Tu Come Stai)"	Caludio Bagliono	2:58
8.	"Todo Para Mí (feat. Néstor Torres)"	Guillermo Torres	3:45
9.	"Medley de la Fama ("Héroe"/ "Contigo en la Distancia" / "Que Ganas de no Verte Nunca Más")"	Jorge Luis Piloto / César Portillo De La Luz / Alejandro Vezzani	6:40
10.	"Mírame (Merengue version)"	Guillermo Torres	3:40

iTunes Edition - Digital download
No.	Title	Composer	Length
1.	"Regresa a Mí"	Ana María García	3:25
2.	"Génesis"	Guillermo Venegas Lloveras	2:51
3.	"Tú Sí Que Sabes"	Perez Botija García, Rafael Ramos	3:29
4.	"Entre tú y yo"	Angela Dávalos, Bruno Danzza	3:16
5.	"Cerca del Arco Iris"	Harold Arlen, Yip Harburg (Original). Mary Ann Acevedo, Guillermo Torres (Translated)	2:33
6.	"Y Tú Cómo Estás (E Tu Come Stai)"	Caludio Bagliono	2:57
7.	"Todo Para Mí (feat. Nestor Torres)"	Guillermo Torres	3:41
8.	"La Oración (feat. Rawy Torres)"	David Foster, Carole Bayer Sager (Original). Rawy Torres (Translated)	4:23
9.	"Medley de la Fama ("Héroe"/ "Contigo en la Distancia" / "Que Ganas de no Verte Nunca Más")"	Jorge Luis Piloto / César Portillo De La Luz / Alejandro Vezzani	6:36
10.	"Mírame (Merengue version)"	Guillermo Torres	3:36

== Single ==
The title track was released as a single from the album on March 16, 2010, to national radio. It is a cover of the song popularized by Lucecita Benítez in 1969. Acevedo wanted to convert it back into a hymn as Benítez did. She has sung the theme in the concerts of "Los Favoritos".

Acevedo said to a newspaper of Puerto Rico that she is not afraid to receive a critique from Benítez if she is not pleased with her new version. She said her greatest satisfaction is that "La Voz Nacional de Puerto Rico" to hear this new version of "Genesis" because she (Lucecita) has been her inspiration. "This is the perfect song for the world, the only thing that will exist is the love...I will be honored that she heard my music". She emphasized that "I don't consider Lucecita, will do a bad review. I think she should feel proud to be an inspiration to me". She stressed that the song "Genesis", composed by Guillermo Venegas Lloveras, undergo changes at the musical level, it is updated. The ballad came to the studio a month and a week after the birth of their daughter, Anna Carolina, whom he had with the merengue Guillermo Torres.

== Release history ==
Region	Date	Label	Format
Worldwide	January 1, 2012	PRTV / GT Musik	Digital download
Puerto Rico	December 7, 2012	PRTV / GT Musik	Compact disc

== Personnel ==
- Vocals: Mary Ann Acevedo
- Keyboards: Martín Nieves, Guillermo Torres, Bob Benozzo
- Bass: Ricardo Encarnación, Edgardo Sierra
- Guitar: Jorge Laboy, Rawy Torres, George De León
- Violin: Inoel Jirau, Walter Alberguini, Enrique Collazo, David Betancourt, Alexis Velázquez, Marcos Gómez, Fernando Medina
- Viola: Emanuel Olivieri, María Santiago
- Cello: Harry Almodovar, Gabriel Acevedo
- Drums: Carlos De León, Efrain Rodríguez

=== Production ===
- Executive Producer: Ray Cruz, Guillermo Torres
- Mastering: The Sound Lab (Miami, FL)
- Engineers:Carlos Velázquez, Ramón Martínez, Wilson Torres, Nestor Gonzalez
- Recorded and Mixed: Ramón Martínez, Carlos Velázquez
- Photography: Edwin David Cordero
- Art Direction and design: Wewx Collazo (Arte Grafico &...)
- Stylist: Juan Angel Pacheco
- Makeup: Juan Angel Pacheco

== Locations and studios ==
Recording locations and studios included:

- Playback Recording - (San Juan, PR)
- Altavox Studio - (Milan, Italy)
- Sonic Boutique - (Miami, FL)
- Sonoteck Studios - (San Juan, PR)
