= Mary Ann Acevedo =

Puerto Rican singer (born 1987)

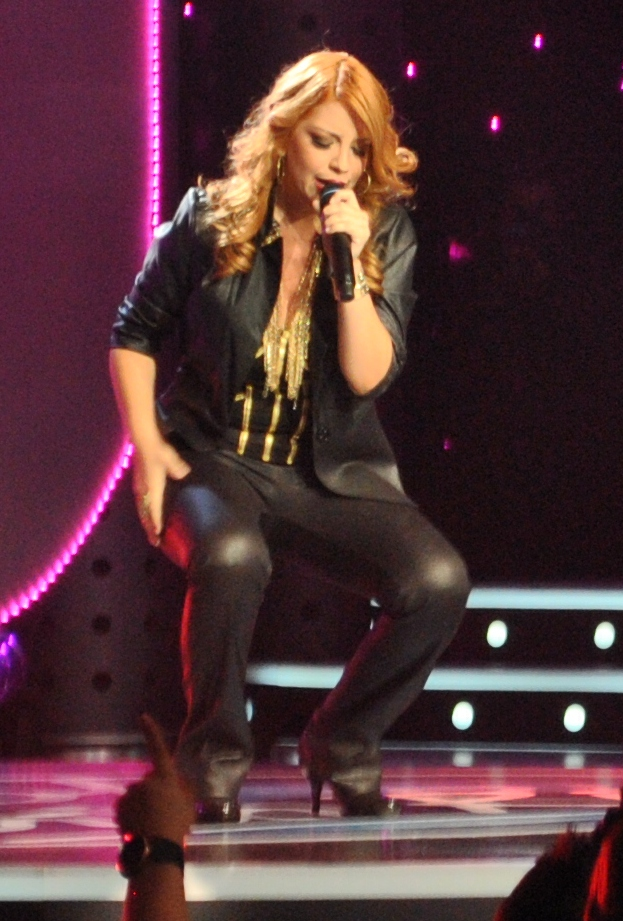
- Acevedo singing in Idol Puerto Rico (2011)

Background information
- Also known as: Lya; Mary Ann; La Voz de Puerto Rico
- Born: Mary Ann Acevedo Rivera; June 23, 1987 (age 39); Cabo Rojo, Puerto Rico
- Origin: Puerto Rican
- Genres: Pop, Latin, Latin pop
- Occupations: Singer, songwriter, actress
- Instrument: Vocals
- Years active: 1998–present
- Labels: GT Music – (2009–2011); Universal Latin – (2008–2009); Univision Music – (2006–2008)
- Website: maryannacevedo.com

Mary Ann Acevedo Rivera (Spanish: [ˈmeɾi ˈan aseˈβeðo]; born June 23, 1987), better known as Mary Ann, is a Puerto Rican singer and songwriter. She is known for being a contestant on the third season of Objetivo Fama (2006) and the first season of Idol Puerto Rico (2011). Acevedo was the first contestant of Objetivo Fama to release an album.

== Early life ==
Mary Ann was born in Cabo Rojo, Puerto Rico, on June 23, 1987. She is the daughter of Ana M. Rivera Colón and Jesús Acevedo; and sister of Keitha Acevedo and Jesús Manuel Acevedo.

Mary Ann began singing at age 11 at her school.

== Career ==
Mary Ann became part of the TV show A Toda Maquina, which she sang on for three years.

=== 2006–2008: Objetivo Fama, Mary Ann, and Los Favoritos ===
In 2006, Mary Ann was a contestant on the third season of Objetivo Fama 3, which was viewed by around 14 million people over four months. She came in fourth place in the competition.

Songs performed by Mary Ann on Objetivo Fama 3 in 2006:

- "El Frío de Tu Adiós" (Olga Tañon)
- "Amar Sin Ser Amada" (Thalía)
- "Como Tu Mujer" (Rocío Dúrcal)
- "Bandolero" (Olga Tañon)
- "Vivo Por Ella" (Andrea Bocelli and Marta Sánchez)
- "Contigo En La Distancia" (Christina Aguilera)
- "El Hombre Que Yo Amo" (Myriam Hernández)
- "Si No Te Hubiera Conocido" (Luis Fonsi and Christina Aguilera)
- "Que Ganas De No Verte Nunca Más" (Lupita D'Alessio)
- "Héroe" (Mariah Carey)
- "A Que Vuelve" (Gisselle)
- "Si Tu No Estas Aquí" (Rosana)
- "Tu si que sabes amar" (Rocío Dúrcal)
- "Fuera de mi vida" (Valeria Lynch)

In October 2006, Mary Ann became the first contestant on Objetivo Fama to release her own record, her debut self-titled album (Mary Ann). It was produced by Italian record producer Bob Benozzo and arranged by Sergio George, Eduardo Barreras and Eduardo Reyes. It consisted of pop ballads. The first single released was "Mírame". Her songs were played both in Puerto Rico and abroad. Mary Ann became the second best-selling album in Puerto Rico in 2006.

On 26 April 2008, Mary Ann sang a duet with Cristina Eustace (winner of the Objetivo Fama Fifth Season) of the song "Fuera De Mi Vida".

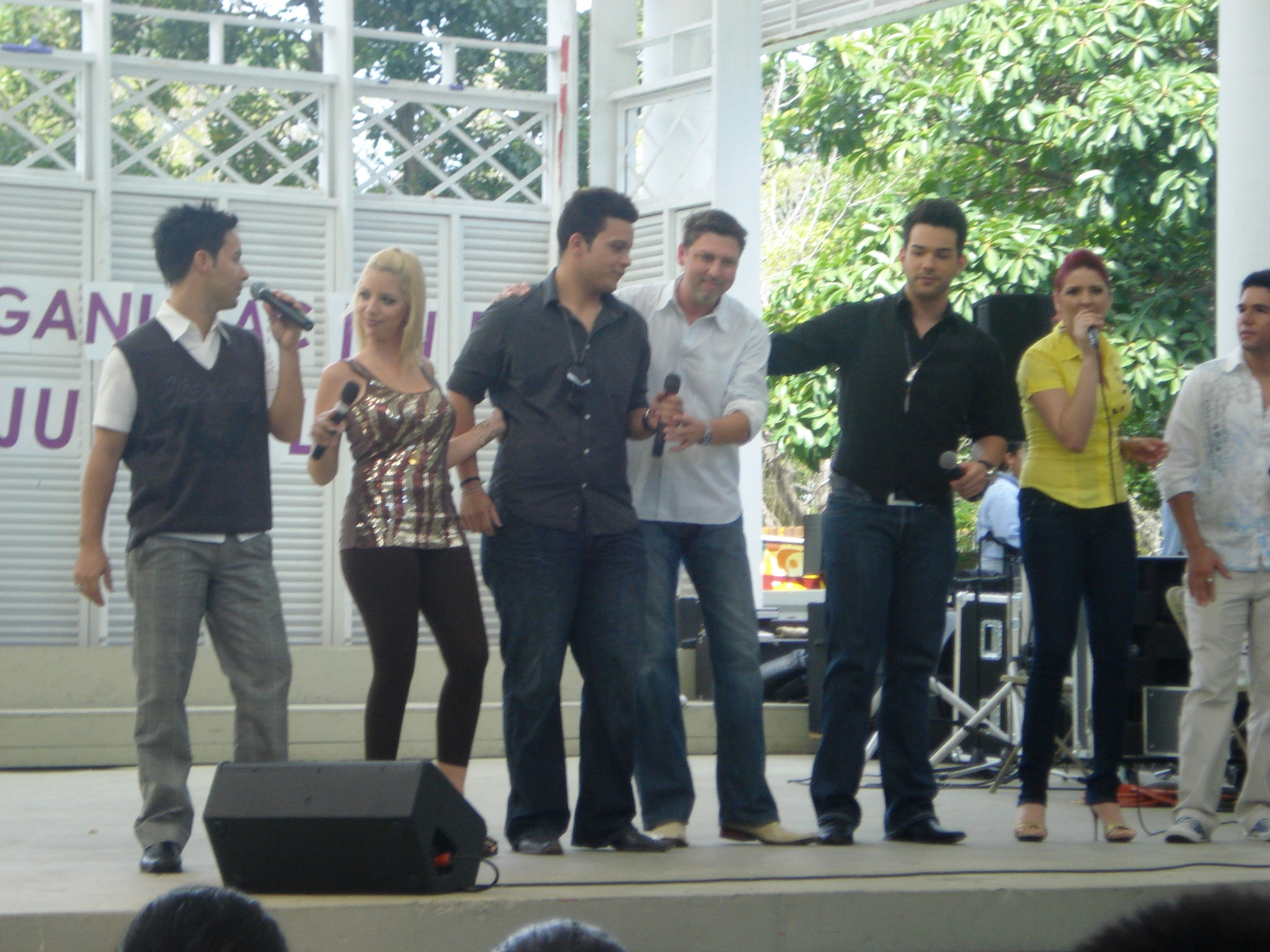
"Los Favoritos" singing in the Luis Muñoz Rivera Park

On 2 May 2009, Mary Ann sang a duet of the song "Mírame" (the first single of Mary Ann Acevedo's album) with Hannaní Peraza on the last season of Objetivo Fama.

From 2008 to 2009, Mary Ann performed alongside Arquímides Gonzáles, Ediberto, Mary Ann Acevedo, Blanca Rosa, Jometh Andujar and Jonathan (ex-participants of Objetivo Fama) at the concert Los Favoritos: The Show (which included acting and singing). The first concert was performed at the Centro de Bellas Artes Luis A. Ferré. Francisco Zamora, their former teacher on Objetivo Fama, also appeared on stage. The event sought to convey a message of hope and motivation to young people. It had a live orchestra under the direction of Guillermo Torres (Mary Ann's husband) and choreography by Danny Lugo.

=== 2009: Cántale a tu Bebé ===
At the end of 2006, Mary Ann had started recording her second album with the label Univision Music Group, which was to be released in mid-March and May 2008. The album was to be produced and directed by Francisco Zamora and Guillermo Torres. At this time, the label was sold to Universal Music. As a result, Mary Ann, ended her contract with the label.

Mary Ann composed the songs for the album with Torres. The album Cántale a tu Bebé was released on 5 October 5, 2009. It consists of lullabies written for babies that reflect the sentiments of mothers.

=== 2009: Flow: El Musical ===
Mary Ann performed in the musical Flow: El Musical, an urban adaptation of the opera Carmen. It was presented at the Centro de Bellas Artes Luis A. Ferre on 17 September 2009. She played the character Nica. Other performers in the musical included musicians Auudi and Javier Baerga, and the model and TV presenter, Natalia Rivera.

=== 2010: Génesis (single) ===
In January 2010, Mary Ann announced the name of the first single of her third studio album on her website: "Génesis". The single was produced by Guillermo Torres. The song was composed by Guillermo Venegas Lloveras. It is a classic of Latin music and was sung by Lucecita Benítez, better known as "La Voz Nacional de Puerto Rico", who won the Festival de la Canción Latina (Mexico) in 1969. The single was set to be part of Mary Ann's album El Amor es la Solución, which was scheduled to go on sale in February 2010, but the date was changed to mid April 2010, then GT Music announced the release of the album was cancelled. "Génesis" was released on 18 June 2010, for digital download through iTunes.

=== 2011: Idol Puerto Rico ===
In May 2011, Mary Ann auditioned for the reality show Idol Puerto Rico in Hiram Bithorn Stadium. At the first casting, Acevedo sang the song "Que Lastima" by Lourdes Robles. She was part of the 80 selected to go to the second round. In her second casting (which was divided into two presentations), she sang "No Te Mentia" and then the song "Recuerdame" with Luis Xavier Zayas (participant of Idol Puerto Rico). Mary Ann was selected for the competition as one of 24 semi-finalists. On 4 August 2011, it was announced on the live entertainment program SuperXclusivo that Mary Ann was one of the 12 participants to go through to the finals.

The first live concert for the participants of the reality show was held on 5 September, where Acevedo played the song "Aprenderé" by Ednita Nazario, receiving good reviews from the jury. However, there had been some controversy at the time, as the public felt that Mary Ann had more experience than the other contestants because of her involvement in Objetivo Fama and the fact that she recorded three albums as a professional singer with a music label, as well as performing with other singers, headlining concerts in Puerto Rico and being a guest artist for awards shows.

The second live concert was held on 15 September, where Mary Ann was given good reviews for her performance with the song "Todos Me Miran" by Gloria Trevi. The Third Live Concert was held on September 19, where Mary Ann received the best reviews of the jury, but was eliminated as she was given the fewest votes from the public. She was the second participant eliminated from the competition.

=== 2012: Génesis ===
Mary Ann had a break between her second and third studio album to have her child and participate in Idol Puerto Rico.

On 1 January 2012, Mary Ann released her third studio album, Génesis. The album was originally going to be called El Amor es la Solución (Love is the Solution), but Genesis was thought to be a more commercial as it took the name of the first single.

The album including covers of songs previously sung by artists including Rocio Durcal, Celine Dion and Mariah Carey. It also includes a new version of the song "Todo para Mi" (a song that is on her first album with the title "Todo Eres Tú"), this time featuring the jazz flautist Néstor Torres. It also features a merengue version of "Mírame".

== Musical influences ==
Mary Ann has been influenced by several Puerto Rican artists. Marc Anthony is a key influence and she has expressed the desire to do a duet with him.

== Reception ==
In 2008, Mary Ann was honored by the Mexican gay community during the eighteenth "Parada de Orgullo de las Comunidades Lésbico, Homosexual, Bisexual, Transgénero y Transexual" (LGBT) at the "Parque del Tercer Milenio" in San Juan, Puerto Rico. There she sang songs including "Débil" and "Si No Estas Aquí" and was surprised with the award given by Samantha Love. She thanked the community saying that her music has "no color, no sex, no nothing. I've always thought that when you're happy, do what you want"

Mary Ann's has been proclaimed as "La Voz de Puerto Rico" (being an ambassador for this title as Lucecita Benítez, who is known as "La Voz Nacional de Puerto Rico").

== Discography ==
=== Studio albums ===
- 2006: Mary Ann
- 2009: Cántale a tu Bebé
- 2012: Génesis

=== Other albums ===
- 2006: Con tus Estrellas En Vivo
- 2007: Navidad Boricua: Mi Pueblo esta de Fiesta
- 2008: Tu Favorito
- Mary Ann participated in the Christmas compilation album "Navidad Boricua: Mi Pueblo esta de Fiesta".

== Filmography ==
Television
Year	Title	Role	Network	Notes
1998–2001	A Toda Maquina	Herself	WIPR-TV	Musical cast
2006	Objetivo Fama	Herself	Univision	Reality show (season 3)
2006	Escandalo tv	Herself	Univision	Interview / Talk show
2006	Anda Pa'l Cara	Herself	Univision	Interview / Talk show
2007	Seguro que Yes	Herself	America CV	Interview / Talk show
2007	Calando Fuerte	Herself	America CV	Interview / Talk show
2007	MDA Sentimiento Telemaratón	Herself	Telemundo	Special Telethon / Musical guest
2008	El Resuelve	Herself as member of Los Favoritos	Telemundo	Game show
2008	Contigo	Herself as member of Los Favoritos	Puerto Rico TV	Interview / Variety show
2008	Objetivo Fama	Herself	Univision	Reality show / Guest artist (season 5)
2009	Objetivo Fama	Herself	Univision	Reality show / Guest artist (season 6)
2009	Anda Pa'l Cara	Herself	Univision	Interview / Talk show
2009–2010	Entre Nosotras	Host, TV presenter, musical guest	WAPA-TV	Talk show, variety show
2011	El Show de Eddie Miro	Herself, musical cast	Puerto Rico TV	Musical show / First season
2011	Idol Puerto Rico	Herself	WAPA-TV	Reality show (season 1)
2011	SuperXclusivo	Herself	WAPA-TV	Interview / Gossip show

== Performances ==
Mary Ann and Víctor Manuelle joined their voices in the KQ105 Concert and Sistema102 in Concert.

Mary Ann was a guest artist at the Premios Lo Nuestro.

Mary Ann has shared a stage with Alejandra Guzmán, Guillermo Dávila, Luis Enrique and Víctor Manuelle

== Personal life ==
=== Marriage to Guillermo Torres ===
Mary Ann married in December 2006, with the "merenguero" singer and former member of Grupo Kaos, Guillermo Torres.

On June 1, 2009, having tried for more than two years to get pregnant, Mary Ann and Torres announced on the program Anda Pa'l Cara that they were expecting their first child. She had learnt of her pregnancy on May 28, 2009. She planned to have a natural birth, without undergoing a caesarean section. She had planned to name the baby Maria Alejandra if it was a girl or Guillermo Enrique if it were a boy.

In December 2009, Mary Ann had been taken to the Auxilio Mutuo Hospital, Hato Rey, Puerto Rico, with contractions, but this was a false alarm.

On February 1, 2010, Acevedo and Torres had a daughter named Anna Carolina Torres Acevedo at the Auxilio Mutuo Hospital in San Juan. For Guillermo this was his sixth daughter, but the first time attending the birth of a baby.

In 2011, press reported an alleged separation between Mary Ann and Torres, which turned out to be true. After a reconciliation in August, there were other rumours about an alleged pregnancy, but she denied it at the second gala of the reality show Idol Puerto Rico. In November, Mary Ann posted on her official Facebook page that she had started the divorce proceedings with Torres. Both stated that they made the decision seeking the best welfare of their daughter.

=== Charity work ===
In 2009, Mary Ann joined RED, an organisation that helps children with HIV in Africa. She was involved in the campaign "USA Baby – Child Space", where with each baby car purchased at a store would include a percentage donation to RED.

=== Return to education ===
In January 2012, Mary Ann announced her intention to return to college and complete studies she began in 2006 and then left to enter Objetivo Fama. On January 24, Acevedo officially restarted her Bachelor of General Music Education-Vocal at Interamerican University of Puerto Rico, San German Campus.

== See also ==
- List of Puerto Ricans
- Mary Ann (disambiguation)
