= Génesis (Lucecita Benítez song) =

Song by Lucecita Benítez

Single by Lucecita Benítez
- Released: 1969
- Genre: Bolero
- Songwriter(s): Guillermo Venegas Lloveras

"Génesis" is a 1969 Spanish-language song sung by Puerto Rican singer Lucecita Benítez, written by Guillermo Venegas Lloveras. The song won a prize at the first Festival Mundial de la Canción Latina, held in Mexico, and placed Benítez on the Latin music international stage. The song is written in the form of a bolero.

== Cover versions ==
- "Génesis," title track of Génesis by Mary Ann Acevedo, 2012
