= Te Voy a Conquistar =

Te Voy a Conquistar may refer to:

- "Te Voy a Conquistar", a song by Intocable also included on their 2003 compilation album La Historia
- "Te Voy a Conquistar", a 2008 song by Los Favoritos from Tu Favorito
- "Te Voy a Conquistar", a song by Ricky Martin from his 1991 album of the same name
- Te Voy a Conquistar, a 2022 album and song by Raymix

== See also ==
- "Voy a Conquistarte", a song by Belinda from Belinda
