= Débil =

Débil may refer to:

- Debil, album by Die Ärzte 1984
- Débil, single by Puerto Rican singer Mary Ann Acevedo
