= Objetivo Fama season 3 =

Televised Puerto Rican talent show competition

Objetivo Fama
- Season 3
- Hosted by: Yuri
- Judges: Roberto Sueiro; Hilda Ramos; Fernando Allende
- Winner: Marlon Fernández
- Runner-up: Patty Contreras
- Finals venue: Centro de Bellas Artes, Caguas

Release
- Original network: Univision Puerto Rico
- Original release: February 11 – May 14, 2006

Season chronology
- ← Previous; Season 2 Next → Season 4

The third season of Objetivo Fama, the Puerto Rican singing talent contest, began on February 11, 2006. This season the judges are Roberto Sueiro, Hilda Ramos, and Fernando Allende. The show was hosted by Mexican singer Yuri.

== Final cutdown ==
Out of each audition, a group of semi-finalists were selected. Producers and judges then evaluated each and ended up selecting 20 contestants.

The 20 selected contestants were:

| # | Contestant | Home Town | Nationality | Age * |
|---|---|---|---|---|
| 1 | Arquímides González | Bayamón, Puerto Rico | (Puerto Rico) Puerto Rican | 19 |
| 2 | Brigitte Dávila | San Juan, Puerto Rico | (Puerto Rico) Puerto Rican | 19 |
| 3 | Ediberto Carmenatty | Boston, Massachusetts | (Puerto Rico) Puerto Rican | 18 |
| 4 | Edwin Gómez | New York City | (Dominican Republic) Dominican | 26 |
| 5 | Elionaid Iñiguez | San Antonio, Texas | (Mexico) Mexican | 22 |
| 6 | Francisco Salicrup | Boston, Massachusetts | (Dominican Republic) (Puerto Rico) Dominican/Puerto Rican | 24 |
| 7 | Guadalupe Castro | Tucson, Arizona | (Mexico) Mexican | 22 |
| 8 | Gustavo Gutiérrez | Chicago, Illinois | (Mexico) Mexican | 24 |
| 9 | Helen Ochoa | Fresno, California | (Mexico) Mexican | 20 |
| 10 | Jenilca Giusti | Orlando, Florida | (Puerto Rico) Puerto Rican | 24 |
| 11 | José Barraza | Fresno, California | (Mexico) Mexican | 21 |
| 12 | Josué Muñoz | Los Angeles, California | (Mexico) Mexican | 22 |
| 13 | Marlon Fernández | Miami, Florida | (Cuba) Cuban | 28 |
| 14 | Mary Ann Acevedo | Cabo Rojo, Puerto Rico | (Puerto Rico) Puerto Rican | 18 |
| 15 | Melanie Maher | San Juan, Puerto Rico | (Puerto Rico) Puerto Rican | 18 |
| 16 | Patricia Mercado | Sacramento, California | (Mexico) Mexican | 28 |
| 17 | Patty Contreras | New York City | (Dominican Republic) Dominican | 22 |
| 18 | Ronald Martínez | Miami, Florida | (Venezuela) Venezuelan | 27 |
| 19 | Soledad Sosa | Houston, Texas | (Mexico) Mexican | 26 |
| 20 | Sunel Molina | Dallas, Texas | (Cuba) Cuban | 19 |

* Age was taken at the beginning of the contest (2006)

== Weekly shows ==
The weekly shows began on February 11, 2006, and are held at the Centro de Bellas Artes of Caguas. Each presentation opens with a huge dance/sing number where all the contestants participate.

Before each presentation, contestants are interviewed by host Yuri, while they present some of the things that happened the preceding week. After the contestants presentation, the three judges evaluate his performance. Guest judges might be brought from time to time.

=== Quarter-finals ===
==== First show: February 11 ====
The songs performed during the first show were:

| # | Contestant | Song title | Original performer |
|---|---|---|---|
| 1 | Marlon Fernández | "Llorarás" | Oscar D'León |
| 1 | Edwin Gómez | "Llorarás" | Oscar D'León |
| 2 | Mary Ann Acevedo | "El Frío de Tu Adiós" | Olga Tañon |
| 2 | Jenilca Giusti | "El Frío de Tu Adiós" | Olga Tañon |
| 3 | Patricia Mercado | "La Pareja Ideal" | Marisela and Marco Antonio Solís |
| 3 | Elionaid Iñiguez | "La Pareja Ideal" | Marisela and Marco Antonio Solís |
| 4 | Ediberto Carmenatty | "Todo el Año" | Obie Bermúdez |
| 5 | Josué Muñoz | "Que Seas Feliz" | Luis Miguel |
| 6 | Soledad Sosa | "Víveme" | Laura Pausini |
| 6 | Melanie Figueroa | "Víveme" | Laura Pausini |
| 7 | Gustavo Gutiérrez | "A Medio Vivir" | Ricky Martin |
| 8 | Patty Contreras | "El Me Mintió" | Amanda Miguel |
| 9 | José Barraza | "Bulería" | David Bisbal |
| 10 | Helen Ochoa | "Algo Más" | La Quinta Estación |
| 10 | Brigitte Dávila | "Algo Más" | La Quinta Estación |
| 11 | Ronald Martínez | "Te Conozco Bien" | Marc Anthony |
| 11 | Francisco Salicrup | "Te Conozco Bien" | Marc Anthony |
| 12 | Arquímedes González | "Sin Miedo a Nada" | Alex Ubago |
| 12 | Guadalupe Castro | "Sin Miedo a Nada" | Alex Ubago |
| 13 | Sunel Molina | "Solo Otra Vez" | Celine Dion |

The two threatened competitors of the night were: Guadalupe Castro and Sunel Molina.

==== Second show: February 18 ====
The songs performed during the second show were:

| # | Contestant | Song title | Original performer |
|---|---|---|---|
| 1 | Marlon Fernández | "Yo Sí Me Enamoré" | Huey Dunbar |
| 1 | Francisco Salicrup | "Yo Sí Me Enamoré" | Huey Dunbar |
| 2 | Arquímides González | "Pueden Decir" | Gilberto Santa Rosa |
| 2 | Edwin Gómez | "Pueden Decir" | Gilberto Santa Rosa |
| 3 | Mary Ann Acevedo | "Amar Sin Ser Amada" | Thalía |
| 3 | Brigitte Dávila | "Amar Sin Ser Amada" | Thalía |
| 4 | Jenilca Giusti | "Simplemente Amigos" | Ana Gabriel |
| 4 | Melanie Figueroa | "Simplemente Amigos" | Ana Gabriel |
| 5 | José Barraza | "Nada Es Para Siempre" | Luis Fonsi |
| 5 | Sunel Molina | "Nada Es Para Siempre" | Luis Fonsi |
| 6 | Patty Contreras | "Sin El" | Pandora |
| 6 | Soledad Sosa | "Sin El" | Pandora |
| 6 | Patricia Mercado | "Sin El" | Pandora |
| 7 | Helen Ochoa | "La Cigarra" | Linda Ronstadt |
| 8 | Elionaid Iñiguez | "Perfume de Gardenias" | Alejandro Fernández |
| 9 | Ronald Martínez | "Noviembre Sin Tí" | Reik |
| 9 | Ediberto Carmenatty | "Noviembre Sin Tí" | Reik |
| 9 | Josué Muñoz | "Noviembre Sin Tí" | Reik |
| 10 | Gustavo Gutiérrez | "La Tortura" | Shakira and Alejandro Sanz |
| 10 | Guadalupe Castro | "La Tortura" | Shakira and Alejandro Sanz |

Guadalupe Castro was selected by the audience to leave the competition, while Sunel Molina got another chance to stay in the show.

The judges harshly criticized Guadalupe and Gustavo's performance of "La Tortura". Hence, Gustavo was threatened to leave the show together with ???.

==== Third show: February 25 ====
The songs performed during the third show were:

| # | Contestant | Song title | Original performer |
|---|---|---|---|
| 1 | Marlon Fernández | "Valió La Pena" | Marc Anthony |
| 1 | Ediberto Carmenatty | "Valió La Pena" | Marc Anthony |
| 2 | Patty Contreras | "Como la Abeja al Panal" | Juan Luis Guerra |
| 2 | Edwin Gómez | "Como la Abeja al Panal" | Juan Luis Guerra |
| 3 | Arquímides González | "Si Tú Supieras" | Alejandro Fernández |
| 3 | Elionaid Iñiguez | "Si Tú Supieras" | Alejandro Fernández |
| 4 | Mary Ann Acevedo | "Como Tu Mujer" | Rocío Dúrcal |
| 4 | Patricia Mercado | "Como Tu Mujer" | Rocío Dúrcal |
| 5 | Jenilca Giusti | "Me Canse de ser la Otra" | La India |
| 5 | Soledad Sosa | "Me Canse de ser la Otra" | La India |
| 6 | José Barraza | "Amor del Bueno" | Reyli |
| 6 | Josué Muñoz | "Amor del Bueno" | Reyli |
| 7 | Helen Ochoa | "Loca" | Ana Bárbara |
| 7 | Melanie Figueroa | "Loca" | Ana Bárbara |
| 8 | Brigitte Dávila | "Con Los Ojos Cerrados" | Gloria Trevi |
| 9 | Ronald Martínez | "Penélope" | Diego Torres |
| 9 | Sunel Molina | "Penélope" | Diego Torres |
| 9 | Gustavo Gutiérrez | "Penélope" | Diego Torres |
| 10 | Francisco Salicrup | "Angel" | Jon Secada |

Gustavo Gutiérrez was selected by the audience to leave the competition, while ??? got another chance to stay in the show.

Elionaid Iñiguez and ??? were threatened to leave the competition.

| Contestant | Profile | Songs |
|---|---|---|
| Marlon Fernández | Age: 28; Lives: Miami, Florida; From: Cuba; WINNER | "Llorarás" (Oscar D'León); "Yo Sí Me Enamoré" (Huey Dunbar); "Valió La Pena" (Marc Anthony); "Kilómetros" (Sin Bandera); "Simplemente Amigos" (Amanda Miguel y Diego Verdaguer); "Yo Viviré" (Celia Cruz); "Preciosa" (Marc Anthony); "Escondidos" (Olga Tañon and Cristian Castro); "Que Levante La Mano" (Joseph Fonseca); "Si Tú Me Amaras" (Cristian Castro); "Te Olvidaré" (Alvaro Torres); "Contra La Corriente" (Marc Anthony); "Vida" (Marcos Llunas) |
| Patty Contreras | Age: 22; Lives: New York City; From: Dominican Republic | "El Me Mintió" (Amanda Miguel); "Sin El" (Pandora); "Como La Abeja al Panal" (Juan Luis Guerra); "Bandolero" (Olga Tañon); "Simplemente Amigos" (Amanda Miguel y Diego Verdaguer); "Amiga Mía" (Yuri); "Soy Lo Prohibido" (Alicia Villarreal); "Si Tu Eres Mi Hombre" (La India); "Como Una Loba" (Valeria Lynch); "Echame a Mí La Culpa" (Rocío Dúrcal); "Devórame Otra Vez" (Azúcar Moreno); "Seňora" (Rocío Jurado); "Madre" |
| Arquímides González | Age: 19; Lives: Bayamón, Puerto Rico; From: Puerto Rico | "Sin Miedo a Nada" (Alex Ubago); "Pueden Decir" (Gilberto Santa Rosa); "Si Tú Supieras" (Alejandro Fernández); "Kilómetros" (Sin Bandera); "La Bikina" (Luis Miguel); "Livin' la Vida Loca" (Ricky Martin); "El Triste" (José José); "Me Has Echado Al Olvido" (José Feliciano); "Es Por Tí" (Jon Secada); "Dueño De Tí" (José Luis Rodríguez "El Puma"); "Mucho Corazón" (Luis Miguel); "Quimbara" (Celia Cruz); "A Mi Manera" (Bobby Cruz & Richie Ray) |
| Mary Ann Acevedo | Age: 18; Lives: Cabo Rojo, Puerto Rico; From: Puerto Rico | "El Frío de Tu Adiós" (Olga Tañon); "Amar Sin Ser Amada" (Thalía); "Como Tu Mujer" (Rocío Dúrcal); "Bandolero" (Olga Tañon); "Vivo Por Ella" (Andrea Bocelli and Marta Sánchez); "Contigo En La Distancia" (Christina Aguilera); "El Hombre Que Yo Amo" (Myriam Hernández); "Si No Te Hubiera Conocido" (Luis Fonsi and Christina Aguilera); "Que Ganas De No Verte Nunca Más" (Lupita D'Alessio); "Héroe" (Mariah Carey); "A Que Vuelve" (Gisselle); "Si Tu No Estas Aquí" (Rosana); "Tu si que sabes amar" (Rocío Dúrcal); "Fuera de mi vida" (Valeria Lynch) |
| Jenilca Giusti | Age: 24; Lives: Orlando, Florida; From: Puerto Rico; Eliminated: May 6, 2006 | "El Frío de Tu Adiós" (Olga Tañon); "Simplemente Amigos" (Ana Gabriel); "Me Canse De Ser La Otra" (La India); "Quitame Ese Hombre" (Pilar Montenegro); "Herida" (Myriam Hernández); "Para Darte Mi Vida" (Milly Quezada y Elvis Crespo); "Refugio de Amor" (Chayanne and Vanessa L. Williams); "Escondidos" (Olga Tañon and Cristian Castro); "Como Si No Nos Hubieramos Amado" (Laura Pausini); "Tú Sin Mí" (Ednita Nazario); "Entre La Noche y el Día" (Olga Tañon); Qué será de ti |
| José Barraza | Age: 21; Lives: Fresno, California; From: Mexico; Eliminated: May 6, 2006 | "Bulería" (David Bisbal); "Nada Es Para Siempre" (Luis Fonsi); "Amor del Bueno" (Reyli); "La Cima del Cielo" (Ricardo Montaner); "Solo Quedate en Silencio" (RBD); "Ahora Quién" (Marc Anthony); "Lo Mejor De Mí" (Cristian Castro); "Si No Te Hubiera Conocido" (Luis Fonsi and Christina Aguilera); "Volver, Volver" (Vicente Fernández); "Un Siglo Sin Tí" (Chayanne); "Amor, Amor, Amor" (Luis Miguel); "Azul" (Cristian Castro); "Por Una Mujer" (Luis Fonsi) |
| Patricia Mercado | Age: 28; Lives: Sacramento, California; From: Mexico; Eliminated: April 29, 2006 | "La Pareja Ideal" (Marisela and Marco Antonio Solís); "Sin El" (Pandora); "Como Tu Mujer"; "Más Grande Que Grande" (Ednita Nazario); "La Carcacha" (Selena); "Entre El Mar y una Estrella" (Thalía); "Daría" (La Quinta Estación); "Mi Eterno Amor Secreto" (Olga Tañon); "Ay, Amor" (Ana Gabriel); "Te Quedó Grande La Yegua" (Alicia Villarreal); "Maldita Primavera" (Yuri) |
| Helen Ochoa | Age: 20; Lives: Fresno, California; From: Mexico; Eliminated: April 29, 2006 | "Algo Más" (La Quinta Estación); "La Cigarra" (Linda Ronstadt); "Loca" (Ana Bárbara); "Quitame Ese Hombre" (Pilar Montenegro); "Solo Quedate en Silencio" (RBD); "Amiga Mía" (Yuri); "Daría" (La Quinta Estación); "Si Tu Eres Mi Hombre" (La India); "Jamás Te Dejaré" (Rocío Dúrcal); "La Llamada" (Selena); "Esta Vez" (Alicia Villarreal) |
| Brigitte Dávila | Age: 19; Lives: San Juan, Puerto Rico; From: Puerto Rico; Eliminated: April 22, 2006 | "Algo Más" (La Quinta Estación); "Amar Sin Ser Amada" (Thalía); "Con Los Ojos Cerrados" (Gloria Trevi); "Más Grande Que Grande" (Ednita Nazario); "Solo Quedate en Silencio" (RBD); "Te Quiero Tanto o Más Que Ayer" (Monchy y Alexandra); "El Hombre Que Yo Amo (Myriam Hernández); "Escapémonos" (Marc Anthony and Jennifer Lopez); "Niña" (La Quinta Estación); "Tu Amor" (Olga Tañón); "Sálvame" (RBD) |
| Edwin Gómez | Age: 26; Lives: New York City; From: Dominican Republic; Eliminated: April 22, 2006 | "Llorarás" (Oscar D'León); "Pueden Decir" (Gilberto Santa Rosa); "Como la Abeja al Panal" (Juan Luis Guerra); "Camisa Negra" (Juanes); "Y Tu Te Vas" (Chayanne); "Canta Corazón" (Alejandro Fernández); "Que Locura Fue" (Eddie Santiago); "Amores Como El Nuestro" (Jerry Rivera); "Dile a Ella" (Víctor Manuelle); "Suavemente" (Elvis Crespo); "Amor Mío, No Te Vayas" |
| Ronald Martínez | Age: 27; Lives: Miami, Florida; From: Venezuela; Eliminated: April 15, 2006 | "Te Conozco Bien" (Marc Anthony); "Noviembre Sin Tí" (Reik); "Penélope" (Diego Torres); "Avemaría" (David Bisbal); "La Bikina" (Luis Miguel); "Para Darte Mi Vida" (Milly Quezada and Elvis Crespo); "Lo Mejor De Mí" (Cristian Castro); "Escapémonos" (Marc Anthony and Jennifer Lopez); "Hasta Ayer" (Marc Anthony); "Te Amo" (Franco De Vita) |
| Sunel Molina | Age: 19; Lives: Dallas, Texas; From: Cuba; Eliminated: April 15, 2006 | "Solo Otra Vez" (Celine Dion); "Nada Es Para Siempre" (Luis Fonsi); "Penélope" (Diego Torres); "El Rey" (Luis Miguel); "Vivo Por Ella" (Andrea Bocelli and Marta Sánchez); "Yo Viviré" (Celia Cruz); "El Triste" (José José); "Mi Eterno Amor Secreto" (Olga Tañon); "Me Voy a Quitar Del Medio" (Vicente Fernández); "Déjame Llorar" (Ricardo Montaner) |
| Francisco Salicrup | Age: 24; Lives: Boston, Massachusetts; From: Dominican Republic/Puerto Rico; Eliminated: April 8, 2006 | "Te Conozco Bien" (Marc Anthony); "Yo Sí Me Enamoré" (Huey Dunbar); "Angel" (Jon Secada); "Dos Locos" (Monchy y Alexandra); "Hay Otra En Tu Lugar" (Pablo Montero); "Ahora Quien" (Marc Anthony); "Que Locura Fue" (Eddie Santiago); "Hasta Que Me Olvides" (Luis Miguel); "Tocando Fondo" (Kalimba) |
| Ediberto Carmenatty | Age: 18; Lives: Boston, Massachusetts; From: Boston, Massachusetts/Puerto Rico; Eliminated: March 31, 2006 (left for medical reasons) | "Todo el Año" (Obie Bermúdez); "Noviembre Sin Tí" (Reik); "Valió La Pena" (Marc Anthony); "La Cima del Cielo" (Ricardo Montaner); "Hay Otra En Tu Lugar" (Pablo Montero); "Canta Corazón" (Alejandro Fernández); "Refugio de Amor" (Chayanne and Vanessa L. Williams) |
| Soledad Sosa | Age: 26; Lives: Houston, Texas; From: Mexico; Eliminated: March 19, 2006 (abandoned the competition) | "Víveme" (Laura Pausini); "Sin El" (Pandora); "Me Canse De Ser La Otra" (La India); "Dos Locos" (Monchy y Alexandra); "La Carcacha" (Selena); "Cucurrucucú Paloma" |
| Josué Muñoz | Age: 22; Lives: Los Angeles, California; From: Mexico; Eliminated: March 18, 2006 | "Que Seas Feliz" (Luis Miguel); "Noviembre Sin Tí" (Reik); "Amor del Bueno" (Reyli); "El Rey" (Luis Miguel); "Solo Quedate en Silencio" (RBD); "Te Quiero Tanto o Más Que Ayer" (Monchy y Alexandra) |
| Melanie Figueroa | Age: 18; Lives: San Juan, Puerto Rico; From: Puerto Rico; Eliminated: March 11, 2006 | "Víveme" (Laura Pausini); "Simplemente Amigos" (Ana Gabriel); "Loca" (Ana Bárbara); "Bandolero" (Olga Tañon); "Pero Me Acuerdo De Tí" (Christina Aguilera) |
| Elionaid Iñiguez | Age: 22; Lives: San Antonio, Texas; From: Mexico; Eliminated: March 4, 2006 | "La Pareja Ideal" (Marisela and Marco Antonio Solís); "Perfume de Gardenias" (Alejandro Fernández); "Si Tú Supieras" (Alejandro Fernández); "Camisa Negra" (Juanes) |
| Gustavo Gutiérrez | Age: 24; Lives: Chicago, Illinois; From: Mexico; Eliminated: February 25, 2006 | "A Medio Vivir" (Ricky Martin); "La Tortura" (Shakira and Alejandro Sanz); "Penélope" (Diego Torres) |
| Guadalupe Castro | Age: 22; Lives: Tucson, Arizona; From: Mexico; Eliminated: February 18, 2006 | "Sin Miedo a Nada" (Alex Ubago); "La Tortura" (Shakira and Alejandro Sanz) |

=== Eliminations ===
Each week, based on the contestants performances, the judges threaten a maximum of three contestants to abandon the competition. In the first weeks, the professors "save" one of them based on their week's performance during rehearses. The remaining threatened contestants are then subject to the evaluation of the public during the next week, where the audience has the right to vote for who they want to stay or leave. The results are announced in the next show.

== Con tus Estrellas en Vivo (2006) ==
Con tus Estrellas en Vivo

Compilation album by various artists
- Released: June 2006
- Recorded: 2006
- Genre: Latin pop, pop
- Length: 26:14
- Label: Acisum Group, Univision
- Producer: Acisum Group

Objetivo Fama chronology
| Con un Sueño (2005) | ''Con tus Estrellas en Vivo'' (2006) | Las Voces de tus Estrellas (2007) |

Singles from Con tus Estrellas en Vivo
- 1. "Kilometros" Released: May 2006

Con tus Estrellas en Vivo is the third compilation album from the third season of Objetivo Fama. The first and only single of this album was "Kilometros", a song of the duo Sin Bandera, interpreted here by Arquimides Gonzales and Marlon Fernández (winner of this season).

=== Track listing ===
1. "El Triste" - (Sunel & Arquímides González) - 2:47
2. "El Hombre que yo Amo" - (Briggitte & Mary Ann Acevedo) - 3:01
3. "Kilometros" - (Marlon & Arquímides González) - 2:48
4. "Preciosa" - (Marlon Fernández) - 2:52
5. "Como abeja al panal" - (Patty & Edwin) - 2:40
6. "Ahora quien" - (Jose & Francisco) - 2:14
7. "Para darte mi vida" - (Ronald & Jenilca Giusti) - 2:48
8. "Todo el año" - (Ediberto) - 1:58
9. "Dile" - (All) - 2:29
10. "Nuestro Amor" - (All) - 3:26

=== Personnel ===
- Vocals – Objetivo Fama contestants
- Background vocals – Objetivo Fama contestants

==== Production ====
- Executive Producer: Ender J. Vega (Acisum Group), Soraya Sánchez
- Associates Producers: Angelo Torres,
- Pre-Production: Yamilín Rivera, Josema Hernandez-Centeno
- Recording studio: MAS AUDIO (Toa Baja, Puerto Rico)
- Mastering: Papo Sánchez
- Photography: Fabián Lira (Univision.com)
- Art Direction and design: Guillermo A. Alonso
- Fashion "Gurú": Karina Vélez
- Stylist & Makeup: Wanda Montes Salón

== Controversies ==
Some controversies that surfaced during the season.

- On April 1, 2006, it was announced that competitor Ediberto Carmenatty had to leave the competition for medical reasons. The reasons were loosely disclosed, but apparently Carmenatty was suffering from some sort of injury on his back and leg. This was particularly shocking to everybody because Carmenatty was both one of the strongest competitors of the show and one of the most loved by both his fellow competitors and the audience.
- Without a doubt, the biggest controversy so far is the elimination of strong competitor Soledad Sosa from the competition. On March 19, 2006, she decided to quit the competition and abandoned the house with her husband returning to Houston, Texas. Her parents have complained because they've never gotten along with him and have accused him of manipulating Sosa's decision. The production of the show has also inferred that there might be some legal repercussions to her decision because of the contract each contestant signed. Sosa was one of the best singers of the group, receiving always high evaluations from the judges and not being threatened in any of the shows.
- The attitude of some of the contestants has also rose some controversy. More notable were the issues surrounding Sunel Molina during the first weeks, where he argued with many of his fellow competitors and teachers for several reasons. Other contestants that have had problems because of their attitude have been Ronald Martínez and Francisco Salicrup.
- During the third or fourth week of the show, some of the male competitors were reprimanded by Lunna (the administrator of the house/studio) for not waking up early for rehearsals and classes. Some of the competitors reprimanded for this were Marlon Fernández, Edwin Gómez, Arquimides González and José Barraza.
- During the fourth week, it was also brought to attention the poor conditions in which most of the contestants had their rooms. This was shown in the weekly show because Francisco Salicrup complained about the hygiene of his friends.
- Some contestants, namely Josué Muñoz and Helen Ochoa, argued the judge's decisions to threaten them repeatedly in the early shows of the competition even implying that there might be favoritism to other contestants. Josué was eliminated on March 18, 2006.

== After the show ==
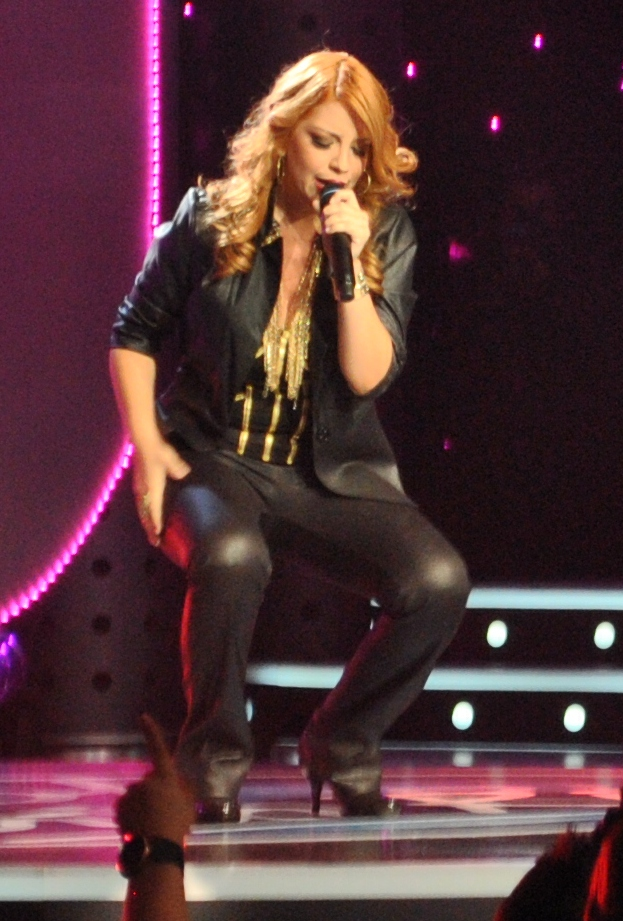
Mary Ann Acevedo

- Season winner Marlon Fernández released his first album titled Mi Sueño in 2006. The album features several songs written by Olga Tañon and a duet with La India. In 2008, he released his second album titled Homenaje a Juan Luis Guerra. He has been nominated to several Billboard Latin Music Awards as well as some Lo Nuestro Awards.
- Third finalist Arquímides González released his first album titled Mil Violines in early 2007.
- Fourth finalist Mary Ann Acevedo was the first contestant to release an album. Her self-titled album was released in mid-2006.
- Jenilca Giusti is about to release her first album and the first single is already on radio.
- Helen Ochoa released a project titled Dos Destinos in early 2007. This project was originally intended to be a dual project with fellow contestant Melanie Figueroa, but the latter dropped from it for health reasons.
- Gustavo Gutiérrez, boyfriend of fellow competitor Jenilca Giusti, is taking acting courses and has already received several offers in Miami and Venezuela.
- Ediberto Carmenatty, Arquímides González, and Mary Ann Acevedo in company of some of the other contestants of Objetivo Fama's 5th Season are now part of a group called "Los Favoritos" and after having a successful show in CBA are having a concert on the Roberto Clemente Coliseum.
