= Llegaste Tú =

Llegaste Tú (English: You Arrived) may refer to:

- Llegaste Tú, an album by Ray Sepúlveda (1994)
- "Llegaste Tú", a song by Mary Ann Acevedo from her album Cántale a tu Bebé (2009)
- "Llegaste Tú", a song by CNCO (2018)
- "Llegaste Tú", a song by Huey Dunbar from his album Music for My Peoples (2003)
- "Llegaste Tú", a song by Luis Fonsi from his album 8 (2014)
- "Llegaste Tú", a song by Jesse & Joy from their album Esta Es Mi Vida (2006)
- "Llegaste Tú", a song by Jessy J from her album True Love (2009)
- "Llegaste Tú", a song by Sofía Reyes from her album Louder! (2016)
- "Llegaste Tú", a song by Tito El Bambino from his album Invicto (2012)
- "Llegaste Tú", a song by Joan & O'Neill

== See also ==
- "Y Llegaste Tú", a song by La Banda el Recodo
- "Y Llegaste Tú", a song by Sin Bandera from their eponymous album
