= Yo Soy la Bomba =

Yo Soy la ¡Bomba!

Studio album by Ashley Colón
- Released: April 29, 1997
- Genre: Merengue
- Length: 34:29
- Label: Sony Tropical
- Producer: Guillermo Torres

Ashley Colón chronology
Yo Soy la ¡Bomba! (1997)	Yo Soy La Reina (1997)

Singles from Yo Soy la ¡Bomba!
- 1. "El Truco" Released: 1997; 2. "Ese Moreno" Released: 1997

Yo Soy la ¡Bomba! is the debut solo studio album by Puerto Rican merenguero Ashley Colón, literally meaning "I'm the Bomb" in Spanish. It was released on April 29, 1997, via Sony Tropical. Production was handled by Guillermo Torres. The album peaked at number 14 on the US Billboard Tropical Albums chart. Two singles were released from the album: "El Truco", which peaked at No. 32 on the Hot Latin Songs chart, No. 16 on the Latin Pop Airplay chart and No. 7 on the Tropical Airplay chart, and "Ese Moreno", which made it to No. 19 on the Tropical Airplay chart.

== Track listing ==
No.	Title	Writer(s)	Length
1.	"Yo Soy la Bomba"	Guillermo Torres	4:40
2.	"Ese Moreno"	Torres	4:25
3.	"Mi Novio Se Curo"		4:30
4.	"El Truco"	Ynercido Dilone	4:23
5.	"Yo Tengo un Ritmo"	Víctor García	4:13
6.	"Donde Estas Corazon"	Shakira Isabel Mebarak Ripoll; Luis Fernando Ochoa	4:00
7.	"Mujer de un Solo Hombre"	Carlos David	4:20
8.	"Secretaria"	Juan Carlos Calderón	3:58
Total length:			34:29

== Charts ==
Weekly chart performance for Yo Soy la ¡Bomba!
Chart (1997)	Peak position
US Tropical Albums (Billboard)	14
