= Grupo KAOS =

Puerto Rican merengue group of the 1990s

Grupo KAOS was a Puerto Rican merengue music band of the 1990s. The band enjoyed some success in Puerto Rico, Central and South America and the Dominican Republic.

== Members ==
KAOS' line-up always consisted of four members, but the band went through several line-up changes. Two of their notable members were former Menudo singer Charlie Masso and Chicago-born Guillermo Torres.
