= Jenilca Giusti =

Puerto Rican singer

- Also known as: Jenilca
- Born: Jenilca Franchesca Giusti; August 21, 1981 (age 44); Bayamón, Puerto Rico
- Genres: Pop, Latin, Latin pop
- Occupations: Singer, songwriter, actress, model
- Years active: 1999–present
- Labels: Araiza Records (2008–present); G-Music Entert. (2007–2008); DreamWorks
- Website: Jenilca's Manager Website

Jenilca Franchesca Giusti is a Puerto Rican singer, songwriter and actress commonly known as Jenilca. Jenilca was a participant of the third season of Objetivo Fama and a principal actress in the Broadway musicals Fame and Grease, which were presented at the CBA Luis A. Ferré in San Juan, Puerto Rico.

== Biography ==
=== Early life and career ===
Jenilca Giusti was born on August 21, 1981, in Bayamón, Puerto Rico. At the age of 8, she moved to Daytona, Florida with her family where her musical career began to flourish. She later studied "Musical Education" at the University of Valencia.

She began participating in musicals such as Annie and Joseph and the Technicolor Dreamcoat. Her style and talent has attracted the attention of magazines such as Pop Star Magazine and companies such as "Cingular Wireless", who made her "Girl Cingular" in 2003.

Jenilca appeared in large venues in her short career; some of these places were in the BB Mat Tour, at SeaWorld in Orlando, Florida in 2000, Bongos Cuban Café, San Juan Nights "Wet 'n' Wild" on Telemundo in 2005 and 2006, Fiesta Orange Street from 2004 to 2005, Fiesta Medina in Orlando, Florida in 2004 and more have earned her acclaim.

Jenilca has sung with many famous musicians such as Gisselle, Jon Secada, Tito Nieves and El Gran Combo de Puerto Rico and numerous others. In 2002, she participated in the "Protagonistas de la Musica" competition, finishing among the 50 finalists. This led to the audition in the third season of the "Objetivo Fama" in 2006 where she finished 5th.

Her participation as one of the protagonists in the musical "Fame" in August 2006 at the Centro de Bellas Artes Luis A. Ferré in San Juan, the most prestigious stage of Puerto Rico under the leadership of Sonia Valentín and production of Alba Nydia Díaz, earned her critical acclamation both from the press and the public who attended for two consecutive weeks to witness this theatrical performance. Alba and Sonia was the impact of performance Jenilca in the music show that she has returned to offer the protagonist of another famous musical, "Grease".

=== 2000–2006: Solid Harmonie and Objetivo Fama ===
Jenilca joined the girl group Solid HarmoniE in 2000 after the departure of Mariama and Melissa. She was with the group when they were recording their second studio album. However, since the album was never released, Jenilca has never been officially recognized as a Solid HarmoniE member; for that reason, she could participate on the Objetivo Fama reality show.

Jenilca auditioned for the third season of Objetivo Fama in Orlando, Florida. On May 6, 2006, she became the fourth of the 6 finalists to be voted off the show, finishing the competition in fifth place.

==== Objetivo Fama performances ====
- "El Frío de Tu Adiós" (Olga Tañon)
- "Simplemente Amigos" (Ana Gabriel)
- "Me Canse De Ser La Otra" (La India)
- "Quitame Ese Hombre" (Yolandita Monje)
- "Herida" (Myriam Hernández)
- "Para Darte Mi Vida" (Milly Quezada y Elvis Crespo)
- "Refugio de Amor" (Chayanne and Vanessa L. Williams)
- "Escondidos" (Olga Tañon and Cristian Castro)
- "Como Si No Nos Hubieramos Amado" (Laura Pausini)
- "Tú Sin Mí" (Ednita Nazario)
- "Entre La Noche y el Día" (Olga Tañon)

=== 2007–present: Jenilca and Second studio album ===
The major music labels, have approached her to hire and produce their albums under their record label. At the moment, Jenilca is considering several offers while continuing to expand her repertoire, including 16 unrecorded songs. The single, "Enamorada de Ti", of her first album (Jenilca), is frequently requested for broadcast on the Puerto Rican radio.

On July 5, 2008, Jenilca made her first presentation in a gay discothèque named "STARZ". When interviewed she noted that the "gay community has supported her career" and the "music in general".

In an interview granted by Jenilca late 2008, she said that on 2009, to about the summer or fall, she published her second studio album worldwide. In mid-May, was published, which until now could be the name of the second studio album of Jenilca Giusti, it maybe is "La Indiciplinada"; the launch date and the first single, is a simple secret to make it more intrigue and mystery of what will be your album. At present she is in a recording break, and then enter fully and to conclude with her new musical project. The second studio album of Jenilca maybe release on 2010.

== Discography ==
=== Studio albums ===
- 2007: Jenilca

=== Other albums ===
- 2006: Con tus Estrellas En Vivo

== Special presentations ==
Jenilca has remained active in the musical atmosphere and has been invited to participate in major events that have taken place in Puerto Rico. Her presence at the "Concierto ASSMCA" in Old San Juan, "Concierto Navideño... Objetivo Fama" in Guaynabo, Puerto Rico, "10K Familiar de El Nuevo Dia" has led to media interest in featuring her in their publications and programs.

She was a featured performer in "Revive la Musica" Banco Popular, cooperating with such celebrities as Ricky Martin, Paulina Rubio, Gilberto Santa Rosa, Víctor Manuelle, Ednita Nazario and numerous others. Jenilca also cooperated with many Hispanic musicians such as Gisselle, Jon Secada, Tito Nieves and El Gran Combo de Puerto Rico.

She had the opportunity to work with big names in the music industry, such as Billy Chapin and his partner Bryan Bennett, largely responsible for the Backstreet Boys. She worked with Andy Goldmark, composer and producer of artists like Elton John, Natalie Cole, Patti LaBelle and Michael Bolton. She also cooperated with Mark Goff, the head vocalist of groups like Backstreet Boys and N'Sync.

=== Musical plays ===
Year	Title	Role
1990	Annie	Annie
1991	Joseph and the Technicolor Dreamcoat	Special Role
2006	Fama: El Musical	Serena Katz
2007	Grease: El Musical de tu Vida	Sandy Dumbrowski

== See also ==
- List of Puerto Ricans
