= Melanie Maher =

Puerto Rican musician (born 1987)

- Born: Melanie Figueroa Solis; July 22, 1987 (age 39); San Juan, Puerto Rico
- Origin: Puerto Rican
- Genres: Pop, Latin, Latin pop
- Occupations: Singer, model, actress, host, event producer
- Years active: 2001–present
- Website: Melanie Maher's Facebook Page

Melanie Figueroa Solis (born July 22, 1987) is a Puerto Rican singer, model, actress, host, event producer, and a contestant of the third season of Objetivo Fama and one of the leading actresses in the Broadway revival musical Grease: El Musical de tu Vida, which was presented at the Centro de Bellas Artes Luis A. Ferre in San Juan, Puerto Rico; here at the CBA, Figueroa had a special participation, singing in the revival musical Hairspray: El Musical, at its world premiere in Spanish.

== Biography ==
=== Early life ===
Melanie Figueroa Solis was born on July 22, 1987, in San Juan, Puerto Rico, to Puerto Rican parents, Pedro Juan Figueroa (Actor) and Maria Elena Solis (Professional cyclist and banker). Figueroa describes herself as a young determined woman. She also considers herself to be romantic, positive and a fighter. Of the zodiacal sign of Cancer and loving ballad, Figueroa is a self-proclaimed fanatic of the music of "Boricuas" like Robi "Draco" Rosa and Ednita Nazario for their unique styles of singing and total dedication in the scenarios. She showed interest in music and arts from a very young age going so far as hiding in her room to practice singing. In 2003, Figueroa received her high school in Cupey Maria Montessori School, where later in 2005, graduated to go to college life. After successfully entering to the "Universidad del Sagrado Corazón" in Santurce, Puerto Rico, Figueroa graduated from the area of Production and Event Marketing.

=== Rising Star ===
Figueroa originally started out in musical atmosphere forming part of the Spanish rock band called "Anamú". She was only 14 years old at the time and her tenure with the group allowed her perform publicly around the island of Puerto Rico as the lead singer of the band. She later developed her modeling skills taking formal modeling classes and continued working on her music skills attending the Conservatory of Music of Puerto Rico.

=== Against Lupus ===
During one of the galas "Objetivo Fama" in 2006, Figueroa let the public known about her constant struggle with the Lupus disease. Among her hardships include being hospitalized several times, including one in which blood drives for the singer were organized.

== Runway Model ==
In 2005, her training as a model enabled her to take part on the Miss Puerto Rico Teen and the "Elite Super Model of Puerto Rico".

Now in 2009, Figueroa was selected as a candidate for the beauty contest "La Cara de Imagen 2009", created by the "Imagén" magazine of Puerto Rico. She is one of the 125 participating candidates for the new look of the magazine, appearing on the cover and an endless array of prizes. The finalists will be chosen by voting via the Internet at the official website of the magazine.

== Grow as singer ==
=== Objetivo Fama ===
In November 2005, Figueroa decided to audition to "Objetivo Fama" in Bayamon, Puerto Rico. Not telling her parents until the day before said auditions she was one of only four Puerto Ricans who made the cut and made it all the way to the finals of the competition. Figueroa was in the competition until March 11, 2006 when was eliminated by the judges. Helen Ochoa released a project titled Dos Destinos in early 2007. This project was originally intended to be a dual project with Figueroa, but the latter dropped from it for health reasons.

Objetivo Fama performances

Songs performed by Figueroa in the reality show in 2006:

- "Víveme" (Laura Pausini)
- "Simplemente Amigos" (Ana Gabriel)
- "Loca" (Ana Bárbara)
- "Bandolero" (Olga Tañon)
- "Pero Me Acuerdo De Tí" (Christina Aguilera)

== Broadway musicals ==
As we know Figueroa took a leading role as principal actress in the Broadway revival musical Grease: El Musical de tu Vida, which was presented at the Centro de Bellas Artes Luis A. Ferre in San Juan, Puerto Rico and also here at the CBA, Figueroa took a special participation, singing in the revival musical Hairspray: El Musical, at its world premiere in Spanish, in all of this musicals, Figueroa worked with her old friends of Objetivo Fama. On September, she will be one of the principal characters in "Rent: The Musical". Melanie as "Mimi Marquez", will be present at the CBA in San Juan, Puerto Rico.

Musical plays:

- 2007: Grease: El Musical de tu Vida as "Jan"
- 2008: Hairspray: El Musical as "Dynamite"
- 2009: Rent: The Musical as "Mimi Márquez"

== Debuts as Radio host ==
Now on 2009, Figueroa is now working like a Radio host in Puerto Rico with her father Pedro Juan Figueroa, in the radio station "Radio Oro 92.5 – FM". The radio program's called "A tu Salud", it go on air, all Friday (6 – 7 pm).
