= Imagen (magazine) =

Puerto Rican fashion magazine

- Cover for the issue dated February and March 2020, featuring Ricky Martin
- Editor: Annette Oliveras Camacho
- Categories: Celebrity, fashion, beauty
- Frequency: Monthly
- Founded: 1986
- Company: Latin Media House LLC
- Country: Puerto Rico
- Based in: San Juan
- Language: Spanish
- Website: Imagen
- ISSN: 0890-6548

Imagen is a Spanish language monthly women's fashion magazine published in San Juan, Puerto Rico.

== Profile ==
Imagen was founded in 1986. The magazine is printed monthly by Casiano Communications. The headquarters is in San Juan. It is Puerto Rico's leading fashion magazine geared to women. Some celebrities that have graced its cover in recent years include Carlos Arroyo, Denise Quiñones, and Cynthia Olavarría to name a few. The current editor-in-chief is Annette Oliveras Camacho.

On May 30, 2007, a Central Florida edition of the magazine was launched to cater to growing Puerto Rican population in that region of state. With offices in Orlando, Florida, this new edition is expected to grow significantly in their readership numbers in upcoming years. The current editor-in-chief of this edition is María Isabel Sanquírico.
