= Lucecita Benítez =

Puerto Rican musician

Lucecita
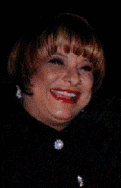
- Born: Luz Esther Benítez Rosado; July 22, 1942 (age 84); Bayamón, Puerto Rico
- Other name: La Voz Nacional de Puerto Rico
- Occupation: Singer
- Years active: 1964–present
- Musical career
- Genre: Puerto Rican folk music and Nova Trova
- Instrument: Vocals

Luz Esther Benítez Rosado (born July 22, 1942), also known as Lucecita, is a Puerto Rican singer, part of the country's new wave popular music. Born in Bayamon, a large city in Puerto Rico, she participated in amateur radio shows. Her early success earned her the nicknames "La Reina de la Juventud" and "La Reina de la Nueva Ola". In April 1969, when Benítez won the Festival de la Cancion Latina (Festival of the Latin Song) in Mexico. Her rendition of "Genesis" received the highest points (223) in the festival. Between 1969 and 1990, Benítez was the local artist to cover most music genres, from traditional Puerto Rican music to rock, she played a role in the Puerto Rico Symphony Orchestra's early pop music performances.

== Entertainment career ==
=== Early career ===
Interested in singing, composing, dancing and playing the guitar from a young age, she quickly developed an interest in songs that were romantic and had a social message. Regarded as a modern singer and early in her career a notable member of the nueva canción movement, Benítez began performing in television and radio shows early in her life, with her first artistic appearance taking place when she was nine years old. Travelling abroad to New York, she recorded her first productions, before gaining popularity in her native Puerto Rico during the early 1960s. She was featured at the Teenager's Matinee along other youth performers, signing at locales like the Hiram Bithorn Stadium. Benítez joined Leonor Constanzo at Caribelandia, a show held at Santo Domingo, Dominican Republic that became a hit after it aired through Radio Santo Domingo. She continued performing there for a month. By August 1964, she was regarded as the "revelation of the year" and lauded for her scenic presence. In September 1964, Benítez's single "Un Lugar Para Los Dos" climbed to the first place in the local hit parade. The song "Ya No Te Puedo Olvidar" was released along this song and also gathered airtime, reaching number 8. Lucecita Benítez, along Chucho Avellanet and Al Zeppy were brought in to WKAQ-TV to appear in a segment known as El club canta la juventud. When she was starting, Benítez acted along Gladys Rodríguez in Como se llama esta flor. She also appeared in the telenovela La Loba along Johanna Rosaly. When Felipe Pirela came to Puerto Rico, she performed along him at theaters. Caribelandia was brought to Puerto Rico by Tommy Muñiz, who had it aired through WAPA-TV, WOLE-TV and WSUR-TV on September 29, 1964. By November, both of her singles remained in the Puerto Rico Hit Parade.

In February 1965, Benítez traveled to Venezuela for the first time, earning positive reviews from the newspaper La República. An LP record released in 1965 included three hits, "Entonces él me besó", "Dile" and "Yo te Perdono". In June 1965, Benítez won La Estrella De Oro, an award given to the most popular foreign artists in Venezuela. She performed at the Fiestas Patronales at Cidra and Comerío,drawing crowds. Meanwhile, Avellanet released the cheek in tongue single "Lucecita", a comedic homage. Benítez joined Myrta Silva's musical titled Vida Latina Extravaganza, starring opposite Teddy Trinidad. In August 1965, she headlined Teenage Command Performance along Julio Ángel. Benítez also participated in miscellaneous events, such as the inauguration of the Country Club Shopping Plaza and entertaining the foreign athletes during the Central American and Caribbean Games. In September 1965, Benítez released "Vete con Ella", "El Club del Clan", "El Rebelde" and "Vuelve Ya", all of which made the Puerto Rico Hit Parade.

In October 1965, she tied with Sonia Noemí in a musical debate held at New York. A cover of Duo Dinámico's "Esos Ojitos Negros" was released by Benítez during the summer of 1966, becoming a hit. This was followed by the LP "Olé Lucecita!", which became the top selling album on the island led by the single "Al Lado". She was part of an homage to Rafael Hernández Marín held at the Festival Anual de la Música Puertorriqueña. In November 1966, Benítez acted along Braulio Castillo and Arturo Correa in the theatre production Operación Tiburón at Teatro Modelo and Teatro Matienzo. She received an homage from the Asociación Recreativa de Vista Alegre, in her native town. Benítez’s music was featured in the film Machuchal: Agente "O" en New York, a film that debuted in December 1966. In February 1967, she joined more than a dozen artists and groups participated in an event for actress Laura Martell after she underwent cardiac surgery. In March, Benítez traveled to Chicago. Benítez won the Yunque de Oro Award at the Popularity Contest sponsored by Producciones Rabelo & Ledesma.

Benítez continued making appearances in television, being featured in programs like Canta la Juventud and El Show de las 12. She was among the artists sponsored by Banco Popular de Puerto Rico and Rexach Construction Co. for their activities. While Canta la Juventud continued its run at Telemundo, Benítez and Avellanet appeared in musical shows in other time slots, including Marcando el Ritmo. In December 1967, the LP Quién Soy was released. That same month Benítez received an award from WKVM after defeating Raphael in a musical debate. She was part of Idolos del 67, a concert that closed the year at Hiram Bithorn Stadium. Benítez was featured in a homage concert held in honor of Shorty Castro at Mayagüez. She was mentioned in an anthropological article published by Eugenio Fernández Méndez in Puerto Rico Illustrado, where the influence of multiple sources on Puerto Rican culture is discussed. She joined several artists in a "homage to the people" held at Parque Sixto Escobar in May 1968. She was among the top three local artists in popularity in April and May 1968. When Trans-Tel Corporation inaugurated a Spanish-language channel in New York, Benítez was recruited to appear in its programming. She won a trophy as the most popular artist of the year from Producciones Rabelo y Ledesma.

Beginning in June 1968, she headlined the Show de Lucecita Benítez which aired in Telemundo at 12:15 p.m. as part of the Show del Mediodía. The show was produced by Eddie Miró with choreography by Ita Medina and was retransmitted in New York Wednesdays on Channel 47. She also appeared in Paquito Cordero's film El curandero del pueblo (1968), starring along Adalberto Rodríguez. When Raphael returned for another tour of Puerto Rico, Benítez was recruited to perform. In December 1968, she received a trophy after winning another musical debate. The Show de Lucecita Benítez was awarded the 1968 Premio Agüeybaná for best 15-minute musical show. She helped the Asociación del Corazón raise funds in an event sponsored by WKAQ.

=== Winning the Festival Mundial de la Cancion Latina ===
In April 1969, Benítez entered the first edition of the Festival Mundial de la Cancion Latina, where she represented Puerto Rico along Danny Rivera. The festival was held at the Teatro Ferrocarrilero in Mexico. She participated with two songs, "Génesis" by G.V. Lloveras and "Energía de mis manos", by M. de Jesús. By winning the second eliminatory with 222 points (29 over second place Tony Renis), Benítez broke a trend of dominance by European performers with previous experience in similar events, which was regarded as a surprise. She also won as best dressed performer, also sporting an afro that symbolized her ethnic background. In the final she scored 228 to win the competition, a medal for Best Singer and an award for Best Melody, Dekalafe of Brasil finished second with 210 points. Pedro Rivera Toledo's arrangement of Genesis also won as the best arrangement, although the orchestra was conducted by Jose S. Marroquin. Benítez was contracted by RCA Records for their Spanish label, the first of Paquito Cordero's artists to sign with the multinational.

Benítez received official recognitions from the Governor of Puerto Rico, the Senate and the House of Representatives. Days later and still in Mexico, she transmitted a show dedicated to Puerto Rico via satellite following the festival. Both Benítez and Rivera arrived to Puerto Rico on April 2, 1969 and were received by the local public. Ruth Fernández publicly congratulated Benítez. The freemasons, in particular their Logia Sol de Libertad, also joined the various congratulations. Panamanian singer Silvia de Grasse composed "Lucecita", a merengue that commemorated her performance at the festival, which was recorded as "Lucecita Campeona" by Los Alegres Tres.

Her win was widely celebrated in Puerto Rico and abroad, by people such as her Santo Domingo Fan Club, while Nydia Caro replaced her in the afternoon show. The entire event was retransmitted locally through WAPA-TV. The arrival of Benítez and Rivera was televised live through WIPR-TV, with a victory caravan attended by thousands taking place from the airport to Viejo San Juan. Besides her fan clubs and politicians from all parties, the Federación de Músicos de Puerto Rico and the Asociación de Productores y Profesionales del Entretenimiento (APATE) attended the event. She was gifted with several things, including flowers, an official legislative motion, a municipal ordinance, the Key to the City of San Juan and an welcoming event at La Fortaleza. Benítez was invited to the Cannes Festival, to perform at the Luigi cafe of Mexico and to headline a series of events at the Caribe Hilton. She was also signed to appear in Spanish television at Madrid and in a series of films. The homages, both civil and official, and professional appearances were numerous during the following days, but ultimately took a toll on her health and forced a brief hospitalization due to physical exhaustion and traveled abroad to treat a sinus infection.

She became known as La Reina de la Juventud and regarded the principal performer of the "a gogo" rhythms in Puerto Rico. Her win at the Festival was used by Luis Fortuño Moscoso as a base for an argument that hotels and other administrations needed to take heed about the local talent and stop what he considered preferential treatment for foreign artists. Benítez recorded an orchestral cover of "Genesis" as a single, which became a hit upon release and the top song in Puerto Rico. Another song, "Cuando se Está Triste" also entered the Top-25 as did "Lucecita Campeona". Benítez performed along José Feliciano in a special program transmitted to Latin America. The APATE dedicated its congress and the municipality of Bayamón its Fiestas Patronales to her. Banco Popular produced a show titled "El Espectacular de Lucecita", which was a hit and aired twice on television. She spent her time between New York, San Juan and recording an LP and television specials at Mexico, retaking her role in El Show de Lucecita Benítez, including a special edition that aired on prime time on a Sunday. She also filmed Un Amante Anda Suelto. The Federación de Organizaciones Femeninas de Puerto Rico gave Benítez an award for her civic work.

=== International tours ===
In her first foreign film appearance, Benítez starred along Alberto Vázquez in a Hermanos Galindo production titled Un Amor en Puerto Rico. Her stay at Luigi's Cafe was successful and attended by Mexican celebrities and actors, featuring a repertoire composed by "La Vida", "Se Acabó", "Dime Dolor", "Picolísimo", "Como lo hice yo", "Esperaré", "Por Amor", "Niega, Niega" and "Mi Propio Yo". Benítez was also hosted by Angélica María. Paquito Cordero's Hit Parade label and RCA released the LP Génesis, which debuted at the top of the sales charts. The single "Hasta que me oiga Dios" made it to the Top-15, before climbing to the Top-10 in Puerto Rico. Benítez continued her Mexican tour with appearances at the Guadalajara and Monterrey plazas. The success of her performance had an unexpected result, which was that Benítez was known as "Génesis" by Latin American youths. At Ciudad de México, she offered a government-sponsored show at La Alameda. At television, Benítez appeared in the weekend show Siempre en Domingo. Following her Mexico tour, Benítez underwent a surgery related to her previous infection, before leaving to Madrid for an appearance at El Pabellón. When the Festival de Popularidad created its Hall of Fame at the Radio City theatre, Benítez and Avellanet were its first inductees.

At Puerto Rico, the Show de Lucecita Benítez continued its run during the summer. Teatro Corcelles featured Tres Puertorriqueñas y un Deseo, in which she starred along Braulio Castillo. Hilton contracted her to headline shows at the Caribe Hilton and San Gerónimo Hilton. In September 1969, Benítez starred in La Taberna de las Estrellas at the Puerto Rico theater in New York. Afterwards, Benítez made her debut at the Teatro San Juan at Chicago. She signed to appear in four Spanish films. In September 1969, the Madison Square Garden approached Benítez to make multiple appearances at the venue. Then mayor of New York, John V. Lindsay, gave Benítez a merit plaque for winning the Festival. Benítez was given a judging role at the Segundo Festival de la Canción Dominicana. Along Braulio Castillo, she was awarded for her foreign success at the Festival Codazos. Benítez, who had been an athlete in the past, collaborated to raise funds for the Puerto Rico Olympic Committee (COPUR) in an event named El Show Olímpico de Puerto Rico.

She opened 1970 by filming a special edition of the Show de Lucecita Benítez with Sammy Davis Jr. for Telemundo. She also helped the Teatro Coop-Arte raise funds, both for the entity and for other initiatives. Her album “Lucecita en la Intimidad” debuted among the Top-10 in Puerto Rico. In April 1970, Telemundo aired El Show Especial Internacional de Lucecita Benítez, filmed in Mexico. She collaborated with the municipality of San Juan on an event held to commemorate the Day of the Environment. She participated in a charity event held at Casa de España to raise funds for Peru following an earthquake. While she continued busy working in filming along the likes of Antonio Morales Jr. and Rocío Durcal, the single "El Rebelde" was a Top-5 hit in Puerto Rico. Besides this song, this LP included the singles "No quiero perderte", "Dónde Estoy" and "Qué te doy". As she became the best known Puerto Rican celebrity at Spain, Benítez, Avellanet, Sophy Hernández and Marisol Malaret filmed a special to be aired at Europe. She returned to New York to join Grace Mireya de la Vega and Los Apollo Sounds at Teatro Puerto Rico and the Jefferson Theatre. While meeting this schedule, Benítez continued hosting her show on a regular basis. Her performances gained positive reviews as far away as Italy.

Benítez spent another season at the Caribe Hilton, during which she abbreviated "Genesis" to 30 seconds, displaying exhaustion of performing it so often. With her participation, the ratings of El show del Mediodía continued increasing. The Caribe Hilton also contracted her for the peak tourist season, the first tome that a Puerto Rican artist performed in that slot. She was among several artists that performed at the Hiram Bithorn Stadium during the fall. While she continued being a fixture of local television, Benítez made an appearance at the Ed Sullivan Show which was taped on November 14, 1970. She participated in a homage that the Institute of Puerto Rican Culture (ICP) held for Ruth Fernández. The appearance in the Ed Sullivan Show was originally scheduled for 1971, but the positive reviews surrounding her performance in Casita María in New York hastened the process.

In February 1971, her single "Todas las Mañanas" entered the Top-5 in Puerto Rico. Her ubiquitous run on local television continued with Mi Estrella Favorita con Lucecita Benítez receiving the noon spot as part of the Show del Mediodía in April 1971, while Show de Lucecita Benítez made prime time appearances on Sundays. She was contracted to make appearances at the Quid in Ciudad Mexico, debuting on May 6, 1971. That same month, the single "Por Mi Orgullo" entered the hit charts in the Top-25, climbing to the Top-20, the Top-10 and peaking in the Top-5. She acted along Frank Moro in Tú, Mi Amor. In August, she headlined at El Pavillón at Madrid, also making television and radio appearances. Benítez recorded an album that would be distributed in Europe by RCA Spain, while Hit Parade released it in Puerto Rico. While she was working abroad she was substituted by Nilsa Candelaria and Neftalí Rivera. Benítez won WAPA's popularity contest over Lissette Álvarez by 2,000 votes, for which she received a trophy. She also won a rematch of sorts, once again winning WKAQ's popularity contest, this time by 2,096 votes.

In September 1971, Benítez returned for another season at the Caribe Hilton, where she was joined by Teddy Trinidad, besides her Spanish repertoire she also sang the English songs "You’ve Lost That Lovin’" and "Feeling". Parallel to this, the single "Gitanito" entered the Top-10 in Puerto Rico. Despite her schedule, Benítez still made appearances for the general public in some smaller towns, such as an event held at the Arquelio Torres Court at San Germán. She also made miscellaneous shows, such a collaboration with the Asociación de Industriales de Puerto Rico. During the spring of 1972, Benítez participated in an event to raise funds for other artists. Prior to her tour in Spain for the Festival de la Canción de Benidorm, the Senate of Puerto Rico approved a resolution wishing her well. In August, she performed along Danny Rivera and Oscar Solo at the Jefferson Theatre and Teatro Puerto Rico at New York.

Benítez appeared along Avellanet, José Miguel Class and Lissette in WKAQ's Súper Especial. The group also headlined a charity show to raise funds for Fondos Benéficos Unidos which aired on the same channel. Beníyez was featured in Fernando Cortés's Tonta, Tonta, Pero no Tanto which included scenes performing the song "Todas las Mañanas". She began another season at the Caribe Hilton during the fall of 1972. To close the year, the municipality of Mayagüez contracted her to perform in the inauguration of the Plaza Colón. In May 1973, Benítez became the first Puerto Rican artist to perform at the Palacio de Bellas Artes in Santo Domingo as part of a tour that included appearances at Santiago de los Caballeros, La Vega and La Romana. Afterwards, she recorded an LP, which included "Soy de Una Raza Pura, Pura y Rebelde" and "Camino Abandonado" which were hits. She continued including popular events, such as Fiestas Patronales, in her schedule. In September 1973, WKAQ-FM hosted her for an entire day, during which she interpreted numerous songs from her career. After returning to the Caribe Hilton for another season, Benítez left for Madrid to record another LP.

In November 1973, Benítez, Avellanet and Rivera traveled to New York to make appearances at Madison Square Garden and the Carnegie Hall. Upon returning to Puerto Rico she joined Rivera and Rosita Velázquez in a concert to benefit the employees of the Administración de Compensaciones por Accidentes de Automóviles (ACAA). Meanwhile, she participated in a Valentine's Day special that aired on WKAQ. Benítez appeared in the charity tele-marathon for the muscular dystrophy association.

=== Going independent ===
She joined Pedro Rivera Toledo and Víctor Cuchi to create the Taller Puertorriqueño de Teleconciertos with the intent of producing concerts and television content by themselves, beginning with "Traigo un Pueblo en mi Voz" which was recorded at Teatro Sylvia Rexach. Benítez aired these specials beginning in December 1974 and for the following months. She continued making less frequent television appearances in shows such as Estudio Dos. Benítez presented the “En las manos del pueblo” event at the Helio Isla hotel and at Radio City. In 1975, she was among the honorees of the municipality of San Juan during the International Year of the Woman. In January 1976, Benítez began offering a tour of concerts at low prices, which began at Isidoro García Stadium in Mayagüez. She also appeared in El Súper Show for Channels 11, 9, 8 and 44. During the summer, the Ponce chapter of the Federación de Mujeres Puertorriqueñas and the Círculo José de Diego sponsored her concerts. She returned to the Fiestas Patronales, this time at Moca. In September 1976, Benítez presented Traigo un Pueblo en mi Voz at the Teatro Sylvia Rexach.

Benítez was one of the artists featured in the ICP's XI Festival de la Música Popular, which honored Rafael Hernández. She was featured at the Conferencia Puertorriqueña de la Mujer, organized by Universidad del Sagrado Corazón, offering a free concert where she offered her version of songs composed by Antonio Cabán Vale. Benítez returned for another season at the Caribe Hilton during the summer of 1977. She was one of the artists featured in a television documentary about Puerto Rico that aired on national television in Spain. While performing at the Caribe Hilton, she organized a concert at Teatro Tapia which featured the repertoire that was featured at the hotel, the first offered at the venue after being restored. During the fall, Benítez performed at the Ocho Puertas nightclub in Viejo San Juan. She also made celebrity appearances in events such as Señorita Puerto Rico, helping select the representative for the municipality of Ponce. She closed the year by participating at Tierrazo, an event that gathered several artists at the Roberto Clemente Coliseum and was transmitted by Channel 11 in March.

Her album adaptation of "En las Manos del Pueblo" received a nomination for Album of the year at the ACE Awards organized by the New York-based Asociación de Cronistas de Espectáculos. Benítez made television appearances at El Show de Charytín, hosted by fellow singer Charytín Goyco, and Balcón Boricua. She was part of the Puerto Rican delegation that participated at the Festival Mundial de la Juventud y los Estudiantes. Benítez returned to the Caribe Hilton during the summer of 1978, during which Channel 11 recorded the Especial de Lucecita Benítez that aired in September. Benítez and Alberto Carrión hosted an event at the UPR where they interpreted music based on the poetry of Julia de Burgos and Luis Palés Matos. She also headlined the anniversary of the Ocho Puertas night club and the Christmas event of the Unión de Mujeres Americanas. During the 1979 San Sebastián Street Festival, Benítez and other artists performed to raise funds for the restoration of the San José Church. On March 9, 1979, Benítez was expected to sign "La Borinqueña" prior to the start of the Wilfredo Gómez vs. Néstor Jiménez fight, but she wasn't allowed to sing the revolutionary version of the song written by Lola Rodríguez de Tió and ultimately not picked up for the presentation. She was one of the artists featured at the Concierto de la Mujer held at Bayamón. Afterwards, she returned to TWKAQ-TV for an episode of Noche de Gala and the station's 25th anniversary show.

In April 1979, Benítez joined Ismael Miranda in a concert at the theatre of the University of Puerto Rico. The following month, she began recording her first crossover LP into the salsa genre. During the summer, Benítez participated in Concierto Margarita 2, to raise funds for children with cerebral disabilities. Benítez headlined the Primer Concierto Panamericano, which was filmed at Castillo San Felipe del Morro and transmitted live. Afterwards, she joined Danny Rivera, Roy Brown, Aires Bucaneros and Haciendo Punto en Otro Son in Y Ellos Se Juntan, a concert to raise funds for Jacobo Morales' Dios los Cría film and which was transmitted through Channel 11. Benítez was featured in the movie Festival: Mundial de la Juventud produced by the Cinemateca Nacional de Puerto Rico and directed by José García and filmed at the eponymous festival. In October 1979, she performed at the Palace Hotel at Isla Verde.

=== Genre diversification and experimental stage ===
She performed at the VI Festival de Arte de Verano at San Juan. Benítez co-starred in the telenovela Vida along Johanna Rosaly. She opened 1980 by returning to Ocho Puertas for another season. Benítez reunited with Avellanet to perform at El Show de Chucho Avellanet. Her stay at the telenovela was short and she released another LP and resumed her concerts with one to raise funds for Vieques. Benítez continued participating in charity events, with the next being for Telecadena Pérez Perry for the benefit of the Sociedad de Niños y Adultos Lisiados. She participated as an invited artist in a concert offered by Lourdes Jímenez and Roxana Badillo at Viejo San Juan. In November 1980, Channel 11 aired a Taller Estudio musical special with the participation of several artists, including Benítez. In December, she made her return to Teatro Tapia and performed her past hits, songs from her latest production and some Christmas music. Benítez participated in the Ponce Holiday Inn's Valentine Day’s event, accompanied by the Pedro Rivera orchestra. In March she offered a concert at the UPR, before leaving in a Latin American tour that included stops at Panama and Santo Domingo. Benítez was the main artistic show at the Carita awards held at the Hotel San Juan. Afterwards, she repeated this role at the V Festival del Peinado, a beauty and styling event. Benítez also appeared at the Noches de Salsa y Nostalgia at Velasco in Carolina, helping raise funds for the Ashford Memorial Hospital. She repeated her appearance at the Super Telespecial for the Sociedad de Niños y Adultos Lisiados. During the summer of 1981, she made a return to the Caribe Hilton.

Benítez was invited to participate at the first Boricua Festival at Chicago, which was organized by the Coalición Acción Latina. She was among several artists that were approached by the COPUR to aid in raising funds for the Olympic delegation. In December, Benítez headlined a show named Lucecita es Lucecita at Centro de Bellas Artes. The show was later presented at Teatro Tapia. In April 1982, Benítez and Orvil Miller performed at Mayagüez in a show named Concierto de Estrellas. Afterwards, she made an appearance in El Show de Iris Chacón, which was retransmitted throughout Latin America. She released Criollo folklore, an unedited production. In the summer, Benítez returned for another season at the Caribe Hilton. Afterwards, she began another Latin American tour. By this stage in her career, Benítez had opted to mostly ignore the commercial aspects of the industry and experiment with several musical rhythms besides the typical ballads. While at the hotel, she participated in a popular concert titled Un Sábado en tu Plaza organized at Bayamón. After returning from the tour, Benítez returned to the Centro de Bellas Artes. During the spring, she held a concert at Ponce.

When Rubén Blades finished his collaboration with Willie Colón, he chose Benítez to be his counterpart in the concert Salsa y Sentimiento, which featured the debut of his band Seis del Solar. During this time, she was pondering creating her own record label and was preparing the first stages of her participation in the zarzuela Cecilia Valdés. She sang "Que te vaya bien", "Uno", "Que tal te va sin mí", "Vuelve el impostergable", "Aubao Moin", "Medley Romántico" and "Según el color", finishing by singing Blades' repertoire of "Plantación Adentro" and "Tiburón". Benítez joined Cheo Feliciano and Los Rayos Gamma in the Concierto de la Cooperacion, sponsored by the cooperative movement. She once again returned to the tele-marathon for the Sociedad de Niños y Adultos Lisiados, serving as the closing act. During the fall, Benítez returned to perform at the Caribe Hilton. She began working on her first production of Puerto Rican traditional music with Alberto Carrión, also the first under her own label. She received the Sol del Yunque award from the Club Cívico de Damas de Puerto Rico.

She also joined Avellanet for the concert Amigos at Centro de Bellas Artes and the UPR. During the winter, Benítez was featured at the 8va Feria de Artesanía Bacardí. She also joined Avellanet for the concert La Música de Roberto Cole at Viejo San Juan and the Palacio de Recreación y Deportes at Mayagüez. Benítez also made other presentations at the western coast, such as at the Café de Las Lonas in San Germán. When the municipality of Bayamón refurbished the Teatro Braulio Castillo, its new main room was named after her. To open 1984, the ICP dedicated the San Sebastián Street Festival to her, Danny Rivera, Félix Rodríguez, Antonio Rodríguez Vera and the medalists at the 1983 Pan American Games.

Benítez joined Avellanet in a charity concert for the Hospital del Niño. She then collaborated with Ballets de San Juan, for their 30th anniversary season. Benítez held a concert for the Week of the Secretary at the Condado Convention Center. Two weeks later, she helped the Asociación Puertorriqueña del Corazón raise funds at the Condado Plaza Holiday Inn. Benítez then headlined the Son Borincano Festival. During the summer, she returned to the Caribe Hilton for another season. Parallel to this, Benítez participated in the Festival Latino at New York, during which she healined the nueva canción show. In August, she offered the concert “Lucecita… Canta para ti” at Caguas. Benítez made an appearance at the Festival Interamericano de las Artes, participating in the popular music category.

=== Grabaciones Lobo ===
In November 1986, Benítez acted in La verdadera historia de Pedro Navaja in the role of Miss Reignhold. Parallel to this, she recorded the LP Éxitos Callejeros under her record label, Grabaciones Lobos. At the Festival Navideño of Bayamón, she received a homage from the nuns of the Hermanas de Jesús Mediador convent. Teatro Tapia invited her to perform her concert inspired on the poetry of Julia de Burgos along Alberto Carrión. She also resumed making television appearances, becoming a recurrent act in Cordero's El Show de las 12. When Avellanet debuted a new show on Teleluz, Benítez was the invited artist. She then participated in a charity event to raise funds for fishermen from Vieques following a series of swells that caused the destruction of their equipment. Benítez returned to perform at the Fiestas Patronales. Her show about Julia de Burgos was modified to also include Silvia Rexach and the Ballets de San Juan, being named Dos Musas del Agua, being presented at Centro de Bellas Artes during the spring of 1985.

She was a mentor at the Festival de Nuevos Talentos. She appeared at La noche de nuestra música, which aired through Channel 6 and 3. In May 1985, Benítez returned to the Caribe Hilton, this one based on music from the 1940s and 50s. She was among the artists that performed at the PEN Club awards. She then headlined a nostalgia based concert named The Rolling 20's to raise funds for the Asociación contra la Distrofia Muscular”. Benítez continued her nostalgic tour with her own stage production Lucecita en nostalgia at the Centro de Bellas Artes. Outside of music, she participated in a fashion show for the benefit of citizens affected by a series of floods. Benítez, Avellanet and Gilberto Monroig recorded the music of Roberto Cole in a production of the ICP. She was featured on WAPA-TV's 1985 New Year's Eve special. She participated in the Cumbre Criolla, a tour of traditional Puerto Rican music, along Antonio Cabán Vale, Roy Brown, Andrés Jímenez and other artists. For the Week of the Woman, Benítez held a concert at the UPR and at the Feria de la Mujer at Viejo San Juan. She recorded the main theme of TeleOnce's Ellas al 1/2 día. Benítez then presented Lucecita en Nostalgia at the Quality Royale hotel at Miramar. She headlined the show commemorating the fifth anniversary of the Centro de Bellas Artes, being accompanied by Trio Los Condes.

Benítez participated in a charity concert to benefit writer Abelardo Díaz Alfaro. She was the subject of Voz y Sentimiento de una Estrella a television special directed by Jesús Burgos and aired on Channel 6. Benítez was one of several artists featured in the Festival de Apoyo al Músico Puertorriqueño. She collaborated with José Nogueras in his single "Que me quieras". She made television appearances for Peña en Down Beat and Estudio Alegre. During the summer of 1986, Benítez released Nostalgia Vol. I, the first of an intended trilogy. Afterwards, she participated again to the annual tele-marathon for the Sociedad Nacional de Niños y Adultos Lisiados. During the following months, she participated in other charity events, in favor of the Pueblo del Niño and the Red Cross. Benítez then held a series of shows at the Hotel San Juan, which featured content from her Nostalgia production.

=== Second international phase ===
Afterwards, Benítez traveled to Argentina for the Festival de Teatro de Córdova, where she presented Pedro y el Capitán, a play written by Mario Benedetti. Benítez participated in the tele-marathon in benefit of the muscular dystrophy association. Cumbre Criolla was recorded and released as its own LP and her participation at the Centro de Bellas Artes anniversary became the television special Noche de Luz. She also presented the show Añoranzas at the Condado Convention Center, which also raised funds for the mentally handicapped. Benítez collaborated with Plácido Domingo, Danny Rivera, Nidya Caro and Los Hispanos in Gala de las Estrellas in benefit of cancer research. She also presented “Nostalgia” at the Interamerican University of Puerto Rico. Benítez was the invited artist in Ballets de San Juan Trilogía show. She also joined José Nogueras at the Caribe Hilton. When the Torch of Peace arrived to Puerto Rico, she participated in the Fiestas Puertorriqueñas de la Paz. Benítez opened 1987 by performing at the Collage night club at Manatí. In mid-January, she released Nostalgia Vol. II under her Grabaciones Lobo record label. She participated in Telemundo's Valentine's Day special and on February 14 joined José José in a concert at Santo Domingo. In March 1987, Benítez brought an encore of Traigo un Pueblo en mi Voz to Centro de Bellas Artes, which was later transmitted through television. Recognizing that she had focused on the local market for years, she decided to begin an international tour. Prior to this, she made a return to Estudio Alegre.

Despite being focused on foreign markets, she still made appearances in events including a concert for the teachers of Puerto Rico. As the local government organized a commission to celebrate the fifth century of European presence in the Americas, Benítez was brought in to sing the ballet Julia in an event where similar commissions from the region met at San Juan. During her tour, she experienced success at Argentina, where she made appearances at Teatro Astrol, her songs where adopted for telenovelas and Éxitos callejeros outranked Madonna and Julio Iglesias to win the Platinum Disc. After collaborating with Pablo Milanés in shows held at the United States, they were expected to perform in the opening acts of the third Festival Latino, but an injury to her vocal cords prevented this and forced an extended hiatus. In 1989, the Fiestas de la Calle San Sebastián were dedicated to her and historian Arturo Morales Carrión and she performed. She acted in the telenovela Ave de Paso which began transmitting in January. She also resumed her media appearances and released Traigo un pueblo en mi voz as a LP which reached the Top-5 in sales. During the spring, Benítez returned to Argentina. However, in that country she opted to release another LP Gaviota del aire, which included aongs already featured in telenovelas. She also broke her business partnership with Interdisc, which had been responsible for distributing “Éxitos callejeros” in South America and owed her money. During this time, she considered offers from Venezuela and pondered a return to Europe as well.

=== Traigo un Pueblo en mi Voz encore ===
At Puerto Rico, Benítez performed at the Agro Expo '88 at Caguas the semester ending concert at the UPR at Río Piedras. She also participated at a tele-marathon to raise funds for Hogar CREA. Benítez also recorded the main theme of the local telenovela Yara prohibida and La cuñada. In May, she released the single Usted señor corazón, a preview of the Gaviota del aire LP. During the summer, Benítez traveled to Habana to participate in the Festival International de Música. Her first collaboration with Justino Díaz took place as part of the Gloria y ensueño event held at the Centro de Bellas Artes, which later aired on Telemundo. In August 1988, Gaviota al aire began being distributed in Puerto Rico, her first unedited production since 1982 and the sixth released under Grabaciones Lobo and which entered the Top-3. Benítez was invited to the 1988 Buga Festival at Colombia, her first appearance in that country. She then joined opera singer Pablo Elvira in the concert Camaradería 88. Benítez organized the concert Aquí nació mi canción in her native Bayamón. She was among the artists that participated in First Bank’s Un banco, un pueblo y su música: 40 años de ilusiones concert. The municipality of Bayamón declared December 3 the "Day of Lucecita Benítez". Both Traigo un Pueblo en mi Voz (50) and Gaviota del Aire (13) were among the Top-50 LPs sold in Puerto Rico during the year.

In January 1989, Benítez participated in Unidos por Nicaragua, por Roberto Clemente to raise aid for Nicaragua after the strike of Hurricane Joan-Miriam. She joined Justino Díaz again to raise funds for handicapped children. Benítez collaborated with singer Sebastián in his debut album. On April 16, 1989, Puerto Rico Illustrado dedicated an issue to her career, in particular to the win at the Festival de la Canción Latina. During this time, she continued making television appearances, hosting cocktails and the occasional civic activity. Benítez was invited to perform at the Festival de la Cultura Caribeña organized by Casa del Caribe and honoring Bob Marley. She was honored at the 1989 National Puerto Rican Day Parade. JC Penney also homaged her at their Beauty Carnival. In August 1989, Benítez presented the LP Una mujer sin tiempo, which she immediately followed with an eponymous concert at Centro de Bellas Artes.

When the International Olympic Committee (IOC) held its 95th Session at San Juan, Benítez was among the artists that performed at the event. She was contracted by the Puerto Rico Telephone Company (PRTC) to promote its long-distance subsidiary. During the fall of 1989, Benítez made her return to theatre as the character “Bloody Mary” in “South Pacific” at Centro de Bellas Artes. She also participated in Estereptempo’s “Encuentro de los Grandes”, along several local artists. Benítez closed the year by participating in Súper Siete’s Christmas special. During the spring of 1990, Benítez was offered a sum of $30,000 to film a commercial for Lopito, Illeana & Howie supporting the sale of the PRTC, but declined. In August 1990, she returned to the Centro de Bellas Artes with another concert titled Éxitos en mi voz. During the fall of 1990, Benítez returned to New York, where she offered a concert at Teatro Puerto Rico. In December, she made an appearance at the “Vices para la historia” concert presented as part of the Fería de Artesanias Bacardí.

== Personal life ==
Benítez was born, raised and educated at Bayamón. Her father Juan Benítez was a sailor, who was the main breadwinner of the family until she became a full time artist, while her mother Luz María Rosado took up managing her mail after she became famous. Benítez is one of four siblings along her brothers Juan Enrique, Raymond and Wilfredo. Her first guitar was brought by her father from one of his voyages and she spent hours learning to play by herself. After she entertained friends and family with her playing, they insisted that her mother enrolled her at Rafael Quiñones Vidal's Tribuna del Arte program, where she won the first place award. Tough not a fan of jewelry, Benítez did use a "lucky ring" as a teenager. Unlike her stage persona, she preferred simple clothing. Besides guitar, Benítez also plays the piano and battery, which she learned by ear. She attended the Puerto Rico Junior College for her basic training, intending to continue studies in psychology and music. As a teenager, her favorite song was "Mi propio yo" and her favorite genre was classical.

She expressed no concern with how the media perceived her personality, which they perceived as too direct and frank to the point of bluntness, a departure from the traditional artist. By 1973, Benítez described her fashion as a humble and uninterested in luxurious dresses and fine jewelry. Actor Miguel Ángel Suárez considered Benítez and Danny Rivera the two signers that could easily make a full transition to theatre. In 1971, Benítez was gifted a 1970 Fiat car that was lost within months, after catching fire at a gas station in an incident that gathered media coverage. In 1974, she campaigned for the creation of a cycling exclusive lane in San Juan. The public's perception that Benítez and Avellanet were involved led to the creation of a popular rivalry between her base and the fans of Lisette Álvarez.

Her schedule affected her personal life to a degree, with only New Year's Eve being reserved as a family day. During the early 1970s reports tied her to actor Frank Moro, with rumors of wedding appearing in media, but Benítez denied these. Benítez lived with her mother at Tintillo Gardens into her 40s. In 1986, Benítez stated that one of her regrets was not becoming a mother, since she liked children. She was the face of a number of foreigh brands when marketing to the local public. In 1972, her repertoire was included in Eastern Airlines' playlist as part of a promotional campaign. During the fall of 1986, she was contracted by Kimberly Clark to produce music for commercials of their Huggies brand.

=== Social views ===
Throughout her career, she expressed liberal ideals that included support for the LGBT, equality for women, the legalization of prostitution and criticism for the Catholic Church. These were controversial among the more-conservative Puerto Rucans of the 1970s and led to numerous blacklists in both local television and radio. Benítez supports syndicalism and on several occasions collaborated with unions. In December 1970, she participated at Espectáculo 70, where several local and foreign artists performed to gather funds for a health plan for the members of the Federación de Músicos and the Unión Puertorriqueña de Artistas. In 1977, Benítez hosted the Christmas party of the Instituto Laboral de Educación Sindical (ILES) of the Unión General de Trabajadores (UGT). On May 1, 1978, Benítez received an homage from the UGT at the first Festival Obrero due to her public stances in favor of syndicalism. Another union, the Sindicato de Equipo Pesado (SEP), gave her an homage for being a distinguished public figure. In July 1985, Benítez headlined the Voces de Nuestra Tierra concert sponsored by the union of UPR employees.

=== Political ideology ===
Benítez is a lifelong member of the Puerto Rican independence movement and first participated in an event to raise funds for the Puerto Rican Independence Party (PIP) in 1970. She also supported Noel Colón Martínez's candidacy for the party in 1972 and headlined the event that closed the campaign along several artists. When Colón Martínez was expelled from the party, she was among 15 artists that boycotted an activity in protest. Afterwards, Benítez was part of the Festival de Arte Puertorriqueño organized by the Puerto Rican Socialist Party (PSP). Afterwards, Benítez resumed her appearances for the PIP. In an interview during the early 1970s that followed the cancellation of her show, Benítez expressed that there was pressure to keep her out of television due to being outspoken about her beliefs, which earned the interest of Ruth Fernández, who had been elected for the Senate of Puerto Rico. She announced that she was likely going to leave Puerto Rico, expressing that both her and Cordero knew that something anomalous was happening around her figure and that it concerned her political beliefs and the reaffirmation of her African heritage in her look.

She was present at a meeting that took place on October 27, 1974 at New York, during which the topic of Puerto Rican independence was discussed. She was among the artists that headlined Concierto de Conciertos for the PIP. She also performed at the PSP’s general assembly, Apoyo a Claridad and the 1976 campaign closer. She became a fixture at the Festival Claridad. Benítez participated in multiple tele-marathons to raise funds for the PIP for their 1980 campaign. When Puerto Rican nationalist Andrés Figueroa Cordero was released from prison, she participated in an event organized by the Comité Pro Libertad de los Presos Nacionalistas. When the Federal Bureau of Investigation (FBI) raided the house of Antonio Martorell while searching for members of the Ejercito Popular Boricua (EPB-Macheteros), Benítez was among the artists that signed supporting him. She also favored the integration of Puerto Rico to the UNESCO and other similar initiatives from the municipality of San Juan. Despite being on ideologically opposite ends, Benítez interviewed Carlos Romero Barceló while preparing a thesis on the influence of arts on social transformation. When cuvic leader Ismael Guadalupe was charged in a federal court for his protests against the United States Navy at Vieques, Benítez signed a manifesto in his favor. She participated in a march to protest American intervention at Nicaragua. Despite her beliefs, Benítez voted for Rafael Hernández Colón in 1984 and later participated in his inauguration ceremony.

Benítez was one of several independentist artists profiled and monitored by the Police Department due to their political leanings, a practice known as carpeteo in Puerto Rico, and was the subject of a criminal case that was dismissed due to lack of evidence in 1976. Though the now-defunct cultural publication Bohemia on occasion published articles about her and other related topics such as the fan clubs, she refused to grant the magazine interviews after discovering that they had a black list of independentist artists and that she was in it, a situation that persisted even after Pedro Zervigón took over. In February 1973, Danny Rivera revealed that Benítez, Avellanet and himself, among other artists, were having copyright prohibitions of their tracks being enforced by the Federación de Músicos de Puerto Rico that prevented them from being used in television, limiting their revenue. In January 1986, a report by the Miami Herald revealed that Benítez along Rubén Blades, Alberto Cortés, Joan Manuel Serrat, Avellanet, Rivera, Víctor Manuel and Ana Belén had been blacklisted by commercial station in Miami due to the sociopolitical commentary in their songs.

== Legacy ==
=== Reception and influence ===
Benítez was one of the most popular artists among the Puerto Rican youth of the 1960s and 1970s, but she also had a following among older age groups and across ideological groups. Actor José Manuel Zambrana cited Benítez as his favorite local artist when he was a teenager. Sophie Hernández considered Benítez and Avellanet her favorite artists. Olga Guillot labelled Benítez "one of the most complete artists and a great voice". Singer Tamara Escribano, known professionally as Tammy, listed Benítez and Avellanet as her favorite artists. Benítez is the godmother of Julio Ángel II, son of the singer of the same name.

For reasons unknown, Héctor Campos Parsi omitted mentioning her in the seventh tome of his encyclopedia Gran Enciclopedia de Puerto Rico, which raised disapproval from other media critics. In August 1989, artist Hiram Morales painted and sculpted several pieces as part of a series titled "Trayectoria-Lucecita" which was exhibited at the Telemundo studios and covered several aspects of her career up to that point. Her popularity led to one of her fans, Deisa Díaz, to create the first impersonator act in her image.

== Other songs ==
In the mid-1960s:

- "Un lugar para los dos" Spanish, these song was versioned of "I Only Want to Be with You".
- "Muévanse todos (El Club del Clan)" Spanish, these song was versioned of "Twist and Shout.
- "No seas tan bobo" Spanish, this song was based on "Gonna Get Along Without Ya Now"

March 1969:

- "Genesis" written by Guillermo Venegas LLoveras from the town of Quebradillas in Puerto Rico.

== See also ==
- List of Puerto Ricans
- History of women in Puerto Rico
