= Festival Mundial de la Canción Latina =

The Festival Mundial de la Canción Latina was a televised song contest in 1969 and 1970, hosted in Mexico, which preceded and was succeeded by the Festival OTI de la Canción which ran from 1972 to 2000. The original festival was supported by the Government of Mexico and hosted in the Teatro Ferrocarrilero. The contest focused on music from Romance-speaking countries from across Latin America and Latin Europe, namely Spanish, Portuguese, French, and Italian.

== Winners ==
Year	Winner	Artist	Song
1969	Puerto Rico	Lucecita Benítez	"Génesis"
1970	Brazil	Cláudya	"Canção de amor e paz" (Peace and love song)
