= Ashley (singer) =

Puerto Rican merenque singer

- Born: Ashley Colón; October 27, 1975 (age 50)
- Origin: Puerto Rico
- Genres: Merengue
- Occupation: Singer
- Instrument: Vocals
- Years active: 1997–present
- Labels: Sony Music; VI Music; GT MUSIK INC

Ashley Colón (born October 27, 1975, in Puerto Rico), nicknamed La Chica Bomba, is a Puerto Rican merengue singer. Mostly influenced by popular Puerto Rican singer and actress Iris Chacón, Ashley began her successful career as a member of the tropical band Las Chicas del Clan (The Girls of the Clan). Her debut as a solo artist came in 1997 with the release of the album Yo Soy la Bomba. The hit song "Yo Soy La Reina" from the album of the same name followed that same year. She performed with Elvis Crespo at the annual Tu Música awards ceremony. In 1999 Abrázame, meaning "hug me", became her international breakthrough, supported by a Latin American and U.S. tour. In 1999, she released a Tejano album called Sabor a dulce, followed by a greatest hits album in 2000 called Oro Merenguero. She also released El poder de las mujeres. Her most recent album, Estoy Loca, was released in 2003.

Ashley has charted on the Billboard Latin charts. She is nicknamed la chica bomba (the bomb[-astic] girl).

== Discography ==
Yo Soy la Bomba

- Released: 1997
- Format: CD
- Label: Sony Tropical

Yo Soy La Reina

- Released: 1997
- Format: CD
- Label: Sony Tropical

Abrazame

- Released: 1999
- Format: CD
- Label: Sony

Sabor a Dulce

- Released: 1999
- Format: CD
- Label: VI Music

oro Merenguero

- Released: 2000
- Format: CD
- Label: Sony

el poder de las mujeres

- Released: 2000
- Format: CD
- Label: VI Music

ESTOY LOCA

- Released: 2003
- Format: CD
- Label: GT MUSIK
