= Cántale a tu Bebé =

2009 studio album by Mary Ann Acevedo

Studio album by Mary Ann Acevedo
- Released: September 1, 2009
- Recorded: 2009
- Genre: Lullaby
- Length: 1:00:15 (Standard edition); 18:03 (iTunes Latino Edition)
- Label: Guillermo Torres Music (GT Music)
- Producer: Guillermo Torres; Mary Ann Acevedo

Mary Ann Acevedo chronology
Mary Ann (2006)	Cántale a tu Bebé (2009)	Génesis (2012)

Singles from Cántale a tu Bebé
- 1. "Llegaste Tú" Released: October 21, 2009

Alternative cover
- iTunes Latino Edition

"Cántale a tu Bebé" is the name given to the second studio album by the Puerto Rican singer, songwriter and actress, Mary Ann Acevedo who performs with her husband, producer Guillermo Torres and features songs by the happy couple. Mary Ann is in the hopes of their first child so this project has all the feeling and love of an artist who is living the whole process of a woman waiting for her firstborn.

Love, happiness and peace are some of the feelings that transmit Mary Ann Acevedo. The young artist now sings for babies and thus wants to revive the passion in mothers singing to her child and so bring a beautiful message, reassurance, love and peace fill your baby through beautiful lullabies, a great tool for first-time mother and still more.

== Background ==
Sing to your son, is a comforting experience. It is important that when you share this moment with your child, do it with loving, clear voice, and also to transmit the teaching of communication early, you're preparing your mind to receive and identify the sound waves from the voice of Mom and Dad, which will reassure and create a more effective and pleasurable experience. Be sure to look for the perfect time to share with your child.

Must be when you are in the process of rest, the moment of waking from a nap or when you as a parent understand that your child is receptive to listening to music. Sing, and opportunity for the child to interact with you, ensure that he is attentive and active participant in the process. Your baby is born and want to share with you this new stage in life you start. Considering the importance of maintaining a distinctive tradition, and rescue the beautiful old customs, we come to you, Dad and Mom through this CD that is designed to enrich your baby's mind from the beginning. Here's an excellent selection of lullabies that stimulate the feelings between father, mother and baby, also contribute to a better emotional development in its growth stage.

== Single ==
"Llegaste Tú" is the single from second studio album of Mary Ann Acevedo, Cántale a tu Bebé. The single released on October 20, 2009 on national radio and television. "Llegaste Tú", as a promotional song, is a very special in this musical production, as Mary Ann and her husband Guillermo Torres, dedicate this song to their daughter Anna Carolina Torres Acevedo, who was born on February 1, 2010.

Mary Ann released the song in national television, (WAPA-TV), officially in "Entre Nosotras" program in which Mary Ann has a section for mothers like her called "Aprendiendo A Ser Mamá"; her participation in the program has been widely accepted by mothers and also tune in by fans who daily watch the show to follow up her career and her pregnancy. The music video was released on October 20, 2009 at the TV program "Entre Nosotras" (WAPA-TV). Mary Ann sang "Llegaste Tú" in a live version at the TV program.

== Track listing ==
Standard Edition

1. "Gotita de Agua" - 2:13
2. "Mariposa Bella" - 2:42
3. "Dejame Verte Soñar" - 2:51
4. "Rayito de Sol" - 2:18
5. "Noche Serena" - 1:40
6. "La Nana" - 2:31
7. "La Linda Manita" - 1:05
8. "Las Estrellas Sonrien" - 2:49
9. "Llegaste Tú" - 3:07
10. "Cancion de Cuna" - 2:24
11. "El Caballito" - 2:16
12. "Los Pollitos" - 1:34
13. "Tortita & Pon Pon" - 1:24
14. "Instrumental (Like Tango)" - 2:40
15. "Gotita de Agua" (Instrumental) - 2:16
16. "Mariposa Bella" (Instrumental) - 2:42
17. "Dejame Verte Soñar" (Instrumental) - 2:51
18. "Rayito de Sol" (Instrumental) - 2:20
19. "Noche Serena" (Instrumental) - 1:38
20. "La Nana" (Instrumental) - 2:31
21. "La Linda Manita" (Instrumental) - 1:04
22. "Las Estrellas Sonrien" (Instrumental) - 2:51
23. "Llegaste Tú" (Instrumental) - 3:06
24. "Cancion de Cuna" (Instrumental) - 2:23
25. "El Caballito" (Instrumental) - 2:16
26. "Los Pollitos" (Instrumental) - 1:35
27. "Tortita & Pon Pon" (Instrumental) - 1:23

iTunes Latino Edition

1. "Gotita de Agua" - 2:29
2. "Mariposa Bella" - 2:51
3. "Rayito de Sol" - 2:29
4. "Dejame Verte Soñar" - 3:03
5. "Llegaste Tú" - 3:22
6. "El Caballito" - 2:21
7. "A la Nanita Nana" - 2:44
8. "Las Estrellas Sonrien" - 2:59

== Personnel ==
- Vocals – Mary Ann Acevedo, Rawy Torres

=== Production ===
- Executive Producer: Guillermo Torres
- Mastering: Playback Recording / Jingle Bells Recording
- Engineers: Ramon Martinez, Carlos Velazquez, Nestor Gonzalez

== Release history ==
Region	Date	Label	Format	Notes
Puerto Rico	September 1, 2009	GT Music	Digital Download	Standard Edition
Puerto Rico	October 5, 2009	GT Music	Compact disc	Standard Edition
United States	September 27, 2009	GT Music	Digital download	Standard Edition
Worldwide	February 18, 2010	GT Music	Digital download	iTunes EP - Special edition
