= Navidad Boricua: Mi Pueblo esta de Fiesta =

Compilation album by various artists
- Released: December 2007
- Recorded: 2007
- Genre: Christmas, Latin
- Label: GT Music

Various artists chronology
| Navidad Boricua: Con Sabor a Mi Tierra (2005) | Navidad Boricua: Mi Pueblo esta de Fiesta (2007) |

Navidad Boricua: Mi Pueblo esta de Fiesta is one of the compilations made by Puerto Rican artists with songs that reflect the Christmas tradition of Puerto Rico. In this album are various singers of Puerto Rico as Joseph Fonseca, Michael Stuart, Grupo Kaos, Plenéalo, Daniela Droz, Andy Montañez, Los Sabrosos del Merengue, Junny Ramos, Salsa Kids, Mary Ann Acevedo, among others. The last version of this compilation, Navidad Boricua has raised over half a million dollars to over fifteen foundations highly needed in the Island. All money raised from the album sales were destined for Puerto Rico Down Syndrome Foundation and the Foundation Anthony "Junior" Soto.

== Track listing ==
1. Olvídate de la luz
2. Medley Pa' Parrandear:
  - El Fuá
  - Tengo una Juma
  - De Palo en Palo
  - Yo me tomo el Ron
  - Comadrita la Rana
3. Alegría y Bomba Eh'
4. El Arbolito
5. Boricuas de Corazón
6. Medley Plenarengue:
  - Alegre Vengo
  - Hermoso Bouquet
  - Ramillete
  - De la Montaña Venimos
7. Amanecer Borincano / De ahi vengo yo
8. Medley Plenas:
  - Aguinaldo Isabeleño
  - Pobre Lechón
  - Burrito Sabanero
9. Suena mi Tambora

*Source:
