= Samantha Love =

Puerto Rican activist and television personality (born 1969)

Samantha Love (born August 30, 1969) is a Puerto Rican television and radio personality, artistic imitator, actress and transgender rights activist. Her radio shows have been heard in places as far from Puerto Rico as Veracruz, Mexico.

== Biography ==
Love has been involved in show business since 1987 when she was 18. She has also been involved in a number of controversies. During 2010, she mentioned Puerto Rican singer Ivy Queen on her (Love's) public social media accounts, saying that Queen is, according to Love, a man, and criticizing Queen for some comments that Queen had directed at Rene Perez, singer for hip-hop duo Calle 13.

Love was also formerly friends with Pedro Julio Serrano but in 2012, she criticized him and rap singer Lisa M as well, apparently for a demonstration they held at a Puerto Rican restaurant, declaring that "In Puerto Rico, people think that the (LGBT) community's opinion is Pedro Julio Serrano's opinion and that is totally false. And, I don't hold anything against Mr. Pedro Julio Serrano. I don't have any type of negative feelings (towards Serrano), nor hate, nor resentment. I overcame that because I wasn't the one who betrayed our friendship, he is the one who betrayed this (public) servant (Love), but I forgave him and moved on", she wrote on her social pages.

She has been interviewed in a number of Puerto Rican television shows such as Pedro Zervigon's "Al Grano", where she discussed her past imitating Puerto Rican singers Yolandita Monge and Olga Tanon as well as Mexican singer Thalia (in Thalia's characterization of "Maria la del Barrio"), as well as working in productions with father-and-son duo Tommy and Rafo Muniz, Silverio Perez, Antonio Pantojas and others.

During 2019, she was again involved in controversy, when she declared to Puerto Rican media that murdered gay Puerto Rican hip-hopper Kevin Fret had a crush on another hip-hopper, Puerto Rican singer Ozuna.

=== Acting ===
Love has also been featured as a comedic actress in some television sketches, including on a Raymond Arrieta show, "Raymond y sus Amigos", where she played a version of herself.

== Personal life ==
Love moved to New York, New York.

== See also ==
- List of Puerto Ricans
- Felicia Garza
