= Entre Nosotras =

Puerto Rican variety morning show

- Entre Nosotras - Puerto Rican TV Show 2007
- Starring: Alba Nydia Díaz; Wanda Sais; Sonia Valentin; Linette Torres
- Country of origin: Puerto Rico

Production
- Producer: Sonia Valentin
- Running time: 90 mins.

Original release
- Network: WAPA-TV / WAPA America
- Release: June 11, 2007 – February 19, 2016

Related
- Juntos En La Mañana 2016-2017 (replacement); Despierta America (Univision)

"Entre Nosotras" is a variety morning show that aired on WAPA-TV from June 11, 2007 to February 19, 2016. It was hosted by an ensemble of Puerto Rican actresses: Alba Nydia Díaz, Sonia Valentin, Linette Torres and Wanda Sais. Their daily show covers news stories of interest to the general public, from a female point of view.

== Show history ==
Initially "Entre Nosotras" was hosted by Maria del Carmen Gonzalez, and Gladys Rodriguez. Maricarmen Avilés joined the group after being encouraged to do so by Díaz, Valentín and Noris Joffre.

The show's biggest rival is "Despierta America" on Univision.

== See also ==
- WAPA-TV
- WAPA America
