= Guillermo Venegas Lloveras =

Puerto Rican songwriter

- Born: October 12, 1915; Quebradillas, Puerto Rico
- Died: July 23, 1993 (aged 63); Santurce, Puerto Rico
- Occupation: songwriter

Guillermo Segundo Venegas Lloveras (Quebradillas, Puerto Rico October 12, 1915 – Santurce, Puerto Rico July 23, 1993) was a Puerto Rican songwriter. After success in his youth with popular boleros, waltzes, tangos, marches, and danzas, in later life he returned to classical music. A two-hour television program was produced by Puerto Rico Lyric Theatre director Jesús Quiñones Ledesma (otherwise known by stage name as the operatic tenor Ricardo Ledesma). After his death the rights to his songs were disputed.

Guillermo Venegas Lloveras died of stomach cancer on July 23, 1993 at Pavia Hospital in Santurce, Puerto Rico.

== Works ==
- Génesis (Lucecita Benítez song) 1969
