= Guillermo Torres (songwriter) =

Puerto Rican music producer

Juan Guillermo Torres - Colon, known professionally as Guillermo Torres or Guillermo Torres Productor (born June 26, 1966) is an American music, television, and movie producer, and songwriter. He has worked for Sony and Universal Music. He produced, directed and arranged music for artists including Chayanne, Manny Manuel, Olga Tañon, Bonny Cepeda, Toño Rosario, Sergio George, Lourdes Robles, Victor Manuelle, Yolandita Monge, Andy Montañez, Ashley (La Chica Bomba).

== Early life ==
Torres was born in Chicago, Illinois.

== Career ==
Torres has contributed as a producer and consultant in programs such as Dame a Break, El Show de Eddie Miró (Noche de Gala), Que Noche, Santo Domingo Contigo, Magazin Cubano, Bombazo Latino, Factor Suerte, and Operacion Chef for Telemundo. As an event producer, he worked with artists such as Hilary Duff, Jonas Brothers, Luis Enrique, Guillermo Davila and Belinda. Projects such as Navidad Boricua, Grupo KAOS (band where he was also a singer) are recognized in Puerto Rico.

He contributed as a writer in programs such as Dame a Break, Bombazo Latino and operation chief for Telemundo, and as a writer for other projects. In 2020 he started writing screenplays. Electric (2020) and Sylvia (2022), are screenplays in production.

== Recognition ==
- Ascap Awards
- Premios Lo Nuestro
- Premios Tu Musica
- Paoli Award
- Suncoast Regional Emmy Award in non-news program writing (1996)
