= Mary Ann (album) =

Studio album by Mary Ann Acevedo
- Released: October 31, 2006
- Recorded: 2006 (see locations and studios)
- Genres: Latin pop, pop
- Length: 34:40
- Labels: Univision Music Group; La Calle Records
- Producers: George Zamora (executive); Guillermo Torres (co-exec)

Mary Ann Acevedo chronology
Mary Ann (2006)	Cántale a tu Bebé (2009)

Singles from Mary Ann
- 1. "Mirame" Released: September 16, 2006; 2. "Que Ironía" Released: January 20, 2007; 3. "Débil" Released: August 12, 2007

Mary Ann is the first studio album recorded by Puerto Rican singer Mary Ann Acevedo. The first single of this album are Mírame (English: Look at me).

== Track listing ==
Standard Edition
No.	Title	Composer:	Length
1.	"Mírame"	Guillermo Torres	3:38
2.	"Que Ironía"	Eduardo Reyes, Camarena	3:28
3.	"Prueba Mi Amor"	Guillermo Torres	2:56
4.	"En Mí"	Tairon Aguilera	3:13
5.	"Todo Eres Tú"	Guillermo Torres	3:38
6.	"El Amor"	Guillermo Torres	3:14
7.	"Ante Dios Y El Amor (Juntos)"	Rodolfo Barreras	3:49
8.	"Débil"	Rudy Pérez, Omar Sánchez	3:42
9.	"Abro las Alas"	Wilson Ramón Torres	3:40
10.	"Si No Estas Aquí"	Sergio George, Jorge Luis Chacin	3:14

Bonus Tracks
No.	Title	Composer:	Length
11.	"Mírame" (Merengue Version)	Guillermo Torres	3:38

Notes

- Track listing and credits from album booklet.

== Singles ==
- "Mirame" is the first single from Mary Ann's first studio album. The song was written by Guillermo Torres, produced by Bob Benozzo and recorded in Altavoz Studio and Lele Studio at Italy. This is the story of a woman, who need to let know her man, that she loves him, she need him more than ever, that she can't live without him and reminded each time they have lived together. Here the woman expresses the infinite love totally to Him, so deep is their love which goes to where the sun touches the sea. Wishing well to recover each minute of their lives and their love re-emerge among them as the first time. On May 2, 2009 Mary Ann Acevedo sang this song, in a duet with Hannaní Peraza, and they had a "standing ovation" of the people, this is the first time that the song "Mirame", is presented on the stage of Objetivo Fama. This song has a new version, the "merengue version". The song can only be obtained through digital download on Mary Ann Fan Club's website; this song was not included on the album as official track, it is a bonus track.
- "Que Ironía", written by Eduardo Reyes, Camarena and produced by Guillermo Torres is the second single of this debut album. The music video was released on January 19, 2007 in a worldwide television premiere on Anda Pa'l Cara, a television show on Univisión Puerto Rico. Also the music video was recorded on the studio of APC at Guaynabo, Puerto Rico.
- "Débil" (Spanish for "Weak") is the third single from Mary Ann's first studio album. Débil was written by Rudy Pérez and Omar Sánchez and it was previously a "hit" by Yolandita Monge off the album "Vivencias" in 1988.

== Release history ==
Region	Date	Label	Format
Puerto Rico	October 31, 2006	Univision Music	Digital Download
Puerto Rico	November 1, 2006	Univision Music	Compact disc

== Personnel ==
- Vocals: Mary Ann Acevedo
- Background vocals: Mirna Vale, Nashali Enchautegui, Junny Ramos, Rawy Torres, Tairon Aguilera, Danilo Ballo, Cinzia Astolfi, Eddie Tomas, Jeannie Cruz
- Keyboards: Martin Nieves, Guillermo Torres, Bob Benozzo, Maurizio Campo
- Bass: Ricky Encarnacion, Francesco Puglisi
- Guitar: Jorge Laboy, Andres Castro, Simone Chivilo, Davide Aru, Rawy Torres, Tairon
- Violin: Karlo Flores, Zeida Garcia, Fernando Medina, Juan Carlos Menendez, Yahaira O'Neill, Lilibeth Rivera, Sandra Rodriguez, Frank Torres, Andres Valcarcel
- Viola: Emanuel Olivieri, Marta Hernandez, Maria Santiago
- Cello: Harry Almodovar, Sheila Ortiz
- Drums: Efrain Martinez, Lele Melotti, Luca Tricoli
- Percussion: Jhon Pierre Lamoutt
- Hammond Organ: Jose Nelson

=== Production ===
- Executive Producer: George Zamora, Guillermo Torres
- Associates Producers: Sergio George, Ramon Martinez, Carlos Velazquez, Bob Benozzo, Rawy Torres, Eduardo Reyes
- Mastering: Roberto "IL MAC" Maccagno (REM Studio, Italy)
- Engineers: Ramon Martinez, Carlos Velazquez, Marteen, Israel "PT" Nijera, Sabino Cannone, Bob Benozzo, Danilo Ballo, Mauricio Campo, George Mena
- Recorded and Mixed: Playbach Recording, La Casa Studios
- Photography: Edwin David Cordero
- Art Direction and design: Wewx Collazo (Arte Grafico &..)
- Stylist: Juan Angel Pacheco
- Makeup: Juan Angel Pacheco

== Locations and studios ==
Recording locations and studios included:

- Altavox Studio - (Milan, Italy)
- Lele Studio - (Velate, Italy)
- Zone Productions - (Miami, FL)
- Audio Vision Recording Studios - (Miami, FL)
- REM Studio - (Bra, Italy)
- Love House Music - (New Jersey)
