= Los Favoritos =

Puerto Rican pop group

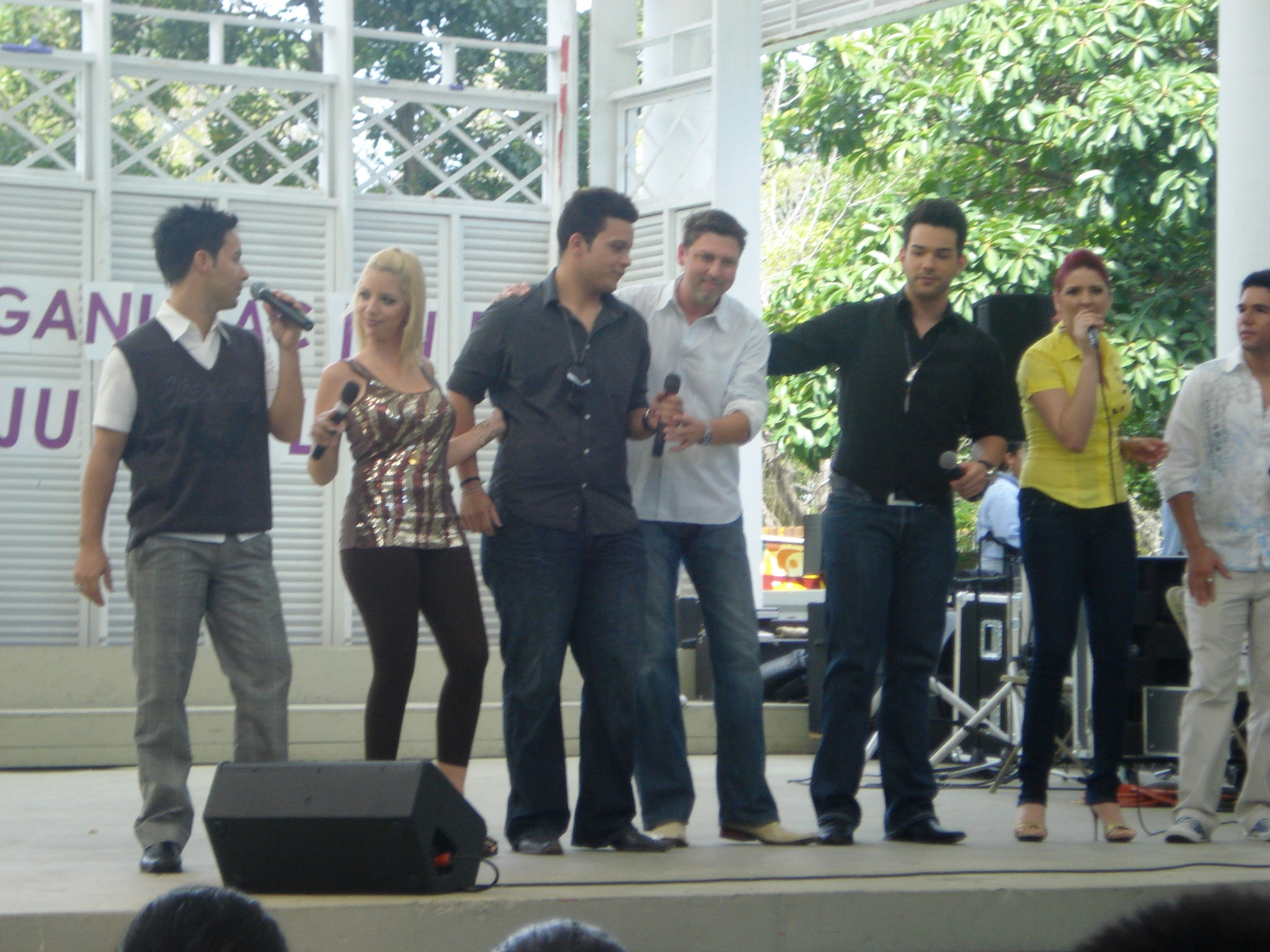
- "Los Favoritos" singing in the Luis Muñoz Rivera Park.

Background information
- Origin: Puerto Rico
- Genres: Pop
- Years active: 2008–2009
- Labels: GT Music; producer: Francisco Zamora; Guillermo Torres
- Members: Francisco Zamora (2008-2009); Mary Ann Acevedo (2008-2009); Arquímides Gonzalez (2008-2009); Blanca Rosa (2008-2009); Ediberto Carmenatty (2008-2009); Jometh Andujar (2008-2009)
- Past members: Luz María (2008); Javier Baerga Schroeder (2008); Jonathan Ríos (2008-2009)
- Website: Official Website

Los Favoritos is a Puerto Rican pop group that formed in 2008, which consisted of eight former participants from Objetivo Fama—Arquímides, Blanca Rosa, Ediberto, Javier Baerga Schroeder, Jometh, Jonathan, Luz Maria, and Mary Ann Acevedo—and Francisco Zamora. Baerga and Luz Maria would later leave the group to record their solo albums.

== Los Favoritos: The Show ==
"Los Favoritos: The Show" was produced by Francisco Zamora, Karlo Cabrera, and Guillermo Torres. Danny Lugo was the choreographer. The program's target audience was the general public and families.

On January 25, 2009, "Los Favoritos" presented a concert in the Coliseo Ruben Rodriguez at Bayamon, Puerto Rico, in the continuation of the concert tour in 2008–2009.

=== Tour ===
Los Favoritos en Concierto
- Tour by Los Favoritos
- Promotional poster for Los Favoritos' concert
- Associated album: Tu Favorito
- Start date: September 14, 2008
- End date: August 8, 2009
- Legs: 1
- No. of shows: 7

| Date | City | Country | Venue |
|---|---|---|---|
North America
| September 14, 2008 | San Juan | Puerto Rico | Luis A. Ferré Performing Arts Center |
| October 30, 2008 | San Juan | Puerto Rico | Luis Muñoz Rivera Park |
| October 31, 2008 | Cabo Rojo | Puerto Rico | Plaza Pública |
| November 22, 2008 | Hato Rey | Puerto Rico | Hiram Bithorn Stadium |
| December 4, 2008 | Hato Rey | Puerto Rico | Plaza Las Americas |
| January 25, 2009 | San Juan | Puerto Rico | Roberto Clemente Coliseum |
| August 8, 2009 | San Juan | Puerto Rico | Plaza Colon - Old San Juan |

== Special Presentations ==
On October 30, 2008, parts of "Los Favoritos" were presented in the "Pabellón de la Paz" in San Juan. Mary Ann Acevedo, Arquimides, Ediberto, Blanca Rosa, Jonathan, Jometh, and Francisco Zamora did a spoof on the official theme of their show in "El Segundo Encuentro de Organizaciones Juveniles de Puerto Rico" (hosted by the OAJ - "Oficina de Asuntos de la Juventud").

"Los Favoritos" was presented on November 22, 2008, in "El Pulguero de las Christmas" at the parking lot of Estadio Hiram Bithorn at Hato Rey, Puerto Rico. That same day, "Los Favoritos" appeared at Cabo Rojo, Puerto Rico, in the reception for Miss Puerto Rico Universe 2009, Mayra Matos.

== Discography ==
EP

- Tu Favorito (2008)

== See also ==
- Objetivo Fama
- Mary Ann Acevedo
