= Objetivo Fama season 1 =

Televised Puerto Rican talent show competition

Objetivo Fama
- Season 1
- Hosted by: Luis Enrique
- Judges: Roberto Sueiro
- Winner: Janina Irizarry
- Runner-up: Sheila Romero
- Finals venue: Teatro del Parque, Santurce

Release
- Original network: Univision Puerto Rico
- Original release: January 31 – April 24, 2004

Season chronology
- Next → Season 2

The first season of Objetivo Fama began in 2004. The season featured a varying panel of judges, including Roberto Sueiro, who is the only remaining judge of the original season. The show was hosted by Nicaraguan singer Luis Enrique.

== Auditions ==
Auditions were held in several towns and cities of Puerto Rico.

=== Final Cutdown ===
Out of each audition, a group 18 contestants were selected. This was the only season to feature only Puerto Rican contestants.

The 18 selected contestants, in alphabetical order, were:

#	Contestant	Hometown	Age*
1	Alex Soto	Adjuntas, Puerto Rico	28
2	Charlie Rodríguez	San Juan, Puerto Rico	24
3	Daniel Rodríguez	Toa Alta, Puerto Rico	19
4	Dominic Padilla	Cabo Rojo, Puerto Rico	22
5	Ektor Rivera	Bayamón, Puerto Rico	26
6	Elliot Suro	Trujillo Alto, Puerto Rico	19
7	Encarnita "Kany" García	Toa Baja, Puerto Rico	21
8	Héctor Gotay	Toa Baja, Puerto Rico	24
9	Janayra Reyes	Toa Baja, Puerto Rico	22
10	Janina Irizarry	Lajas, Puerto Rico	20
11	Jencelamary Rivera	Carolina, Puerto Rico	21
12	Juan "Tony" Cordero	Isabela, Puerto Rico	21
13	Lizzette Medina	Utuado, Puerto Rico	27
14	Luis Montes	Humacao, Puerto Rico	21
15	Natalia Acosta	Bayamón, Puerto Rico	21
8	Sheila Romero	Hatillo, Puerto Rico	20
17	Yaddeliz Martínez	San Sebastián, Puerto Rico	22
18	Zania Sala	Guaynabo, Puerto Rico	20

* Age was taken at the beginning of the contest (2004)

== Controversies ==
- Kany García was the first contestant eliminated from the show, due to a car accident she had after the first show. However, she recovered and has launched a successful career as a singer and songwriter.
- Natalia Acosta was also eliminated from the show to a throat illness.

== After the Show ==
- Season winner Janina Irizarry has released three moderately successful albums: Todo De Mí (2005), Contra La Corriente (2006), and Janina (2009)
- Second finalist Sheila Romero has also released three albums: Mucho Más por Vivir (2007), En Tus Manos (2009), and Fiel (2013)
- Third finalist Ektor released his first album titled Un Paso del Amor in 2005. After that, he has turned his career towards acting and painting.
- Fourth finalist Daniel Rodríguez and fellow contestants Luis Montes and Elliot Suro, joined Lorenzo Duarte in MDO. They released two successful albums together: Otra Vez (2005) and Sabe A Tí (2008).
- After recovering from her accident, Kany García has become a successful singer and songwriter, even writing songs to the shows winner, Janina. In 2007, she released her first album titled Cualquier Dia on which she won two Billboard Latin Music Awards and two Latin Grammys for Best New Artist and Best Female Pop Vocal Album. She has released two more albums: Boleto de Entrada (2009) and Kany Garcia (2012)
- Charlie Rodríguez was the first contestant to release an album with Color Secreto, in 2005.
- Héctor Gotay released a gospel album in 2007.
