= Janina (disambiguation) =

Janina may refer to:

- Alternative name for Ioannina, a Greek city
- Janina (album)
- Janina (given name), a female name (predominantly Polish)
- Janina (telenovela), Mexican telenovela
- Janina, Łódź Voivodeship (central Poland)
- Janina, Świętokrzyskie Voivodeship (south-central Poland)
- Janina coat of arms
- Janina Irizarry, Puerto Rican singer
- 383 Janina, a main belt asteroid

== See also ==
- Jónína, Icelandic name
