= The Voice Dominicana season 1 =

The Voice Dominicana
- Season 1
- Hosted by: Luz García; Jhoel López
- Coaches: Juan Magán; Milly Quezada; Nacho; Musicólogo The Libro
- Winner: Yohan Amparo
- Winning coach: Milly Quezada

Release
- Original network: Telesistema 11
- Original release: July 4 – October 31, 2021

The first season of Dominican reality television series, The Voice Dominicana, premiered on 4 July 2021, on Telesistema 11. Juan Magán, Milly Quezada, Nacho and Musicólogo The Libro were announced as coaches for the first season. Luz García and Jhoel López co-presented the show.

== Coaches and hosts ==
Coaches and host of The Voice Dominicana

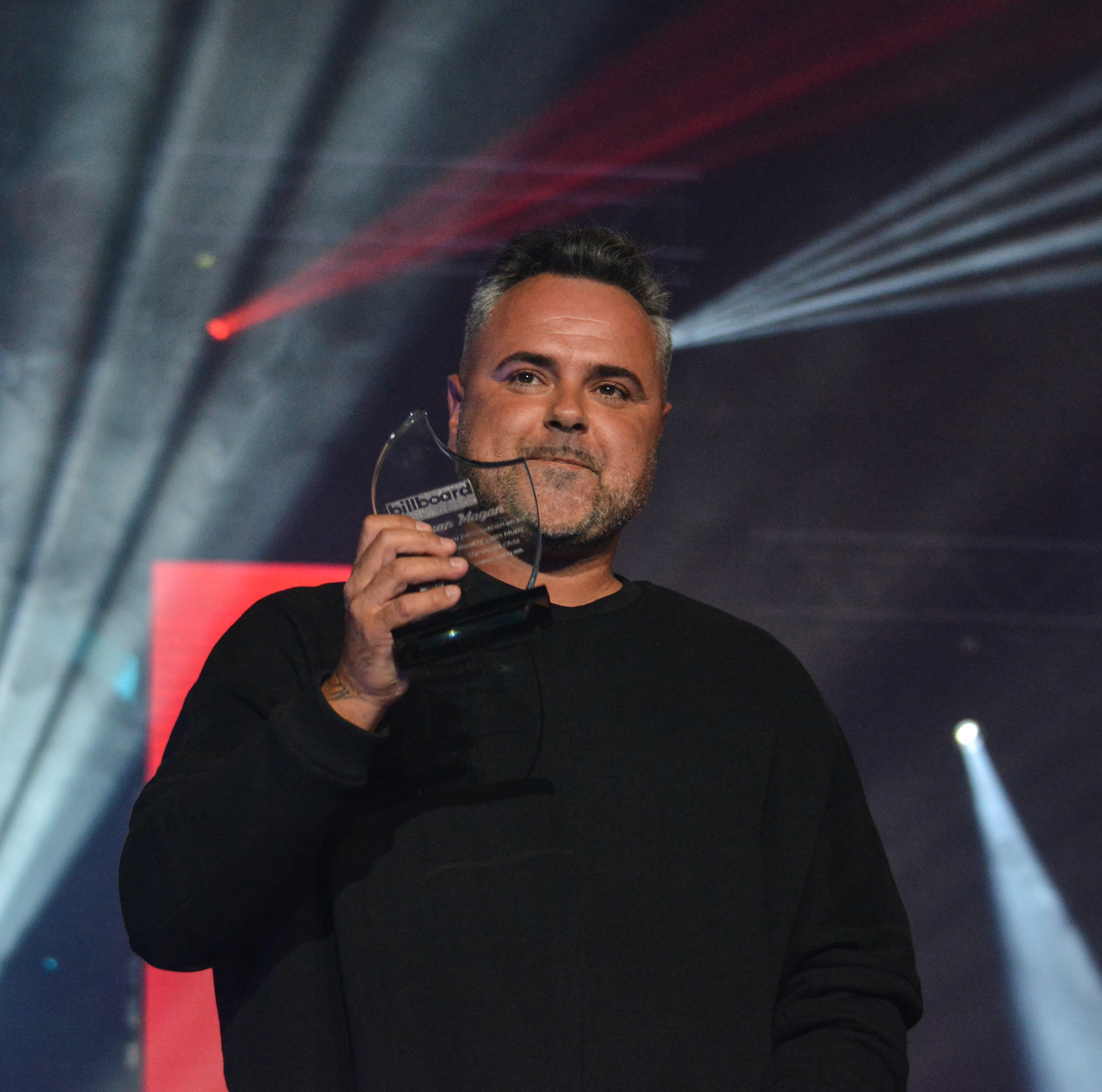
Juan Magán

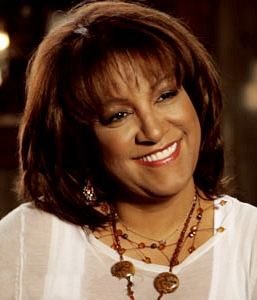
Milly Quezada

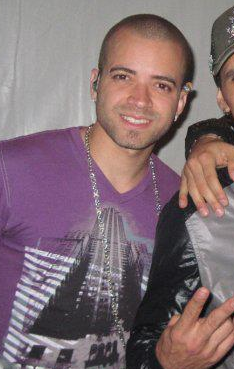
Nacho

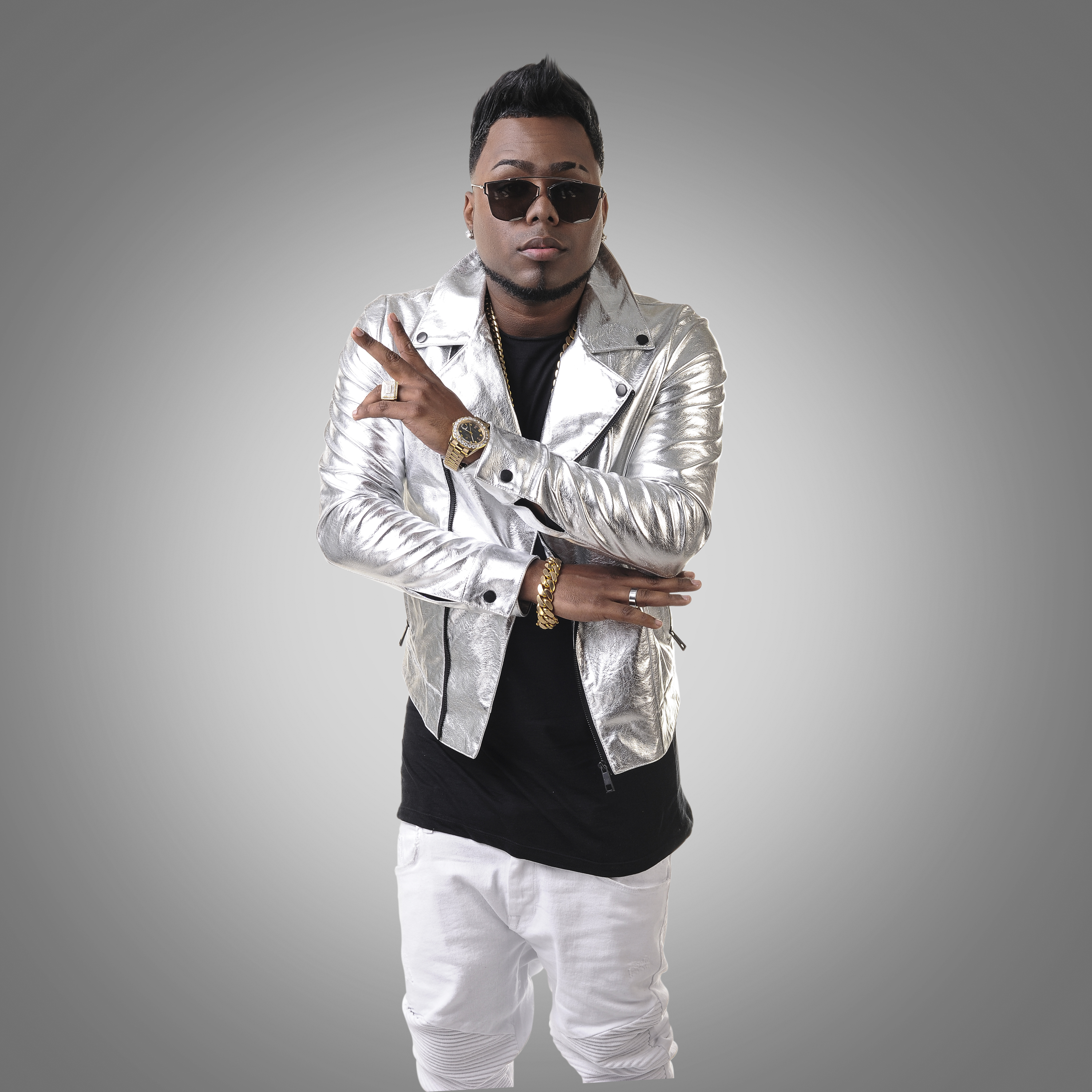
Musicologo The Libro

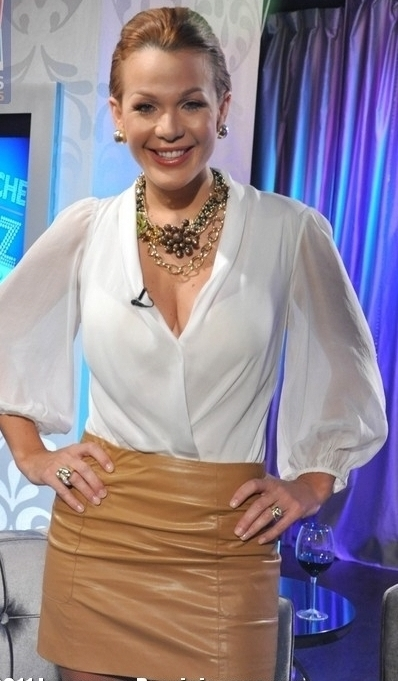
Luz García

On 7 October 2020, it was announced that Luz García was the presenter of the show. Jhoel López is the season's second presenter, as the social media correspondent.

On 8 October 2020, three coaches of the show were announced with them being Juan Magán, Milly Quezada and Nacho. Musicologo The Libro was the final coach announced during the grand launch of the show.

== Teams ==
Teams color key
Winner	Eliminated in the Live Shows
Runner-up	Eliminated in the Knockouts
Third place	Stolen by another coach in the Battles
Fourth place	Eliminated in the Battles
Eliminated in the Semi-Final

Coach	Top 56 artists				
Musicólogo					
Musicólogo	Alex Suarez	Herminia Tavarez	Scarlet Reyes	Denitza Gonzales	Jhoan Sosa
Musicólogo	Geoffrey de la Cruz	Luis Salazar	Genesis Reyes	Rikelvin García	Claudia Stammegna
Musicólogo	Jose Esteban Suarez	Endry Paz	Rosel Guzman	Nahomie Cedano	Elsie Cruz
Nacho					
Nacho	Chrushman Saul	Liz Mena	Génesis Cespedes	Estefania Marcano	Ayluin Castro
Nacho	Edwin Marcelino	Fernando Guzman	Misael Chacón	~~Danyllo Silviera~~	Natalia Liranzo
Nacho	David Capiello	Wandy Santana	Vicky Della Peruta	Helen Mejia	Daniel Moreno
Milly Quezada					
Milly Quezada	Yohann Amparo	Elizabeth Suarez	Geomar Bastardo	Eddy Junnior	Carlos Gil
Milly Quezada	Casandra Felipe	Victor Pintor	Donabel Aquino	~~Luis Salasar~~	~~Liz Mena~~
Milly Quezada	Saúl Nicolas	Jisselle Mota	Rafael Paz	Julio Galán	Carmen Elena
Juan Magán					
Juan Magán	Ariel Assad	Ivan Pichardo	Gildania Santiago	Lia Mencia	Angel Zabala
Juan Magán	Miguel Tineo	Sangi Jimenez	Danyllo Silviera	~~Eddy Junnior~~	Randy Aybar
Juan Magán	Elizabeth Corporan	Wilkin Cabrera	Axa Derizan	Miguel Sánchez	Senei Sanchez
Note: Italicized names are stolen artists (names struck through within former teams).

== Blind auditions ==
Blind auditions colour key
✔	Coach pressed "QUIERO TU VOZ" button
	Artist defaulted to this coach's team
	Artist elected to join this coach's team
	Artist eliminated with no coach pressing his or her "QUIERO TU VOZ" button
	Artist Received an "All Turn"

- The coaches performed "Con Tu Voz" during the premiere of the show.

Blind auditions results
Episode	Order	Artist	Song	Coach's and artist's choices			
Episode	Order	Artist	Song	Musicólogo	Nacho	Milly	Juan Magán
Episode 1 (July 4, 2021)	1	Jhoan Sosa	"Dominicano Soy"	✔	✔	–	✔
Episode 1 (July 4, 2021)	2	Natalia Liranzo	"No Te Irás"	✔	✔	✔	–
Episode 1 (July 4, 2021)	3	Miguel Sánchez	"Esta Ausencia"	✔	✔	✔	✔
Episode 1 (July 4, 2021)	4	Wandy Santana	"Bailando"	–	✔	✔	–
Episode 1 (July 4, 2021)	5	Tiare Marte	"No Me Acuerdo"	–	–	–	–
Episode 1 (July 4, 2021)	6	Ramón Pérez	"América"	–	–	–	–
Episode 1 (July 4, 2021)	7	Eddy Junnior	"Oye"	✔	✔	✔	✔
Episode 1 (July 4, 2021)	8	Liz Mena	"I Will Always Love You"	✔	✔	✔	✔
Episode 1 (July 4, 2021)	9	Elsie Cruz	"Así No Te Amará Jamás"	✔	–	–	–
Episode 2 (July 11)	1	Denitza Gonzales	"Para Darte Mi Vida"	✔	✔	✔	✔
Episode 2 (July 11)	2	Luis Salazar	"La Quiero a Morir"	–	✔	✔	✔
Episode 2 (July 11)	3	Génesis Cespedes	"Creo En Mi"	✔	✔	✔	–
Episode 2 (July 11)	4	Saúl Nicolas	"Te Di"	–	–	✔	–
Episode 2 (July 11)	5	Axa Derizan	"Because You Loved Me"	–	–	–	✔
Episode 2 (July 11)	6	Génesis Junior	"Que Lloro"	–	–	–	–
Episode 2 (July 11)	7	Alex Suarez	"Mil Maneras"	✔	✔	✔	–
Episode 2 (July 11)	8	Elizabeth Suarez	"No Querías Lastimarme"	✔	✔	✔	✔
Episode 2 (July 11)	9	Yelizabeth Santos	"Dile Que Me Quieres"	–	–	–	–
Episode 2 (July 11)	10	Franklin Stubs	"Tu Voz"	–	–	–	–
Episode 3 (July 18)	1	Scarlet Reyes	"Corre, Corre"	✔	✔	–	✔
Episode 3 (July 18)	2	Chrushman Saul	"Me Voy Enamorando"	✔	✔	–	–
Episode 3 (July 18)	3	Victor Pintor	"Jailhouse Rock"	–	–	✔	–
Episode 3 (July 18)	4	Estefania Marcano	"Es Cosa de El"	✔	✔	✔	✔
Episode 3 (July 18)	5	Franklin Collado	"Ya Me Enteré"	–	–	–	–
Episode 3 (July 18)	6	Ivan Pichardo	"No Me Doy por Vencido"	–	–	–	✔
Episode 3 (July 18)	7	Jose Hernandez	"La Nave del Olvido"	–	–	–	–
Episode 3 (July 18)	8	Helen Mejia	"En Tus Manos"	✔	✔	–	–
Episode 3 (July 18)	9	Misael Chacón	"When a Man Loves a Woman"	✔	✔	✔	✔
Episode 4 (July 25)	1	Danyllo Silveira	"What's Up?"	✔	✔	✔	✔
Episode 4 (July 25)	2	Dominique Aristy	"Rise Up"	–	–	–	–
Episode 4 (July 25)	3	Johan Taveras	"Volveré"	–	–	–	–
Episode 4 (July 25)	4	Geoffrey de la Cruz	"Hawái"	✔	–	✔	–
Episode 4 (July 25)	5	Claudia Stammegna	"Se Fue"	✔	–	–	–
Episode 4 (July 25)	6	Angel Zabala	"Contigo en la Distancia"	–	–	–	✔
Episode 4 (July 25)	7	Donabel Aquino	"Aleluyah"	–	–	✔	–
Episode 4 (July 25)	8	Ayluin Castro	"Tu Eres Mi Reina"	–	✔	–	–
Episode 4 (July 25)	9	Herminia Tavarez	"Yo Sin Él"	✔	✔	–	✔
Episode 5 (August 1)	1	Riekelvin García	"Mientes"	✔	–	✔	–
Episode 5 (August 1)	2	Yerson Metivier	"Medicina de Amor"	–	–	–	–
Episode 5 (August 1)	3	Jisselle Mota	"Ángel"	–	–	✔	–
Episode 5 (August 1)	4	Miguel Tineo	"Se Preparó"	–	–	–	✔
Episode 5 (August 1)	5	Randy Aybar	"¿Y cómo es él?"	–	✔	–	✔
Episode 5 (August 1)	6	Julio Galán	"Cómo"	–	✔	✔	✔
Episode 5 (August 1)	7	Jean Pierre Romelus	"A Mi Manera"	–	–	–	–
Episode 5 (August 1)	8	Elizabeth Corporan	"Como Yo Te Amo"	–	✔	–	✔
Episode 5 (August 1)	9	Jazmín Tejada	"Ecos De Amor"	–	–	–	–
Episode 5 (August 1)	10	David Capielo	"Nessun dorma"	✔	✔	–	✔
Episode 6 (August 8)	1	Edwin Marcelino	"Almohada"	✔	✔	✔	✔
Episode 6 (August 8)	2	Christopher de la Cruz	"La Camisa Negra"	–	–	–	–
Episode 6 (August 8)	3	Lia Mencia	"Puño de Diamantes"	–	–	–	✔
Episode 6 (August 8)	4	Geomar Bastardo	"Sombras... ¡Nada Más!"	–	–	✔	–
Episode 6 (August 8)	5	Nahomie Cedano	"Love on the Brain"	✔	–	–	–
Episode 6 (August 8)	6	Eribel Garcia	"Quieres Ser Mi Amante?"	–	–	–	–
Episode 6 (August 8)	7	Rosel Guzman	"Te Amo Demasiado"	✔	–	–	–
Episode 6 (August 8)	8	Yohan Amparo	"Vuelve"	–	–	✔	–
Episode 6 (August 8)	9	Jahaira Castro	"Si Tú Eres Mi Hombre"	–	–	–	–
Episode 6 (August 8)	10	Fernando Guzman	"Lovumba"	✔	✔	✔	✔
Episode 7 (August 15)	1	Senei Sanchez	"En Filita Cooperando"	–	–	–	✔
Episode 7 (August 15)	2	Carmen Elena	"No One"	✔	✔	✔	✔
Episode 7 (August 15)	3	Vicky Dela Peruta	"Lo Que Son Las Cosas"	–	✔	–	–
Episode 7 (August 15)	4	Delila Saint-Louis	"La Gata Bajo La Lluvia"	–	–	–	–
Episode 7 (August 15)	5	Jose Esteban Suarez	"Carmesi"	✔	–	–	–
Episode 7 (August 15)	6	Casandra Felipe	"Pero Me Acuerdo de Ti"	–	–	✔	–
Episode 7 (August 15)	7	Francisco Berroa	"Dígale"	–	–	–	–
Episode 7 (August 15)	8	Faryala Yssa	"Quisqueya"	–	–	–	–
Episode 7 (August 15)	9	Wilkin Cabrera	"El Triste"	–	–	–	✔
Episode 7 (August 15)	10	Ariel Assad	"Él Me Mintió"	✔	✔	–	✔
Episode 8 (August 22)	1	Sangi Jimenez	"La Mejor Versión de Mí"	✔	✔	–	✔
Episode 8 (August 22)	2	Eudy De La Cruz	"Todo Aquello Que Escribi"	–	–	–	–
Episode 8 (August 22)	3	Rafael Paz	"Malagueña Salerosa"	✔	–	✔	–
Episode 8 (August 22)	4	Endry Paz	"La Bikina"	✔	–	–	–
Episode 8 (August 22)	5	Gildania Santiago	"Volver a Amar"	–	–	–	✔
Episode 8 (August 22)	6	Genesis Reyes	"Yo te Extrañaré"	✔	✔	–	Team full
Episode 8 (August 22)	7	Daniel Moreno	"Andas en Mi Cabeza"	Team full	✔	–	Team full
Episode 8 (August 22)	8	Alexandra Azcona	"Al Final"	Team full	Team full	–	Team full
Episode 8 (August 22)	9	Carlos Gil	"Que Precio Tiene El Cielo"	Team full	Team full	✔	Team full

== Battles ==
The recordings of the battles were done on the last week of July and premiered on August 29. The advisors for this season were Yiyo Sarante for Team Magán, Johnny Ventura for Team Milly, Miriam Cruz for Team Nacho, and Mark B. for Team Musicólogo. In this round, each coach pairs two team members to perform together and then chooses one to advance in the competition. The coaches also have the power to steal one contestant from another team in the whole round.

Battles color key
Artist won the Battle and advanced to the Knockouts
Artist lost the Battle, but was stolen by another coach, and, advanced to the Knockouts
Artist lost the Battle and was eliminated

Battles results
Episode	Order	Coach	Winner	Song	Loser	'Steal' result			
Episode	Order	Coach	Winner	Song	Loser	Musi-cólogo	Nacho	Milly	Magán
Episode 9 (August 29)	1	Milly	Casandra Felipe	"En Cambio No"	Carmen Elena	–	–	—N/a	–
Episode 9 (August 29)	2	Nacho	Chrushman Saul	"Duele el Corazón"	Daniel Moreno	–	—N/a	–	–
Episode 9 (August 29)	3	Musicólogo	Herminia Tavarez	"Quizás"	Elsie Cruz	—N/a	–	–	–
Episode 9 (August 29)	4	Magán	Lia Mencia	"Quién como tú"	Eddy Junnior	–	✔	✔	—N/a
Episode 9 (August 29)	5	Musicólogo	Scarlet Reyes	"New Rules"	Nahomie Cedano	—N/a	–	Steal used	–
Episode 9 (August 29)	6	Milly	Yohann Amparo	"Te Hubieras Ido Antes"	Julio Galán	–	–	Steal used	–
Episode 9 (August 29)	7	Nacho	Estefania Marcano	"Buscandos Tus Besos"	Helen Mejia	–	—N/a	Steal used	–
Episode 10 (September 5)	1	Nacho	Genesis Cespedes	"Mas Buena"	Vicky Della Peruta	–	—N/a	Steal used	–
Episode 10 (September 5)	2	Milly	Geomar Bastardo	"Como Quien Pierde Una Estrella"	Rafael Paz	–	–	Steal used	–
Episode 10 (September 5)	3	Musicólogo	Alex Suarez	"Hasta Ayer"	Rosel Guzman	—N/a	–	Steal used	–
Episode 10 (September 5)	4	Magán	Miguel Tineo	"Meneando La Cola"	Senei Sanchez	–	–	Steal used	—N/a
Episode 10 (September 5)	5	Magán	Angel Miguel	"Vivir Sin Aire"	Miguel Angel Sanchez	–	–	Steal used	—N/a
Episode 10 (September 5)	6	Musicólogo	Genesis Reyes	"La Playa"	Endry Paz	—N/a	–	Steal used	–
Episode 10 (September 5)	7	Milly	Elizabeth Suarez	"Fuera De Mi Vida"	Liz Mena	✔	✔	Steal used	–
Episode 11 (September 12)	1	Magán	Sangi Jimenez	"If I Were a Boy"	Axa Derizan	–	Steal used	Steal used	—N/a
Episode 11 (September 12)	2	Musicólogo	Geoffrey De La Cruz	"Bachata Rosa"	Esteban Suarez	—N/a	Steal used	Steal used	–
Episode 11 (September 12)	3	Nacho	Ayluin Castro	"Amor Narcótico"	Wandy Santana	–	Steal used	Steal used	–
Episode 11 (September 12)	4	Magán	Ivan Pichardo	"Todo Cambió"	Wilkin Cabrera	–	Steal used	Steal used	—N/a
Episode 11 (September 12)	5	Nacho	Misael Chacon	"Don't Stop Believin'"	Danyllo Silviera	✔	Steal used	Steal used	✔
Episode 11 (September 12)	6	Milly	Victor Pintor	"Stand by Me"	Jiselle Mota	–	Steal used	Steal used	Steal used
Episode 11 (September 12)	7	Musicólogo	Denitza Gonzales	"Hasta Que Me Olvides"	Claudia Stammegna	—N/a	Steal used	Steal used	Steal used
Episode 12 (September 19)	1	Nacho	Fernando Guzman	"A Puro Dolor"	Natalia Liranzo	–	Steal used	Steal used	Steal used
Episode 12 (September 19)	2	Milly	Donabel Aquino	"La Gloria De Dios"	Saul Nivolas	–	Steal used	Steal used	Steal used
Episode 12 (September 19)	3	Magán	Gildania Santiago	"Te Ofrezco"	Elizabeth Corporan	–	Steal used	Steal used	Steal used
Episode 12 (September 19)	4	Musicólogo	Jhoan Sosa	"Si Entendieras"	Rikelvin Garcia	—N/a	Steal used	Steal used	Steal used
Episode 12 (September 19)	5	Milly	Carlos Gil	"Me Vas Extrañar"	Luis Salazar	✔	Steal used	Steal used	Steal used
Episode 12 (September 19)	6	Nacho	Edwin Marcelino	"Al Final Del Camino"	David Capiello	Steal used	Steal used	Steal used	Steal used
Episode 12 (September 19)	7	Magán	Ariel Assad	"Hace Dos Años y Un Día"	Randy Aybar	Steal used	Steal used	Steal used	Steal used

== Knockouts ==
The knockouts started being broadcast on Sunday, September 26. After the battles, each coach had eight contestants for the knockouts. The episodes featured two knockout pairings from each team. Each contestant sang a song of their own choice, and after each pairs' performances concluded, one is chosen by their coach to advance for the live shows.

Knockouts color key
Artist won the knockouts and advances to the Live shows
Artist lost the knockouts and was eliminated

Knockouts results
Episode	Coach	Order	Song	Artists		Song
Episode 13 (September 26	Musicólogo	1	"Hurt"	Scarlet Reyes	Génesis Reyes	"El Poder de Tu Amor"
Episode 13 (September 26	Musicólogo	2	"Que Alguien Me Diga"	Alex Suarez	Luis Salazar	"Y Hubo Alguien"
Episode 13 (September 26	Magán	3	"Para Adorarte"	Ivan Pichardo	Danyllo Silveira	"I Don't Want to Miss a Thing"
Episode 13 (September 26	Magán	4	"Perdón, Perdón"	Lia Mencia	Sangi	"Stone Cold"
Episode 13 (September 26	Milly	5	"Hasta Que Te Conocí"	Geomar Bastardo	Donabel Aquino	"Break Every Chain"
Episode 13 (September 26	Milly	6	"Cuan Grande Es Él"	Eddy Junior	Victor Pinto	"Valió La Pena"
Episode 13 (September 26	Nacho	7	"Never Enough"	Liz Mena	Misael Chacon	"I'm Not the Only One"
Episode 13 (September 26	Nacho	8	"Halo"	Genesis Cespedes	Fernando Guzman	"Dura"
Episode 14 (October 3)	Magán	1	"I Have Nothing"	Ariel Assad	Angel Zabala	"Lo Pasado, Pasado"
Episode 14 (October 3)	Magán	2	"Hello"	Gildania Santiago	Miguel Tineo	"Corazón"
Episode 14 (October 3)	Nacho	3	"If I Ain't Got You"	Estefania Marcano	Edwin Marcelino	"Me Va A Extrañar"
Episode 14 (October 3)	Nacho	4	"When I Was Your Man"	Chrushman Saul	Ayluin Castro	"Somos Novios"
Episode 14 (October 3)	Musicólogo	5	"Mujer Enamorada"	Herminia Tavarez	Geoffrey De La Cruz	"Propuesta Indecente"
Episode 14 (October 3)	Musicólogo	6	"Basta Ya"	Denitza Gonzalez	Jhoan Sosa	"El Nombre De Jesus"
Episode 14 (October 3)	Milly	7	"All of Me"	Yohann Amparo	Cassandra Felipe	"Hero"
Episode 14 (October 3)	Milly	8	"Mi Mayor Venganza"	Elizabeth Suarez	Carlos Gil	"Hoy Tengo Ganas de Ti"

== Live shows ==
Live shows color key
Artist was saved by public's vote
Artist was eliminated

=== Live Shows (October 10 & 17) ===
Playoffs results
Episode	Coach	Order	Artist	Song	Result
Episode 15 (Sunday, October 10, 2021)	Nacho	1	Estefania Marcano	"Quimbara"	Eliminated
Episode 15 (Sunday, October 10, 2021)	Nacho	2	Chrushman Saul	"You're Still the One"	Public's vote
Episode 15 (Sunday, October 10, 2021)	Nacho	3	Liz Mena	"Rolling in the Deep"	Public's vote
Episode 15 (Sunday, October 10, 2021)	Nacho	4	Génesis Cespedes	"Chandelier"	Public's vote
Episode 15 (Sunday, October 10, 2021)	Musicólogo	5	Denitza Gonzalez	"Es necesario"	Eliminated
Episode 15 (Sunday, October 10, 2021)	Musicólogo	6	Herminia Tavarez	"Como Tu Mujer"	Public's vote
Episode 15 (Sunday, October 10, 2021)	Musicólogo	7	Scarlet Reyes	"I Will Survive"	Public's vote
Episode 15 (Sunday, October 10, 2021)	Musicólogo	8	Alex Suarez	"Cómo He de Vivir Sin Tu Cariño"	Public's vote
Episode 15 (Sunday, October 10, 2021)	Milly Quezada	9	Elizabeth Suarez	"El Hombre que yo amo"	Public's vote
Episode 15 (Sunday, October 10, 2021)	Milly Quezada	10	Eddy Junior	"My Heart Will Go On"	Eliminated
Episode 15 (Sunday, October 10, 2021)	Milly Quezada	11	Geomar Bastardo	"De Mí Enamórate"	Public's vote
Episode 15 (Sunday, October 10, 2021)	Milly Quezada	12	Yohann Amparo	"Perfect"	Public's vote
Episode 15 (Sunday, October 10, 2021)	Juan Magan	13	Ariel Assad	"Aprendiz"	Public's vote
Episode 15 (Sunday, October 10, 2021)	Juan Magan	14	Lia Mencia	"Vas a quedarte"	Eliminated
Episode 15 (Sunday, October 10, 2021)	Juan Magan	15	Ivan Pichardo	"Inexplicable"	Public's vote
Episode 15 (Sunday, October 10, 2021)	Juan Magan	16	Gildania Santiago	"El Cigarillo"	Public's vote
Episode 16 (Sunday, October 17, 2021)	Milly Quezada	1	Yohann Amparo	"Solamente Tú"	Public's vote
Episode 16 (Sunday, October 17, 2021)	Milly Quezada	2	Elizabeth Suarez	"Nunca Voy a Olvidarte"	Public's vote
Episode 16 (Sunday, October 17, 2021)	Milly Quezada	3	Geomar Bastardo	"Por Ti Volaré"	Eliminated
Episode 16 (Sunday, October 17, 2021)	Juan Magan	4	Ivan Pichardo	"Cara a Cara"	Public's vote
Episode 16 (Sunday, October 17, 2021)	Juan Magan	5	Ariel Assad	"Fallin"	Public's vote
Episode 16 (Sunday, October 17, 2021)	Juan Magan	6	Gildania Santiago	"Un-Break My Heart"	Eliminated
Episode 16 (Sunday, October 17, 2021)	Musicólogo	7	Herminia Tavarez	"La Que Más Te Ama"	Public's vote
Episode 16 (Sunday, October 17, 2021)	Musicólogo	8	Scarlet Reyes	"Break Free"	Eliminated
Episode 16 (Sunday, October 17, 2021)	Musicólogo	9	Alex Suarez	"Enamorado de Ella"	Public's vote
Episode 16 (Sunday, October 17, 2021)	Nacho	10	Genesis Cespedes	"It's a Man's Man's Man's World"	Eliminated
Episode 16 (Sunday, October 17, 2021)	Nacho	11	Liz Mena	"Mucho Más Allá"	Public's vote
Episode 16 (Sunday, October 17, 2021)	Nacho	12	Chrushman Saul	"Like I'm Gonna Lose You"	Public's vote

Non-competition performances
Order	Performers	Song
16.1	Mozart La Para and Alcover	"El Barrio"

=== Semi-final (October 24) ===
Semi-final results
Episode	Coach	Order	Artist	Song	Result
Episode 17 (Sunday, October 24, 2021)	Juan Magan	1	Ivan Pichardo	"No Hay Mas Grande Amor"	Eliminated
Episode 17 (Sunday, October 24, 2021)	Juan Magan	2	Ariel Assad	"Sola Otra Vez"	Public's vote
Episode 17 (Sunday, October 24, 2021)	Milly Quezada	3	Yohan Amparo	"Entre Tu Cuerpo y El Mio"	Public's vote
Episode 17 (Sunday, October 24, 2021)	Milly Quezada	4	Elizabeth Suarez	"La Carnada"	Eliminated
Episode 17 (Sunday, October 24, 2021)	Nacho	5	Chrushman Saul	"You Say"	Public's vote
Episode 17 (Sunday, October 24, 2021)	Nacho	6	Liz Mena	"Girl on Fire"	Eliminated
Episode 17 (Sunday, October 24, 2021)	Musicólogo	7	Alex Suarez	"Vivir Asi Es Morir De Amor"	Public's vote
Episode 17 (Sunday, October 24, 2021)	Musicólogo	8	Herminia Tavarez	"Ya Te Olvido"	Eliminated

Non-competition performances
Order	Performer(s)	Song
17.1	Jandy Ventura El Legado	TBA
17.2	Lérica	TBA
17.3	Ross Maria and Juan Magán	TBA

=== Grand Finale (October 31) ===
Finale results
Episode	Coach	Order	Artist	Song	Result
Episode 18 (Sunday, October 31, 2021)	Milly Quezada	1	Yohan Amparo	"Feeling Good"	Winner
Episode 18 (Sunday, October 31, 2021)	Nacho	2	Chrushman Saul	"Corazón En La Maleta"	Runner-up
Episode 18 (Sunday, October 31, 2021)	Juan Magán	3	Ariel Assad	"Mi Realidad"	Third place
Episode 18 (Sunday, October 31, 2021)	Musicólogo	4	Alex Suarez	"La Incondicional"	Fourth place

Non-competition performances
Order	Performer(s)	Song
18.1	Eddy Herrera	Popurri
18.2	Musicólogo The Libro & Milly Quezada	Bum Bam Ven/En Filita Cooperando

== Elimination chart ==
=== Color key ===
Artist's info

- Team Musicólogo
- Team Nacho
- Team Milly
- Team Magán

Result details

- Winner
- Runner-up
- Third place
- Fourth place
- Saved by the public
- Eliminated

=== Overall ===
Results per week
Artists	Week 1	Week 2	Semi-final	Grand Finale
Yohann Amparo	Safe	Safe	Safe	Winner
Chrushman Saul	Safe	Safe	Safe	Runner-up
Ariel Assad	Safe	Safe	Safe	Third place
Alex Suarez	Safe	Safe	Safe	Fourth place
Herminia Tavarez	Safe	Safe	Eliminated	Eliminated (Semi-final)
Ivan Pichardo	Safe	Safe	Eliminated	Eliminated (Semi-final)
Liz Mena	Safe	Safe	Eliminated	Eliminated (Semi-final)
Elizabeth Suarez	Safe	Safe	Eliminated	Eliminated (Semi-final)
Scarlet Reyes	Safe	Eliminated	Eliminated (Week 2)	
Génesis Cespedes	Safe	Eliminated	Eliminated (Week 2)	
Geomar Bastardo	Safe	Eliminated	Eliminated (Week 2)	
Gildania Santiago	Safe	Eliminated	Eliminated (Week 2)	
Estefania Marcano	Eliminated	Eliminated (Week 1)		
Denitza Gonzales	Eliminated	Eliminated (Week 1)		
Lia Mencia	Eliminated	Eliminated (Week 1)		
Eddy Junnior	Eliminated	Eliminated (Week 1)		
