= Objetivo Fama season 2 =

Televised Puerto Rican talent show competition

Objetivo Fama
- Season 2
- Hosted by: Víctor Noriega; Yizette Cifredo
- Judges: Roberto Sueiro; Lissy Estrella
- Winner: Anaís Martínez
- Runner-up: Azucena Salazar
- Finals venue: Teatro del Parque, Santurce

Release
- Original network: Univision Puerto Rico
- Original release: February 5 – May 1, 2005

Season chronology
- ← Previous; Season 1 Next → Season 3

The second season of Objetivo Fama began in 2005. This season the judges are Roberto Sueiro, Hilda Ramos, and Fernando Allende. The show was hosted by Mexican actor/singer Victor Noriega and Puerto Rican celebrity Yizette Cifredo.

== Auditions ==
=== Final Cutdown ===
Out of each audition, a group of semi-finalists were selected. This was the first time that international contestants participated in the contest.

The 20 selected contestants were:

#	Contestant	Hometown	Nationality	Age*
1	Anaís Martínez		(Dominican Republic) Dominican	20
2	Angélica Pacheco		(Puerto Rico) Puerto Rican	24
3	Azucena Salazar		(Mexico) Mexican	18
4	Carlos Alberto Aldana		(Mexico) Mexican	
5	Carlos Rubén Salazar		(Mexico) Mexican	24
6	Carmen Rivera		(Puerto Rico) Puerto Rican	
7	Darla Delgado		(Puerto Rico) Puerto Rican	20
8	Emilio Acevedo		(Puerto Rico) Puerto Rican	18
9	Estéban Nuñez		(Puerto Rico) Puerto Rican	
10	Jayro Rosado		(Puerto Rico) Puerto Rican	20
11	Karol de Jesús		(Puerto Rico) Puerto Rican	19
12	Luis Angel López		(Puerto Rico) Puerto Rican	
13	Marland Rodríguez		(Cuba) Cuban	20
14	Natalie Amaya		(El Salvador) Salvadoran	
15	Priscila Salisbury		(Mexico) Mexican	19
16	Rodolfo Castera		(Puerto Rico) Puerto Rican	23
17	Rosangela Abreu Crespo		(Puerto Rico) Puerto Rican	21
18	Tairon Aguilera		(Venezuela) Venezuelan	24
19	Verónica Zavala		(Mexico) Mexican	
20	Wenceslao Navarro		(Mexico) Mexican	

* Age was taken at the beginning of the contest (2007)

== Controversies ==
Some controversies that surfaced during the season.

- During the show, contestant Carlos Rubén Salazar fell in love with one of the dancers of the shows. He was disqualified for going outside the studio/house at night without permission to meet her. They married shortly afterwards and, as of 2008 are still together.
- Shortly after winning, several pornographic pictures of Anaís surfaced on the Internet. She admitted to having posed to the pictures several years before the show in the Dominican Republic and apologized for them.

== After the Show ==
- Season winner Anaís has released two albums: Así Soy Yo (2006) and Con Todo Mi Corazón (2007). The former was nominated for a Latin Grammy. She also recorded "Arriba, Arriba", the theme song for the 2006 FIFA World Cup together with Pablo Montero, Mariana Seoane, and Ana Bárbara.
- First finalist Azucena Salazar and her brother, Carlos Rubén, have been performing with their father as Los Salazar, a mariachi group. They even performed at the White House during George W. Bush's presidency.
- Jayro Rosado released an album titled Melódico in 2006.
- Estéban Nuñez released an album, and has also been acting in local plays.
- Rodolfo Castera served as host of shows and events. Since 2006, he has been acting in soap operas.
- Rosangela Abreu Crespo Abreu recorded a song with Salsa singer Gilberto Santa Rosa. She also participated in the second season of Latin American Idol where she finished in third place.
- Tairon Aguilera has dedicated himself to songwriting, composing songs for some contestants of the show.
- Emilio Acevedo joined the group Zone D' Tambora, produced by merengue singer Elvis Crespo. After that, they changed their name to AreaNova.
- Wenceslao Navarro has continued to work with his former band and released an album with them.
- In early 2007, the husband of Carmen Rivera was killed when he apparently intervened in a bar fight in Puerto Rico.
- Darla Delgado appeared in subsequent seasons of the show as a dancer. She also participated in the fifth season of Nuestra Belleza Latina which was held in 2011.
- Priscilla Salisbury won Best Female Singer Award at the 2025 Catholic Music Awards in Rome.
