= Janina (given name) =

Female given name

Janina is a given name, a feminine analog of Jan and Jonas.

Notable people with the name include:

- Janina Andersson (born 1971), Finnish politician
- Janina Baechle (born 1969), German operatic mezzo-soprano
- Janina Bauman (1926–2009), Polish journalist and writer of Jewish origin
- Janina Borońska (1943–2026), Polish actress
- Janina Dłuska (1899–1932), Russian Empire-born Polish artist, illustrator
- Janina Dziarnowska (1903–1992), Ukrainian born Polish writer, translator and publicist
- Janina Elkin (born 1982), German actress
- Janina Fialkowska (born 1951), Canadian classical pianist
- Janina Fry (born 1973), Finnish pop singer and model
- Janina Garscia (1920–2004), Polish composer, pianist, and music teacher
- Janina Gavankar (born 1980), American actress and musician
- Janina Hettich (born 1996), German biathlete
- Janina Stronski (born 1946), Canadian-American TV talk show host better known as Jenny Jones (presenter)
- Janina Mazierska (born 1948), Polish electrical engineer
- Janina Minge (born 1999), German footballer
- Janina Natusiewicz-Mirer (1940–2010), Polish activist
- Janina Niedźwiecka (1922–2004), Polish film editor
- Janina Ochojska (born 1955), Polish humanitarian activist, Member of the European Parliament
- Janina Orlov (born 1955), Finnish-Swedish translator of literature
- Janina Oszast (1908–1986), Polish biologist and resistance movement member
- Janina Oyrzanowska-Poplewska (1918–2001), Polish academic and veterinarian
- Janina Pohl-Mizerska (1909–1999), Polish cryptographer and nurse
- Janina Paradowska (1942–2016), Polish journalist
- Janina Ramirez (born 1980), British art historian and TV presenter
- Janina Rizzo Alvear (born 1972), Ecuadorian politician
- Janina Szymkowiak (1910–1942), Polish nun, beatified by the Catholic Church
- Janina Zakrzewska (1928–1995), Polish lawyer
- Janina Żejmo (1909–1987), Soviet actress

== See also ==
- Janina (disambiguation)
