= Shawnee Taveras =

American singer-songwriter

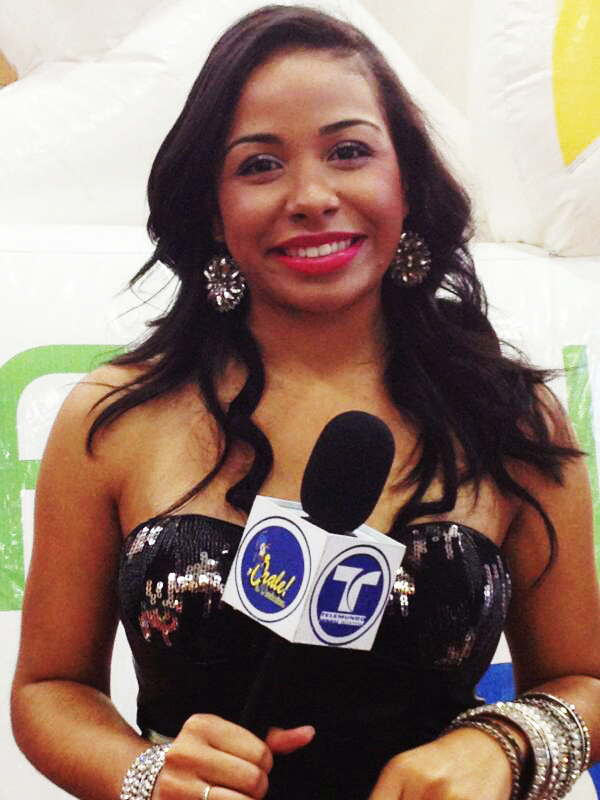
Shawnee Taveras

Shawnee Taveras is a Dominican-American singer-songwriter, specializing in the salsa genre and a media personality living in Providence, Rhode Island. Taveras is a member of the Telemundo Providence cast and has released several singles.

In 2019, Taveras was awarded the Premio Conga de la Salsa in the Dominican Republic for best new musical act. She has had top ten singles in the Dominican Republic and has toured extensively in that country as well as on the US East Coast. Taveras has appeared on television and radio shows in the Dominican Republic including El Show de Jochy Santos, Te Estoy Facturando, La Belleza es Mia con Mia Cepeda, El Zol de la Mañana, and El Mismo Golpe. In 2013, she received an award for artistic excellence from the Dominican Republic's Ministry of Youth.

Taveras was born in Santo Domingo in 1993 and her family moved to Rhode Island when she was young. She started her music career in Providence in 2007, by participating in El Festival de La Voz. Shortly after, she performed at festivals and concerts across the region. She has also performed throughout the Dominican Republic. Her musical influences include Milly Quezada, Shakira and Juan Luis Guerra.
