= Emmanuel Reyes =

Emmanuel Reyes may refer to:

- Emmanuel Reyes Carmona (born 1987), Mexican politician
- Emmanuel Reyes Evangelista (stage name EmmaKings; born 1997), Dominican singer and baseball pitcher
- Enmanuel Reyes (born 1992), Cuban-born Spanish amateur boxer
