= EmmaKings =

- Born: Emmanuel Reyes Evangelista; Santo Domingo, Dominican Republic
- Genres: Bachata (music), Latin pop, Tropical music, Reggaeton, Contemporary R&B
- Occupations: Singer, songwriter, former professional baseball player
- Instrument: Voice
- Years active: 2019–present

Emmanuel Reyes (born December 14, 1997, stage name EmmaKings), is a Dominican singer, songwriter and professional baseball pitcher. He was a pitcher in Major League Baseball (MLB) for the Toronto Blue Jays. In 2022 he participated in the television series The Voice Dominicana, and in 2019 he was a semi-finalist in the television series Dominicana's Got Talent.

== Early life ==
Reyes was born in Cancino Adentro, Santo Domingo, Dominican Republic, on December 14, 1997. He is the second of his siblings and the son of Dominican parents.

== Career ==
In 2016, Reyes began his career as a pitcher in Major League Baseball (MLB) for the Toronto Blue Jays. He immigrated to Florida, participated in 3 seasons. In 2019 he began his musical career and together with his sister became a semi-finalist in the television series Dominican's Got Talent.

He participated in contests through social networks and performed songs by Romeo Santos and Lenny Santos, ex-guitarist of Aventura. At the same time he received a call from one of Romeo Santos' current guitarists, Wilmore Franco (Bimbo), and invited him to participate in the studio album American Bachata, joining singers Eddy Herera, Alex Matos, Kiko Rodríguez, Vakero, Juddy Santos participate. In 2020 Reyes released the song ''Baby Yo Te Quiero a Ti'', a Spanish version in the bachata genre, a remake of the original song ''Baby I Love You''. In 2022 he participated in the second season of The Voice Dominicana. He participated in the 2021 Soberano Awards Casting.
