= Ektor Rivera =

Puerto Rican Broadway actor and singer (born 1980)

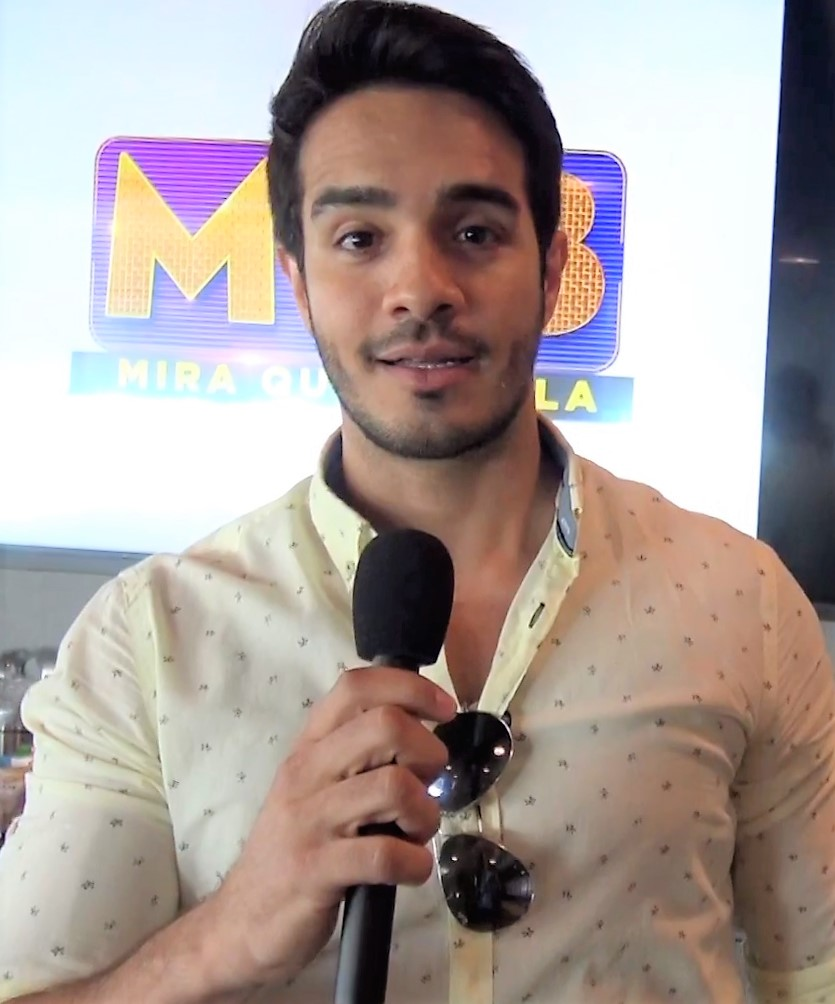
- Rivera in 2017

Background information
- Born: Héctor Ramón Rivera Alicea; February 11, 1980 (age 46)
- Origin: Bayamón, Puerto Rico
- Occupations: Actor; singer; visual artist
- Instrument: Vocals
- Years active: 1996–present
- Website: ektorrivera.com

Héctor "Ektor" Ramón Rivera Alicea (born February 11, 1980) is a Puerto Rican actor, singer, and visual artist.

== Early years and education ==
Héctor Rivera Alicea was born on February 11, 1980, in Bayamón, Puerto Rico. His parents are Iris Alicea and Héctor Rivera Sr. He completed a Bachelor's degree in Image and Digital Design from the Escuela de Artes Plásticas y Diseño de Puerto Rico, graduating magna cum laude. As for the acting, he has taken courses and independent workshops in Los Angeles and Puerto Rico. His acting mentors and acting schools are: Idalia Perez Garay, Vicente Juarbe, Yamaris Latorre, Alex Taylor, Courtney Burr iii, Margie Haber and Ivana Chubbuck, among others. On the other hand, as a singer, two of his main mentors are: Francisco "Vale" Rodríguez & Hilda Ramos.

== Musical theatre ==
Broadway

Ektor began his Broadway career in the leading role of Emilio Estefan for the musical On Your Feet!, featured at the Marquis Theatre, New York. The musical is based on the life and music of Gloria Estefan and her husband Emilio Estefan. During this period, he performed in various concerts and special events like the Tony Awards Billboard's Series, CBS Macy's Thanksgiving Day Parade and the renowned New Year Eve's celebration, Dick Clark's New Year's Rockin' Eve, held at New York City's Times Square for ABC.

Years before, he joined the cast of Broadway and Beyond, responsible for the opening of the Walt Disney Theater at the Dr. Phillips Center for the Performing Arts in Orlando, Florida. The show was directed by Richard Jay-Alexander and included the participation of Sierra Boggess, Norm Lewis, Chris Mann, Deborah Voigt and Jane Monheit among others. All accompanied by the Orlando Philharmonic Orchestra.

Ektor was recognized as one of the Ambassadors of the Puerto Rican Day Parade in New York.

London

In 2019, he performed in the leading role of Juan Perón for the musical Evita featured at the Regent's Park Open Air Theatre in London, UK. Evita is a musical with music by Andrew Lloyd Webber and lyrics and book by Tim Rice. It concentrates on the life of Argentine political leader Eva Perón, the second wife of Argentine President Juan Perón. The story follows Evita's early life, rise to power, charity work, and eventual death. The musical was directed by Jamie Lloyd. In 2020, this version of the musical was nominated for two Laurence Olivier Award for best Musical Revival and Best Choreography by Fabian Aloise.

Las Vegas

Ektor is known for being one of the lead singers in the USA TV & Live Show Q'Viva! The Chosen, produced by Jennifer López, Marc Anthony and "The billion-dollar tour director" (Variety) choreographer Jamie King. The show, created by Simon Fuller, was the first show of its kind to be broadcast on both Univision and FOX simultaneously to a viewership of over 30 million people nationwide, and was presented live at the Mandalay Bay Resort in Las Vegas before an audience of over 10,000 people. During the show, López praised Ektor's voice saying "Having so much talent, it makes me wonder why someone hasn't seen it before".

Puerto Rico

Ektor Rivera was part of the Tony winner musical In The Heights, created by Lin-Manuel Miranda and presented to a full house at the Coliseo de Puerto Rico. The musical made history as the first musical theater show presented on the arena. Rivera played the lead role of Usnavi, which was played by Lin-Manuel Miranda himself on Broadway in 2008.

His first role in theater was in the musical Fama (as Tyrone Jackson) produced by Sonia Valentín and Alba Nydia Díaz. After that, he has appeared as leading actor in adaptations of plays like Barrio arriba, barrio abajo, Rent (as Benjamin Coffin III), High School Musical (as Troy Bolton), Hairspray (as Seaweed Stubbs), Godspell (as Jesus), "and The Outsiders (as Dallas Winston) among others. In 2008, critic Ileana Cidoncha praised Ektor's "scenic presence" in the play Hairspray, where he interpreted the role of Seaweed Stubbs.

- "In the Heights" (2021)
- "El milagro de la Tortilla" (2015)
- "Tu amigo es raro" (2015)
- "The Mousetrap" (2013)
- Godspell (2012)
- Piaf (2011)
- The Outsiders (2011)
- Barrio Arriba, Barrio Abajo (2009)
- Rent (2009)
- Hairspray (2008–2009)
- High School Musical (2009)
- Godspell (2007–2009)
- Objetivo Patria (2007)
- FAME (2006)

== TV and film ==
In 2022, Ektor Rivera and Lacey Chabert starred in the film 'Groundswell' for the Hallmark Channel. This story, filmed in Hawaii, is based on the book by Katie Lee Biegel and directed by Lee Friedlander. Another film starring Rivera for the Hallmark Channel was 'Sugar Plum Twist' alongside Jamie Gray Hyder and Laura Rosguer.

In 2021, he starred in the Puerto Rican film 'La Ultima Gira', directed by Douglas-Pedro Sánchez. Ektor Rivera portrayed the complicated life of Daniel Santos, one of the most important singers in Latin America during the era of Bolero. Rivera not only played the character but also used his own voice to produce 8 songs on the soundtrack. The album was produced by Puerto Rican salsa band 'Orquesta El Macabeo' and it was considered the best music album of 2021 by Fundación Nacional para la Cultura Popular.

Among his TV shows performances are: "Fantasy Island' (FOX), "NCIS" (CBS), "Start Up" (Netflix), "Lucia, Ignacio y otras historias", "Nene lindo", "Tercera", "Pasión de mil amores", "Incógnita" (TV Series), and "Ill Viaggio".

In 2017 he participated as one of the stars to dance in the popular tv program Mira Quien Baila for Univision, becoming one of the finalists, representing Puerto Rico and the foundation Cabecitas Rapadas ('Little Shave Heads'), non-profit entity for cancer patients in Puerto Rico.

Ektor appeared in a recurring role in Crackle series StartUp (as Eddie). As a Voice Over actor, Rivera recently joined the cast "The Shallows" by Sony Pictures.

Since 2014, he has been part of a various promotional sketches in the Jimmy Kimmel Live Show for ABC in Hollywood, California.

- Groundswell (2022) | Ben | Hallmark Movies & Mysteries movie
- Sugar Plum Twist (2021) | Mateo | Hallmark movie
- La Ultima Gira (2021) | Daniel Santos | Film
- Jimmy Kimmel Live! (2013–2016) Sketch. (ABC, Hollywood)
- Q'Viva! The Chosen (2012) Singer/Performer (FOX / Univision)
- Yo Canto (2011) Host (Telemundo)
- Club del Amor (2008) Host
- Un día antes (2009)
- Objetivo Fama Primera temporada (2004)
- "The Shallows" (VoiceOver - Feature / 2016)
- "Start Up" (TV Series-Sony / 2016)
- "Incógnita" (TV Series / 2015)
- "Pasión de Mil Amores" (2014)
- Por Carambola (2011)
- Il Viaggio (2010)
- Zapatos Prestados (para la Fundación Ricky Martin (2010)
- Lucía, Ignacio y Otras Historias (2009)
- Tercera (2008)
- The Argentine (2008)
- Nene Lindo (2007)

Ektor has also been the face of marketing campaigns such as Kellogg's Zucaritas (Frosted Flakes), Fruit of the Loom, Intel, JCPenney, McDonald's, Sony, Coors Light, and Heineken, among others.

In 2026, Ektor Rivera joined the voice cast of Rockstar Games' Grand Theft Auto VI (GTA 6), one of the most anticipated video game releases in recent history, voicing multiple characters within its open world.

== Music ==
Rivera adopted the stage name of Joker as he started his musical ventures in 1996, when he participated in an underground rap album titled Reggae Mania with DJ Joel. After that, he was part of a tropical music group named Magia, a quartet directed by dominican singer and composer Raldy Vázquez. During that time, producer Edgardo Díaz (MENUDO, MDO) encouraged him to audition for the reality show Objetivo Fama.

Ektor auditioned for the first season of the reality/talent show Objetivo Fama, which was held in 2004. He ended up as the second finalist of the competition, before winner Janina Irizarry and finalist Sheila Romero.

Despite not winning, Ektor still managed to get a record deal. In August 2005, he released his first album titled Un Paso del Amor. The album spawned a hit single titled "Te Voy a Amar" that was used in a soap opera from Univision.

Luny Tunes, a famous duo of producers, expressed interest in working with Ektor during an interview in Puerto Rican TV show Anda Pa'l Cara. This prompted each party to initiate conversations for a collaboration, as well as rumors of a second album produced by the duo. However, the album never materialized. Still, Ektor collaborated with them in the song "I Think I'm in Love", which also features Tainy. The song was included in the album Los Benjamins: La Continuación.

== Host ==
Ektor Rivera was the MC for La Musa Awards in 2018 – The Latin Songwriters Hall of Fame in Miami.

Together with news anchor Marjorie Ramírez, Ektor hosted Aventura Científica (Scientific Adventure) for SITV (Channel 40), a TV program that received the Environmental Excellency Award from the Environmental Protection Agency. It also received an Emmy Award as the best environmental program in 2015.

In 2011, Ektor was co-host of the show Yo Canto, alongside Daniela Droz in Telemundo, Puerto Rico.

== Visual artist ==
For many years, Ektor Rivera worked as an independent graphic artist in various companies dedicated to entertainment; designing concepts in large format for buses, banners, logos, musical productions, graphics for tv, movies and theater. His first individual exhibit was Persuasions (2007), he explored the meaning of imperceptible emotions through figures.

Ektor holds a bachelor's degree in Arts, with honors (Magna Cum Laude), on Imaging and Digital Design from the School of Plastic Arts of Puerto Rico.

One of his paintings ("Don Quijote") made history at the "Miss World International 2010" competition held in Shanghai, China. The same was auctioned during the Charity Gala and it was designated as the piece of art with the highest collections.

In 2023, actor & playwright Lin-Manuel Miranda, along with Ender Vega and Luis A. Miranda Jr., commissioned Ektor Rivera to create a painting as part of a living tribute to Rita Moreno. The piece, measuring 8'x11' and created in acrylic, is now part of the private and permanent collection of the Centro de Bellas Artes de San Juan.

Solo exhibitions:

- 2023 RITA, Centro de Bellas Artes, San Juan, Puerto Rico
- 2019 Puerto Rico en Mi, Museo de las Américas, San Juan, Puerto Rico
- 2012 Conexión, Hotel La Concha, San Juan, Puerto Rico / Conexión, Galería Telemundo, San Juan, Puerto Rico
- 2008 Íconos, Latitudes, San Juan, Puerto Rico
- 2007 Persuasiones, Huma, San Juan, Puerto Rico

Group exhibitions:

- 2015 Tríptico Sicalíptico, Vick Center, San Juan, Puerto Rico
- 2012 Calendart 2013, Hotel Caribe Hilton, San Juan, Puerto Rico
- 2011 Calendart 2012, Hotel Caribe Hilton, San Juan, Puerto Rico
- 2009 The New Phase, Viota Gallery, Guaynabo, Puerto Rico
- 2008 Designers Fest, Centro de Convenciones, Puerto Rico / El Rincón, Exhibición Virtual para TISOC, Barcelona, España
- 2005 Colectivo EAP, Escuela de Artes Plásticas de Puerto Rico, San Juan

== Personal life ==
Ektor married Yara Lasanta in December 2013 in a ceremony in Barranquitas, Puerto Rico.
