= Anaís =

Dominican-American singer

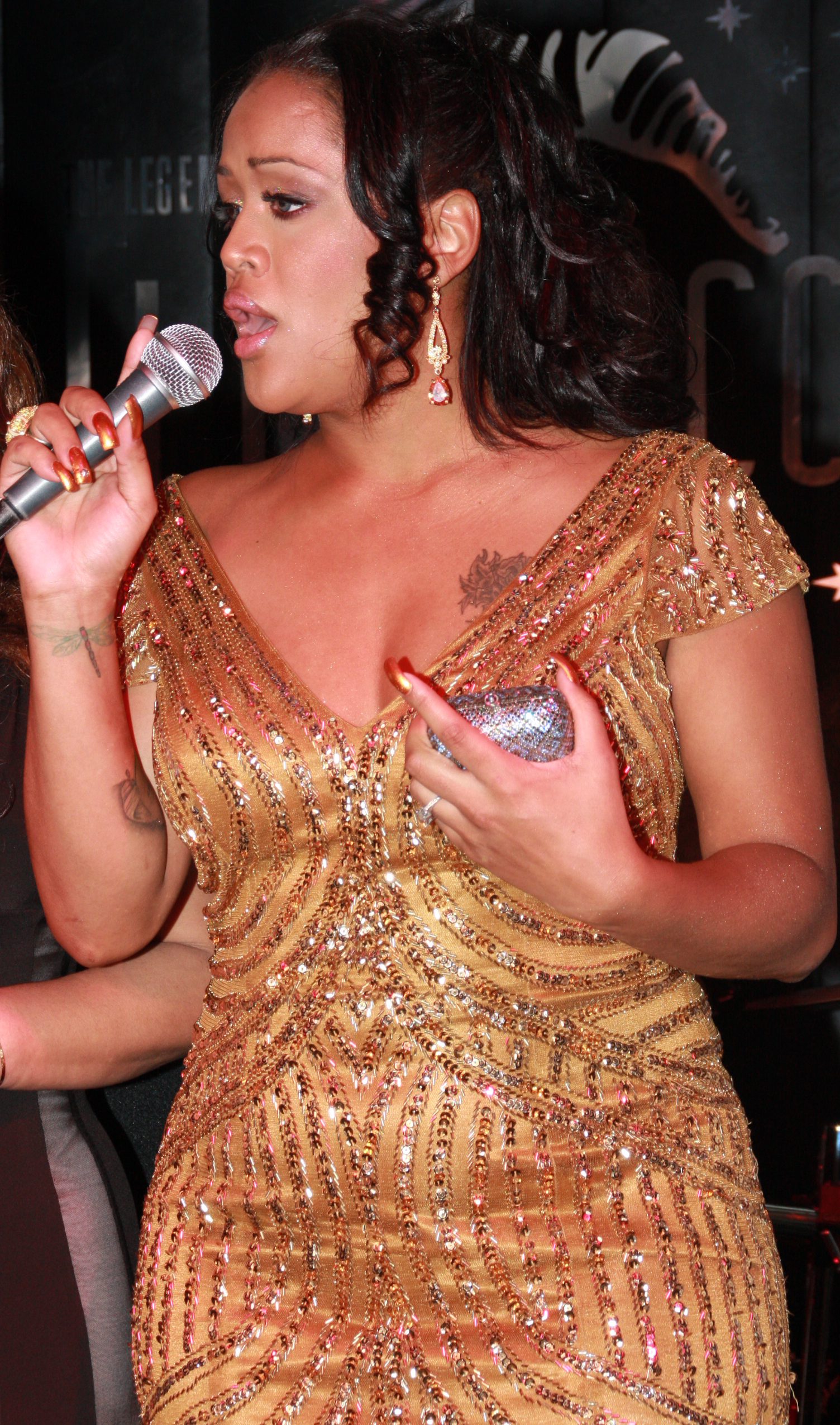
- Anaís in 2009

Background information
- Birth name: Anaís Martínez
- Born: June 22, 1984 (age 41); Santo Domingo, Dominican Republic
- Origin: The Bronx, New York City, New York, U.S.
- Genres: Latin pop, tropical, reggaeton
- Occupation: Singer
- Years active: 2005–present
- Labels: Univision Music

Anaís Martínez (born June 22, 1984), known professionally as Anaís, is a Dominican-American singer. She rose to fame after winning the Puerto Rican singing competition show Objetivo Fama in 2005.

== Early life ==
Anaís was born in Santo Domingo, Dominican Republic. She came to the United States at an early age and was raised in The Bronx, New York City since she was eight years old. Her passion of music began through her work with the Los Cumbiancheros school choir, performing regionally in a variety of styles, including Latin, reggaeton, salsa, tropical music and ballads in both Spanish and English.

In 2002, she appeared on an episode of The Jerry Springer Show titled "Bring On The Bisexuals".

== Career ==
=== Breakthrough, Asi Soy Yo (2005–06) ===
In 2005, Anaís won the second season of Objetivo Fama, a Puerto Rican reality competition show, which aired on Univision Puerto Rico in Puerto Rico and on the Telefutura network in the mainland. She released her debut album Así Soy Yo (translated as "This Is The Way I Am") on April 18, 2006, where it peaked as number 79 on the Billboard Hot 100. The album was preceded by the singles "Atrapada", "Lo Que Son Las Cosas", "Estoy Con Él Y Pienso En Ti", and "Estar Contigo". "Lo Que Son Las Cosas", which was originally made famous by Ednita Nazario, charted and peaked at number 79 on the Billboard Hot 100 and topped the Hot Latin Tracks chart for 6 weeks straight, earning her four Billboard Award nominations. "Estoy Con Él y Pienso En Tí" also charted in the top 10 of the Hot Latin Tracks chart and in the top 5 of the Latin Tropical charts. The album garnered several award nominations, including the 2006 Latin Grammys's "Best Pop Vocal Album" and Lo Nuestro's "Best New Artist". The album is the highest selling album from any "Objetivo Fama" contestant and Anaís is widely considered to be the most successful winner of the show.

On September 16, 2006, she began her Así Soy Yo Tour in Puerto Rico. During this time, Anaís released "Arriba, Arriba" for the 2006 FIFA World Cup, alongside Ana Bárbara, Pablo Montero and Mariana Seoane.

=== Con Todo Mi Corazón (2007–09) ===
On January 15, 2007, Anaís released "Tu Amor No Es Garantía", her first single from her second studio album Con Todo Mi Corazón, which was released on April 3 in the United States and on April 18 in Mexico. The album placed at number 20 on Billboard's Latin Pop charts. Its second single, "Sólo Mio", went Top 30 and peaked at No. 29 on the Latin Charts, making it Anaís's fourth Top 30 hit on the Latin Charts along with "Lo Que Son Las Cosas", "Estoy Con Él Y Pienso En Ti", and "Arriba, Arriba". During this time, Anaís performed the song "Como Tu Mujer" in a televised tribute to Mexican singer Marco Antonio Solís. Solís was so impressed by the performance that he invited Anaís as a special guest and opening act for his concert in Madison Square Garden. Anaís released the song on a special deluxe edition of the album on October 16, 2007. In 2007, she won a Casandra Award for "Most Outstanding Artist Located in Another Country".

In August 2008, Anaís posed for the cover of Smooth magazine. On May 17, 2009, she appeared on the series finale of Objetivo Fama, singing her hit "Estoy Con Él Y Pienso En Ti" and announcing that she was filming a film in the Dominican Republic and had started working on her third album. The album was planned to be completely in English and mark her debut as an international artist. In 2009, Anaís made her film debut as "NYC Thug's Wife" in the crime film La Soga.

=== Independent releases (2010–16) ===
Anaís parted ways with Univision, instead becoming an independent artist while attempting kickstart her music career in the United States. She released several independent pop singles during this period, including "Own It" on May 23, 2012, "Naked" on October 4, 2016, "Hostage" on March 24, 2017 and "Too Young" on August 11, 2017.

=== Television appearances (2017–present) ===
In 2017, Anaís joined the cast of Love & Hip Hop: New York in its eighth season. She returned in a supporting role in season nine, but disappears from the show after a few episodes. It is eventually revealed that she has been struggling with mental illness and been in and out of mental health facilities for the past few months.

== Personal life ==
Anaís is openly bisexual. She resides in Clifton, New Jersey with her mother and husband Confesor Ruben Brito, a businessman who works at a luxury car dealership, younger brother Damian Martínez a host of AmericanxLatino show and their two sons, Diamond and King Brito. She holds both Dominican and American citizenships.

== Discography ==
=== Albums ===
- Así soy yo (2006)
- Con Todo Mi Corazón (2007)

=== Singles ===
Year	Single	Billboard Charts		Album
Year	Single	Hot Latin Songs	Latin Pop Songs	Album
2006	"Lo Que Son Las Cosas"	1	2	Asi soy yo
2006	"Estoy Con El Y Pienso En Ti"	7	10	Asi soy yo
2006	"Estar Contigo"	—	32	Asi soy yo
2007	"Tu Amor No Es Garantía"	39	20	Con Todo Mi Corazón
2007	"Sólo Mio"	29	20	Con Todo Mi Corazón

Preceded by Janina Irizarry	Objetivo Fama; Winner; Season 2 (2005)	Succeeded by Marlon Fernández
