= Tu Amor No Es Garantía =

Single by Anaís

from the album Con Todo Mi Corazón
- Released: January 15, 2007
- Recorded: 2006
- Genre: Latin pop · latin ballad
- Length: 3:59
- Label: Univision
- Songwriter: Juanjo Novaira · Mario Pupparo
- Producer: Bob Benozzo

Anaís singles chronology
"Estar Contigo" (2006)	"Tu Amor No Es Garantía" (2007)	"Sólo Mío" (2007)

'"Tu Amor No Es Garantía"' (English: Your Love Is Not Guaranteed) is a song performed by Dominican-American singer-songwriter Anaís. The song was the lead single from her second studio album Con Todo Mi Corazón (2007).

The song was not a big hit for Anais, and failed to reach the success of her previous singles. It was however a moderate hit and gave her 4th top 40 hit on the Billboard Hot Latin Tracks chart, peaking just inside, at 39.

== Music video ==
The music video for the song was filmed in Old San Juan, Puerto Rico. The video starts with Anais in a dark room, backed by a live orchestra and is inter cut with various scenes of her and her assumed lover, first going on a date, then getting into an argument, and finally making up.
