= The Voice Dominicana =

Dominican TV series

- Genre: Reality competition
- Created by: John de Mol Jr.
- Directed by: Henry Jiménez
- Presented by: Jacqueline Bracamontes; Ana Beato (digital host, 2); Luz García; Jhoel López
- Judges: Yuri; David Bisbal; Natalia Jiménez; Eddy Herrera; Juan Magán; Nacho; Milly Quezada; Musicólogo The Libro; Alex Matos
- Composer: Martijn Schimmer
- Country of origin: Dominican Republic
- Original language: Spanish
- No. of seasons: 2
- No. of episodes: 38

Production
- Executive producers: Ariel Nina; Ramón Rodríguez; Darius Alfred
- Producer: Angelica Rodriguez
- Running time: 120 minutes
- Production companies: ProCapital Films; Ram Group Global; ITV Studios

Original release
- Network: Telesistema 11
- Release: July 4, 2021 – October 23, 2022

Related
- The Voice (franchise); La Voz España

The Voice Dominicana is a Dominican singing competition television series created by John de Mol Jr. and based on the concept The Voice of Holland. It is also a part of an international series. It is produced by ProCapital Films and Ram Group Global which was premiered via Telesistema 11 on July 4, 2021.

The series employs a panel of four coaches who will critique and guide the artists' performance throughout the season. The original coaching panel for the first season were Juan Magán, Milly Quezada, Nacho and Musicólogo The Libro. The show was renewed for a second season, where Eddy Herrera and Alex Matos were announced as new coaches, replacing Magán and Nacho.

== Format ==
The show's format features four stages of competition: blind auditions, battle rounds, knockouts, and live performance shows.

=== Blind auditions ===
Each judge has the length of the auditioner's performance (about one minute) to decide if he or she wants that singer on his or her team; if two or more judges want the same singer (as happens frequently), the singer has the final choice of coach. In the first season, the length of each coach's team is 14 members.

=== Battles ===
Each team of singers is mentored and developed by its coach. In the second stage, called the Battle Round, coaches will pair up two of their artists to battle against each other in a duet arrangement, after that the coach had to choose one of them to advance the next round, which is called Knockout Round. After making the decision from the coach, other coaches can steal the losing artists. Each coach can save one losing artist from another team.

=== Knockouts ===
In the third stage, called the Knockout Round, the 8 remaining artists of each team will be pair up with their coach and have a player-killing arrangement. Unlike the Battles, artists have to pick a song (or chosen by his/her coach) and have a solo performance, after which the coach need to choose one of them as a winner and advance to the Live Shows. There is no steal for this round, so the other coaches are not allowed to steal the losing artist to their teams

=== Live shows ===
The winners of the Knockouts will advance to this round. In the week one performance, the arrangement in this round is similar to the knockouts but there has the highest public votes receiver can advance to the next round (American version can bring 2 highest votes artists), and the coach can save one of the remaining artists. And the coming week is the live finale, the top two artists of each team will perform a solo song, and only two artists of all teams can advance to the "final showdown", which all the cumulative votes will be reset in this round. The highest public votes receiver in the "final showdown" will be The Voice winner.

== Auditions ==
On October 9, 2020, Online registration to join the competition was announced through social media accounts. Other auditions were held in some of the key cities in Dominican Republic as follows:

On-ground auditions of The Voice Dominicana
| Season | Date | Venue | City | Ref. |
|---|---|---|---|---|
| 1 | November 30 – December 2, 2020 | Hotel Dominican Fiesta | Santo Domingo | |
| 1 | December 7, 2020 | Grand Palladium | Punta Cana | |
| 1 | December 14, 2020 | Centro de Convenciones y Cultura Dominican UTESA | Santiago | |
| 1 | December 28, 2020 | Baní | | |

== Coaches and hosts ==
On October 7, 2020, it was announced that Luz García will be the presenter of the show. Jhoel López will be the second to be the series' presenter announced from the social media accounts.

Starting on October 8, 2020, coaches for the show were announced to be Juan Magán, Milly Quezada, and Nacho. Musicólogo The Libro was the final coach to be announced during the grand launch of the show.

On April 4, 2022, Eddy Herrera and Alex Matos were announced as new coaches for the second season replacing Juan Magán and Nacho.

On June 9, 2022, it was announced that Ana Beato will be the digital host of the show.

Coaches' timeline
| Coaches | Seasons | |
| Coaches | 1 | 2 |
|---|---|---|
| Juan Magán | | |
| Milly Quezada | | |
| Nacho | | |
| Musicologo The Libro | | |
| Alex Matos | | |
| Eddy Herrera | | |

Current coaches and hosts gallery

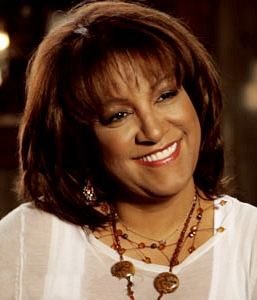
Milly Quezada (2021–)

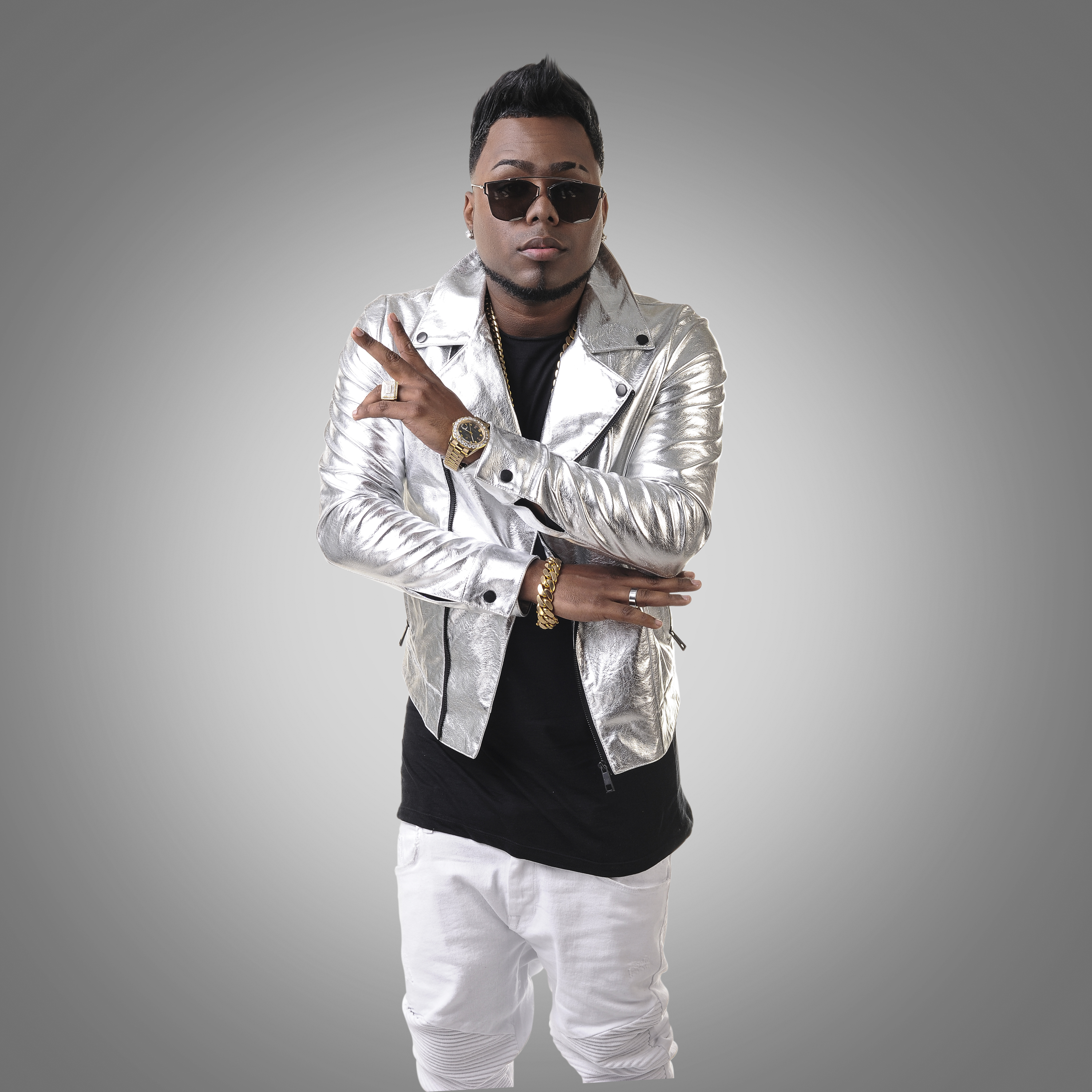
Musicologo The Libro (2021–)

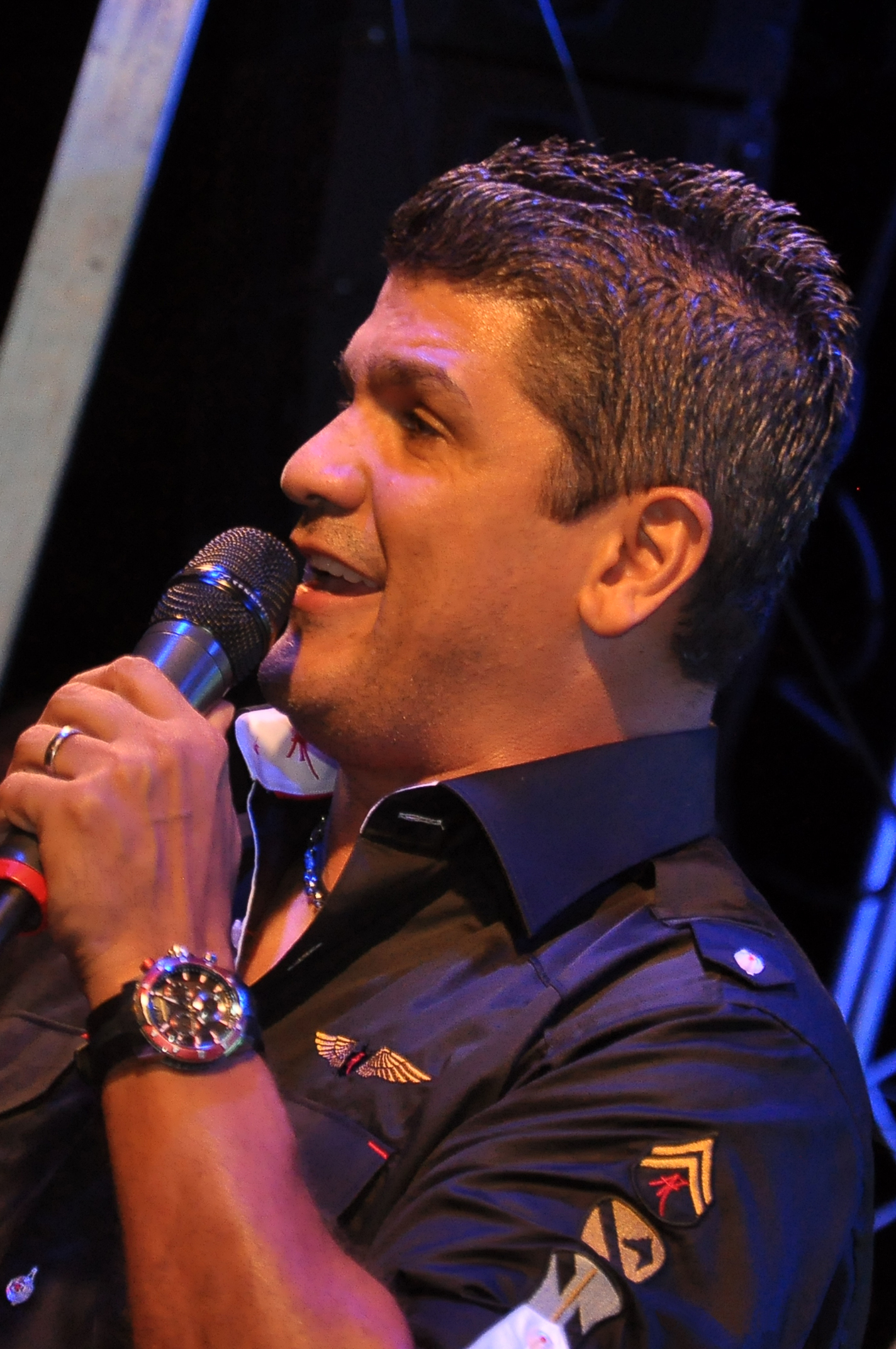
Eddy Herrera (2022–)

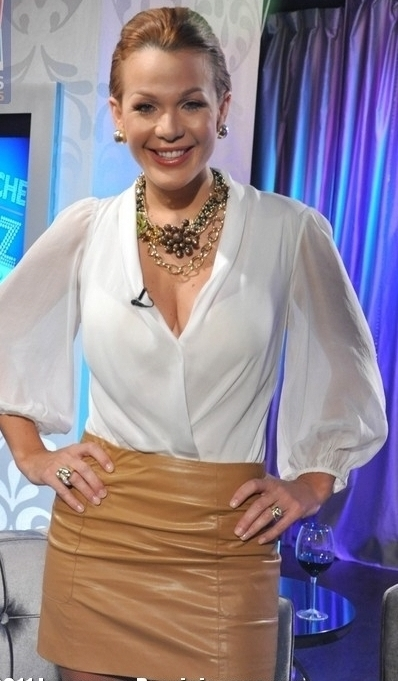
Luz García (Host, 2021–)
Former coaches gallery

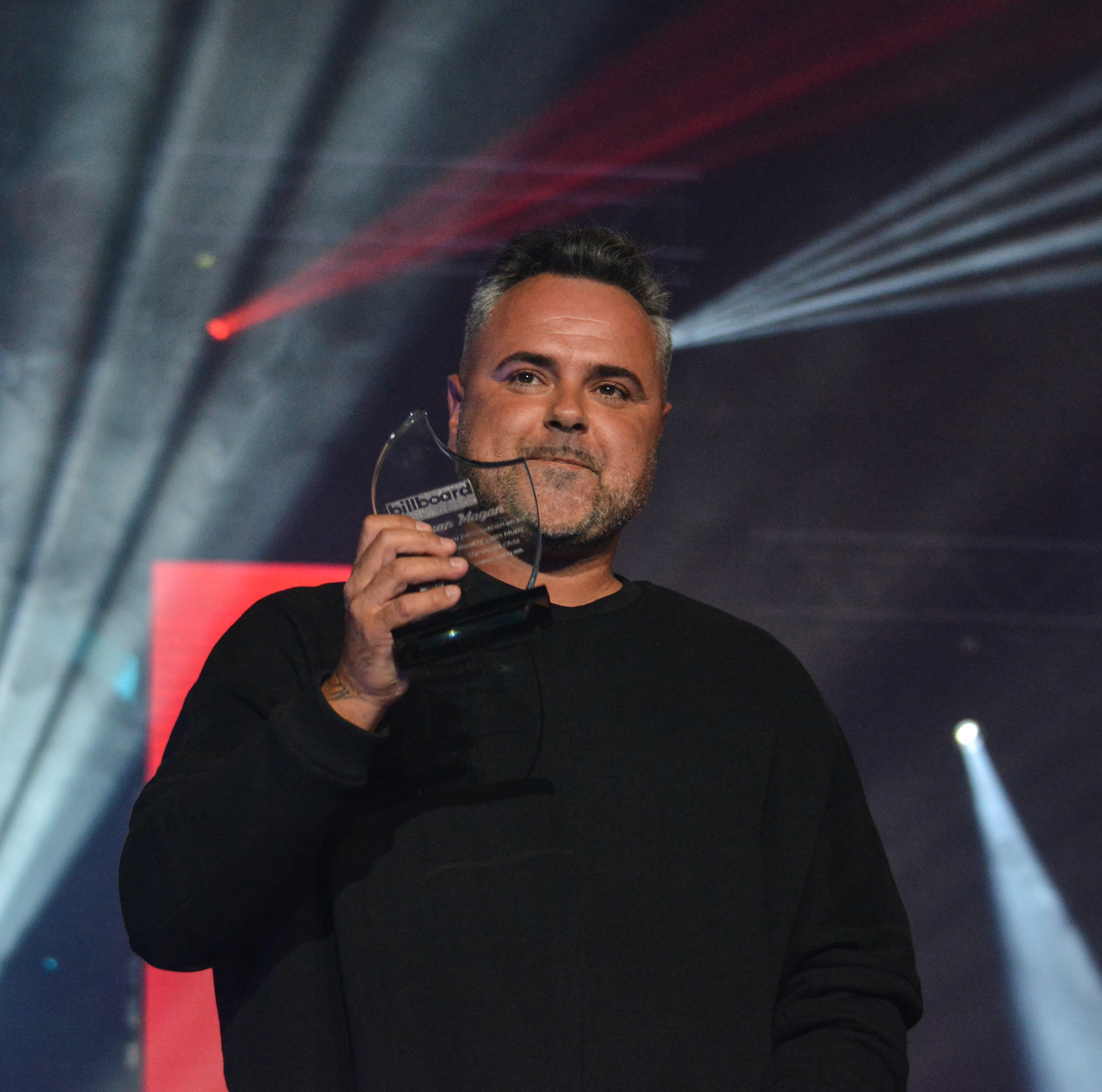
Juan Magán (2021)

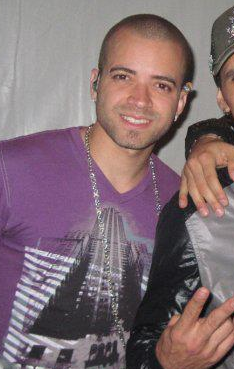
Nacho (2021)

== Coaches' advisors ==
| Season | Coaches and respective advisors | | | |
| 1 | Musicólogo The Libro | Nacho | Milly Quezada | Juan Magán |
|---|---|---|---|---|
| 1 | Mark B | Miriam Cruz | Johnny Ventura | Yiyo Sarante |
| 2 | Musicólogo The Libro | Eddy Herrera | Milly Quezada | Alex Matos |

== Series overview ==
The Voice Dominicana series overview
| Season | First aired | Last aired | Winner | Runner-up | Third place | Fourth place | Winning coach | Presenters | Backstage presenter | Coaches (chairs' order) | | | |
| Season | First aired | Last aired | Winner | Runner-up | Third place | Fourth place | Winning coach | Presenters | Backstage presenter | 1 | 2 | 3 | 4 |
|---|---|---|---|---|---|---|---|---|---|---|---|---|---|
| 1 | 4 July 2021 | 31 Oct 2021 | Yohann Amparo | Chrushman Saul | Ariel Assad | Alex Suarez | Milly Quezada | Luz García, Jhoel Lopez | —N/a | Musicólogo | Nacho | Milly | Juan |
| 2 | 12 June 2022 | 23 Oct 2022 | Adriana Green-Ortiz | Deborah Henristal | Dalenny Lopez | Yunior Cruz | Milly Quezada | Luz García, Jhoel Lopez | Ana Beato | Musicólogo | Eddy | Milly | Alex |
