= Janina Oyrzanowska-Poplewska =

Polish academic and veterinarian

- Born: Janina Róża Oyrzanowska; 2 May 1918; Warsaw, Regency Kingdom of Poland
- Died: 16 July 2001 (aged 83); Warsaw, Poland
- Other name: Janina Ojrzanowska-Poplewska
- Education: University of Warsaw (DVM, PhD)
- Occupation: Veterinarian
- Years active: 1947 – late 20th century
- Relatives: Robert Fryderyk Stichel (great-grandfather)
- Family: House of Ojrzanowski / Oyrzanowski
- Honours: Righteous Among the Nations, Golden Cross of Merit, Knight's Cross of the Order of Polonia Restituta, Order of the Commission of National Education

Janina Oyrzanowska-Poplewska (2 May 1918 – 16 July 2001) was a Polish academic and veterinarian. A professor at the Warsaw University of Life Sciences, she specialized in epizootiology but her main area of research concerned viral diseases of canines, which led to the development of the first vaccine for canine distemper in Poland.

During World War II, she was involved with Polish resistance, and her family helped a number of refugees. In 1981, she was honored as a Righteous Among the Nations by Yad Vashem for her efforts to save Jews during the Holocaust.

== Early life ==
Janina Róża Oyrzanowska was born on 2 May 1918 in Warsaw, during the German Regency Kingdom of Poland to Maria Elżbieta (née Czarnecka) and Kazimierz Oyrzanowski. Her father's family were Polish nobles, bore the Junosza coat of arms, and owned the Golebie estate near Pułtusk. She was the great granddaughter of Robert Fryderyk Stichel, the first person to earn a master's degree in Poland in veterinary science. Oyrzanowska completed her high school education in 1936 and began taking courses at the faculty of veterinary medicine at the University of Warsaw. Her studies were interrupted by the German invasion of Poland in September 1939.

Oyrzanowska married the veterinarian Mieczysław Poplewski (1916–1940), who would join the Polish Land Forces at the outset of World War II. Poplewski was a second lieutenant of the 7th Polish Cavalry Regiment and was executed by the NKVD in 1940 near Kharkiv when the Soviet forces invaded Poland and carried out the Katyn massacres.

During the war, Oyrzanowska lived with her mother, younger sister Maria, and older brother Kazimierz in an apartment in Warsaw. They also had other apartments in the city and a small summer hut on a piece of land they rented for truck farming in the Czerniaków neighborhood. Her family became involved with the Polish resistance from October 1939, and one of their family apartments hosted an underground printing press and document forgery studio. They helped Jews during the war, including their neighbors, the Linfeld and Sterling families; their gardener, Jerzy Glinicki; and others, including Wiktoria Szczawińska and Franciszka Tusk Scheinwechsler (during the war known as Natalia Obrębka). Maria, who had just completed her secondary education, and Oyrzanowska, who was attending university, grew flowers and vegetables to support the family. They moved the Jews they were helping, hiding them in their various homes, ensuring that each of them survived the war. Her family also offered hiding places to other refugees, including escaped Soviet prisoners of war. For their efforts, her sister Maria was arrested by the Germans in 1942 and from March to September that year was incarcerated in the Pawiak Prison. Eventually, the family escaped Warsaw in the latter stages of the Warsaw Uprising.

== Career ==
Following the end of the war, Oyrzanowska studied at the Maria Curie-Skłodowska University in Lublin before returning to the reopened Warsaw University, where she received her degree as a doctor of veterinary studies in 1950. She was working in a professional capacity from 1947. In 1960 she received a PhD degree, and in 1967, she did her habilitation. In 1978 she received the title of associate professor (profesor nadzwyczajny) at the Warsaw University of Life Sciences.

At the beginning of her career, Oyrzanowska focused on viral diseases of dogs and foxes, such as canine distemper and Rubarth's disease, which had been discussed in her PhD thesis Rozpoznanie serologiczne nosówki i epizootycznego zapalenia wątroby u psów i lisów (Serological Diagnosis of Distemper and Epizootic Hepatitis in Dogs and Foxes, 1960). Her work resulted in the development and production of the first Polish vaccine for canine distemper. She also conducted research to determine the necessary dosage for preventive vaccination against rabies. Other notable research by her concerned the topics of the pseudorabies, as well as of the bovine alphaherpesvirus 1.

Oyrzanowska was a co-author of a textbook Choroby mięsożernych zwierząt futerkowych (Diseases of carnivorous fur animals). She was a member of the Polish Microbiologist Society and Polish Society of the Veterinary Sciences and in the latter, she was a director of its Warsaw and epizootiology sections.

In 1980, Oyrzanowska, along with other academics joined in the founding of the Independent Self-Governing Trade Union of Science, Technology and Education Workers (Polish: Niezależny Samorządny Związek Zawodowy Pracowników Nauki, Techniki i Oświaty, NSZZ PNTiO). At their first meeting, they agreed to join their trade union with Solidarity in an effort to push forward the democratization process.

Throughout her career, Oyrzanowska received several awards, including the Golden Cross of Merit, Knight's Cross of the Order of Polonia Restituta, and the Order of the Commission of National Education. Based on the account of Franciszka Tusk Scheinwechsler, on 6 June 1981, Oyrzanowska and her sister, Maria, were recognized by Yad Vashem as Righteous Among the Nations.

== Death and legacy ==
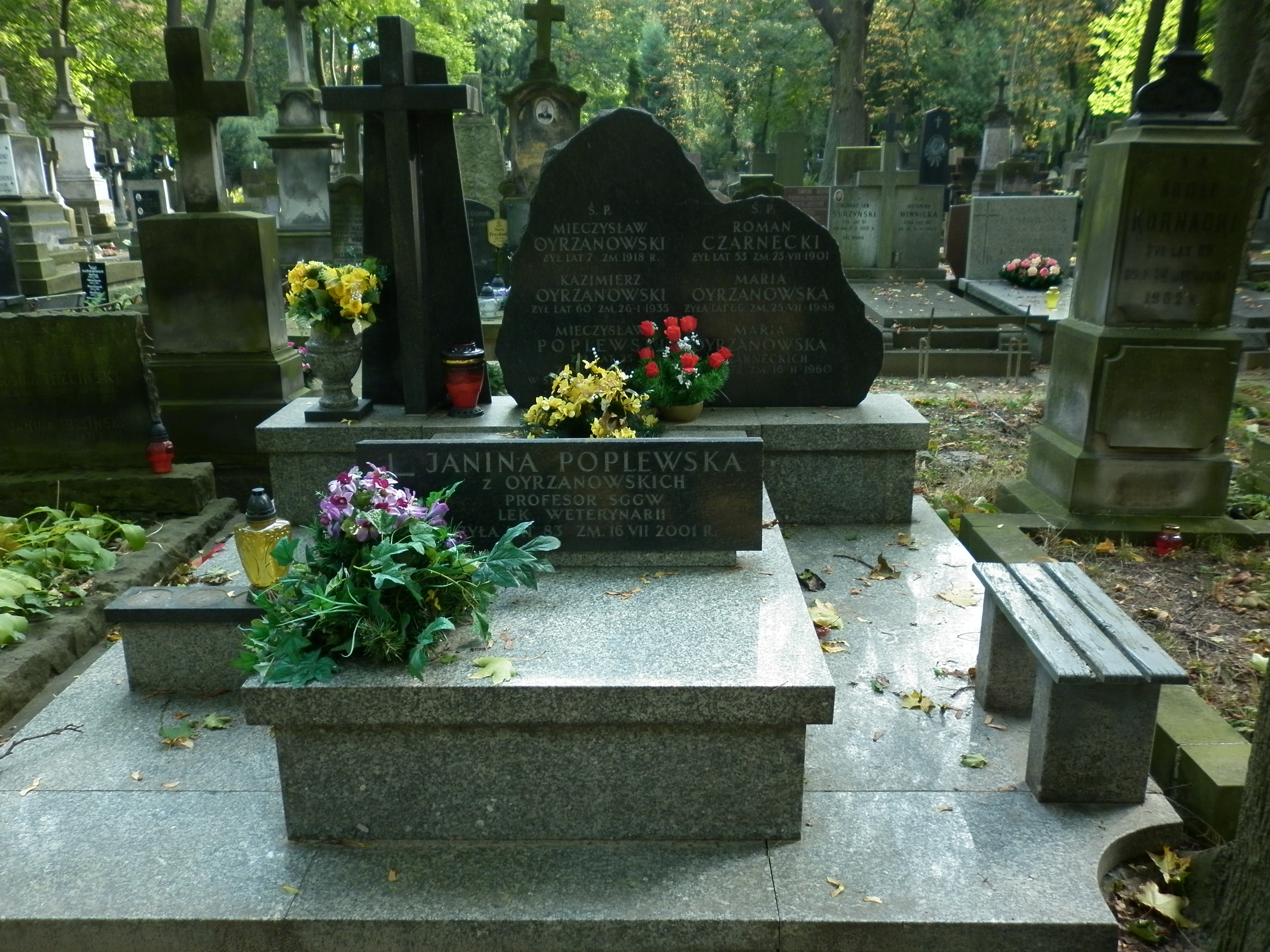
Oyrzanowska-Poplewska's tombstone

Oyrzanowska died on 16 July 2001 in Warsaw and was buried in the Powązki Cemetery.

== Selected works ==
- Oyrzanowska, Janina (1960). Rozpoznanie serologiczne nosówki i epizootycznego zapalenia wątroby u psów i lisów [Serological Diagnosis of Distemper and Epizootic Hepatitis in Dogs and Foxes] (PhD) (in Polish). Warsaw: Warsaw University of Life Sciences. OCLC 968507394.
- Oyrzanowska, Janina (June 1960). "Choroby zakażne i inwazyjne" [Infectious and Invasive Diseases] (PDF). Medycyna Weterynaryjna (in Polish). XVI (6). Warsaw: Państwowe Wydawnictwo Rolnicze i Leśne: 321–325. ISSN 0025-8628.
- Oyrzanowska, Janina (January 1961). "Ogniskowa martwica wątroby norek" [Focal Necrosis of the Liver in Minks] (PDF). Medycyna Weterynaryjna (in Polish). XVII (1). Warsaw: Państwowe Wydawnictwo Rolnicze i Leśne: 33–37. ISSN 0025-8628.
- Oyrzanowska, Janina; Kita, Jerzy (October 1966). "Przyczynek do badań nad drogą zakażenia wirusem choroby Aujeszky'ego u zwierząt futerkowych" [The Source of the Aujeszky's Disease Virus for Fur Animals] (PDF). Medycyna Weterynaryjna (in Polish). 22 (10). Warsaw: Państwowe Wydawnictwo Rolnicze i Leśne: 579–581. ISSN 0025-8628.
- Kita, Jerzy; Dziąba, Konrad; Oyrzanowska, Janina (1975). Ćwiczenia z epizootiologii: metody zwalczania chorób zaraźliwych zwierząt gospodarskich [Exercises in Epizootiology: Methods of Combating Contagious Diseases of Farm Animals] (in Polish). Warsaw: Państwowe Wydawnictwo Naukowe. OCLC 1150438398.
- Oyrzanowska, Janina (December 1976). "Wystȩpowanie przeciwciał neutralizuja̧cych dla wirusa choroby Aujeszky'ego w surowicach świnń z zarodowych ośrodków hodowlanych" [Occurrence of Neutralizing Antibodies to Aujeszky's Disease Virus in Pig Sera from Breeding Centers] (PDF). Medycyna Weterynaryjna (in Polish). 32 (12). Warsaw: Państwowe Wydawnictwo Rolnicze i Leśne: 717–718. ISSN 0025-8628.
- Kita, Jerzy; Oyrzanowska-Poplewska, Janina; Dziąba, Konrad (1987). Metody zwalczania chorób zaraźliwych zwierząt gospodarskich : ćwiczenia z epizootiologii [Methods for Combating Contagious Livestock Diseases: Epizootiology Exercises] (in Polish) (Wyd. 3 uzup ed.). Warsaw: Państwowe Wydawnictwo Naukowe. ISBN 978-83-01-06913-1.
