= Un Paso del Amor =

Studio album by Ektor
- Released: August 23, 2005
- Recorded: 2005
- Genre: Latin pop
- Label: Univision Music Group
- Producer: Alejandro Jaén

Ektor chronology
Un Paso del Amor (2005)	Ektor's second studio album (2009)

Un Paso del Amor is the debut album from Puerto Rican singer Ektor. Ektor was the second finalist of the first season of Puerto Rican talent show contest Objetivo Fama.

The album was released on August 23, 2005. The first single titled "Te Voy a Amar" was used in one of Univision's soap operas.

== Track listings ==
1. "Te Voy a Amar"
2. "Mientras Tanto"
3. "Templo de Metal"
4. "Yo Soy el Mismo"
5. "Un Paso del Amor"
6. "Ya No Queda Nada"
7. "Cuanto Duele Amar"
8. "No Digas Que No"
9. "Si Volviera a Nacer"
10. "Es Amor"
