= Lo Que Son Las Cosas (song) =

1991 song performed by Anaís

Single by Ednita Nazario

from the album Lo Que Son Las Cosas
- Released: 1991
- Genre: Latin
- Songwriter: Luis Angel Márquez

Ednita Nazario singles chronology
"Eres Libre" (1991)	"Lo Que Son Las Cosas" (1991)	"Mas Que Un Amigo" (1992)

"Lo Que Son Las Cosas" (What They Are Things) is a song by Ednita Nazario from the album of the same name. The song reached #2 on the Billboard Hot Latin Tracks in 1991. She was blocked by Los Bukis' "Mi Deseo" from reaching the #1 spot in May 1991.

== Anais version ==
"Lo Que Son Las Cosas"

Single by Anaís

from the album Así soy yo
- Released: February 13, 2006
- Recorded: 2005
- Genre: Latin pop · Latin ballad
- Length: 4:03
- Label: Univision
- Songwriter: Luis Ángel Márquez

Anaís singles chronology
"Atrapada" (2005)	"Lo Que Son Las Cosas" (2006)	"Estoy Con Él Y Pienso En Ti" (2006)

"Lo Que Son Las Cosas" is the second single released from the debut studio album of Latin singer Anaís, Así soy yo (2006). She first sang the song while competing in Objetivo Fama to rave reviews.

The song proved to be a smash hit for Anaís, topping the "U.S Latin Tropical Airplay chart", "The World Latin charts", and the Billboard Hot Latin Songs, where it stayed at the #1 position for an impressive 6 weeks.

The song won two awards at the 2006 Billboard awards for "Tropical Airplay Song of the Year" and "Latin Pop Airplay song of the year".

=== Charts ===
==== Weekly charts ====
Chart (2006)	Peak position
US Billboard Hot 100	79
US Hot Latin Songs (Billboard)	1
US Regional Mexican Airplay (Billboard)	8
US Tropical Airplay (Billboard)	1

==== Year-end charts ====
Chart (2006)	Position
US Hot Latin Songs (Billboard)	13

=== Music video ===
In the music video, Anaís seems to be the directors model and goes through numerous outfit changes while singing the song.

== Damienn Mendez version ==
"Lo Que Son Las Cosas"

Single by Damienn mendez
- Released: 2018
- Genre: Latin
- Length: 4:02
- Songwriter: Luis Angel Márquez

"Lo Que Son Las Cosas" is the first single from Damienn Mendez(2018).

=== Chart performance ===
Chart (2018)	Peak position
Mexico Top 20 General (Monitor Latino)	18

== Other covers ==
In 1993, Puerto Rican salsa musician, Tito Nieves recorded his own version of "Lo Que Son Las Cosas".
