= Todo de Mí =

Studio album by Janina
- Released: March 22, 2005
- Genre: Pop
- Label: Univision Music Group

Janina chronology
Todo de Mí (2005)	Contra La Corriente (2006)

Todo de Mí is the debut album of Puerto Rican singer, Janina, who became well-known after winning the first season of talent-reality show Objetivo Fama. The album was released on March 22, 2005 and produced by Univision Music Group.

The album produced two singles: "Porque Tu No Estas" and "No Me Arrepiento", that received heavy airplay in Puerto Rican radio stations.

== Track listing ==
1. "Porque Tu No Estas"
2. "Ya No Volveras"
3. "Y No Termina de Llover"
4. "Vete Ya"
5. "Me Pierdes"
6. "No Me Arrepiento"
7. "Mil Años"
8. "Libre"
9. "No Quiero Cambiar Mi Vida"
10. "Tu Entrega"
11. "Porque Tu No Estas" (Salsa version)
