= Así soy yo =

Así Soy Yo

Studio album by Anaís
- Released: April 18, 2006
- Recorded: 2006
- Genre: Latin pop
- Length: 62:31
- Label: Univision Records
- Producer: Sergio George, José Behar

Anaís chronology
Así Soy Yo (2006)	Con Todo Mi Corazón (2007)

Professional ratings
Review scores
Source	Rating
Allmusic	3/5 stars
Rolling Stone	3/5 stars

Así Soy Yo ("This Is The Way I Am") is the debut album from Latin music singer and winner of the second season of "Objetivo Fama" Anaís. It was released in the U.S. on April 18, 2006. "Lo Que Son Las Cosas" peaked at number 79 in the Billboard Hot 100 and number one in the Hot Latin Tracks chart. The album was nominated at the 2006 Latin Grammys for "Best Female Pop Vocal Album".

"Lo Que Son Las Cosas" won 2 awards at the 2006 Latin Music Billboard Awards for "Tropical Airplay Song of the Year, Female" (for the salsa version) and "Latin Pop Airplay Song of the Year, New Artist".

== Track listings ==
Main album

1. "Atrapada" – 3:24
2. "Estoy Con Él Y Pienso En Ti" – 3:49
3. "Lo Que Son Las Cosas" – 4:03
4. "Estar Contigo" – 3:23
5. "Sexo, Sexo" (feat. La Sista) – 3:59
6. "No Quiero Sufrir" – 4:27
7. "Suelta" – 3:31
8. "Como Olvidarte" – 3:55
9. "Que Te Pedí" – 3:32
10. "Así Es El Amor" – 3:23
11. "Atrapada (Remix)" (feat. Bimbo) – 4:13
12. "Lo Que Son Las Cosas" [Reggaeton version] (feat. Julio Voltio) – 3:49
13. "Lo Que Son Las Cosas" [Duranguense version] (feat. Alacranes Musical) – 2:59
14. "Lo Que Son Las Cosas" [Salsa version] – 3:41
15. "Lo Que Son Las Cosas" [Techno version] – 3:27
16. "Estoy Con Él y Pienso En Ti" [Reggaeton version] – 2:38
17. "Estoy Con Él y Pienso En Ti" [Salsa version] – 4:17

CD/DVD album

- CD

The same album track listing as the main album.

- DVD
1. "Atrapada" [Music Video]
2. "Lo Que Son Las Cosas" [Music Video]
3. "Lo Que Son Las Cosas" [Behind the scenes]
4. Recording "Atrapada", "Lo Que Son Las Cosas"
5. La Historia: Encenas de su participación en "Objetivo Fama" (The History: Participation in Objetivo Fama)
6. Photo Gallery

== Chart performance ==
=== Album ===
Chart (2006)	Peak
U.S. Latin Pop Albums	7
U.S. Top Latin Albums	11
U.S. Top Heatseekers	12
Puerto Rico Top 100 Albums	1

=== Singles ===
Chart	Peak
"Lo Que Son Las Cosas"
U.S. Hot Latin Tracks	1
U.S. Latin Tropical Airplay	1
U.S. Latin Pop Airplay	2
U.S. Latin Regional Mexican Airplay	11
U.S. Billboard Hot 100	79
"Estoy Con Él Y Pienso En Ti"
U.S. Latin Tropical Airplay	5
U.S. Hot Latin Tracks	7
U.S. Latin Pop Airplay	10
"Estar Contigo"
U.S. Latin Pop Airplay	32
U.S. Hot Latin Tracks	35
