= Jónína =

Jónína is a feminine given name of Icelandic origin.

== People with the given name ==
- Jónína Leósdóttir (born 1954), Icelandic novelist, playwright and former journalist
- Jónína Kristín Berg (born 1962), Icelandic art teacher, aromatherapist and religious leader
- Jónína Björk Óskarsdóttir (born 1953), Icelandic politician
- Jónína Rós Guðmundsdóttir (born 1958), Icelandic politician
- Jónína Jónatansdóttir (1869–1946), Icelandic politician
- Jónína Bjartmarz (born 1952), Icelandic politician

== See also ==
- Janina
