= Janina Zakrzewska =

Polish lawyer (1928–1995)

Janina Zakrzewska (12 December 1928 – 27 May 1995) was a Polish lawyer.

== Career ==
Zakrzewska was born on 12 December 1928 in Warsaw. She studied at the University of Warsaw, graduating in 1950.

Zakrzewska was a professor of University of Warsaw (since 1982), member of the Polish Academy of Sciences (since 1989), member of the Helsinki Committee, member of the International PEN, member of the Państwowa Komisja Wyborcza and judge of the Constitutional Tribunal of the Republic of Poland (1989–1995).

Zakrzewska was a participant of the Polish Round Table Talks.

Her notable works includes Spór o parlament (1961) and Kontrola konstytucyjności ustaw (1964).
