= Janina (album) =

Studio album by Janina
- Released: November 23, 2009
- Recorded: 2009
- Genre: Pop
- Length: 35:53
- Label: Universal Music Latin Entertainment

Janina chronology
Contra La Corriente (2006)	Janina (2009)

Singles from Janina
- 1. "Ya No Mas" Released: January 27, 2009; 2. "Fantasma" Released: September 15, 2009

Janina is the third album of Puerto Rican singer, Janina, who became known after winning the first season of talent-reality show Objetivo Fama. The self-titled album was released on November 23, 2009.

== Track listing ==
1. "Mi Enfermedad" - 3:18
2. "Fantasma (Alone)" - 3:55
3. "Jack Veneno" - 2:59
4. "Ya No Mas" - 4:01
5. "Otro Momento Casual" - 3:30
6. "Tengo Suerte (Unbroken)" - 3:35
7. "Amarte Es Morir" - 3:43
8. "Me Toca A Mi (Te Toca A Ti)" - 3:14
9. "Circulo Vicioso" - 3:54
10. "Todo Lo Hago Por Ti" - 3:45

=== Singles ===
- "Ya No Mas" - (January 27, 2009 | Main version) - (May 19, 2009 | Remixes)
- "Fantasma" - (September 15, 2009)
