= Janina Irizarry =

Puerto Rican singer

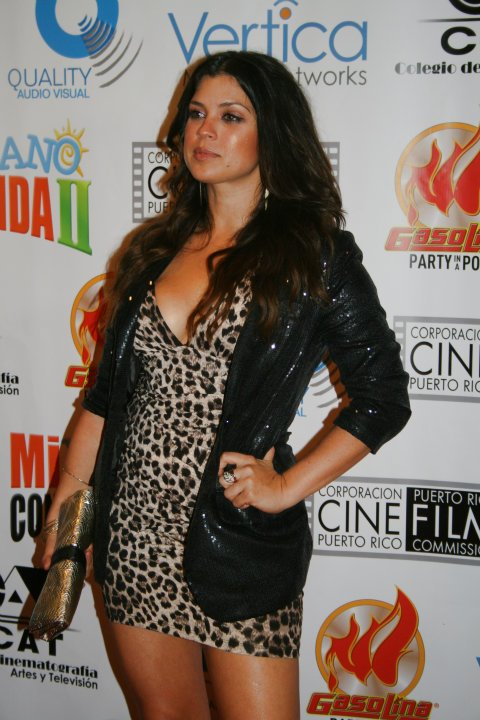

Background information
- Born: Janina Maria Irizarry Nazario; San Germán, Puerto Rico
- Genres: Pop; Latin; Latin pop
- Occupations: Singer; actress
- Instrument: Vocals
- Years active: 2003–present
- Labels: Universal Latino – (2008–2011); Univision Music – (2004–2008)

Janina Maria Irizarry Nazario (or simply Janina) is a Puerto Rican singer and actress, and winner of the first season of Objetivo Fama, a Puerto Rican singing talent contest. Janina has also hosted several television shows on the island.

== Biography ==
Janina Irizarry Nazario was born in San Germán, P.R., and moved with her family to Lajas. She received singing and piano lessons and piano.

From her early teens, Janina was a frequent participant in talent contests. In 2000 she represented Puerto Rico at a convention and competition for amateur artists called "Connections", in Florida, and won. She attended the University of San Germán, Puerto Rico, where she continued her musical studies, and was in a rock group, No Mistake.

=== Music career ===
Janina was the winner of the first season of Objetivo Fama, which earned her a contract with Univision Music Group. Her first album, Todo De Mí, was released in March 2005, which spawned two singles: "Porque Tu No Estas" and "No Me Arrepiento". Her second album, "Contra La Corriente", was released in September 2006.

Her Janina was released in 2009.

== Discography ==
=== Studio albums ===
- 2005: Todo De Mí
- 2006: Contra La Corriente
- 2009: Janina

== Filmography ==
- 2011: Mi Verano Con Amanda 2
- 2015: La Gunguna

| Preceded by None | Objetivo Fama winner Season 1 (2004) | Succeeded by Anaís |
