= Eddy Herrera =

Dominican singer (born 1964)

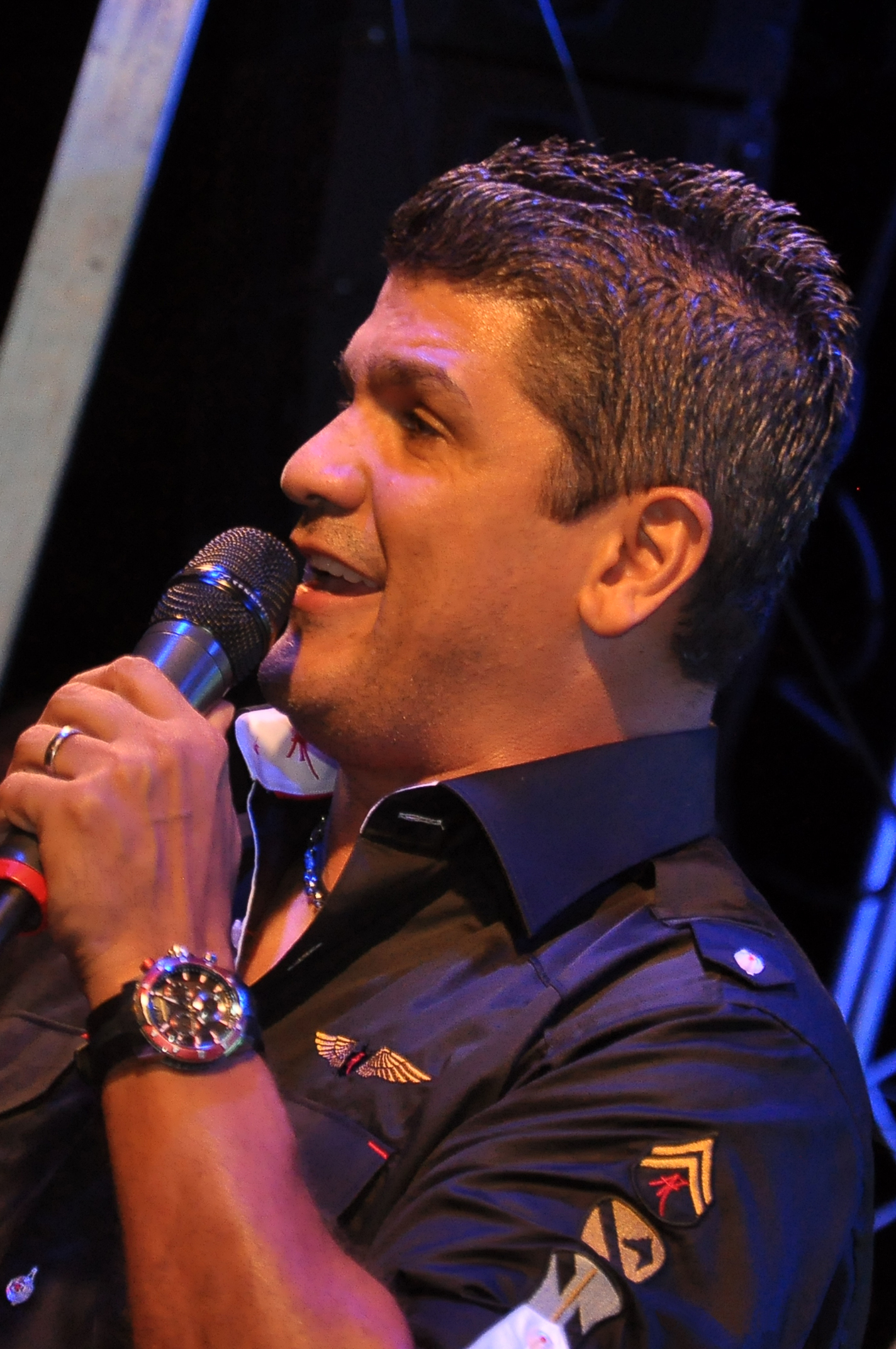

Background information
- Born: Eduardo José Herrera de los Ríos; 30 April 1964 (age 62); Santiago de los Caballeros, Dominican Republic
- Genre: Merengue
- Occupation: Singer
- Instrument: Vocals
- Years active: 1984–present
- Label: Intermusic
- Website: eddyherrera.com

Eduardo José Herrera de los Ríos (born 30 April 1964 in Santiago de los Caballeros), also known as Eddy Herrera, is a Dominican merengue singer and winner of more than seven Casandra Awards.

== History ==
He got his start in music at the age of nine, when he began to play the guitar and take classes from a music teacher. Herrera developed his talent and began to participate in various music contests, among them the Festival of the Voice of Santiago, where he won second place at the age of 15. At 17 he took first prize.

He entered the Pontifical, Catholic University Madre y Maestra to study architecture, but only lasted two and a half years, as he was presented with the opportunity to work in the group of Wilfrido Vargas and gladly accepted, disregarding his mother's objections.

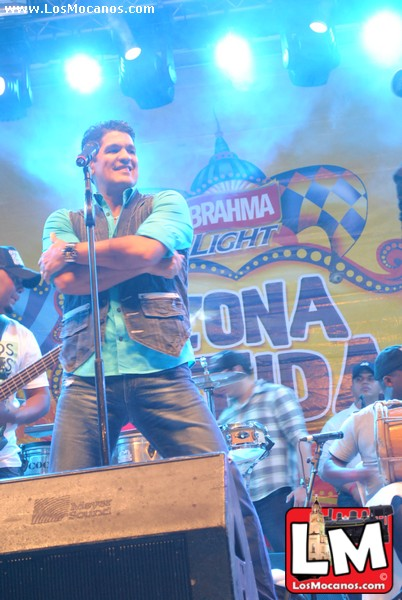
Eddy Herrera in music festival.

His first international success was titled El jardinero, which was launched three months after having joined the Wilfrido Vargas's musical group. He stayed in that group from 1984 to 1990, when he was launched as a soloist under the label MP Records. Their second album was recorded a year later under the same label; it was titled Mi more.

He later he changed record companies, joining MP J & N Records to launch the album Amame, from then on, all his records have come under the same label.

Countries like: Venezuela, Colombia, Curazao, Aruba, Perú, Ecuador, Panamá, Costa Rica, USA; Houston, New Orleans, Atlanta, New York, Boston, Los Ángeles, etc. have been part of Eddy Herrera's international in the time his tour of 2008. They project for Eddy to visit again some of these countries and also attract, new plazas like: Chile, Argentina and Bolivia in the end of 2008, and the first few months of 2009.

== Accolades ==
At the 21st Latin Grammy Awards, he won the Latin Grammy for Best Merengue/Bachata Album for "Ahora". Herrera has won the Casandra Award for Best Male Performer.

== Discography ==
- Independiente (1990)
- Mi More (1991)
- Ámame (1993)
- Lluvia de Amor (1994)
- Los Hombres Calientes (1997)
- Alma Gemela (1998)
- Me Enamoré (2000)
- Atrevido (2001)
- 20 Exitos (2002)
- Para Siempre (2003)
- Amor de Locos (2005)
- Paso Firme (2009)
- Vida (2009)
- Mega MixHits (2011)
- Viviendo Al Tiempo (2011)
