= Milly Quezada =

Dominican singer (born 1955)

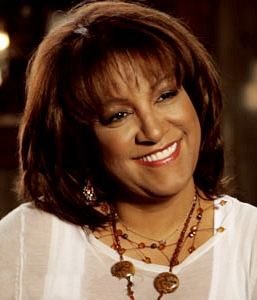

Background information
- Also known as: Reina del Merengue ("The Queen of Merengue")
- Born: Milagros del Rosario Quezada Borbón; May 21, 1955 (age 71); Santo Domingo, Dominican Republic
- Origin: Dominican Republic
- Genres: Merengue; bachata
- Occupations: Singer; songwriter
- Website: millyquezadaonline.com

Milagros del Rosario Quezada Borbón (born May 21, 1955) is a Dominican-American singer specializing in Merengue. She is a four-time Latin Grammy Award winner and has been referred to as the "Queen of Merengue" because of her impact on the world of merengue music.

== Early life ==
Milagros Quezada Borbón was born in Santo Domingo, the daughter of two Cibao natives and sister of four musician brothers. Growing up in such a musical family, Quezada became interested in music as a toddler—she would sing along with her brothers for family, friends, and small gatherings near her home.

Quezada and her family—her mother, Australia, and siblings, Rafael, Jocelyn, and Martín, moved to Washington Heights, Manhattan in order to escape the Dominican Civil War.

Quezada spent her pre-teen and teen years in Washington Heights, which was a central point in the Latin music boom of the era. In New York, Quezada developed an in-depth knowledge of her favorite musical genre, merengue, the fastest of the Latin American popular dance music styles, sung in Spanish and native to the Dominican Republic.

Quezada completed her primary and secondary school in New York City and graduated cum laude from City College of New York in 1981 with a degree in communications and mass media. She also graduated with a paralegal degree from Gibbs College in Montclair, New Jersey in 1992.

== Career ==
=== Milly, Jocelyn y los Vecinos ===
Her musical inclinations developed as a pastime in the streets of Washington Heights where she formed with her brothers and sister, the group that would become known as Milly, Jocelyn & Los Vecinos. Their music would identify the growing Hispanic Community of Dominicans in Washington Heights and their distinctly feminist style of Merengue captured the hearts and imagination of the growing Hispanic Community. Hits that would rise in popularity during the ‘70s 80s and 90s include "Volvio Juanita," “La Guacherna," “Tengo," and many other songs that would go on to become Christmas hits on national and international music platforms. Led by her oldest brother and musical arranger, Rafael Quezada, the "Queen of Merengue" along with the group would travel worldwide and become pioneers in the female-led musical Orchestra modality. They were first to bring live Dominican Merengue to major cities in Japan: Tokyo, Nagasaki and Osaka and regularly tour countries such as Madrid, Spain, Central and South America and many states with the United States where the Dominican Diaspora thrived. The group was also first in entertaining a Presidential Inaugural Gala in 1990: President George H. W. Bush in Washington, D.C.

=== Solo career ===
Quezada later decided to embark on a solo career, moving to Puerto Rico where she also married and became a mother, enjoying even more success as a solo artist. Since the 1990s, Quezada has been either on tour or in recording studios almost constantly, earning several prestigious awards and public recognition such as keys to cities (see below).

In January 1996, after the death of her husband and manager, Rafael Vázquez, Quezada took a break from her musical career which had reached twenty years and twenty long playing records at this tragic moment in her life and the lives of her family. In 1997 she was encouraged by her longtime friend and manager, Pedro Nuñez del Risco, to retake her musical recording career which marked a "before" and "after" in her musical accomplishments. Following Vázquez's death, Quezada went on to release and popularize songs like, "Lo Tengo Todo" “Entre tu Cuerpo y el Mío" “Porque me Amaste, "Para darte mi Vida" “Vive" “Toma mi Vida" amongst many other songs.

=== Later career ===
In more recent years, Quezada has released music that collaborated with various artists such as Fefita la Grande, Maridalia Hernández, Gilberto Santa Rosa, Pavel Núñez, Héctor Acosta, Ilegales, Antony Santos, and Olga Tañón. Many of these collaborations were on her 2019 album, "Milly & Company". In 2020, Quezada released "Gracias A Ti", a song thanking frontline workers for their work during the COVID-19 pandemic after the deadly impact of the COVID-19 pandemic on healthcare workers.

Since 2021, Quezada has served as a coach on The Voice Dominicana where her singer won in both seasons.

In 2022, Quezada published her thirty-fifth release, Resistirá, with Chris Hierro, the son of singer Henry Hierro. On July 29, she released a remix of the song "Se Busca" with Alexandra, La Ross Maria, and Techy Fatule. In 2023, she released a single, "Llegasté" with Manny Cruz.

In 2023, Quezada embarked on the "Viva La Reina" tour to honor her 45 years in the music industry. She performed at venues such as the Coca-Cola Music Hall in San Juan, Puerto Rico and Eduardo Brito National Theater in her native Santo Domingo. The San Juan show was produced by Miredys Santa Rosa, daughter of Gilberto Santa Rosa.

== Personal life ==
Quezada was married to Rafael Vázquez from 1976 until his death in 1996. He was also her manager. They had three children, Miguel, Anthony and Rafael Jesús.

Quezada was a close friend and protégé of singer, band leader and politician Johnny Ventura. After his death in 2021, Quezada frequently performed tributes to him in her concerts. She joined Ventura's son, Jandy, on a tribute album where she performed "La Agarradera".

== Awards and recognition ==
The "Queen of Merengue" went on to be nominated and received multiple national and international awards in the Tropical Music genre such as, four Latin Grammy Awards to date; Premios Cassandra Awards in the Dominican Republic including the highest honor in her genre "Premio Soberano" in 1997. Billboard awards and Univision's Premio Lo Nuestro in 1998, ACE Awards in New York, "Tu Musica" award as well as "Premios Globo in NYC and in Barranquilla, Colombia various "Congo de Oro" awards during several annual Carnaval de Barranquilla tours performed. Her well known Carnaval Song "La Guacherna" written by Esther Forero, is recognized along with Barranquilla's Carnival by the coveted "Worldwide Cultural Heritage" issued by UNESCO. Qwuezada been recognized by both the Senate of Puerto Rico and the Senate of the Dominican Republic as well as the Mayor of New York City for her cultural contribution to the music of the Americas.

OTHER AWARDS AND RECOGNITIONS

- Smithsonian Institution, Washington, D.C. ~ Inducted in the musical archives along with Dominican artists Luis Kalaff and Joseito Mateo in 1998.
- Decorated by President Hipolito Mejia with medal "Orden Cristobal Colon/Grado Oficial" 2001
- Boulevard of the Stars in Panama City, Panama ~ Awarded Bronze Star in this walk of fame Blvd.
- In 2007, New York City Mayor Michael Bloomberg recognized her musical contribution during Hispanic Heritage Month.
- Dominican Consul General Eduardo Selman presented in 2008 the medal "Orden al Merito Ciudadano" as the awards first recipient.
- Named by Decree "Ambassador of Cultural Affairs" by President Dr. Leonel Fernandez in 2008 and attached to the Dominican Chancellorship, a title which remains to this day.
- 2008 Master of Ceremony to the Cassandra Awards televised Ceremony where she receives the "Best Actress" award for her role in the movie, "Yuniol 2" – The movie also receives "Best Picture Award" for the same year.
- 2010 Dominican American Nat'l Roundtable, Washington, D.C. "Lifetime Achievement Award”
- 2011 Berklee College of Music, Boston, MA awards special recognition in their event at Miami Dade County Auditorium.
- 2011 Hostos Community College’s Presidential Medal of honor for musical contribution ~ this award was only presented to one other woman, Supreme Court Justice Sandra Sotomayor.
- 2011 Atlantic Chamber of Representatives of Barranquilla, Colombia's "Orden de Barlovento" medal for promoting Colombian Music worldwide.
- 2012 Two Latin Grammy Awards for current musical production "Aqui Estoy Yo" for Best Contemporary Tropical Album and for best Tropical Song, feat. Juan Luis Guerra "Toma Mi Vida".
- 2015 Barranquilla’s Mayor's Office declares Milly "Adoptive Daughter" with the golden Medal "Categoria Oro Grado Comendador".
- March 8, 2017 Providence, Rhode Island During "International Women's Day" is awarded 8 declarations of excellence during the "Extraordinary Woman Gala Ceremony of 2017" along with a special citation by the Office of the Senate of the state of Rhode Island.
- 2017 Governor's Atlantic Department of Colombia awards the medal, "Puerta de Oro de Colombia" by the Colombian Embassy in the Dominican Republic; and declares artist as musical Ambassador, during special event in Teatro La Fiesta, Hotel Jaragua, D.R. for worldwide promotion of Colombian songs written by Barranquilla's author, Esther Forero.
- 2019 ASCAP Latin Heritage Award
- In February 2021, the United States Congress, led by Representative Adriano Espaillat (a fellow Dominican), officially recognized Quezada and her contributions to music.
- 2021 Latin Grammy Lifetime Achievement Award

Keys to the City received by Quezada:

- Jersey City, New Jersey
- Providence, Rhode Island
- New York City, New York
- West New York, New Jersey

== Cinematography ==
In early 2009, Milly joined eleven other Dominican music legends on a national tour celebrating the merengue and bachata music traditions of the country. That tour was transformed into a Felix Limardo documentary entitled Sol Caribe. The movie features an original song, La Puerta del Nuevo Mundo that is a once-in-a-lifetime collaboration of the twelve stars. The film was the closing feature at the III Dominican Republic Global Film Festival in November 2009 and was attended by the President of the Dominican Republic.

In addition to the Cassandra Awarded movie, "Yuniol 2" Milly has played important roles in the movies: “Cal y Arena,” Puerto Rico; “Hermanos R.D.” in Dominican Republic and the movie “Juanita” written produced and directed by Leticia Tonos that was released in December 2018.

In 2022, a biopic about Quezada, titled MILLY Queen of Merengue, was announced starring Sandy Hernandez and directed by Leticia Tonos.

== Discography ==
In over four decades in the music industry, Quezada has released 31 records sponsored by a variety of record labels including Sony Music Entertainment Japan.

=== Milly y los Vecinos ===
- 1976 Esta es Milly con los Vecinos (This is Milly with los Vecinos)
- 1977 La gente de hoy (Today's People)
- 1978 Pa' Dominicana (To Dominican Republic)
- 1979 Milly en Boleros (Milly into Boleros)
- 1980 Los Vecinos en su momento (The Vecinos at Their Best Moment)
- 1981 Fiesta Con Los Vecinos (Party with Los Vecinos)
- 1982 Acabando (Kicking Some)
- 1983 Nostalgia (Nostalgia)
- 1983 Milly en Salsa (Milly into Salsa, alongside Luis "Perico" Ortiz)
- 1983 Avant Garde (Avant-garde)
- 1984 Esta Noche, Los Vecinos (Tonight, Los Vecinos!)
- 1985 Dinastía
- 1986 Special Delivery
- 1987 Etiqueta Negra (Black Tie Affair)
- 1988 Por Supuesto (Of Course)
- 1989 Ahora Es (Now's the Time)
- 1990 7+1= Vecinos
- 1991 Flying Solo
- 1993 Celebrando (Celebrating)
- 1995 Lo Mejor de Milly y los Vecinos (The Best of Milly y los Vecinos, a remix)
- 1995 En tus manos (In Your Hands)

=== As a solo singer ===
Quezada has recorded many solo albums, receiving a Latin Grammy Award for Pienso asi, MQ and Aquí Estoy Yo.

- 1997: Hasta siempre (Forever)
- 1998: Vive (Live)
- 2000: Tesoros de Mi Tierra (Treasures From My Land). Her first experience singing bachata.
- 2001: Milly, éxitos y más (Hits and More...)
- 2002: Pienso así... (This Is How I Think)
- 2005: MQ
- 2015: Solo Boleros La Milly una noche (Just Boleros Milly, one Night)
- 2016: Sólo Faltas Tú (You're The Only One Missing)
- 2016: Aquí Estoy Yo (Here I Am)
- 2019: Milly & Company
- 2022: Resistirá

== See also ==
- List of people from the Dominican Republic
