= Latin American Idol season 3 =

The auditions for season 3 started in March 2008, as in auditions for the previous seasons. There was a form to fill in the Latin American Idol official site to try for auditions for 2008.

Auditions dates and cities for season 3 were:

- March 29, 2008 – Buenos Aires, Argentina
- April 11, 2008 – Bogotá, Colombia
- April 19, 2008 – Caracas, Venezuela
- April 26, 2008 – Mexico City, Mexico
- May 3, 2008 – Panama City, Panama

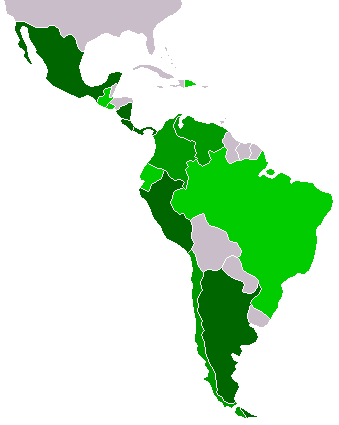
Top 12 (dark green), Top 30 (green) and Top 95 (light green)

Season 3 premiered on Thursday, June 19, 2008 at 9 pm in Sony Entertainment Television, with the auditions from Mexico. As American Idol and Canadian Idol, it also start using the new intro sequence. Episodes from Venezuela's and Argentina's auditions were broadcast on June 25 and June 26 respectively. Episodes from Colombia's and Panama's auditions were broadcast on July 2 and July 3 respectively. Theatre Stage episodes were aired on July 9 and July 10, with the Top 30 being announced at the end of July 10 episode. Semifinals Episodes started on July 16. Finals Episodes started on August 13.

== Top 12 Finalists ==
Margarita Henríquez – Winner – (10/09/2008)
1. "El Mundo Que Soñé" (Laura Pausini) – First Workshop
2. "Amigos, Simplemente Amigos" (Ana Gabriel) – First Concert
3. "Por Amarte" (Enrique Iglesias) – Second Concert
4. "Decisiones" (Rubén Blades) – Third Concert
5. "Cuídate" (La Oreja de Van Gogh) – Fourth Concert
6. "Yo Sobreviviré" (Gloria Gaynor) – Fifth Concert
7. "Cariño" (Jennifer Lopez) – Sixth Concert
8. "En Mi Corazon Viviras" (Phill Collins) – Sixth Concert
9. "Ojos De Cielo" (El sueño de Morfeo) – Seventh Concert
10. "El Universo Sobre Mí" (Amaral) – Seventh Concert
11. "Un buen perdedor" (Franco de Vita) – Eight Concert
12. "Que será" (José Feliciano) – Eight Concert
13. "Abre tu Corazón" (Written for the show) – Ninth Concert
14. "El Mundo Que Soñé" (Laura Pausini) – Ninth Concert
15. "Vuela" (Written for the show) – Ninth Concert

María José Castillo – Runner-up – (10/09/2008)
1. "Sin Ti" (Mariah Carey; Spanish version by Ricardo Montaner) – Third Workshop
2. "Dame Un Beso" (Yuri) – First Concert
3. "Mentiroso" (Enrique Iglesias) – Second Concert
4. "A Puro Dolor" (Son By Four) – Third Concert
5. "Cinco Minutos" (Gloria Trevi) – Fourth Concert
6. "Mamma Mia" (ABBA) – Fifth Concert
7. "Genio Atrapado" (Christina Aguilera) – Sixth Concert
8. "Yo Te Voy a Amar" (N Sync) – Sixth Concert
9. "Hijo De La Luna" (Mecano) – Seventh Concert
10. "Sobreviviré" (Mónica Naranjo) – Seventh Concert
11. "A quien le importa" (Thalía) – Eight Concert
12. "A mi manera" (Paul Anka; Spanish version by María Martha Serra Lima) – Eight Concert
13. "Vuela" (Written for the show) – Ninth Concert
14. "Sobreviviré" (Mónica Naranjo) – Ninth Concert
15. "Abre tu Corazón" (Written for the show) – Ninth Concert

Sandra Muente – Eliminated (10/02/2008)
1. "Si Ya Se Acabó" (Jennifer Lopez) – Second Workshop
2. "Yo No Te Pido La Luna" (Daniela Romo) – First Concert
3. "¿Dónde Están Corazón?" (Enrique Iglesias) – Second Concert
4. "Quiero Decirte Que Te Amo" (Laura Pausini) – Third Concert
5. "Cama De Rosas" (Bon Jovi) – Fourth Concert
6. "Si Tu Eres Mi Hombre" (La India) – Fifth Concert
7. "Matandome Suavemente" (Roberta Flack) – Sixth Concert
8. "Imprecindible" (Beyoncé) – Sixth Concert
9. "Desesperada" (Marta Sanchez) – Seventh Concert
10. "Todo Irá Bien" (Chenoa) – Seventh Concert
11. "Si no te hubieras ido" (Marco Antonio Solís) – Eight Concert
12. "Vivir sin aire" (Maná) – Eight Concert

Pako Madrid – Eliminated (10/02/2008)
1. "Canta Corazón" (Alejandro Fernández) – Third Workshop
2. "El Alma En Pie" (Chenoa & David Bisbal) – Wildcard Workshop
3. "Fiesta En América" (Chayanne) – First Concert
4. "Si Tú Te Vas" (Enrique Iglesias) – Second Concert
5. "Abriendo Puertas" (Gloria Estefan) – Third Concert
6. "Si Sé Que Te Tengo A Tí" (Nek) – Fourth Concert
7. "Bamboleiro" (Julio Iglesias) – Fifth Concert
8. "Ser Mejor" (Robbie Williams) – Sixth Concert
9. "Corazon Destrozado" (Bonnie Tyler) – Sixth Concert
10. "Aunque No Te Pueda Ver" (Alex Ubago) – Seventh Concert
11. "Ave María" (David Bisbal) – Seventh Concert
12. "Mi bando toca el rock" (Menudo) – Eight Concert
13. "América" (Nino Bravo) – Eight Concert

Manuel Arauz – Eliminated (09/18/2008)
1. "Si Tú Supieras" (Alejandro Fernández) – Second Workshop
2. "La Incondicional" (Luis Miguel) – First Concert
3. "Nunca Te Olvidaré" (Enrique Iglesias) – Second Concert
4. "Como Me Mira" (Fonseca) – Third Concert
5. "Perfidia" (Los Rabanes) – Fourth Concert
6. "Torre De Babel" (David Bisbal ft. Wisin & Yandel) – Fifth Concert
7. "Todo Lo Que Hago, Lo Hago Por Ti" (Bryan Adams) – Sixth Concert
8. "Solo Rock And Roll" (Los Piojos) – Sixth Concert

José Manuel Espinoza – Eliminated (09/11/2008)
1. "Vuelve" (Reik) – First Workshop
2. "Perdóname" (Camilo Sesto) – First Concert
3. "Alguien Soy Yo" (Enrique Iglesias) – Second Concert
4. "Que Alguien Me Diga" (Gilberto Santa Rosa) – Third Concert
5. "Si Estamos Juntos" (Sting) – Fourth Concert
6. "La Cosa Del Sol Naciente" (The Animals) – Fifth Concert

Nicole Pillman – Eliminated (09/04/2008)
1. "Escucha A Tu Corazón" (Laura Pausini) – Third Workshop
2. "Aquellas Pequeñas Cosas" – (Joan Manuel Serrat) – First Concert
3. "Héroe" – (Enrique Iglesias) – Second Concert
4. "No Llores" (Gloria Estefan) – Third Concert
5. "Como Tú" (Jaguares) – Fourth Concert

Manuel Salas – Eliminated (08/28/2008)
1. "Dime Si Él" (Ricardo Arjona) – Third Workshop
2. "¿Por Qué Es Tan Cruel El Amor?" (Ricardo Arjona) – First Concert
3. "Esperanza" (Enrique Iglesias) – Second Concert
4. "La Ventanita" (Sergio Vargas) – Third Concert

Raquel Bustamante – Eliminated (08/21/2008)
1. "Me Va A Extrañar" (Ricardo Montaner) – Second Workshop
2. "Tú" (Shakira) – Wildcard Workshop
3. "A Punto De Caramelo" (Melissa) – First Concert
4. "Ruleta Rusa" (Enrique Iglesias) – Second Concert

Francisca Silva- Eliminated (08/14/2008)
1. "La Paz De Tus Ojos" (La Oreja de Van Gogh) – Third Workshop
2. "Ahora Quién" (Marc Anthony) – Wildcard Workshop
3. "Atado A Un Sentimiento" (Miguel Mateos) – First Concert

Anne Lorain Lanier – Eliminated (08/14/2008)
1. "Amor A Medias" (Ha*Ash) – Second Workshop
2. "Rayando El Sol" (Maná) – First Concert

Jesús Pardo – Eliminated (08/14/2008)
1. "Qué Lástima" (Alejandro Fernández) – First Workshop
2. "Marta Tiene Un Marcapasos" (Hombres G) – First Concert

=== Weekly Themes ===
- Week 1 (August 13) – Songs from the 80s
- Week 2 (August 20) – Songs by Enrique Iglesias
- Week 3 (August 27) – Tropical Songs
- Week 4 (September 3) – Rock with Pop influences
- Week 5 (September 10) – Disco Songs
- Week 6 (September 17) – Spanish Versions of American Songs
- Week 7 (September 24) – Spanish Songs
- Week 8 (October 1) – Remakes
- Week 9 (October 8) – Songs Written for the Show

=== Performers on results shows ===
- Week 1 (August 14) – Alejandra Guzmán
- Week 2 (August 21) – Enrique Iglesias
- Week 3 (August 28) – Cabas
- Week 4 (September 4) – Aleks Syntek
- Week 5 (September 11) – Kudai
- Week 6 (September 18) – Fonseca
- Week 7 (September 25) – Axel
- Week 8 (October 2) – Luis Fonsi
- Week 9 (October 9) – David Bisbal, Belanova, Beto Cuevas, and Carlos Peña.

== Elimination chart ==
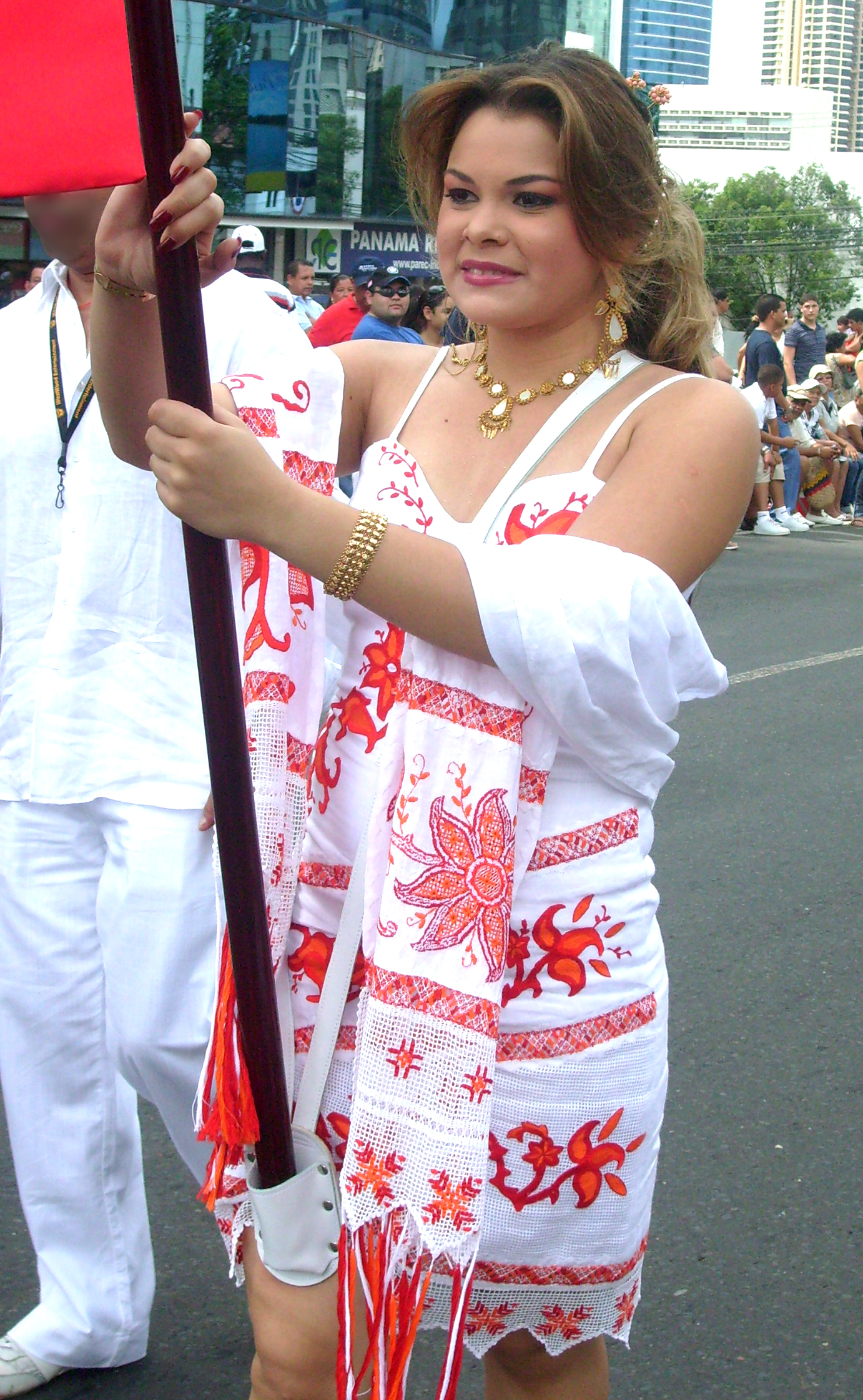
Margarita Henriquez, winner of the Latin American Idol 2008.

Semi-finalists are in alphabetical order by last name, and finalists by reverse chronological order of elimination.

Stage:		Semi-finals			Wild; Card	Finals								
Week:		7/16	7/23	7/30	8/6	8/13	8/20	8/27	9/4	9/11	9/18	9/25	10/2	10/9
Place	Contestant	Result												
1	Margarita Henriquez	Top 12												Winner
2	Maria José Castillo			Top 12										Runner-up
3–4	Sandra Muente		Top 12			Btm 6							Elim	
3–4	Pako Madrid			Elim	Top 12	Btm 6	Btm 4		Btm 3				Elim	
5	Manuel Arauz		Top 12								Elim			
6	José Manuel Espinoza	Top 12					Btm 4		Btm 3	Elim				
7	Nicole Pillman			Top 12					Elim					
8	Manuel Salas			Top 12		Btm 6	Btm 4	Elim						
9	Raquel Bustamante		Elim		Top 12		Elim							
10–12	Francisca Silva			Elim	Top 12	Elim								
10–12	Anne Lorain Lanier		Top 12			Elim								
10–12	Jesús Pardo	Top 12				Elim								
Wild; Card	Licetty Alfaro	Elim			Elim									
Wild; Card	Eliana Berreta		Elim		Elim									
Wild; Card	Karina Catalán		Elim		Elim									
Wild; Card	Ariana Dao Bolivar	Elim			Elim									
Wild; Card	Monserrath Franco	Elim			Elim									
Wild; Card	Yina Gallego			Elim	Elim									
Semi- Final 3	Rodrigo Arizpe			Elim										
Semi- Final 3	Daniela Cevallos			Elim										
Semi- Final 3	Vanessa Leiro			Elim										
Semi- Final 3	Carlos Quezada			Elim										
Semi- Final 2	Juan David Becerra		Elim											
Semi- Final 2	Osvaldo Conde		Elim											
Semi- Final 2	Andrea Ponce		Elim											
Semi- Final 2	Iván Torcates		Elim											
Semi- Final 1	Sinahí Méndez	Elim												
Semi- Final 1	Kelly Ojeda	Elim												
Semi- Final 1	Ricardo Rosas	Elim												
Semi- Final 1	Rodrigo Tapia	Elim												

- As of the first three concerts, the "Bottom" contestants were not directly mentioned. Instead, this chart shows the contestants who weren't called "Saved" at the moment of declaring the eliminated contestant(s) on each concert. The contestants that don't appear as "Bottom" on a specific date were announced as "Safe" before another contestant(s) was/were announced "Eliminated".
- On the seventh concert results show, the producers decided to send the four remaining finalists to their respective countries without making the ordinary elimination. Host Monchi Balestra announced that the votes of the seventh and eighth concerts would be merged, so the bottom two contestants would be eliminated on October 2 and the other two would pass to the final week.

== Workshops ==
=== First Workshop ===
1. Sinahi Mendez – "Volveré" (Jesse & Joy)
2. Ariana Dao Bolivar – "El Tiempo Que Duró Nuestro Amor" (Cristian Castro) (Wildcard)
3. Rodrigo Tapia – "Dejame Ser Yo" (Luis Fonsi)
4. Kelly Ojeda – "Un Día Sin Ti" (Roxette)
5. José Manuel Espinoza – "Vuelve" (Reik) (Finalist)
6. Margarita Henriquez – "El Mundo Que Soñé" (Laura Pausini) (Finalist)
7. Licetty Alfaro – "No Hay Forma De Pedir Perdón" (Pedro Aznar) (Wildcard)
8. Jesús Pardo – "Que Lástima" (Alejandro Fernández) (Finalist)
9. Monserrath Franco – "Perdición" (La Quinta Estación) (Wildcard)
10. Ricardo Rosas – "No Importa La Distancia" (Ricky Martin)

=== Second Workshop ===
1. Osvaldo Conde – "Que no me Pierda" (Diego Torres)
2. Eliana Berreta – "Lo Que Son Las Cosas" (Ednita Nazario) (Wildcard)
3. Iván Torcartés – "Antes" (Obie Bermúdez)
4. Anne Lorain Lanier – "Amor A Medias" (Ha-Ash) (Finalist)
5. Juan David Becerra – "Regresa A Mi" (Yuridia)
6. Andrea Ponce – "Me Entrego A Ti" (Ha-Ash)
7. Karina Catalán – "¿Quién Eres Tú?" (Yuri) (Wildcard)
8. Manuel Arauz – "Si Tu Supieras" (Alejandro Fernández) (Finalist)
9. Sandra Muente – "Si Ya Se Acabó" (Jennifer Lopez) (Finalist)
10. Raquel Bustamante – "Me Va A Extrañar" (Ricardo Montaner) (Wildcard)

=== Third Workshop ===
1. Vanesa Leiro – "Atrévete" (Chenoa)
2. María José Castillo – "Sin Ti" (Mariah Carey) (Finalist)
3. Rodrigo Arizpe – "Sueña" (Luis Miguel)
4. Francisca Silva – "La Paz De Tus Ojos" (La Oreja De Van Gogh) (Wildcard)
5. Nicole Pillman – "Escucha A Tu Corazón" (Laura Pausini) (Finalist)
6. Daniela Cevallos – "Él Me Mintió" (Amanda Miguel)
7. Manuel Salas – "Dime Si Él" (Ricardo Arjona) (Finalist)
8. Yina Gallego – "Te Busco" (Celia Cruz) (Wildcard)
9. Carlos Quezada – "El Amor Que Soñé" (Mariah Carey)
10. Pako Madrid – "Canta Corazón" (Alejandro Fernández) (Wildcard)

=== Wildcard Workshop ===
1. Raquel Bustamante – "Tú" (Shakira) (Finalist)
2. Monserrath Franco – "El Sol No Regresa" (La Quinta Estación)
3. Ariana Dao Bolivar – "Reloj" (Luis Miguel)
4. Francisca Silva – "Ahora Quien" (Marc Anthony) (Finalist)
5. Eliana Berreta – "Sola Otra Vez" (Celine Dion)
6. Licetty Alfaro – "Miénteme" (Bárbara Muñoz)
7. Karina Catalán – "Pienso En Ti" (Adrianna Foster)
8. Yina Gallego – "Malo" (Bebe)
9. Pako Madrid – "El Alma En Pie" (Chenoa & David Bisbal) (Finalist)

== Top 95 (Golden Tickets) ==
All the winners of Golden Tickets went to the Theatre Stage on Buenos Aires, Argentina. Episodes of this stage were broadcast on July 9 and July 10. On July 10 with the final cuts made, the group of semifinalists for this season was revealed.

=== Mexico ===
The contestants left out of the semi-finals from Mexico's auditions were:

- Grethel Jiménez Zavaleta, 19, Tuxtla Gutierrez, Mexico
- Yareli Lizette Ortega Herrera, 22, Mexico City, Mexico
- Ildelfonso Acuña Ruiz, 26, Hermosillo, Mexico
- Ari Benedicto Castro, 22, Puebla, Mexico
- Miriam Jackeline Solis Sierra, 25, Guadalajara, Mexico
- Paulina Cerda Manzo, 15, San Luis Potosí, Mexico
- Patricia Castillo Muñoz, 25, Aguascalientes, Mexico
- Víctor Manuel Gonzalez Velásquez, 26, Mexicali, Mexico
- Claudia Lizbeth Fuentes Nevarez, 25, Chihuahua, Mexico
- Rodolfo Alejandro Escalera, 20, Torreón, Mexico
- Karina Guadalupe Esparza Rodriguez, 17, Culiacán, Mexico
- Martín Vaca Vea, 23, Morelia, Mexico – (Former La Academia Series 3 contestant)
- Jairo Wilmont, 25, (Dominican Republic)
- Amid Guadalupe Origen, 24, Guadalajara, Mexico

=== Venezuela ===
The contestants left out of the semi-finals from Venezuela's auditions were:

- Maria Elena Rodríguez López, 16, Miranda, Venezuela
- Oscar León Oropeza, 18, Caracas, Venezuela
- Juliana Douaihy Viso, 21, Valencia, Venezuela
- Dervis Pérez Rojas, 20, Carora, Venezuela
- Gabriela Puche Parra, 22, Valencia, Venezuela
- Daniela Rizquez Ron, 21, Caracas Venezuela
- Juan Alejandro Medici Díaz, 26, Falcón, Venezuela
- Ariana Velasco Salas, 19, Caracas, Venezuela
- Richard Alejandro Núñez Rojas, 26, Caracas, Venezuela
- Paola Andrea Murillo Barrios, 20, Barquisimeto, Venezuela
- Sherezade Valentiner Cuesta, 18, Miranda, Venezuela
- Marianella Rojas Mata, 18, Caracas, Venezuela
- Atef Habib Pollino, 16, Puerto Ordaz, Venezuela
- Rossana Cavallina León, 20, Guarico, Venezuela
- Josué Eduardo García González, 25, Caracas, Venezuela
- Eugenio Keller Puente, 18, Caracas, Venezuela
- María Elena Planchart Mendoza, 26, Caracas, Venezuela
- Romina Gabriela Luis Rodriguez, 21, Maracay, Venezuela

=== Argentina ===
The contestants left out of the semi-finals from Argentina's auditions were:

- Rodrigo Tapia González, 21, La Calera, Chile – (Former Rojo Fama Contrafama contestant)
- Bárbara Sodor, 18, Buenos Aires, Argentina
- Juan Pablo Schapira, 18, Buenos Aires, Argentina
- Marcela Von der Walde, 21, Buenos Aires, Argentina
- Marianella Giangreco, 20, Salta, Argentina
- Sofía Macchi, 16, Buenos Aires, Argentina
- Daniela Sciancalepore, 17, Buenos Aires Argentina
- Mariana Geraldine Ojeda Tulián, 16, Buenos Aires Argentina
- Daniela Valeska Cevallos Bravo, 19, Santiago, Chile – (Former Rojo Fama Contrafama contestant)
- Arnaldo Peralta, 20, Buenos Aires, Argentina
- Pablo Cúndalo, 22, Buenos Aires, Argentina
- Rodrigo Massa Moreira Da Silva, 22, São Paulo, Brazil
- Giovanna Salinas Córdova, 26, Lima, Peru

=== Colombia ===
The contestants left out of the semi-finals from Colombia's auditions were:

- Xihomara Cáceres Ortiz, 21, Bucaramanga, Colombia
- Carolina Granda Saona, 19, Quito, Ecuador
- Yoser Ruiz Aguilera, 21, Bogotá, Colombia
- Luis Fabián Peña Villarreal, 22, Barranquilla, Colombia
- Melissa Mejía Flomín, 26, Bogotá, Colombia
- Kavir Sánchez Amorocho, 25, Bogotá, Colombia
- Yesid Eduardo Uribe Ordóñez, 21, Bucaramanga, Colombia
- Paul Tamayo Caviedes, 26, Bogotá, Colombia
- Luis Gabriel Cano Valencia, 26, Medellín, Colombia
- Mónica Castillo Cabeza, 26, Colombia
- José Manrique Mazuera, 18, Valle del Cauca, Colombia
- Estefanía Varela Madrid, 16, Medellín, Colombia
- Sebastián Larrañaga Arboleda, 26, Bogotá, Colombia
- Jaime Rojas Buitrago, 22, Valle del Cauca, Colombia
- Sandra Saa Morales, 22, Bogotá, Colombia
- Juan Manuel Medina Valencia, 24, Bogotá, Colombia
- Carlos Mario Kandia García, 17, Bogotá, Colombia

=== Panama ===
The contestants left out of the semi-finals from Panama's auditions were:

- José Andaluz Quezada, 22, El Salvador, San Salvador
- Shearley Beatriz Hernández Ranero, 23, Guatemala
- Robinson Pimentel Penso, 22, Caracas, Venezuela
- Brenda Lau Poon, 24, Betania, Panama (Former VIVE LA MUSICA contestant)
- Ibeth Samaniego Vergara, 19, Panama

Preceded by Season 2 (2007)	Latin American Idol; Season 3 (2008)	Succeeded by Season 4 (2009)
