= Latin American Idol season 2 =

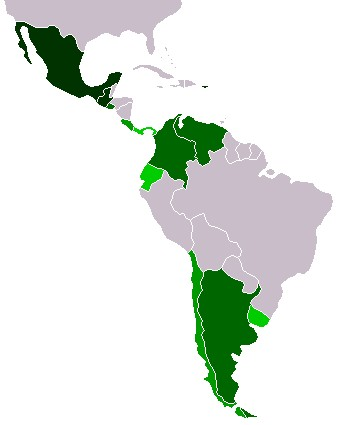
Top 3 (dark green), Top 12 (slightly dark green), Top 30 (green) and Top 100 (light green)

The second season of Latin American Idol premiered on June 13, 2007, and continued until September 27, 2007, when it was won by Guatemalan born Carlos Peña. Auditions were held in Caracas, Bogotá, Mexico City, and Buenos Aires in the spring of 2007. The concerts began on July in Buenos Aires, Argentina, the host country. For this season the judge Elizabeth Meza quit, and the Mexican singer Mimi was hired as the new Latin American Idol judge. At age 19, Peña is the first male and youngest person to win the competition, and second winner to never have been in the bottom two or three.

== Top 12 Finalists ==
Carlos Enrique Peña Aldana - Winner (09/27/2007)
1. "Tu Reputación" (Ricardo Arjona) – First Workshop
2. "Usted Se Me Llevó La Vida" (Alexandre Pires) – First Concert
3. "Quiero Dormir Cansado" (Emmanuel) – Second Concert
4. "Detalles" (Roberto Carlos) – Third Concert
5. "Bésame" (Ricardo Montaner) – Fourth Concert
6. "Fruta Fresca" (Carlos Vives) – Fifth Concert
7. "La Media Vuelta" (Luis Miguel) – Sixth Concert
8. "Ella" (Pedro Infante) – Sixth Concert
9. "Contigo en la Distancia" (Luis Miguel) – Seventh Concert
10. "Si Tú No Estas" (Franco De Vita) – Seventh Concert
11. "Cuando" (Ricardo Arjona) – Eighth Concert
12. "Corazón Partío" (Alejandro Sanz) – Eighth Concert
13. "Con una Canción" (Written for the show) – Ninth Concert
14. "Usted Se Me Llevó La Vida" (Alexandre Pires) – Ninth Concert
15. "Cada Palabra" (Written for the show) – Ninth Concert

Ricardo Caballero Tostado - Runner-up (09/27/2007)
1. "La Fuerza del Corazón" (Alejandro Sanz) – First Workshop
2. "Volver A Amar" (Cristian Castro) – First Concert
3. "Detenedla Ya" (Emmanuel) – Second Concert
4. "Santa Lucía" (Miguel Mateos) – Third Concert
5. "La Cima del Cielo" (Ricardo Montaner) – Fourth Concert
6. "Tragedia" (Marc Anthony) – Fifth Concert
7. "Si Nos Dejan" (Luis Miguel) – Sixth Concert
8. "El Viajero" (Luis Miguel) – Sixth Concert
9. "Si Tu Supieras" (Alejandro Fernández) – Seventh Concert
10. "¿Y Si Fuera Ella?" (Alejandro Sanz) – Seventh Concert
11. "La Gota Fría" (Carlos Vives) – Eighth Concert
12. "No Se Tú" (Luis Miguel) – Eighth Concert
13. "Cada Palabra" (Written for the show) – Ninth Concert
14. "La Fuerza del Corazón" (Alejandro Sanz) – Ninth Concert
15. "Con una Canción" (Written for the show) – Ninth Concert

Rosangela Abreu Crespo - Eliminated (09/20/2007)
1. "Quitame Ese Hombre" (Pilar Montenegro) – First Workshop
2. "Sola Otra Vez" (Celine Dion) – Wild Card Workshop
3. "Lloviendo Estrellas" (Cristian Castro) – First Concert
4. "Amor Total" (Emmanuel) – Second Concert
5. "Me Cuesta Tanto Olvidarte" (Mecano) – Third Concert
6. "El Poder de Tu Amor" (Ricardo Montaner) – Fourth Concert
7. "Así Es La Vida" (Olga Tañón) – Fifth Concert
8. "El Reloj" (Luis Miguel) – Sixth Concert
9. "Volver, volver" (Ana Gabriel) – Sixth Concert
10. "Ahora que te vas" (La 5a. Estación) – Seventh Concert
11. "Entre Tú y Mil Mares" (Laura Pausini) – Seventh Concert
12. "A Puro Dolor" (Son By Four) – Eighth Concert
13. "Como Olvidar" (Olga Tañón) – Eighth Concert

Arquimedes Adalberto Reyes Torres - Eliminated (09/13/2007)
1. "Dispuesto a Amarte" (Luciano Pereyra) – First Workshop
2. "Daría" (La 5a. Estación) – First Concert
3. "Insoportablemente Bella" (Hernaldo Zúñiga) – Second Concert
4. "Lobo Hombre en París" (La Unión) – Third Concert
5. "Me Va a Extrañar" (Ricardo Montaner) – Fourth Concert
6. "La Cadena de Oro" (Cabas) – Fifth Concert
7. "Echame a mi la culpa" (Luis Miguel) – Sixth Concert
8. "Luz de Luna" (Rocío Dúrcal) – Sixth Concert
9. "Burbujas de Amor" (Juan Luis Guerra) – Seventh Concert
10. "Vivir Sin Aire" (Maná) – Seventh Concert

Silvia Elizabeth De Freitas Mejías - Eliminated (09/06/2007)
1. "Por Amarte Así" (Cristian Castro) – Second Workshop
2. "Algo Más" (La 5a. Estación) – First Concert
3. "Todo Se Derrumbó Dentro De Mi" (Emmanuel) – Second Concert
4. "Eternamente Bella" (Alejandra Guzmán) – Third Concert
5. "Cuando a mi lado estás" (Ricardo Montaner) – Fourth Concert
6. "Se Me Olvidó Otra Vez" (Maná) – Fifth Concert
7. "Amaneci en tus brazos" (Ana Belén) – Sixth Concert
8. "Amor Eterno" (Rocío Dúrcal) – Sixth Concert

Francisco José Pérez Arciniegas - Eliminated (08/30/2007)
1. "No Sé Olvidar" (Alejandro Fernández) – Second Workshop
2. "Si Te Vas" (Alejandro Fernández) – First Concert
3. "Tú Y Yo" (Emmanuel) – Second Concert
4. "Otro Día Más Sin Verte" (Jon Secada) – Third Concert
5. "Si Tuviera Que Elegir" (Ricardo Montaner) – Fourth Concert
6. "Escuchame" (Carlos Ponce) – Fifth Concert

Saúl Armando Alvidrez Aragon - Eliminated (08/23/2007)
1. "Dormir Contigo" (Luis Miguel) – Third Workshop
2. "Dímelo" (Marc Anthony) – First Concert
3. "Pobre Diablo" (Emmanuel) – Second Concert
4. "Bella Sin Alma" (Víctor Manuelle) – Third Concert
5. "Castillo Azul" (Ricardo Montaner) – Fourth Concert

Emiliano Sansone - Eliminated (08/16/2007)
1. "Te Mando Flores" (Fonseca) – Third Workshop
2. "Amarte Es Un Placer" (Luis Miguel) – First Concert
3. "Seguía Lloviendo Afuera" (Emmanuel) – Second Concert
4. "La Cosa más Bella" (Eros Ramazzotti) – Third Concert

Samantha Rae Byars - Eliminated (08/09/2007)
1. "Soy Yo" (Marta Sánchez) – Second Workshop
2. "Angeles Caídos" (Alejandra Guzmán) – Wild Card Workshop
3. "Ven Conmigo" (Christina Aguilera) – First Concert
4. "Corazón De Melao" (Emmanuel) – Second Concert

Juan Pablo Villacorta - Eliminated (08/09/2007)
1. "Desnudate Mujer" (David Bisbal) – Second Workshop
2. "Como Se Cura Una Herida" (Jaci Velasquez) – First Concert
3. "Es Mi Mujer" (Emmanuel) – Second Concert

Emiliano Roque - Eliminated (08/02/2007)
1. "Un Beso y Una Flor" (Nino Bravo) – Third Workshop
2. "Fuego Contra Fuego" (Ricky Martin) – Wild Card Workshop
3. "Y Tú Te Vas" (Chayanne) – First Concert

Julián Rubino - Eliminated (08/02/2007)
1. "Quiero Morir En Tu Veneno" (Alejandro Sanz) – Third Workshop
2. "Lloraré Las Penas" (David Bisbal) – First Concert

=== Performers on results shows ===
- Week 1 (August 2) – Belinda performed "Luz Sin Gravedad".
- Week 2 (August 9) – Emmanuel performed "Sentirme Vivo".
- Week 3 (August 16) – Diego Torres performed "Abriendo Caminos" and "Hasta Cuando".
- Week 4 (August 23) – Ricardo Montaner performed "Echame a mi la culpa"
- Week 5 (August 30) – Mijares performed "Para Amarnos Más"
- Week 6 (September 6) – No Performer
- Week 7 (September 13) – Hernán López Sosa performed "Deuda" and "Flaca".
- Week 8 (September 20) – Gloria Trevi performed "Todos Me Miran".
- Week 9 (September 27) – Paulina Rubio performed "Ni Una Sola Palabra" and "Nada Puede Cambiarme", Efraín Medina performed "Trataré de Olvidarte", Miranda! performed "Perfecta" and "Prisionero", and Juanes performed "Es Por Ti" and "Me Enamora".

== Elimination chart ==
Semi-finalists are in alphabetical order by last name, and finalists by reverse chronological order of elimination.

Legend
Female	Male	Top 12	Top 30

Stages:		Semi-Finalists				Finals								
Weeks:		7/5	7/12	7/19	7/25	8/2	8/9	8/16	8/23	8/30	9/6	9/13	9/20	9/27
Place	Contestant	Result												
1	Carlos Peña	Top 12												Winner
2	Ricardo Caballero	Top 12						Btm 4			Btm 3			Runner-up
3	Rosangela Abreu Crespo	Elim			Top 12						Btm 3		Elim	
4	Arquimedes Torres	Top 12								Btm 2		Elim		
5	Silvia De Freitas		Top 12					Btm 3	Btm 3		Elim			
6	Francisco Perez		Top 12			Btm 3	Btm 3	Btm 2	Btm 2	Elim				
7	Saul Alvidrez			Top 12					Elim					
8	Emiliano Sansone			Top 12				Elim						
9–10	Samantha Byars	Elim			Top 12		Elim							
9–10	Juan Pablo Villacorta		Top 12			Btm 4	Elim							
11–12	Emiliano Roque			Elim	Top 12	Elim								
11–12	Julian Rubino			Top 12		Elim								
Semi	Diana Amarilla		Elim		Elim									
Semi	Edgar Alvidrez		Elim		Elim									
Semi	Loretto Canales		Elim		Elim									
Semi	Daniela Maya	Elim			Elim									
Semi	Ezequiel Pincheiro			Elim	Elim									
Semi	Mayda Rivera			Elim	Elim									
Semi	Miguel Garces			Elim										
Semi	Vanessa Gonzalez			Elim										
Semi	Paulina Pagoaga			Elim										
Semi	Azucena Del Toro			Elim										
Semi	Johans Cruz		Elim											
Semi	Karla Florez		Elim											
Semi	Judith Leyva		Elim											
Semi	Angel Mariño		Elim											
Semi	Juan Carlos Diaz	Elim												
Semi	Maribel Elizondo	Elim												
Semi	Carlos Jiménez	Elim												
Semi	Lina Uribe	Elim												

== Semi-finals (Top 30) ==
=== First Workshop ===
Held on July 4, 2007. The semi-finalists eliminated from the competition were:

Maribel Escobedo Buñuelos
1. "No Te Pido Flores" (Fanny Lú)

Carlos Jiménez Rodríguez
1. "Así Como Hoy" (Marc Anthony)

Lina María Uribe López
1. "Si Te Vas" (Shakira)

Juan Carlos Díaz Palacios
1. "Abrazar La Vida" (Luis Fonsi)

=== Second Workshop ===
Held on July 11, 2007. The semi-finalists eliminated from the competition were:

Johans Antonio Cruz Muñoz
1. "Hasta Que Te Conocí" (Juan Gabriel)

Karla Janeth Flórez Hernandez
1. "Ya No Quiero" (Jesse & Joy)

Judith Amelia Leyva Salcido
1. "Otro Amor Vendrá" (Lara Fabian)

Angel Rolando Francisco Mariño
1. "Invierno" (Reik)

=== Third Workshop ===
Held on July 18, 2007. The semi-finalists eliminated from the competition were:

Miguel Alejandro Garcés Contreras
1. "Va Por Ti" (Camila)

Vanessa González Leal
1. "Yo Si Me Enamoré" (Huey Dunbar)

María Azucena Del Toro Hermosillo
1. "Detrás de Mi Ventana" (Yuri)

Paulina Fagoaga Y García
1. "Imaginame Sin Ti" (Luis Fonsi)

=== Wild Card Workshop ===
For this workshop, there were originally six people out of the three semi-final groups that would have a second chance to become the tenth and last finalist. On the Third Workshop results, it was announced that three more semifinalists would join the Wild Card Workshop. It was held on July 25, 2007. On the same night, it was announced that there were going to be three finalists chosen from this group, instead of just one like the previous season, creating now a Top 12. The semi-finalists eliminated from the competition were:

Daniela Maya Olavarría
1. "Escondidos" (Olga Tañón feat. Cristian Castro)
2. "Quiero Perderme En Tu Cuerpo" (David Bisbal)

Loretto Macarena Canales Galdames
1. "Genio Atrapado" (Christina Aguilera)
2. "Aprendíz" (Alejandro Sanz)

Edgar Isaac Alvidrez Aragón
1. "Mi Vida Sin Tu Amor" (Cristian Castro)
2. "Volverás" (Ricky Martin)

Mayda Belén Rivera González
1. "Si Una Vez" (Selena)
2. "Solo Tú" (Jaci Velasquez)

Hector Ezequiel Pinchiero
1. "Se Supone" (Luis Fonsi)
2. "Tan Enamorados" (Ricardo Montaner)

Diana Rosario Amarilla
1. "A Fuego Lento" (Rosana Arbelo)
2. "Amar Sin Ser Amada" (Thalía)

== Top 100 ==
Argentina

• Esteban Peleteiro

• Silvana Condoruci

• Solmi Rodríguez

• Micaela Salinas

• María de los Angeles Monasterio

• Leonel Copiz

• Celeste Ruiz

• María Delfina Peña

• Esteban Maestre

• Virginia Modica

• Mercedes Pieretti

• Manuel Salas

• Paula Reus

Chile

• Licetty Alfaro

• Aylyn Vicencio

• Marco Antonio Pino (Top 30 from Season 1)

Colombia

• Lina María Paredes

• Viviana Saa

• Jonathan Reyes

• Ángelo Paredes

• Diego Gamboa

• Ángela María Forero

• Carolina Muñoz

• Juliana Muñoz

• Sandra Milena Serrato

Costa Rica

• Zaida Dobles

• Angie Valverde

Ecuador

• Jessie Almeida

El Salvador

• Carlos Ernesto Alfaro

Mexico

• Thalía Vargas

• Guillermo Nieto

• Sergio Arzate

• Daniela Gallardo

• Érica Grovas

• Natalia Leal

• Héctor Trejo

• Gerardo Cerrillo

• Héctor Silva del Castillo

Panama

• Amanda Herrera

• Karen Peralta

Puerto Rico

• Jorge Monserrat (Top 30 from Season 1)

• Alejandro Irizarry

• Esteban Núñez

Uruguay

• Martín Ramírez

• Juan Cerviño

• Stefanie Álvarez

• Pablo Ferraz

Venezuela

• Adabella Núñez

• Alberto Silva

• Stephanie Argüello

• Andrea Galindo

• Reynaldo Mercier

• Rosalba Bueno (Top 30 from Season 1)

• Nerymar Sanó (Winner of Venezuela's reality show "Fama y Aplausos")

• Víctor Síndar

• Giovanna Pisani

• Simón López Chacín

• Andrea Silva

• Homero Briceño

• Raynier Álvarez

• Sanyer Nelo

Preceded by Season 1 (2006)	Latin American Idol; Season 2 (2007)	Succeeded by Season 3 (2008)
