= María José =

- Gender: Female
- Language: Spanish

Maria José
- Gender: Female
- Language: Portuguese

María José is a Spanish language female given name. Maria José is a Portuguese language female given name. It is a combination of the names María and José, often given in reference to the mother and foster father of Jesus.

Notable persons with either of these names include:

- María José (singer) (born 1976), Mexican singer and dancer
  - María José (album), her debut album
- Maria José of Portugal (1857–1943), Portuguese infanta
- Maria José Aguiar (artist), Portuguese artist
- Maria José Aguiar (politician) (born 1968), Portuguese politician
- María José Alcalá (born 1971), Mexican diver
- María José Alcón (1961–2018), Spanish politician
- María José Alfonso (born 1940), Spanish actress
- María José Alonso (born 1958), Spanish pharmacologist
- María José Alvarado (1995–2014), Honduran beauty queen
- Maria José Alves (born 1977), Brazilian Paralympic athlete
- María José Argaña Mateu, Paraguayan politician, businesswoman and diplomat
- María José Argeri (born 1984), Argentine tennis player
- Maria José Batista de Sales (born 1969), Brazilian handball player
- María José Beaumont, Navarrese politician
- Maria José Bertolotti (born 1966), Brazilian basketball player
- María José Bongiorno, Argentine politician
- Marie José Burki (born 1961), Swiss video artist and educator
- María José Campos, Argentine chess player
- María José Cantilo (1953–2022), Argentine singer and songwriter
- María José Caro, Peruvian writer
- Maria Jose Carrion, Ecuadorian politician
- María José Castillo (born 1990), Costa Rican singer
  - María José (EP)
- María José Catalá (born 1981), Spanish politician
- María José Cristerna, Mexican lawyer, businesswoman, activist and tattoo artist
- Maria José Dupré (1905–1984), Brazilian writer
- María José Ferrada (born 1977), Chilean writer and journalist
- María José Frápolli (born 1960), Spanish philosopher
- María José de la Fuente (born 1988), Bolivian artistic gymnast
- María José Gaidano (born 1973), Argentine tennis player and coach
- María José García Borge (born 1956), Spanish scientist and nuclear scientist
- María José García-Pelayo (born 1968), Spanish politician
- María José Gatica, Chilean politician
- Maria José Gonzaga (1946–2021), Portuguese politician and businesswoman
- María José González Revuelta (born 1972), Spanish politician
- María José Goyanes (born 1948), Spanish actress
- María José Granatto (born 1995), Argentine field hockey player
- María José Guerra Palmero (born 1962), Spanish philosopher
- María José Hoffmann (born 1976), Chilean politician
- María José Iturbide, Guatemalan politician and biologist
- María José Llergo (born 1994), Spanish singer
- María José Llorca (born 1970), Spanish tennis player
- María José López, multiple people
- María José Lubertino (born 1959), Argentine lawyer and politician
- María José Maldonado (born 1985), Paraguayan beauty queen and singer
- María José Mardomingo (born 1969), Spanish hurdler
- María José Marenco (born 1976), Salvadoran swimmer
- María José Mariscal (born 2005), Mexican actress
- Maria José Marques da Silva (1914–1996), Portuguese architect
- María José Martínez, multiple people
- María José Mata Cocco (born 1994), Mexican swimmer
- María José Maza (born 1990), Ecuadorian model and beauty pageant titleholder
- María José Montiel (born 1968), Spanish opera mezzo-soprano
- María José Moreno (born 1967), Spanish light lyric soprano
- Maria José Nogueira Pinto (1952–2011), Portuguese politician
- María José Orellana (born 1981), Guatemalan beach volleyball player
- María José Oyarzún (born 1982), Chilean constituent
- María José Palacios (born 1998), Ecuadorian boxer
- María José Pizarro (born 1978), Colombian politician
- María José Plaza, Ecuadorian politician
- María José Poncell, Chilean sailor
- María José Pons (born 1984), Spanish football goalkeeper
- María José Poves (born 1978), Spanish race walker
- María José Prieto (born 1977), Chilean actress
- María José Pueyo (born 1970), Spanish marathon runner
- María José Quintanilla (born 1990), Chilean singer
- María José Ribera (born 1996), Bolivian swimmer
- María José Rienda Contreras (born 1975), Spanish alpine skier
- María José Rodríguez, Spanish rhythmic gymnast
- María José Rojas (born 1987), Chilean footballer
- María José Sáenz de Buruaga (born 1968), Spanish politician
- María José Sánchez Alayeto (born 1984), Spanish tennis and pedal player
- María José Sarmiento, Argentine judge
- Maria José Schuller (born 1965), Portuguese beach volleyball player
- María José Segarra, Spanish attorney general (between 2018–2020)
- María José Sevilla (born 1949), Spanish cook and writer
- Maria José Silva (born 1983), Nicaraguan cyclist
- Maria José Uribe (born 1990), Colombian golfer
- María José Urzúa (born 1983), Chilean actress
- María José la Valenciana (1974–2018), Spanish Internet personality
- Maria José Valério (1933–2021), Portuguese musical artist
- María José Vargas (born 1993), Argentine racquetball player
- María José Vargas (cyclist) (born 1996), Costa Rican cyclist
- María José Zaldívar (born 1975), Chilean lawyer and politician

== See also ==
- José María, a male given name
