= Latin American Idol season 4 =

Latin American Idol
- Season 4
- Hosted by: Erika de la Vega
- Judges: Jon Secada, Mimí, Oscar Mediavilla

Release
- Original release: September 9 – December 10, 2009

Season chronology
- ← Previous; Season 3

The fourth and final season of Latin American Idol premiered on September 9, 2009. This season brought new changes as host Monchi Balestra and judge Gustavo Sánchez left the show. The show was hosted by Erika de la Vega. Jon Secada and Mimi returned as judges, and Oscar Mediavilla, an Argentine producer, joined as a new judge.

The auditions for season 4 were in July 2009. There was a form to fill in the Latin American Idol MySpace site to try for auditions for 2009. Auditioners had to be between the ages of 18 and 28 by August 1, 2009.

Audition dates and places for season 4 were:

- July 4, 2009 – Argentina
- July 11, 2009 – Venezuela
- July 18, 2009 – Mexico
- July 25, 2009 – Costa Rica

== Top 12 finalists ==
Martha Heredia – Winner
1. "Oye" (Beyoncé) – Second Workshop
2. "Clavado en un bar" (Maná) – First Concert
3. "Dejame ir" (Paty Cantú) – Second Concert
4. "Déjame llorar" (Ricardo Montaner) – Third Concert
5. "En Cambio No" (Laura Pausini) – Fourth Concert
6. "Te Quiero" (Nigga) – 5th Concert
7. "Burbujas de Amor" (Juan Luis Guerra) – 6th Concert
8. "La llave de mi corazón" (Juan Luis Guerra) – 6th Concert
9. "Lloro por ti" (Enrique Iglesias) – 7th Concert
10. "Colgando en tus manos" (Carlos Baute and Marta Sánchez) – 7th Concert
11. "Lagrimas Negras" (Celia Cruz) – 8th Concert
12. "Y Volvere" (Los Ángeles Negros) – 8th Concert
13. "Soy Rebelde" (Jeannette) – 9th Concert
14. "Oye!" (Beyoncé) – 9th Concert
15. "Musica" (written for the show) – 9th Concert

Eduardo Aguirre – Runner-up (12/10/2009)
1. "Yo Queria" (Cristian Castro) – First Workshop
2. "Azul" (Cristian Castro) – First Concert – Btm 6
3. "Coleccionista De Canciones" (Camila) – Second Concert
4. "La Soledad" (Laura Pausini) – Third Concert
5. "Atado a tu Amor" (Chayanne) – Fourth Concert
6. "Te Amo" (Makano) – 5th Concert
7. "La hormiguita"(Juan Luis Guerra) – 6th Concert
8. "Las avispas"(Juan Luis Guerra) – 6th Concert
9. "Odio por Amor"(Juanes) – 7th Concert
10. "Besos Faciles"(Sonohra) – 7th Concert
11. "No Tengo Dinero"(Juan Gabriel) – 8th Concert
12. "Yo soy aquél" (Raphael) – 8th Concert
13. "Musica" (written for the show) – 9th Concert
14. "La Soledad" (Laura Pausini) – 9th Concert
15. "Soy Rebelde" (Jeannette) – 9th Concert

Ruben Álvarez – Eliminated (12/03/2009)
1. "Si tu me miras" (Alejandro Sanz) – First Workshop
2. "Oye el Boom" (David Bisbal) – First Concert
3. "A Quién Tu Decidiste Amar" (Sandoval) – Second Concert
4. "La Bomba" (Ricky Martin) – Third Concert
5. "Me Huele a Soledad" (MDO) – Fourth Concert – Btm 3
6. "En la disco" (Tito El Bambino) – 5th Concert
7. "Cuando Te Beso" (Juan Luis Guerra) – 6th Concert
8. "La Travesía" (Juan Luis Guerra) – 6th Concert – Btm 3
9. "No veo la Hora" (Noel Schajris) – 7th Concert
10. "Esclavo de tus besos" (David Bisbal) – 7th Concert
11. "Mas que tu amigo" (Marco Antonio Solís) – 8th Concert
12. "Hace Calor" (Los Rodríguez) – 8th Concert

Sara Bellomo – Eliminated (11/26/2009)
1. "Lloviendo estrellas" (Cristian Castro) – Second Workshop
2. "Cenizas" (Barbara Muñoz) – First Concert
3. "Y Yo Sigo Aqui" (Paulina Rubio) – Second Concert – Btm 5
4. "Azúcar Amargo" (Fey) – Third Concert – Btm 3
5. "En su Lugar" (Yuridia) – Fourth Concert – Btm 3
6. "Perdoname" (La Factoría) – 5th Concert
7. "Bachata rosa" (Juan Luis Guerra) – 6th Concert
8. "Ojala que llueva Café" (Juan Luis Guerra) – 6th Concert – Btm 3
9. "Causa y Efecto" (Paulina Rubio) – 7th Concert
10. "Recuérdame" (La 5ª Estación) – 7th Concert

Fernando Lara- Eliminated (11/19/2009)
1. "Mientes tan bien" (Sin Bandera) – First Workshop
2. "Dame tu amor" (Luis Miguel) – First Concert
3. "Mil demonios" (Moderatto) – Second Concert
4. "Tratar de estar mejor" (Diego Torres) – Third Concert
5. "Quisiera" (Alejandro Fernández) – Fourth Concert
6. "Mayor que yo" (Wisin & Yandel) – 5th Concert
7. "La Bilirrubina" (Juan Luis Guerra) – 6th Concert
8. "Estrellita y Duendes" (Juan Luis Guerra) – 6th Concert

Lady Balarezo – Eliminated (11/12/2009)
1. "Otro amor vendrá" (Lara Fabian) – Second Workshop
2. "Y Basta ya" (Olga Tañón) – First Concert
3. "Adelante Corazon" (Daniela Romo) – Second Concert – Btm 4
4. "Mi Historia Entre tus Dedos" (Gianluca Grignani) – Third Concert (the best)
5. "Para vivir un gran amor" (Cacho Castaña) – Fourth Concert
6. "Morire" (La Factoría) – 5th Concert

Rolando López – Eliminated (11/5/2009)
1. "Gotas de Agua Dulce" (Juanes) – First Workshop
2. "Bendita tu luz" – (Maná) – First Concert – Btm 5
3. "Dime Ven" – (Motel) – Second Concert – Btm 3
4. "De Música Ligera" – (Soda Stereo) – Third Concert – Btm 2
5. "Cuando Seas Mía" – (Son by Four) – Fourth Concert

Tania Meyer – Eliminated (10/29/2009)
1. "La maldita primavera" (Yuri) – Second Workshop
2. "Dime que no" (Ricardo Arjona) – First Concert – Btm 3
3. "Espacio Sideral" (Jesse & Joy) – Second Concert
4. "Estoy Aqui" (Shakira) – Third Concert

Johan Estrada – Eliminated (10/22/2009)
1. "Mil Horas" (Andrés Calamaro) – First Workshop
2. "Quién Me Ha Robado El Mes De Abril"" (Joaquín Sabina) – First Concert – Btm 4
3. "Te soñe" (Aleks Syntek) – Second Concert

Osvaldo Conde- Eliminated (10/22/2009)
1. "Usted no sabe" (Alexandre Pires) – First Workshop
2. "Imparable" (Tommy Torres) – First Concert
3. "Que vida la mia" (Reik) – Second Concert

Ana Paula Rodriguez – Eliminated (10/15/2009)
1. "Esta Ausencia" (David Bisbal) – Second Workshop
2. "Para Llorar" (Ricardo Montaner) – First Concert

Sol Vargas – Eliminated (10/15/2009)
1. "No soy una señora" (Melissa) – Second Workshop
2. "Fuego contra fuego" (Ricky Martín) – First Concert

=== Weekly Themes ===
- Week 1 (October 14) – My Idol
- Week 2 (October 21) – Mexican Pop
- Week 3 (October 28) – Hits from the 90s
- Week 4 (November 4) – Telenovela Openings
- Week 5 (November 11) – Reggaeton
- Week 6 (November 18) – Juan Luis Guerra
- Week 7 (November 25) – Top 5 Hits
- Week 8 (December 2) – Renewed Hits of Latin Music

== Top 20 (Semifinals) ==
The Top 20 semifinalists were announced on September 24, 2009, at the end of the Theater Round. The format for the semifinals workshops this season will change having 10 male semifinalists and 10 female semifinalists who will sing in 2 separate rounds by gender, were the Top 5 from each gender will get through to the Finals. The guys will perform on September 30, and the girls on October 7 with results show on the following night. The names of the semifinalists are:

=== Elimination Chart ===
Legend
Did Not Perform	Female	Male	Top 20	Top 12	Winner

Safe	First Save	Second Save	Last Save	Eliminated

Stage:		Semi-Finals		Finals								
Week:		9/30	10/7	10/14	10/21	10/28	11/4	11/11	11/18	11/25	12/2	12/9
Place	Contestant	Result										
1	Martha Heredia		Top 5									Winner
2	Eduardo Aguirre	Top 5		Btm 6								Runner up
3	Rubén Álvarez	Top 5					Btm 3		Btm 3		Elim	
4	Sara Bellomo		Top 5		Btm 5	Btm 3	Btm 3		Btm 3	Elim		
5	Fernando Lara	Top 5							Elim			
6	Lady Balarezo		Top 5		Btm 4			Elim				
7	Rolando López	Top 5		Btm 5	Btm 3	Btm 2	Elim					
8	Tania Meyer		Top 5	Btm 3		Elim						
9–10	Johan Estrada	Top 5		Btm 4	Elim							
9–10	Osvaldo Conde	Saved			Elim							
11–12	Ana Paula Rodriguez		Saved	Elim								
11–12	Sol Vargas		Top 5	Elim								
Semi- Final 2	Ariana Dao		Elim									
Semi- Final 2	Claudia González		Elim									
Semi- Final 2	Carmen Guillén		Elim									
Semi- Final 2	Karla Cubias		Elim									
Semi- Final 1	Jonatan Fruto	Elim										
Semi- Final 1	Héctor Castillo	Elim										
Semi- Final 1	Wilker Cartaya	Elim										

Preceded by Season 3 (2008)	Latin American Idol; Season 4 (2009)	Succeeded by none
