= Maria Martinez (disambiguation) =

Maria Martinez (1887–1980) was a Native American artist and potter.

Maria Martinez may also refer to:

- Maria Martínez Abelló (died 1815), Spanish writer and salonnière
- María Martínez Acosta (1881–1977), Puerto Rican teacher and senator
- Maria Martínez Bayona (born 1989), Spanish film director and screenwriter
- María Martínez-Cañas (born 1960), Cuban-born photographer
- María Martínez (fencer) (born 1983), Venezuelan fencer
- María Martínez (footballer) (born 1999), Paraguayan footballer
- María Martínez Santillán (born 1963), Mexican politician from Michoacán
- María Martínez Sierra (1874–1974), married name of Spanish writer and politician María de la O Lejárraga
- Maria Martínez (singer), Cuban guitarist and singer
- María Martínez (volleyball), Colombian volleyball player
- María Antonia Martínez (born 1953), Spanish politician
- María del Carmen Martínez Sancho (1901–1995), Spanish mathematician
- María Cristina Martínez Córdoba, Argentine lawyer
- María Dolores Martínez Madrona (born 1986), Spanish soccer referee
- Maria Elena Martinez (1966–2014), Mexican historian of the colonial period
- María Isabel Martínez (born 1967), Spanish field hockey player
- María José Martínez Sánchez (born 1982), Spanish tennis player
- Maria L. Martinez, U.S. labor activist and community advocate
- María Luisa Martínez de García Rojas (1780–1817), insurgent in the Mexican War of Independence
- María Luz Martínez Seijo (born 1968), Spanish politician
- Maria Ramita Martinez, Picuris Pueblo potter, U.S. state of New Mexico
- María Rosa Martínez, Argentine trade unionist and politician
- Marie Seznec Martinez, French stylist and fashion model

Martinez as second surname:

- María de Jesús Patricio Martínez (born 1963), Mexican traditional medicine healer and human rights activist
- María Sornosa Martinez (born 1949), Spanish politician and Member of the European Parliament

== See also ==
- María José Martínez (disambiguation)
