= María José (disambiguation) =

María José is a female given name.

María José may also refer to:

- María José (1978 TV series)
- María José (1995 TV series)
- Maria José (1928–2020), Portuguese actress who owned a restaurant that once employed Ana Gomes
- María José (singer) (born 1976), Mexican singer and dancer
  - María José (album), her debut album
- María José (EP), an EP by María José Castillo
