= Latin American Idol season 1 =

Latin American Idol contestants during the show's first concert.

The first season of Latin American Idol premiered on Sony Entertainment Television on July 12, 2006 and continued until October 27, 2006, when it was won by Venezuelan born Mayré Martínez. Auditions were held in Caracas, Bogotá, Mexico City, and Buenos Aires in the spring of 2006. The concerts started on August 30 in Buenos Aires, Argentina, the host country.

== Concerts ==
- First Concert: Was held on August 30, 2006. The theme of the show was "My Favorite Pop Idol". It featured clips of the contestants' make over.
- Second Concert: Was held on September 6, 2006. The theme of the show was "The 80's". It featured clips of the contestants' visit to a spa.
- Third Concert: Was held on September 13, 2006. The theme of the show was "Spanish-American Singers". It featured clips of the contestants in a recording studio.
- Fourth Concert: Was held on September 20, 2006. The theme of the show was "Songs By Franco De Vita", who was also a guest judge. It featured clips of the contestants visiting the Hard Rock Café in Buenos Aires. On results' day, before the bottom three were announced, the seven contestants performed "Si La Ves" with Franco De Vita.
- Fifth Concert: Was held on September 27, 2006. The theme of the show was "Tribute To Women". It featured clips of the contestants at Franco De Vita's concert at the Opera Theater in Buenos Aires.
- Sixth Concert: Was held on October 4, 2006. The theme of the show was "Latin Rhythms". It featured clips of the contestants in a Ricardo Arjona concert, and also clips of them visiting Parque de la Costa, a theme park. They sang two songs for the show.
- Seventh Concert:. Was held on October 11, 2006. The theme of the show was "Rock In Spanish". It featured clips of the contestants signing autographs, sunbathing on a boat and receiving the visit of their close relatives. As music and judge guest was the group Plastilina Mosh from Mexico.
- Eighth Concert: Was held on October 18, 2006. The theme of the show was "Top 40 Popular Songs". It featured clips of the contestants during a photoshoot, and a relaxing day, where they were asked what they'd do first, should they win the competition.
- Final: Was held on October 25, 2006. The two final contestants sang three songs for the show: their favourite song, selected from the ones they had sung throughout the contest, and two songs specially composed for the show. One of the new songs was composed by Jon Secada, and the other one by Obie Bermúdez and Sebastián Chris. Each contestant performed both songs. The results' show lasted one and a half hours and featured the performances of several well-known Latin American groups and singers: Estéfano, Los Amigos Invisibles, Fonseca and finally Sin Bandera. Mayré Martinez was crowned as the first Latin American Idol.

== Finalists ==
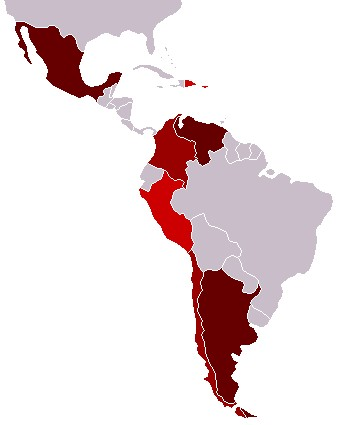
Top 3 (dark red), Top 10 (red) and Semifinals (light red)

Mayré Martínez - Winner (10/26/2006)
1. "Héroe" (Mariah Carey) - First Workshop
2. "La Cima Del Cielo" (Ricardo Montaner) - First Concert
3. "Te Amo" (Franco De Vita) - Second Concert
4. "¿Dónde Está La Vida?" (Francisco Céspedes) - Third Concert
5. "Esta Vez" (Franco De Vita) - Fourth Concert
6. "Tú" (Shakira) - Fifth Concert
7. "Mi Bombón" (Cabas) - Sixth Concert
8. "Corazón Espinado" (Maná) - Sixth Concert
9. "Rayando El Sol" (Maná) - Seventh Concert
10. "Obsesión" (Miguel Mateos) - Seventh Concert
11. "Vuelve" (Ricky Martin) - Eighth Concert
12. "Experiencia Religiosa" (Enrique Iglesias) - Eighth Concert
13. "Quiero Soñar" (Written for the show by Obie Bermúdez and Sebastián Chris) - Ninth Concert
14. "Corazón Espinado" (Maná) - Ninth Concert
15. "Soy Mi Destino" (Written for the show by Jon Secada) - Ninth Concert

Noelia Soto - Runner-up (10/26/2006)
1. "Bésame" (Ricardo Montaner) - Third Workshop
2. "Inevitable" (Shakira) - First Concert
3. "Como Un Día De Domingo" (Kesia) - Second Concert
4. "Tómame O Déjame" (Mocedades) - Third Concert
5. "Si Quieres Decir Adiós" (Franco De Vita) - Fourth Concert
6. "Mujer Contra Mujer" (Mecano) - Fifth Concert
7. "La Tortura" (Shakira) - Sixth Concert
8. "Se Me Olvidó Otra Vez" (Maná) - Sixth Concert
9. "Mariposa Technicolor" (Fito Páez) - Seventh Concert
10. "Mentira" (La Ley) - Seventh Concert- Bottom 2 (10/12/2006)
11. "Casi" (Soraya) - Eighth Concert
12. "Daría" (La Quinta Estación) - Eighth Concert
13. "Soy Mi Destino" (Written for the show by Jon Secada) - Ninth Concert
14. "Inevitable" (Shakira) - Ninth Concert
15. "Quiero Soñar" (Written for the show by Obie Bermúdez and Sebastián Chris) - Ninth Concert

Efraín Medina - Eliminated (10/19/2006)
1. "Amarte Así" (Aventura) - Third Workshop
2. "Sueños" (Diego Torres) - First Concert - Bottom 2 (08/31/2006)
3. "Perdóname" (Camilo Sesto) - Second Concert - Bottom 2 (09/07/2006)
4. "Vida Loca" (Francisco Céspedes) - Third Concert
5. "Traigo Una Pena" (Franco De Vita) - Fourth Concert
6. "Simplemente Amigos" (Ana Gabriel) - Fifth Concert - Bottom 3 (09/28/2006)
7. "Así Es La Vida" (Elefante) - Sixth Concert
8. "Cara Luna" (Bacilos) - Sixth Concert - Bottom 2 (10/05/2006)
9. "Temblando" (Unknown) - Seventh Concert
10. "La Flaca" (Jarabe de Palo) - Seventh Concert
11. "Pisando Fuerte" (Alejandro Sanz) - Eighth Concert
12. "Laura" (Nek) - Eighth Concert

Gabriel Suárez - Eliminated (10/12/2006)
1. "Hasta Ayer" (Marc Anthony) - First Workshop
2. "No Me Conoces" (Marc Anthony) - First Concert
3. "El Hombre Del Piano" (Ana Belén) - Second Concert
4. "La Copa Rota" (Vicente Fernández) - Third Concert
5. "Cálido Y Frío" (Franco De Vita) - Fourth Concert - Bottom 2 (09/21/2006)
6. "No Renunciaré" (Lolita Flores) - Fifth Concert
7. "Carito" (Carlos Vives) - Sixth Concert
8. "La Camisa Negra" (Juanes) - Sixth Concert
9. "En La Ciudad De La Furia" (Soda Stereo) - Seventh Concert
10. "Lamento Boliviano" (Los Enanitos Verdes) - Seventh Concert

Hernán López Sosa - Eliminated (10/05/2006)
1. "Celos" (Marc Anthony) - Third Workshop
2. "Un Vestido Y Un Amor" (Fito Páez) - First Concert
3. "Yolanda" (Pablo Milanés) - Second Concert
4. "Sólo Le Pido A Dios" (León Gieco) - Third Concert - Bottom 2 (09/14/2006)
5. "Louis" (Franco De Vita) - Fourth Concert - Bottom 3 (09/21/2006)
6. "Contigo" (Joaquín Sabina) - Fifth Concert - Bottom 2 (09/28/2006)
7. "Algo Contigo" (Andrés Calamaro) - Sixth Concert
8. "Carnaval Toda La Vida" (Los Fabulosos Cadillacs) - Sixth Concert

Andrea del Valle Bela - Eliminated (09/28/2006)
1. "Si Tú Eres Mi Hombre" (La India) - Second Workshop
2. "Víveme" (Laura Pausini) - First Concert
3. "¿Por qué Me Abandonaste?" (Paloma San Basilio) - Second Concert
4. "Para vivir" (Pablo Milánes) - Third Concert - Bottom 3 (09/14/2006)
5. "Buen Perdedor" (Franco De Vita) - Fourth Concert
6. "No Llores Por Mi, Argentina" (Paloma San Basilio) - Fifth Concert

John Paul Ospina - Eliminated (09/21/2006)
1. "Castillo Azul" (Ricardo Montaner) - First Workshop
2. "Mi Soledad Y Yo" (Alejandro Sanz) - Wild Card Workshop
3. "Déjame Entrar" (Carlos Vives) - First Concert
4. "¿Y Cómo Es Él?" (José Luis Perales) - Second Concert - Bottom 3 (09/07/2006)
5. "América" (Tiro de Gracia) - Third Concert
6. "Fuera De Este Mundo" (Franco De Vita) - Fourth Concert

Isa Katherine Mosquera - Eliminated (09/14/2006)
1. "En El 2000" (Natalia Lafourcade) - Second Workshop
2. "Como Hemos Cambiado" (Presuntos Implicados) - First Concert - Bottom 3 (08/31/2006)
3. "Me Cuesta Tanto Olvidarte" (Mecano) - Second Concert
4. "¿Quién Te Cantará?" (Mocedades) - Third Concert

Lilia "Lily" Ivonne Mariñelarena Ramírez - Eliminated (09/07/2006)
1. "Mi Reflejo" (Christina Aguilera) - First Workshop
2. "El Amor Que Soñé" (Mariah Carey) - First Concert
3. "Quiero Amanecer Con Alguien" (Daniela Romo) - Second Concert

Dennis Smith - Eliminated (08/31/2006)
1. "Nada Fue Un Error" (Coti Sorokin & Andrés Calamaro) - Second Workshop
2. "El Día Que Me Quieras" (Luis Miguel) - First Concert

=== Bottom three statistics ===
Date	Theme	Bottom Three
August 30	My Favorite Pop Idol	Dennis Smith	Efraín Medina	Isa Mosquera
September 6	The 80's	Lilia Mariñelarena	Efraín Medina (2)	John Paul Ospina
September 13	Spanish-American Singers	Isa Mosquera (2)	Hernán López	Andrea del Valle
September 20	Songs By Franco De Vita	John Paul Ospina (2)	Gabriel Suárez	Hernán López (2)
September 27	Tribute To Women	Andrea del Valle (2)	Hernán López (3)	Efraín Medina (3)
		Bottom Two
October 4	Latin Rhythms	Hernán López (4)	Efraín Medina (4)
October 11	Rock In Spanish	Gabriel Suárez (2)	Noelia Soto
		Final Three
October 18	Top 40 Popular Songs	Efraín Medina (5)
October 25	Final 2	Noelia Soto (2)	Mayré Martínez

== Semi-finals ==
=== First Workshop ===
Held on August 2, 2006. The semi-finalists eliminated from the competition were:

Marco Antonio Pino Arenas
1. "María" (Ricky Martin)

Carlos Alberto Montaño Uribe
1. "Quiero Verte Sonreír" (Carlos Vives)

Evelyn de la Luz Nieto Aguirre
1. "Si La Ves" (Franco De Vita)

Giuliana Mónica Chávez Otiniano
1. "Será Que No Me Amas" (Luis Miguel)

Heide Pollidore
1. "Ven Conmigo (Solamente Tú)" (Christina Aguilera)

=== Second Workshop ===
Held on August 9, 2006. It had a musical guest appearance by Julieta Venegas. The semi-finalists eliminated from the competition were:

Gustavo Giallatini
1. "Ayer" (Luis Miguel)

Mariela Josid
1. "Si tú no estás aqui" (Rosana)

Oscar Patiño
1. Imaginame Sin Ti" (Luis Fonsi)

Julio G. Cerrillo
1. "Si No Te Hubieras Ido" (Marco Antonio Solís)

Hana Kobayashi
1. "Puedes Contar Conmigo" (La Oreja de Van Gogh)

=== Third Workshop ===
Held on August 16, 2006. The semi-finalists eliminated from the competition were:

Ana Paula Rodríguez
1. "Lloran Las Rosas" (Cristian Castro)

Ninfa Molina
1. "Él Me Mintió" (Amanda Miguel)

Noel Alejandro Pérez
1. "Tanto La Quería" (Andy & Lucas)

Ricardo Malfatti Hernández
1. "Canta Corazón" (Alejandro Fernández)

Rosalba Bueno González
1. "Estoy Aquí" (Rosario Flores)

=== Wild Card Workshop ===
There were six people out of the three semi-final groups that had a second chance to become the tenth and last finalist, on a workshop that was held on August 23, 2006.

Sergio Muñiz Tapia
1. "Corazón Partío" (Alejandro Sanz)
2. "Me Va A Extrañar" (Ricardo Montaner)

Kintaró Mori Ochoa
1. "Abrázame" (Camila)
2. "Dígale" (David Bisbal)

Edgardo Monserrat
1. "Cómo He De Vivir Sin Tu Cariño" (Danny Rivera)
2. "Nunca Voy A Olvidarte" (Cristian Castro)

Laura Inés Mayolo
1. "El Amor Después Del Amor" (Fito Páez)
2. "Todo A Pulmón" (Alejandro Lerner)

Daniel Donoso
1. "Contigo En La Distancia" (Luis Miguel)
2. "Yesterday" (Boyz II Men)

Preceded by None	Latin American Idol; Season 1 (2006)	Succeeded by Season 2 (2007)
