= Arquímedes Reyes =

Salvadoran singer (born 1981)

- Born: Arquimedes Adalberto Reyes Torres; January 26, 1981 (age 45); San Alejo, La Unión, El Salvador
- Genres: Pop, Latin, opera
- Occupation: Professional Singer
- Instruments: Vocals, Guitar.

Arquímedes Reyes (born January 26, 1981) is a Salvadoran singer who is participating as a contestant in the 2nd season of Latin American Idol. He finished fourth in the contest behind Carlos Peña from Guatemala, Ricardo Caballero Tostado from Mexico, and Rosangela Abreu Crespo from Puerto Rico.

He is the youngest of 10 brothers and sisters, and the only one to pursue a singing career. Music arrived into his life by means of his grandfather and his uncle, who were musicians, and his mother who used to sing with them. The three formed a band when his mother was still young and single. Once his mother got married, she dedicated herself to her family, giving up music entirely. Every time his mother sang and played the guitar at home, she was touched so deeply to the point of crying. This is how Arquimedes' passion for music was born. Music remained in the family as Arquimedes inherited his mother's talent. However, he was more interested in the realm of Opera for what he has had extensive vocal training. Hence, the acuteness of his voice and his classical lyrical timber matches his scrawny appearance. Like some of the greatest voices in the world, the sound of his voice is almost transgenderous and can appeal to both men and women alike.

He made the transition into Pop music after discovering that Opera would not sell records and would not give him the lifestyle he was accustomed to in his middle class upbringing. After making it to the finals in the Festival Juvenil de la Cancion in El Salvador, he was invited to participate in the show “FAMA contra FAMA”” of the Chilean National Television, in Santiago, Chile along with other 17 competitors from other countries. As a result, he resided in Chile for 6 months and gained fame outside the Salvadoran borders.

In addition, He studied International Relations at UES, University of El Salvador, but he had to make a choice between his singing career and his studies. He chose singing, postponing his studies for a later time.

He stated at ROJO that being an international singer was always his childhood dream and now it has come true.
