= Abre Tu Corazón =

Single by María José Castillo

from the album María José
- A-side: "Vuela" (Release cancelled)
- Released: November 25, 2008
- Recorded: 2008
- Genre: Pop, Latin pop
- Length: 3:25
- Label: Sony BMG Latin America
- Songwriter(s): Sebastian Mellino, Luis "Darta" Sarmiento

María José Castillo singles chronology
"Abre Tu Corazón" (2008)	"Vuela" (2009)

"Abre Tu Corazón" (Translated: Open Your Heart) is the lead off single from María José Castillo's first studio album, María José.

== Background and promotion ==
The single was set to be released on a CD single, but due to the failure of Castillo's "María José" internationally it was cancelled. The CD single was set to include the album version of the song, the instrumental version, the a cappella version, her second single "Vuela" and others. Even that the release was cancelled, a fan made version of the CD single is often found by fans.

Castillo did not film any music video for the song, but fan-made videos using several live performances, mixes from public appearances, and her performances on Latin American Idol are available.

== Track listings ==
The following track listings are for the original track listing of the CD single and the fan-made CD single track listing respectively.

Original CD single track listing

1. "Abre Tu Corazón" (Album version) — 3:25
2. "Abre Tu Corazón" (Instrumental) — 3:30
3. "Abre Tu Corazón" (A Capella) — 2:33
4. "Abre Tu Corazón" (Live at Latin American Idol) — 3:46

Fan-Made CD Single

1. "Abre Tu Corazón" (Album version) — 3:25
2. "Abre Tu Corazón" Live at Latin American Idol) — 3:46
