= Ricardo Caballero =

Ricardo Caballero may refer to:

- Ricardo J. Caballero, Chilean macroeconomist
- Ricardo Caballero Tostado, Mexican singer and television star
