= Martha Heredia =

- Born: Martha Roseli Heredia Rivas; February 4, 1991 (age 35); Santiago de los Caballeros, Dominican Republic
- Occupation: Singer
- Years active: 2004–present
- Known for: Winning Latin American Idol (season 4)
- Musical career
- Genres: R&B, Latin, reggaeton
- Instrument: Vocals
- Labels: Sony BMG, META MUSIC

Martha Heredia Rivas (born February 1, 1991), also known as La Baby (The Baby), is a Dominican singer and winner of the fourth and last season of the singing competition television series Latin American Idol.

== History ==
Martha Roseli Heredia Rivas was born in Santiago de los Caballeros, Dominican Republic, on February 1, 1991. She is the daughter of Felipe Heredia and Maritza Rivas. She started singing and writing songs at the age of fifteen and formed her first group called Una Vía singing hip hop, reggaeton and other genres of urban music with her brother Luis Felipe. Heredia later had the opportunity of working in the United States of America where she created and wrote her own songs. Since her rise to fame after Latin American Idol, she has become a successful artist working in the USA and in the Dominican Republic.

== Latin American Idol ==
At 18, Heredia traveled to San José, Costa Rica to audition for the fourth season of Latin American Idol. She did well on her audition and later traveled to Argentina, where she was amongst the top performers of a Latin American Idol workshop. Her next challenge was to earn the most votes out of the 12 performers on the show. For two months, she was very successful and went all the way up to the final between her and Eduardo Aguirre of Costa Rica, where she performed with Franco de Vita. On December 10, 2009, after receiving more than 50% of the total number of votes, Martha Heredia became the new Latin American Idol.

== Post-Latin American Idol work ==
Heredia released her first single Música in January 2010 and was supposed to record her first studio album with Sony BMG, .

In 2013, Heredia was arrested while boarding a plane for the US and was charged with smuggling heroin. In 2014 she was convicted and sentenced to seven years in prison. In 2018 she was given a "part-time" release.

| Preceded by Margarita Henríquez | Latin American Idol; 2009 | Succeeded by The contest ceased to exist |
