= John Paul Ospina =

- John Paul Ospina in concert with Da Goske at the Puro Gold event, Colombiamoda 2006.

Background information
- Birth name: John Paul Ospina Morales
- Born: 2 September 1980 (age 44); Vancouver, British Columbia, Canada
- Origin: Medellín, Antioquia, Colombia
- Genres: Electronica; rock; pop; Latin
- Occupations: Singer; songwriter; music producer; TV host; actor
- Instrument: Vocals

John Paul Ospina Morales (born 2 September 1980 in Vancouver, British Columbia, Canada), is a Colombian singer, songwriter, producer, actor and TV host. He is well known for his participation on Latin American Idol (Season 1), aired by Sony Entertainment Television Latin America, and for hosting the Latin version of E! News for E! Entertainment Television Latin America.

== Biography ==
=== Early years ===
Ospina, was born in Vancouver, British Columbia, Canada, of Colombian heritage. His music grew influenced by Anglo and Hispanic sounds, taking in various musical genres such as Pop, Pop rock, RnB, Hip hop, Rap, Jazz and Salsa.

He studied Classical Singing at Antioquia University (la Universidad de Antioquia) and concurrently became the frontman for the pop rock band, El Sótano gaining recognition as part of the musical community in Medellín.

=== Career ===
==== Television ====
In 2003, Ospina decided to move to Bogotá; once there, he caught the eye of acting coach and teacher Victoria Hernández. Under her wing, he began studies in dramatic arts, obtaining the antagonist role on the 2004 international television series, " Al Ritmo de tu Corazón " (Canal RCN).

In 2005, he becomes the host of Citytv Bogotá’s Mucha Música, his country's most important music show at the time. As Much Music Colombia's main host, he gathered an important list of Latin and anglo musical interviewees. Also in 2005, he was invited by Fashion TV (FTV), to host an array of fashion specials, and to star in their shows "UOMO" and "Model Fan".

In 2006, after numerous auditions and televised tryouts which began with over 20.000 contestants from all Latin America, he became one of the top 10 finalists on Sony Entertainment Television Latin America's first season of Latin American Idol, reportedly transmitted for more than 24 countries and over 300.000.000 viewers. On June 11, 2007 John Paul makes his comeback to international TV as E! Entertainment Television Latin America's first male host sided by female entertainment host Daniela Kosán. Together, they co-host E! News for Latin America, 100% in Spanish, for over 14 million Hispanic speaking viewers. He has been the voice and image for companies' and fashion designers' ad campaigns in Colombia and abroad. John Paul was nominated as Best Male Model at the Cromos Fashion Awards, or Premios Cromos de la Moda, in 2004.

==== Music ====
Many of his songs, some of which were co-produced by Alejandro Restrepo (a.k.a. Patacón) and Camilo Soler, became part of the soundtrack for some of Colombia's television series such as "Francisco el Matemático". John Paul also sung the title song for the Latin version of "Peep and the Big Wide World" ("El Mundo Divertido de Peep"), on Discovery Kids. His career in electronic music began towards the end of 2005, when he became the lead singer of Da Goske, an electronic music project directed by Mario Jiménez (a.k.a. Rex), touring Colombia's main cities.Presently, he is working on the preproduction of his first commercial album, of electronic genre, where he will showcase his singer-songwriter and production abilities. Some of the collaborating artists on this album are: Carlos Iván Medina, Mario Jiménez (a.k.a. Rex) and Hernán López Sosa.
