= Margarita Henríquez =

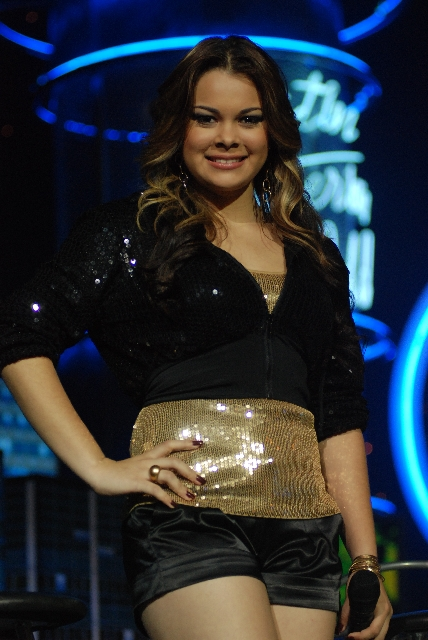

Background information
- Birth name: Margarita Esther Henríquez Rodríguez
- Born: April 17, 1991 (age 33)
- Origin: Panama
- Genres: Pop, Latin
- Occupation: Professional Singer
- Instrument: Vocals
- Years active: 2008-Present
- Labels: Sony BMG

Margarita Esther Henríquez Rodríguez (born April 17, 1991) is the winner of the third season of Latin American Idol, which she won on October 9, 2008.

== Biography ==
Henríquez became the youngest contestant to win and the third one since Carlos Peña. Henríquez beat the runner up María José Castillo for the title. She released her first album under the Sony BMG label on December 1, 2008. It has been very successful in Panama. It contains six songs that she performed during the TV Show. Her song "Vuela" has been successful on the Panamenian radio stations.

Preceded by Carlos Peña (singer)	Latin American Idol; 2008	Succeeded by Martha Heredia
