= María José Sevilla =

Spanish cook and writer (born 1949)

- Born: Madrid 1949
- Occupations: writer specialist in foods and wines
- Website: http://www.mariajosesevilla.com/

María José Sevilla (born Madrid 1949) is a Spanish cook and writer who is expert in Hispanic gastronomy and viticulture. She has developed her professional career in the United Kingdom where she has written a number of books as well as writing and presenting a television series.

== Career ==
Sevilla began very early in the world of gastronomy, moving to London where she has spent most of her professional life.

In 1989 she published the book "Life and Food in the Basque Country" describing her travels through the different areas of the Basque Country and how its inhabitants reflect their identity in their gastronomy. Other books followed, "Spain on a Plate: Spanish Regional Cookery"(1992) and "Mediterranean Flavours. Savouring the Sun" (1997)

For years she was head of the department "Foods and Wines from Spain", at the Institute of Foreign Trade of Spain (ICEX) in London, working as a market analyst and advising Spanish companies in the food sector interested in exporting or establishing themselves in the English market.

Sevilla has worked as a scriptwriter and presenter of gastronomic programmes on English television. In the year of the 1992 Barcelona Olympic Games, ICEX together with the BBC in London created a series of six episodes to introduce the English public to Spanish regional cuisine. The programme was called "Spain on a Plate" and the six episodes were written and presented by Maria José Sevilla. In addition to her activity in the United Kingdom, she has participated in activities and presentations in the United States, Australia, Canada, Japan. Her name appears on the list of visiting chefs at the Culinary Institute of America in Graystone, California.

In November 2019, she presented in London her first book published entirely in English: "Delicioso: A history of Food in Spain" in which she explores, from different perspectives, the varied historical influences of Spanish gastronomy. It delves into the historical context of Spanish food, as an amalgam of flavours, cultures and ingredients. The book has a hundred illustrations, most of them photographs.

She said in an EFE agency interview:

"I try to write about one of the things I like most about my country, history and food; how we like to relate to each other and how we use gastronomy as a social art. "Actually, Spanish cuisine, as such, does not exist. What exists are wonderful kitchens, with different names of the areas where they come from. Some are more complex, others more simple but all are part of our cultural legacy,"

This book is part of the "Foods and Nations" series, published by Reaction Books.

In 2019, she appeared in a db (drinks business) feature profiling the most influential women in the Spanish wine industry.

== Books ==
Life and Food in the Basque Country (Weidenfeld and Nicolson, 1989)

Spain on a Plate: Spanish Regional Cookery (1992)

Mediterranean Flavours. Savouring the Sun 1997, Publisher: Pavilion (1709)

Delicious: A history of Food in Spain. 2019. ISBN 978 1 78914 137 5.

Cocina de Andalucía (Ryland Peters & Small, 2024)

== Achievements ==
María José Sevilla is a member of the British Guild of Food Writers, and is a member of the Grand Order of Wine Knights (the highest recognition of experts in the field). She holds the Diploma of The Wine and Spirit Education Trust.., and won the Glenfiddich award in 1992.
