= Maria Martínez Abelló =

Spanish writer

Maria Martínez Abelló, known as Madama Abelló (died 1815), was a Spanish writer, dramatist, poet and salonnière.

She belonged to the group of literary women who kept literary salons and was published in Spanish papers between 1785 and 1805, when the Age of Enlightenment provided a greater public space for women in Spain.

Abelló was a noted host of a literary salon. She was a published poet in the Spanish press, and became noted for her play Entre los riesgos de amor sostenerse con honor, o La Laureta (1800), which was a rewrite of the "Laurette" (1761) by Jean-François Marmontel. Her work is considered notable in the history of feminism in Spain. She was a noted writer in her time and was included in contemporary dictionaries of famous women in 18th-century Spain.

== Selected works ==
- Entre los riesgos de amor sostenerse con honor, o La Laureta (1800).
- La Estuarda.
- Sentimientos obsequiosos de Madama Abelló, en aplauso del fúnebre canto, que compuso la hábil poetisa a su amado y difunto Pajarito (1799).

== Sources ==
- Franklin Lewis, Elizabeth (2004). Women Writers in the Spanish Enlightenment. The Pursuit of Happiness. Hampshire: Ashgate Publishing.
- http://dbd.cat/fitxa_biografies.php?id=509
- Fernández de Moratín, Leandro. «Catálogo de autores del siglo XVIII».
