= María Martínez Santillán =

Mexican politician

- Born: 8 July 1963 (age 62); Tziritzícuaro, Maravatío, Michoacán, Mexico
- Occupation: Deputy
- Political party: PT

María del Carmen Martínez Santillán (born 8 July 1963) is a Mexican politician affiliated with the Labor Party. As of 2013 she served as Deputy of the LXII Legislature of the Mexican Congress representing Michoacán.
