= Rosangela Abreu Crespo =

Puerto Rican singer (born 1983)

Rosangela
- Born: Rosangela Abreu Crespo; June 30, 1983 (age 43); Santo Domingo, Dominican Republic
- Genres: Pop, Latin, R&B
- Occupation: Singer
- Instrument: Vocals
- Years active: 2005–present

Rosangela Abreu Crespo (born June 30, 1983) is a Dominican-born Puerto Rican singer who participated as a contestant in the second season of Objetivo Fama, and the second season of Latin American Idol.

== Musical career ==
In 2005, Rosangela auditioned for a spot on the second season of the Puerto Rican reality/talent show Objetivo Fama. Rosangela reached the semi-finals before being eliminated.

Shortly after her departure from the show, Puerto Rican salsa singer, Gilberto Santa Rosa, approached Rosangela to record a duet with him. The song, titled "Hablando Claro", was featured in Santa Rosa's 2006 album, Directo al Corazón.

In 2007, Rosangela auditioned for the second season of Latin American Idol, another talent show competition. During the show, she was known for a powerful voice and a good stage presence. A wildcard pick on the show, she received favorable reviews of the judges and the celebrity coaches as well. She was the only female to make it into the Top 3 that season, but was voted off September 20, 2007.

== Songs performed in Latin American Idol ==
Latin American Idol season 2 performances and results
Episode	Theme	Song	Original artist	Order	Result
Top 30		"Quitame Este Hombre"	Pilar Montenegro		Saved by judges
Wildcard		"Sola Otra Vez"	Celine Dion		Judges' Pick
Top 12		"Lloviendo Estrellas"	Cristian Castro		Safe
Top 10		"Amor Total"	Emmanuel		Safe
Top 8		"Me Cuesta Tanto Olvidarte"	Mecano		Safe
Top 7		"El Poder de Tu Amor"	Ricardo Montaner		Safe
Top 6		"Así es la Vida"	Olga Tañon		Safe
Top 5		"El Reloj"	Luis Miguel		Bottom 3
Top 5		"Volver, Volver"	Ana Gabriel		Bottom 3
Top 4		"Ahora Que Te Vas"	La Quinta Estación		Safe
Top 4		"Entre Tu y Mil Mares"	Laura Pausini		Safe
Top 3		"A Puro Dolor"	Son By Four		Eliminated
Top 3		"Como Olvidar"	Olga Tañon		Eliminated
