= Monchi Balestra =

Argentine TV personality

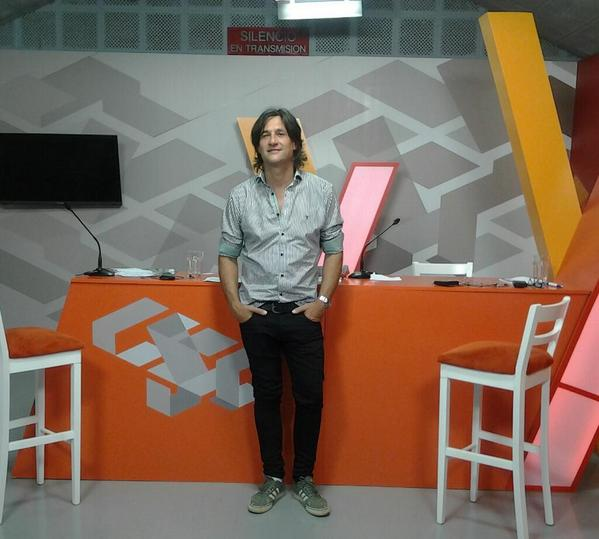
- Born: Ramón Marcelo Balestra; October 8, 1967 (age 58); Casilda, Santa Fe, Argentina
- Occupations: Television show host, television and radio personality
- Years active: 1980–present
- Spouse: Julieta Camaño (2003–2012)
- Children: 2

Ramón Marcelo Balestra (born October 8, 1967 in Casilda, Santa Fe), better known by his stage name Monchi Balestra, is an Argentine radio personality and television host.

== Life and career ==
=== 1967–2000: Early life ===
Ramón Marcelo Balestra was born on October 8, 1967, in Casilda, a city in the province of Santa Fe, Argentina. He's worked for several radio stations since he was thirteen. When he was eighteen he got his own radio station called FM TOP. At the age of 20 he went to California, United States, where he worked for many Latin radio stations. Then he came back to Santa Fe Province where he became a local celebrity. At this stage of his career he received his first nominations for Broadcasting and Martín Fierro Awards.

=== 2001–2011: Mainstream success ===
In 2001, Balestra hosted the new version of Azul TV's Versus. He also hosted Yo te avisé in 2002, Lo mejor de la semana from 2002–2003 and worked for the cable channels Fox Sports Latinoamérica and Movie City. In 2005, he was the host of the Argentine version of Family Feud called 100 argentinos dicen, broadcast by Canal 13. From 2006 to 2009, Balestra co-hosted Latin American Idol (the Latin American version of American Idol) with Erika de La Vega. On November 2, 2009 he came back as the host of the new game show Quinceañeras. The show was suddenly canceled on May 22, 2010.

=== 2012–present: Recent years ===
After a two-year hiatus, he came back as the host of Real o no Real, a TV show where Internet videos were shown in order to identify which were real and which were fake. It was shown on El Trece in 2012. In 2013 he went back to Santa Fe to be the host of Rejugados, a local game show. In 2013 he started hosting a radio show called En Acción. On 1 October 2014 this radio show began being shown on Canal 5 de Rosario.

== Credits ==
=== Television ===
Year	TV program	Channel	Notes
1994	Box music	Galavisión Rosario	Host
1995–1996	Va con vos	Canal 3 (Rosario)	Host
1997	Palo y palo	America 2	Reporter
2000–2001	TVI	Canal 5 de Rosario	Host
2001–2002	Versus	Azul TV	Host
2002	Yo te avisé	Canal 9	Host
2002–2003	Lo mejor de la semana	Canal 9	Host
2004	EX	Fox Sports Latinoamérica	Host
2004	Señal superpremium de cine para Latinoamérica	Movie City	Host
2004–2006, 2021	100 Argentinos Dicen	Canal 13	Host 2020-2021 He Was Replaced By Darío Barassi
2005	El salón internacional del automóvil	Canal 13	Host (Television Special)
2006–2008	Latin American Idol	Sony Entertainment Television	Host
2009	Un sol para los chicos	Canal 13	Host (Television Special)
2009–2010	Quinceañeras	Canal 13	Host
2011	Conectados 360	360 TV	Host
2012	Real o no Real	Canal 13	Host
2013	Rejugados	El Tres	Host
2014	En Acción	Canal 5 Rosario	Host

=== Radio ===
Year	Radio Show	Station	Notes
1995–1997	La tarde de la vida	FM Vida	Host
1998–2000	La maquina del sonido	FM Estación del Siglo 99.5	Host
1999	Delirantes	LT8 – AM 830	Host
2001	Vamos que venimos	Radio Show	Host
2005	A jugar	Radio del Plata	Host
2013 - 2014	En Acción	LT3 AM680	Host

== See also ==
- Latin American Idol
- List of Argentines
