= Carlos Peña (singer) =

Guatemalan singer and songwriter (born 1988)

- Born: Carlos Enrique Peña Aldana; January 9, 1988 (age 38)
- Origin: Guatemala City, Guatemala
- Genres: Pop, latin
- Occupations: Singer and songwriter
- Instruments: Vocals, guitar.
- Years active: 2007–present
- Label: Sony BMG

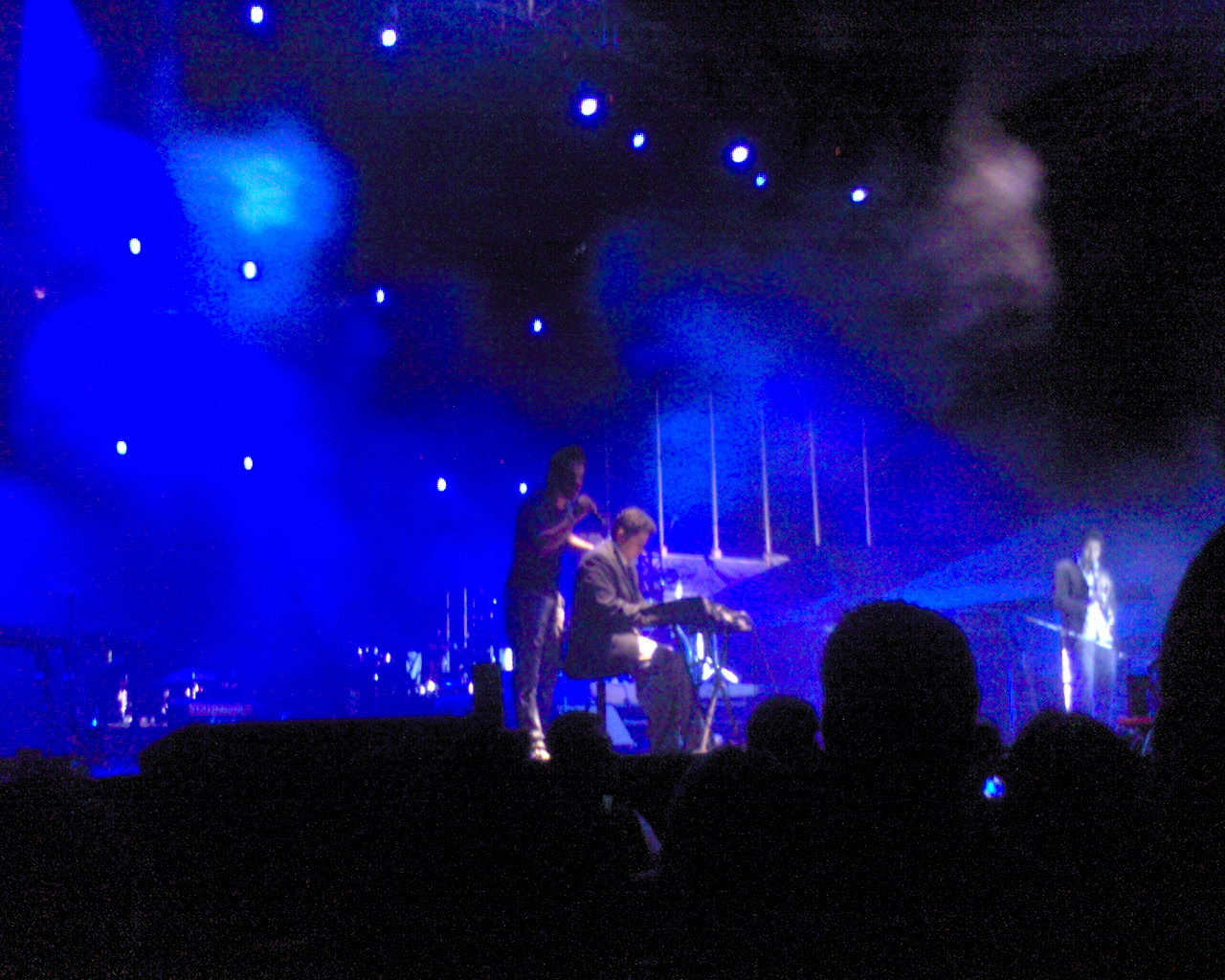
Carlos Peña performing at Movistar Music Fest, El Salvador. 2008

Carlos Enrique Peña Aldana (born January 9, 1988) is a Guatemalan singer and songwriter. He is the winner of the second season of Latin American Idol.

== Biography ==
Son of Hugo Peña and Nilsa Aldana de Peña. When he was young, he participated in tennis tournaments in Guatemala City, and joined the CSD Municipal's lower divisions football team. He was introduced to singing through his older brother Hugo (who lives in the USA), who took him to karaoke clubs in Los Angeles.

He participated in the first season of Latin American Idol (2006), but did not pass the theater round. During the second season of Latin American Idol, he competed in the final round of Latin American Idol against Ricardo Caballero from Mexico, singing 3 songs.

His first solo CD, called "Con una Canción," was released in December 2007 through Sony BMG It includes a song with the same title and other songs he performed in Latin American Idol; it was produced by the Mexican producer Fernando Chavez "Fech."

In 2010, he released the album Despierta, with his alternative rock band PENYA on the indie label The Sixth House/Mutual Sense Music. It was produced by his brother, Hugo Peña Jr.

== Activism and philanthropy ==
Carlos Peña is an activist against the children's Down Syndrome in Guatemala, and lends his celebrity to support a variety of causes for Guatemala.

== Awards and honors ==
He won the 2007 Latin American Idol competition.

His first album was certified double platinum in Central America.

In 2007, he received the honorific title of "Ambassador of the Peace" from the Guatemalan government.

He was invited to perform at one of the many Balls celebrating President Barack Obama’s Inauguration. He was originally scheduled to perform at the Urban Ball hosted by the American Music Inaguraual ball Committee, but when that got canceled he performed instead at the 2009 Red White & Blue USO Hero Ball, alongside George Clinton and Peter Paul & Mary. He was the only Central American performer invited to perform at one of the Inaugural Balls.

== Latin American Idol Performances/Results ==
Episode	Theme	Song choice	Original artist	Order #	Result
Audition	Auditioner's Choice	"Sería fácil"	Luis Fonsi	N/A	Advanced
Selection Process	Auditioner's Choice	Not Aired		N/A	Advanced
Selection Process	Auditioner's Choice	Not Aired		N/A	Advanced
Workshop No. 1	Contestant's Choice	"Tu Reputación"	Ricardo Arjona	8	Advanced
Top 12	Contestant's Choice	"Usted Se Me Llevo La Vida"	Alexandre Pires	10	Safe
Top 10	Emmanuel Homage	"Quiero Dormir Cansado"	Emmanuel	6	Safe
Top 8	Decade They Were Born	"Detalles"	Roberto Carlos	7	Safe
Top 7	Ricardo Montaner Homage	"Bésame"	Ricardo Montaner	7	Safe
Top 6	Latin Rhythm	"Fruta Fresca"	Carlos Vives	3	Safe
Top 5	Boleros and Rancheras	"La Media Vuelta"	José Alfredo Jiménez	4	Safe
Top 5	Boleros and Rancheras	"Ella"	José Alfredo Jiménez	9	Safe
Top 4	Love songs	"Contigo en la Distancia"	Luis Miguel	4	Safe
Top 4	Love songs	"Si Tú No Estas"	Rosana	8	Safe
Top 3	Hits Night	"Cuándo"	Ricardo Arjona	2	Safe
Top 3	Hits Night	"Corazón Partío"	Alejandro Sanz	5	Safe
Top 2	Finale	"Con una Canción"	Carlos Peña	1	Winner
Top 2	Finale	"Usted Se Me Llevó La Vida"	Alexandre Pires	3	Winner
Top 2	Finale	"Cada Palabra"	Carlos Peña	5	Winner

== Discography ==
- 2010: Despierta (with PENYA)
- 2009: Aquí estoy
- 2007: Con Una Canción

Preceded by Mayré Martínez	Latin American Idol; 2007	Succeeded by Margarita Henríquez
