= Maria José Gonzaga =

Portuguese politician and businesswoman (1946–2021)

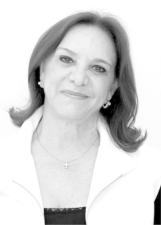

Mayor of Tatuí
- In office 1 January 2017 – 5 August 2021
- Preceded by: José Manoel Correa Coelho

Personal details
- Born: Maria José Pinto Vieira de Camargo; 10 June 1946; Angatuba, Brazil
- Died: 8 August 2021 (aged 75); São Paulo, Brazil
- Political party: PSDB

Maria José Gonzaga (10 June 1946 – 8 August 2021) was a Brazilian politician and businesswoman. A member of the Brazilian Social Democracy Party (PSDB), she served as the 37th Mayor of Tatuí from 2017 until her death in 2021. She was the second woman to serve as the city's mayor after Chiquinha Rodrigues did from 1945 to 1947. Elected the 37th mayor of Tatuí for the 2017-2020 term, she was elected in her first appearance as a candidate.

== Biography ==
Born in Angatuba, Maria José earned a degree in teaching and worked as a businesswoman for Grupo Santa Cruz for 40 years. She was President of Fundo Social de Solidariedade de Tatuí from 2005 to 2012. She was the wife of former Tatuí mayor and Legislative Assembly of São Paulo member Luiz Gonzaga Vieira de Camargo.

In 2016, Maria José ran for mayor of Tatuí as a member of the PSDB. She won in the first round, earning 51.38% of the vote and defeating incumbent mayor José Manoel Correa Coelho. Her candidacy had been challenged by Coelho, who raised concerns over her husband's appointment of a doctor who had been charged with malpractice.

Maria José Gonzaga died of abdominal cancer in São Paulo on 8 August 2021 at the age of 75.
