= María José (EP) =

EP by María José Castillo
- Released: November 26, 2008
- Recorded: 2008
- Genre: Pop
- Length: 21:03
- Label: Sony BMG Latin America
- Producer: Sebastian Mellino - Luis "Darta" Sarmiento

María José Castillo chronology
María José Castillo (2008)	María José (2008)

Singles from "María José"
- 1. "Abre Tu Corazón-(Sebastian Mellino - Luis "Darta" Sarmiento)" Released: November 25, 2008; 2. "Vuela -(Sebastian Mellino - Luis "Darta" Sarmiento)" Released: January 15, 2008

María José is an EP by María José Castillo, released in 2008 by Sony BMG Latin America. It has been certified Gold for selling +5,000 copies. It is often considered as only an EP because it only has six tracks and has not enough length to be an album. Sometimes it is considered as an album, although María José is an EP.

== Album information ==
Initially set for a December 2, 2008, release, the album was pushed up to November 28, 2008. María José was released on November 26 because of the finishing of the album earlier than expected. The album was originally set to be released only on Costa Rica and then making a major studio album and releasing it in more selected countries, but later it was released in various other countries. The album is mostly a cover album, covering four of her songs performed on Latin American Idol, but it has two tracks that were written for Castillo and her partner Margarita Henríquez. The album along with Henríquez album, has been successful on its home country, but it was failure internationally. But later on December the album got more promotion on other countries, and the sales got higher.

The album has been very successful for Sony BMG Latin America, on December 8, 2008, Sony BMG announced Castillo and the public that the album had sold 5,000 and got a Gold Certification.

== Track listing ==
No.	Title	Length
1.	"A Puro Dolor" (Cover from Son By Four)	3:31
2.	"A Quién Le Importa?" (Cover from Alaska y Dinarama)	3:55
3.	"Dame Un Beso" (Cover from Yuri)	3:03
4.	"Hijo De La Luna" (Cover from Mecano)	4:14
5.	"Abre Tu Corazón" (-(Sebastian Mellino - Luis "Darta" Sarmiento))	3:25
6.	"Vuela" (-(Sebastian Mellino - Luis "Darta" Sarmiento))	4:02

== Singles ==
- Abre Tu Corazón: It is the lead promotional single of the album. To date, it has been Castillo's most popular single. It made a peak and debut to number 3 on the Costa Rican main chart, making it the highest peak and debut on the chart by a Costa Rican artist. No music video was produced for the song, although only the radio release made the album get certified as gold, by selling +5,000 copies.
- Vuela: It is the second promotional single of the album. The song was not as successful as the album's lead single, although it had moderate success on Latin America, mainly on Costa Rica. It peaked at number 15 on the Costa Rican radio chart, although it didn't got to the main chart. No music video was produced and no CD single was released, only radio airplay.

== Chart performance ==
The album was a big success on Costa Rica. To date, the album has only charted on several minor charts in Costa Rica and also some mayor charts on the same country. The album was also released on other areas in Central America. Castillo said she would release a bigger album or production that would be released with promotional advertisements and music videos.

== Sales certification ==
Region	Certification	Sales
Costa Rica	Gold	+5,000

== Release history ==
Country	Date
Costa Rica	November 26, 2008
Nicaragua and Panamá	November 28, 2008
Colombia and Venezuela	November 30, 2008
Rest of Latin America	December 1, 2008
