= María José Martínez =

María José Martínez is the name of:

- María José Martínez Guerrero (born 1956), Spanish athlete and coach, suspect in the Operación Galgo
- María José Martínez Sánchez (born 1982), Spanish tennis player
- Maria José Martínez-Patiño (born 1961), Spanish athlete
