= Bárbara Muñoz (singer) =

Chilean R&B Singer and Songwriter (born 1985)

Bárbara Páz Muñoz Urzúa (Born June 13, 1985, Santiago, Chile) is a Chilean R&B Singer and Songwriter.

Bárbara Muñoz, born the second of three daughters began singing and performing at an amateur level at a very early age. Her father, a photographer was surprised by not only her photogenic qualities but her musical ear. By 12 years old she had learned word for word, English language standards by Earth Wind & Fire, Frank Sinatra, Whitney Houston, Stevie Wonder and others. By this time, she had also started to try her hand at songwriting, in both English & Spanish.

At 14 she was enrolled by her parents in formal voice training where she began to learn and develop skills and techniques to help advance her talent to a professional level. She began to win various festivals and talent competitions in Santiago.

== Early life and career beginnings (2002–2006) ==
In 2002 she was invited to perform in the television talent search "Nace una estrella" ("A Star is Born") on Santiago's Channel 13 where she won the singer's category. In 2004 she was invited to compete in the Televisión Nacional de Chile talent program Rojo where in the widely watched final episode she won the grand prize in the singing category for her interpretation of Caruso.

== Mexico (2006–2010) ==
In 2005 she independently released her CD Amanecer then traveled to Mexico to promote it and advance her career in a larger market. It was there where she was discovered by entertainment giant Sony BMG who signed her to a 4-album contract. In 2007 her CD Homónimo was released, featuring collaborations with Luis Fonsi, Mario Domm, Claudia Brant, Noel Schajris, and Leonel García from Sin Bandera with whom she also performed a duet on his own album.

== Hit International (2011—present) ==
Late in 2010 she decided to return to her native Chile to take time for reflection and plan the next phase of her career. Collaborating with Spanish Producer Juan Magan she released 2 singles: For a Night and Not the One both of which she wrote herself. In October, 2011 she performed for the first time in the United States at the Miami Beach 2011 Celebrate Orgullo Festival to a large and enthusiastic crowd.
