= Erika de la Vega =

Venezuelan television host

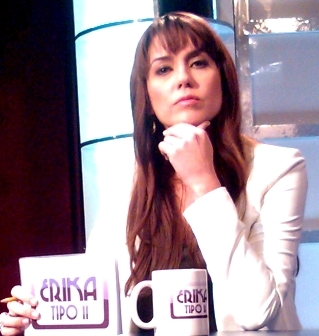
- de la Vega in 2012
- Born: Erika Patricia de la Vega Quesada; March 13, 1975 (age 51); Caracas, Venezuela
- Occupations: TV host, actress, comedian and announcer
- Spouse: Jesús Torres (2012–2022)
- Children: 1
- Website: www.erikatipoweb.com

Erika Patricia de la Vega Quesada (born March 13, 1975) is a Venezuelan television host, comedian, actress and announcer. She has a son named Matías Ignacio who was born as a result of her relationship with the musician, producer and businessman Jesús Torres, with whom she has been married since 2012.

== Filmography ==
=== Television ===
- Ya era hora (Telemundo) 2016
- Suelta la sopa (2014–2016)
- Yo Soy el Artista
- El show de Erika: Casi Late Night (Telemundo) 2014
- Gala Interactiva Miss Venezuela 2013 (Venevisión)
- Pepsi Venezuela Music Awards 2013 (Televen)
- Gala Interactiva Miss Venezuela 2012 (Venevisión)
- Erika Tipo 11 (Venevisión Plus)
- Latin American Idol (Sony Entertainment Television)
- Fama, Sudor y Lágrimas (RCTV)
- Diente por diente (RCTV)
- Ni tan tarde (Televen) (Puma TV)

=== Films ===
- 2010 – Toy Story 3 – Dolly
- 2011 – Er Conde Jones

=== Theatre ===
Erika de la Vega starred in a Spanish adaptation of Duncan Macmillan's Every Brilliant Thing at the Colony Theatre in 2018. The one woman show follows De la Vega's character through her life - from adolescence to adulthood - and her attempts to deal with her mother's deep depression.

The play ran at the Colony Theatre from June 22 - July 22, 2018, and had a second run from December 8–30, 2018.
