= María José Castillo =

- Born: María José Castillo Gutiérrez; August 11, 1990 (age 36); Heredia, Costa Rica
- Origin: Barva, Heredia, Costa Rica
- Genres: Pop
- Occupation: Singer
- Instrument: vocals
- Years active: 2007—present
- Labels: Sony BMG Latin America (2008–present)
- Website: Official Spanish Website

María José Castillo (born August 11, 1990) is a Costa Rican singer. She is best known for her participation in Latin American Idol. On the show she ended as the runner-up, losing to Margarita Henríquez. Her debut album, "María José", was released on November 25, 2008. The album was successful, debuting on the Costa Rican Top 10 albums on position 5. Its lead single, "Abre Tu Corazón", entered the Costa Rican Top 40 at position 3.

== Career ==
=== 2007–2008: Latin American Idol and debut EP ===
Castillo made her debut in the music business in the auditions for the third season of the show Latin American Idol in 2008. She was chosen to participate on the workshops to see if she was going to be chosen for the concerts. She was chosen on the third workshop and the later got to the top 10.

Castillo reached the finals with Margarita Henríquez. Castillo got as the runner-up on the show, but later it was revealed that she got the same prizes that the winner, Margarita Henríquez, won. She won a music contract with Sony BMG, a contract for publicity with Westwood Entertainment and an agent. Toyota Latin America gave her a car also. When she got back to Costa Rica after her participation on the show, the National University, gave her the chance to study any career she wanted and giving her therapy for her voice.

María José released her debut album later that year. The self-titled album entered the Top 10 Costa Rican albums. Also its lead single entered the Top 40 Costa Rican songs on the position 3, having one of the highest debuts of the year on that chart. The album was certified Gold by Sony BMG. The album's lead single, "Abre Tu Corazón", premiered on radio stations on November 10, 2008. On 2008, she was chosen as the leader for a Costa Rican festival called El Festival De La Luz (in English: The Light Festival). She was chosen by San José's mayor, Johnny Araya.

=== 2009 onward: First studio album ===
On the 40 Principlaes event, she performed the song "Para Siempre", which is set to be included on her upcoming album. To date it has been the only song confirmed to be on the album. Castillo said that the song is "one of her favorites". Castillo also said that she will have a "new look" and she said that she has plans to change her stage name to MaJo.

== Singles chronology ==
The following chart contains Castillo's singles to date, the year of release and the chart peak. The peak is on the Costa Rican Top 40 Chart, the main chart is Costa Rica.

Year	Song title	Peak
2008	"Abre Tu Corazón"	3
2009	"Vuela"	15

— (The single has not charted yet, or failed to chart)

== Television appearances ==
Year	Television Show	Notes
2007	Nace Una Estrella	A singing contest, first runner-up
2008	Latin American Idol	Singing contest, runner-up
2008	Bailando Por Un Sueño	Performed 2 songs
2008	Teletón 20–30, Panama 2008	Performed two duets with Margarita Henríquez and one song solo.
2008	El Festival De La Luz	Mariscal of the event
2008	El Chinamo	Performed 2 songs

== Discography ==
=== Studio albums and EPs ===
- 2008: María José (EP)
- 2009: Mi Destino
