= Efraín Medina =

Mexican singer (born 1979)

Efrain Medina
- Also known as: "Efras"
- Born: Efraín Medina Berry Vargas; May 25, 1979 (age 47)
- Origin: Pachuca, Hidalgo, Mexico
- Genres: Pop, Latin, R&B
- Occupations: Professional Singer, Administrator
- Instrument: Vocals
- Years active: 2005 - present
- Website: http://www.efrain-medina.com

Efraín Medina Berry Vargas (born May 25, 1979 in Pachuca, Hidalgo) is a Mexican singer who participated in and was among the final three contestants of the first season of Latin American Idol.

He is the oldest of four, with the younger siblings Lorena, Cristina and Alan. Since childhood he has liked music, specifically "ranchera", studying singing, solfeggio, piano, movement, scenic development, literary composition and acting. Vargas has said "I have always liked to sing very much, when I was a child I was always organizing festivals for my family or in the school, always I liked the music but I had not decided to dedicate myself professionally, it was just at my 18 years when I began with a performance in a restaurant in Pachuca, from that time, and to do a career, I had studied singing, acting, and when I felt prepared I did continue." He studied and graduated at the UNAM (National Autonomous University of Mexico) in the career of administration and did his specialization in marketing.

Vargas has recorded a CD "homemade but from the heart", interpreting rancheras songs. He also made his debut in musical theatre as Chris Perez (husband of the honoured one) in the musical Selena starring Lidia Ávila.
