= Ricardo Caballero Tostado =

Mexican singer

Ricardo Caballero
- Born: Ricardo Caballero Tostado; January 19, 1982 (age 43)
- Origin: Guadalajara, Mexico
- Genres: Pop, Latin
- Occupation: Singer
- Instrument: Vocals

Ricardo Caballero Tostado (born January 19, 1982) is a Mexican singer who was the runner-up of the second season of the singing competition series Latin American Idol. Ricardo is known as the "Caballero de Mexico".

Caballero was born in the city of Guadalajara in the state of Jalisco, located in western Mexico. He is the only son of Raul Caballero, a performer, and Georgina Tostado Orozco de Caballero, a fitness trainer; he has an older paternal half brother. Caballero began singing at bars and hotel lobbies at the age of 17. A year later, he began performing shows with his father. He continued performing in order to help pay for his studies at the Instituto Tecnologico y de Estudios Superiores de Occidente, or ITESO, at the Guadalajara campus, from which he graduated with a bachelor's degree in Marketing.

Ricardo has been the opening performer for concerts for international groups that include La Quinta Estación and Ha*Ash, among others. He has his own self-titled show, Ricardo Caballero; he is the singer and is accompanied by a band of five additional people. They have toured Mexico.

== Songs performed on Latin American Idol ==
1. Top 30: "La Fuerza del Corazón" (Alejandro Sanz) - First Workshop
2. Top 12: "Volver A Amar" (Cristian Castro) - First Concert
3. Top 10: "Detenedla Ya" (Emmanuel) - Second Concert
4. Top 8: "Santa Lucía" (Miguel Ríos) - Third Concert
5. Top 7: "La Cima del Cielo" (Ricardo Montaner) - Fourth Concert
6. Top 6: "Tragedia" (Marc Anthony) - Fifth Concert
7. Top 5: "Si Nos Dejan" (José Alfredo Jiménez) - Sixth Concert
8. Top 5: "El Viajero" (Luis Miguel) - Sixth Concert
9. Top 4: "Si Tu Supieras" (Alejandro Fernández) - Seventh Concert
10. Top 4: "¿Y Si Fuera Ella?" (Alejandro Sanz) - Seventh Concert
11. Top 3: "La Gota Fría" (Carlos Vives) - Eighth Concert
12. Top 3: "No Se Tú" (Armando Manzanero) - Eighth Concert
13. "Cada Palabra" (Written for the show) - Ninth Concert - Runner up (09/27/2007)
14. "La Fuerza del Corazón" (Alejandro Sanz) - Ninth Concert - Runner up (09/27/2007)
15. "Con una Canción" (Written for the show) - Ninth Concert - Runner up (09/27/2007)
