= Latin American Idol =

- Created by: Simon Fuller
- Starring: Erika de la Vega; Monchi Balestra; Jon Secada; Elizabeth Meza; Mimí; Gustavo Sánchez; Oscar Mediavilla
- No. of seasons: 4

Original release
- Network: SET
- Release: 12 July 2006 – 9 December 2009

Latin American Idol is the Hispanic American edition of the international Idols franchise. First airing in 2006, the series was the first in the franchise to extend beyond the borders of a single country, open to contestants from Mexico, Central, and South America. The show was filmed in Buenos Aires and was transmitted to over 23 nations in the region via the Sony Entertainment Television network.

== Premise ==
Latin American Idol was filmed in Buenos Aires, Argentina and aired throughout Latin America with the exception of Brazil, which has its own version called Ídolos Brazil, premiered in 2006. Portuguese-language contestants can participate if they are able to sing in Spanish. The show's hosts are the Venezuelan Erika de La Vega and Argentine Monchi Balestra. In the first season the judges panel was made up by Jon Secada from the United States (born in Cuba), Gustavo Sánchez from Puerto Rico and Elizabeth Meza from Mexico, the last of this being replaced since the second season by Mimi, a former member of musical group Flans, and Oscar Mediavilla from Argentina, replacing Gustavo Sánchez for the fourth season.

This show is divided into four phases: auditions, theater/secondary audition stage, workshops and performances.

=== Auditions ===
The first season's auditions took place in order in the cities of Caracas, Venezuela; Bogotá, Colombia; Mexico City, Mexico; and finally in Buenos Aires. Auditions took place between April–May, 2006. In the show's third season, Panama City, Panama was chosen as the fifth audition city, while in the fourth season San José, Costa Rica was chosen as an audition venue.

The stage of auditions was divided into two rounds:

- The pre-audition: Actually there are two pre-auditions. Before performing in front of the cameras and in front of the real panel of judges of the show, another panel of judges evaluate the auditioners to decide if they deserve to perform in front of the real panel of judges and in front of the television cameras. The panel of judges that make these pre-auditions choose auditioners that sing well and that have some chances to convince the real panel of judges, or, who sing bad and make a funny moment for the show.
- The audition: After the pre-audition, the panel of judges of the correspondent season (from time to time there is a guest judge to be part of the panel of judges) listen to the auditioners and say their opinions. Then each judge say "Yes" or "No" to the auditioners. The auditioners needs two out of three "Yes" in order to go to the Theater stage. If the auditioner is in front of four judges, three out of four "Yes" will be needed in order to go to the Theater stage. If there are four judges and the auditioner only gets two "Yes", they ask the auditioner to leave the place so that soon after the panel of judges decide if the auditioner should go or not to go to the Theater stage. To pass to this stage, the auditioners are invited to the next stage in Buenos Aires with the phrase "Welcome to Latin American Idol". Over 100 persons are the ones who are told this phrase and are invited to the Theater.

=== Theater/second stage of auditions ===
After performing for the panel of judges, successful contestants are invited to the next round of competition in Argentina.

==== Season 1 ====
The first season was different from the subsequent ones because this was divided just into two rounds.

The theater stage was divided into two rounds:

- Round 1: A performance in groups of three. The 100 contestants are split into groups of three's, according to gender. Sixty contestants are then selected to move on to the second round.
- Round 2: Solo performances. Each contestant is given four songs to perform, and the contestant selects one to perform. During stage of the competition, the panel of judges choose the top thirty contestants.

==== Seasons 2 and 3 ====
The theater stage is divided into three rounds, that will be explained in-depth each one.

- Round 1 - Auditions in lines: Approximately 100 contestants who got to the theater are split up in approximately 10 lines so that each one of the contestants performs again a cappella and with a microphone. Each contestant performs one by one. In the first season the contestants were split up in 3 groups, each group was put in a room, soon after, the panel of judges were going to each room to let the contestants know which of the three groups had made it to round 1. In seasons 2 and 3, after all the lines performed, the panel of judges call back each line and they call to the front to some contestants so that the line will be subdivided into two lines, then they say if the line at the front or the one at the back had made it, and which of them was cut out of the competition.
- Round 2 - Performances in groups: After the first stage, contestants are given a short break of some hours and then begins the second round. In the first season, it was the only in which this round was made in groups of three. They were split up by sex gender and there were groups of males and females. In the second season, contestants start grouping in couples (usually a male with a female) to sing in a duet. In the first and second season the panel of judges were choosing the contestants to sing in groups of two or of three. In the third season, in this stage, there were more females than males, thus, there was a kind of a party so that then can choose their partner. Females who didn't find a partner had to make a duo with another female. In this round they sing with music live. When finishing, each of the groups were being called and the panel of judges were saying if they had made it to the next stage.
- Round 3 - Performances in solo: After the first round, the panel of judges gives four songs to make contestants choose one of them, so that in the rest of the day and of the other day they prepare themselves memorizing the lyrics. This round is characterized because contestants usually forget the lyrics. They are also tired to practice because many of them should rehearse at night and don't sleep so well. All these factors affect the performance of many and they find it difficult to go to the next stage. The panel of judges say that it doesn't matter so much if contestants forget the lyrics, what they really matter is to label how they get back after being in a situation like that. When finishing this last round, the panel of judges organize the contestants into groups of five, in order to select the show's top thirty contestants.

==== Season 4 ====
The theater phase is renamed the "Second stage of auditions" during the fourth season.

- Round 1 – Auditions in lines: They are organized in lines of five people and each person with a microphone, sing a cappella, a song they choose (so that they can evaluate how well they know to choose their repertoire). The mechanism of selection is the same as in seasons 2 and 3: they call each line of auditioners, and tell some of the contestants to step forward so that they split up into 2 groups, then they say which line is the one who made it to the next round.
- Round 2 – Performances in solo: The judges give contestants four songs, so contestants have to choose one of them and they have all the rest of the day long and the early next day to try to memorize the lyrics. This round has a major difficulty, because of the time they have to prepare everything, not only to memorize the lyrics, but also to rehearse it and making it changes or everything necessary to give that song their own style, contestants usually forget the lyrics. In this round there was a particular case that a contestant, without knowing the results of that round, choose to give up. After all the auditions, the panel of judges call one by one to the contestants and tell them who are cut off and who goes to Buenos Aires, Argentina.

=== Workshops ===
==== Seasons 1, 2 and 3 ====
The thirty semi-finalists are split up into three groups of ten semi-finalists each one. The workshops consist of a small stage in which there is a small amount of public and each one of the semi-finalists perform in front of a live studio audience. During the workshops, each contestant performs in a platform, after talking about him or herself in previously recorded video. In the first season contestants performed accompanied by a pianist. During subsequent seasons, a live band performed with the contestant.

In this stage there are 4 workshops. In three of them the public vote is necessary and one special that is fully based on the judges decision. Each group of ten of the 30 semifinalists make one of three first workshops (Of which each contestant was put randomly). The last workshop is the Wild Card show, in which is performed the people who are saved from the judges in the workshops.

In a usual workshop, each one of the semi-finalists performs in a platform singing any kind of song in Spanish of any kind. Before the semi-finalist performs, a video takes place to let viewers get to know better each one of the semi-finalists. During the performance, a small advertisement is shown up with the name and last name of the contestants and below it will show the name we should text and the telephone number to which we have to send the text message to vote for that person. Generally, the name that we have to text is the first name of the semi-finalist, in such a case that two or more of the 30 semi-finalists have the same name, we will have to text the last name of each one to vote. In so special cases people will have to text the nickname in text messages to vote for the semi-finalists, but this is so strange to happen. After finishing the performance, the judges express their opinion about the performance. When the workshop finishes, the voting lines get open. The public starts voting and the next day the results show of each workshop takes place. In this results show, the public decision is revealed. The top three semi-finalists become finalists. After the Hispanic America's decision is revealed, the judges rescue two of the seven semi-finalists that were not chosen by the public to participate in the last workshop, the Wild Card.

Because there are three workshops, 9 semifinalists go to the finals with the public's help. Latin American Idol's normal format shows that there should be just 10 finalists (This has just been fulfilled in the first season). Two people who are rescued from each workshop make 6 semi-finalists totally to participate en the Wild Card, from which the panel of judges just choose one of them. In the second and third season, there has been an irregularity in Wild Cards, because in the third workshop of each season, the panel of judges rescued surprisingly one contestant more of each workshop to participate in Wild Card. In the Wild Card, the panel of judges chose three semi-finalists to make them become finalists. Because of this irregularity, the second and third season have had twelve finalists instead of just ten. The semi-finalists who achieve to become finalists, will always keep the same name to make people vote for them.

==== Season 4 ====
In the fourth season, the workshops decreased, instead of making four, there were just two. Because in the "second stage of elimination" there are 20 contestants chosen, of which 10 are male and 10 are female. Each Workshop is for one sex with the first workshop for males and the second one for females. In each workshop there are chosen the top five based on the public's vote. Also as expected, the panel of judges rescue contestants. In each workshop the panel of judges can choose one semi-finalist who has not received enough votes to become a finalist. Therefore, at the end of this stage, we find 12 finalists as in last season. It is important to point out that this new method is used so the male/female mix doesn't occur as happened in seasons 2 and 3. In the second season, males dominated the number of finalists (9 to 3) and in the third season, females dominated it (7 to 5). This season, as the first season, will have an equity around the finalists sex.

=== Concerts ===
During the first season, the number of contestants in the final stage (concerts' stage) was with 10 contestants, however, for the second season and the third season, because of the high quality of the finalists in these last ones, the panel of judges and production took the decision of increasing the number of people to the concerts to 12 finalists. In the fourth season it was assimilated that there would be 12 finalists.

According to the Latin American Idol's normal format this stage should be made in nine concerts. This has been fulfilled to the letter despite there have been more finalists than what was planned.

In the last stage, the panel of judges have no persuasion in the elimination of contestants. Everything that is worthing for elimination is the public's vote, the panel of judges just express their opinions in the performances.

The final stage is divided into nine concerts. Each concert has two episodes: one for performances and the other one for the results show. In each day of the performances of the concert, each finalist performs a song chosen by him/herself depending on the corresponding theme in each concert. Just after finishing the performances the voting starts, so Hispanic America has approximately 15 hours to vote for their favorite contestant. When starts the results show the next day the voting is ended and one or more finalist is eliminated. Because there have been more finalists of what was expected in the last three seasons, the production has had to fit the first concerts. In the second and fourth season, two finalists were eliminated in the first two concerts. In the third season three finalists were eliminated in the first concert. Each concert has a theme, and each one of the finalists should perform with a song according to the theme. While the finalist performs there will appear the name of the finalist and below the instructions of how to vote for the finalist. In Argentina and Uruguay is kept the number 35355 (In the workshops, people had to vote to this same number). In the rest of Hispanic America people have to text to 43657 (IDOLS) and in Puerto Rico because of being a territory of the United States is obtained a special number, 55225. At the middle of this stage when several finalists have been eliminated, in the sixth concert, with the last five finalists; the finalists will have to perform with two songs per concert until the semifinal (eighth concert), which usually has no theme. When there are the three last finalists, who are considered semi-finalists of the concerts' stage (In the third season there was an irregularity with this kind of semi-finalists because there were four of them because in the antepenultimate concert any contestant was eliminated, subsequently this irregularity was sorted out by eliminating two contestants in the semi-final). These four semi-finalists of the concerts' stage, just after the results show of the seventh concert finishes, are sent with a group of the production of Latin American Idol to their respective countries. There the production record everything the finalists do in their countries, besides sending with them to the singer mentors to prepare them for the semi-final concert. In the semi-final concert, the finalists sing two songs and as regularly one is eliminated or in such a case of the third season two are eliminated. The two ones remaining, become finalists of the concerts' stage. And one of them will be the winner of the season.

The final concert of Latin American Idol is the ninth concert and is different from the previous ones. Because there are just two finalists, each one has to sing three songs. The last concert has no theme. The show's production write two songs fully unpublished so that the finalists sing them in this concert. In the first round of this concert a finalist sing an unpublished song and the other finalist sing the other song. In the second round each finalist sing their best performance during all their way for Latin American Idol. In the third round each finalist sing the unpublished song that didn't sing in the first round. The results show of this last concert is called the great final because in this one is decided who is the new Latin American Idol. The great final is the largest episode of the season because the auditions and the two parts of the theater last one hour on air. The results show last a half-hour, but the great final lasts two hours and is the last episode that is completely live in air. In the great final perform the finalists of the season, and there is a great quantity of guest celebrities. When finishing the show it is decided who the winner is based on the publics' vote and gets a contract with Sony BMG.

== Synopsis of the seasons ==
- Finalists (With dates of elimination)
- Season 1 (2006)
Mayré Martínez	Winner
Noelia Soto	26 October
Efraín Medina	19 October
Gabriel Suárez	12 October
Hernán López	5 October
Andrea del Valle Bela	28 September
John Paul Ospina	21 September
Isa Mosquera	14 September
Lilia Mariñelarena	7 September
Denis Smith	31 August
- Season 2 (2007)
Carlos Peña	Winner
Ricardo Caballero	27 September
Rosangela Abreu Crespo	20 September
Arquimedes Reyes	13 September
Silvia de Freitas	6 September
Francisco Pérez	30 August
Saúl Alvidrez	23 August
Emiliano Sansone	16 August
Samantha Byars	9 August
Juan Pablo Villacorta	9 August
Emiliano Roque	2 August
Julián Rubio	2 August
- Season 3 (2008)
Margarita Henríquez	Winner
María José Castillo	9 October
Sandra Muente	2 October
Pako Madrid	2 October
Manuel Arauz	18 September
José Manuel Espinoza	11 September
Nicole Pillman	4 September
Manuel Salas	28 August
Raquel Bustamante	21 August
Francisca Silva	14 August
Anne Lorain Lanier	14 August
Jesús Pardo	14 August
- Season 4 (2009)
Martha Heredia	Winner
Eduardo Aguirre	10 December
Rubén Álvarez	3 December
Sara Bellomo	26 November
Fernando Lara	19 November
Lady Balarezo	12 November
Rolando Lopez	5 November
Tania Meyer	29 October
Johan Estrada	22 October
Osvaldo Conde	22 October
Paula Rodriguez	15 October
Sol Vargas	15 October

=== First season ===
The first season of Latin American Idol premiered on 12 July 2004. Its official sponsor was Movistar. There were 4 auditions: Mexico City, Mexico; Bogotá, Colombia; Caracas, Venezuela and the host country, Argentina in its capital Buenos Aires. The hosts were: Erika De la Vega and Monchi Balestra. The judges were: Jon Secada, Gustavo Sánchez and Elizabeth Meza. Before starting the judges of American Idol; Simon Cowell, Randy Jackson and Paula Abdul performed in Sony Entertainment Television a video saying that there was coming a Hispanic American version of the show.

The theater of this stage is unique making a comparison with the other seasons because this one was divided into 2 stages instead of three. On 2 August, the making of the First Workshop was made, were the finalists were chosen: Gabriel Suárez, Lilia Mariñelarena and Mayré Martínez. On 9 August 2007, the second workshop, in which the ones who went to the next stage were Isa Mosquera, Dennis Smith and Andrea del Valle. On 17 August, the last threesome of finalists chosen was revealed: Efraín Medina, Hernán López and Noelia Soto. Of each one of the workshops, two contestants were saved, who made it to the group of the last workshop that was known as The last opportunity. The saved contestant in this last workshop was John Paul Ospina, who joined the other nine contestants thanks to the help the panel of judges gave him to be part of group of the finalists. John Paul Ospina turned into the first Wild Card of Latin American Idol and also is the only one in getting the workshop of the last chance without surprises of choosing more finalists.

In the next stage it was made what was called "galas" in which each contestant sang a song and were voted by the public, the 3 contestants with the fewest votes were called to the "Bottom 3" and one of them was eliminated, while the other ones were mentioned randomly. In the second stage they were calling a "Bottom 2", it means 2 contestants with the fewest votes, and each contestant sang two songs per concert. After the two stages of the galas it was got to the semifinal membered by Mayré Martínez from Venezuela, Noelia Soto from Argentina and Efraín Medina from Mexico, resulting eliminated the Mexican contestant, which made finalists to the Venezuelan Mayré Martínez and the Argentinian Noelia Soto, at the end of the season, each finalist sang three (3) themes, two unpublished and their favorite sang in the competition, the voting was spread out to twenty-four (24) hours, having the Venezuelan Mayré Martínez, winner of the competition, and the only contestant who wasn't proposed to be eliminated. In declarations subsequent to the final, the judge Gustavo Sánchez announced that Mayré had received 76.5% of the total votes.

=== Second season ===
In the second season, the Mexican judge Elizabeth Meza left the competition giving place to Irma Angélica "Mimí" Hernández, another Mexican judge. Movistar returned as a sponsor its support to the show. The auditions kept same way (Bogotá, Colombia; Mexico City, Mexico; Caracas, Venezuela and Buenos Aires, Argentina) ad the contestants, Venezuelan Erika De la Vega and Argentinian Monchi Balestra. Rules changed so that people under 18 years old could participate, the competition came down to 16 years old. The competition also increased the ages from 28 to 30 years old.

The theater changed radically compared to the first season, instead of two rounds, it was developed in three rounds: auditions in lines, duets and solo performances. The judged gave some songs to make contestants choose what they want to sing in their duets and solo performances. The panel of judges grouped in the duets rounds each contestant. When the theater round finished, the Hispanic America's top 30 was chosen.

The three workshops was started by the Hispanic American public voting. And were chosen 9 out of the 10 finalists that were planned to be chosen, in the first three workshops. In these, the two first finalists from CentroAmerica were chosen in the competition; Carlos Peña from Guatemala and Arquímedes Reyes from El Salvador. Also the panel of judges chose the first finalists under age of the competition, Francisco Pérez from Colombia and Emiliano Sansone from Argentina. For the first time in the competition, the judges just chose one female contestant of the three first workshops, Silvia de Freitas from Venezuela. In the third workshop many were taken surprisingly because the judges and the production improvised and decided to save more people and three finalists more were chosen in the Wildcard show instead of just one. Which made 12 finalists. In this workshop the first finalist from Caribe, Rosángela Abreu from Puerto Rico made it to the finals. In this workshop made it to the next stage two female and one male, leaving nine male finalists and three female finalists.

When the 12 finalists were selected, the concerts' stage started. In the first and second concert 2 contestants with the fewest votes were eliminated, since the third show just one contestant was being eliminated, all this is because this stage should be made just in nice concerts. Incredibly the Argentinian contestants who had 4 representatives among the finalists were eliminated quickly: two in the first concert, one in the second and the last one in the third. In the semifinal there were Rosangela Abreu Crespo, Ricardo Caballero and Carlos Peña. In the final show, after a great musical show and the exceptional performance of the two finalists, it was revealed that Carlos Peña from Guatemala was the winner, it's important to mention that Peña was the only contestant who was about to be eliminated, because he was never in any bottom.. This season was characterized by the intention of the production of the show to penetrate more in the Mexican market.
