= Víctor Manuelle discography =

This page lists all of Víctor Manuelle's album and singles, including information such as record sales and chart positions. He has sold over 2 million copies in United States and over 6 million copies worldwide.

== Albums ==
=== Studio albums ===
Title	Album details	Peak chart positions					Certifications
Title	Album details	US	US Latin	US Trop	US Heat	US Hol	Certifications
Justo a Tiempo	Released: June 1, 1993; Labels: Sony Discos; Formats:	—	—	—	—	—	
Sólo Contigo	Released: September 13, 1994; Label: Sony Discos; Formats:	—	—	—	—	—	
Víctor Manuelle	Released: January 23, 1996; Labels: Sony Discos; Formats:	—	42	8	—	—	RIAA: 2× Platinum (Latin)
A Pesar de Todo	Released: June 3, 1997; Label: Sony Discos; Formats:	—	9	2	50	—	RIAA: 2× Platinum (Latin)
Ironias	Released: May 12, 1998; Labels: Sony Discos; Formats:	—	4	1	12	—	
Inconfundible	Released: September 28, 1999; Label: Sony Discos, Columbia Records; Formats:	96	2	1	—	—	RIAA: 2× Platinum (Latin)
Instinto y Deseo	Released: January 30, 2001; Labels: Sony Discos; Formats:	197	1	1	—	—	RIAA: Platinum (Latin)
Le Preguntaba a la Luna	Released: October 29, 2002; Label: Sony Discos; Formats:	—	12	1	—	—	
Travesia	Released: March 2, 2004; Labels: Sony Norte; Formats:	177	1	1	—	—	RIAA: Platinum (Latin)
Decisión Unánime	Released: May 9, 2006; Label: Sony BMG Norte; Formats:	140	6	1	—	—	RIAA: Platinum (Latin)
Navidad a Mi Estilo	Released: November 6, 2007; Labels: Machete Music; Formats:	184	7	2	—	42	
Soy	Released: June 10, 2008; Label: Kiyavi Corp. - Sony BMG Norte; Formats:	159	9	1	—	—	
Yo Mismo	Released: November 10, 2009; Labels: Kiyavi Corp.; Formats:	110	3	1	—	—	
Busco un Pueblo	Released: November 24, 2011; Label: Sony Music Latin, Kiyavi Corp.; Formats:	158	4	2	—	—	RIAA: Gold (Latin)
Me Llamaré Tuyo	Released: June 25, 2013; Labels: Sony Music Latin, Kiyavi Corp.; Formats:	—	3	2	—	—	
Que Suenen los Tambores	Released: April 25, 2015; Label: Sony Music Latin, Kiyavi Corp.; Formats:	167	2	1	—	—	RIAA: Gold (Latin)
25/7	Released: March 23, 2018; Label: Sony Music Latin, Kiyavi Corp.; Formats:	—	2	1	—	—	RIAA: Gold (Latin)
Memorias de Navidad	Released: October 25, 2019; Label: Sony Music Latin; Formats:	—	9	2	—	30	
Lado A Lado B	Released: April 28, 2022; Label: Sony Music Latin; Formats:	—	—	13	—	—	

=== Live albums ===
Title	Album details	Peak chart positions	
Title	Album details	US Latin	US Trop
En Vivo Desde el Carnegie Hall	Released: March 1, 2005; Labels: Sony BMG Norte; Formats:	12	4
Dos Soneros... Una Historia (with Gilberto Santa Rosa)	Released: November 22, 2005; Labels: Sony BMG Norte; Formats:	18	1

=== Compilation albums ===
Title	Album details	Peak chart positions	Certifications
Title	Album details	US Trop	Certifications
Éxitos de Víctor Manuelle	Released: August 1, 2000; Labels: Sony Discos; Formats:	—	
Víctor Manuelle (box set)	Released: December 11, 2001; Labels: Sony Discos; Formats:	—	
Historia de un Sonero	Released: October 7, 2008; Labels: Sony BMG, Sony Music Latin; Formats:	1	RIAA: Gold (Latin)
Muy Personal	Released: 2009; Labels: Kiyavi Corp.; Formats:	—	
Mis Favoritas	Released: June 8, 2010; Labels: Sony Music Latin; Formats:	11	
Sólo para Mujeres	Released: August 5, 2014; Labels: Sony Music Latin; Formats:	12	
Leyendas: Salsa Romántica (with Jerry Rivera and Luis Enrique)	Released: November 4, 2014; Labels: Sony Music Latin, CBS; Formats:	17	
Sonero de la Juventud... Salsero Original	Released: August 12, 2016; Labels: Sony Music Latin; Formats:	6	

== Singles ==
Year	Title	Chart positions			from the Album
Year	Title	Top Latin Songs	Latin Tropical Airplay	Latin Pop Airplay	from the Album
1993	Estás Tocando Fuego	27	-	-	Justo a Tiempo...
1993	Me Dará el Consentimiento	21	-	-	Justo a Tiempo...
1994	Apiádate de Mi	16	3	-	Sólo Contigo
1995	Por Ejemplo	-	10	-	Sólo Contigo
1996	Hay Que Poner el Alma	6	1	-	Víctor Manuelle
1996	Todo Quedó, Quedó	-	10	-	Víctor Manuelle
1996	Pensamiento y Palabra	17	2	18	Víctor Manuelle
1996	Volverás	17	1	12	Víctor Manuelle
1997	Como Una Estrella	29	4	13	Víctor Manuelle
1997	Dile a Ella	9	1	5	A Pesar de Todo
1997	He Tratado	9	1	12	A Pesar de Todo
1998	Así es la Mujer	7	1	16	A Pesar de Todo
1998	El Águila	10	2	11	A Pesar de Todo
1998	Se Me Rompe el Alma	3	1	5	Ironías
1998	Que Habría Sido de Mí	5	1	11	Ironías
1999	Qué Te Han Dicho	35	-	16	Ironías
1999	Al Igual Que Yo	28	39	9	Ironías
1999	Pero Dile	3	1	11	Inconfundible
2000	Si la Ves	20	5	25	Inconfundible
2000	Como Duele	11	3	20	Inconfundible
2000	Como Quisiera Decirte	-	35	-	Inconfundible
2001	Me Da lo Mismo	5	1	18	Instinto y Deseo
2001	Cómo Se lo Explico al Corazón	13	1	32	Instinto y Deseo
2001	Quisiera Inventar	-	13	-	Instinto y Deseo
2002	En Nombre de los Dos	14	1	34	Le Preguntaba a la Luna
2003	El Tonto Que No Te Olvidó	22	1	36	Le Preguntaba a la Luna
2003	Poco Hombre	37	3	-	Le Preguntaba a la Luna
2004	Tengo Ganas	1	1	11	Travesía
2004	Lloré, Lloré	21	2	38	Travesía
2004	Te Propongo	-	6	-	Travesía
2005	La Vida Es Un Carnaval	-	38	-	Victor Manuelle en Vivo: Desde el Carnegie Hall
2005	Dos Soneros, Una Historia (featuring Gilberto Santa Rosa)	-	14	-	Dos Soneros, una Historia
2006	Nuestro Amor Se Ha Vuelto Ayer (featuring Yuridia)	8	1	7	Decisión Unánime
2006	Maldita Suerte (featuring Sin Bandera)	17	7	8	Decisión Unánime
2007	Nunca Habia Llorado Así (featuring Don Omar)	47	1	-	Decisión Unánime
2007	Si Nos Duele	19	2	30	Live from Madison Square
2007	Yo Traigo la Parranda	-	16	-	Una Navidad a Mi Estilo
2008	Yo No Sé Perdonarte	14	1	13	Soy
2008	No Soy Quién	43	9	40	Soy
2009	Daría Mi Vida Por Ella	-	31	-	single only
2009	Dime	-	10	-	Soy
2009	Yo Confío en Ti	-	-	33	Muy Personal
2009	Mírame	41	1	35	Yo Mismo
2010	Lo Que Me Hiciste (featuring Jorge Celedón)	-	37	-	Yo Mismo
2010	Canto A Puerto Rico	-	-	-	Single Only
2011	Si Tú Me Besas	1	1	1	Busco Un Pueblo
2012	Ella Lo Que Quiere Es Salsa (featuring Julio Voltio and Jowell & Randy)	29	1	33	Busco Un Pueblo
2012	Me Llamaré Tuyo	-	1	-	Me Llamaré Tuyo
2013	Ando Por Las Nubes	-	4	-	Me Llamaré Tuyo
2014	Una Vez Más (featuring Reik)	-	-	-	Me Llamaré Tuyo Reloaded
2014	Que Suenen Los Tambores (Pa'l Mundo)	-	-	-	Que Suenen Los Tambores
2014	Que Suenen Los Tambores	-	-	-	Que Suenen Los Tambores
2015	Agua Bendita	-	-	-	Que Suenen Los Tambores
2015	Algo Le Pasa A Mi Héroe	-	-	-	Que Suenen Los Tambores

== Guest singles ==
Year	Title	Chart positions			from the Album
Year	Title	Top Latin Songs	Latin Tropical Airplay	Latin Pop Airplay	from the Album
1998	"El Cuerpo Me Pide" (Elvis Crespo & Victor Manuelle)	4	1	5	Tarjeta de Navidad, Vol. 2
1999	"La Persona Equivocada" (Melina León featuring Victor Manuelle)	13	8	4	Con los Pies Sobra la Tierra
2002	"Por Ese Hombre" (Brenda K. Starr featuring Victor Manuelle and Tito Nieves)	11	1	33	Temptation
2003	Ay Amor (Héctor & Tito featuring Victor Manuelle)	-	5	-	La Historia Live
2004	No Hay Cama Pa' Tanta Gente	36	26	13	Single only
2006	No Hay Nadie (Héctor Delgado featuring Victor Manuelle and Yomo)	15	13	-	Gold Star Music Reggaeton Hits
2006	Evitaré (N'Klabe featuring Victor Manuelle)	-	8	-	I Love Salsa!
2007	La Mujer Que Más Te Duele (Isaac Delgado featuring Victor Manuelle)	-	3	-	En Primera Plana
