= List of Billboard Tropical Airplay number ones of 1996 =

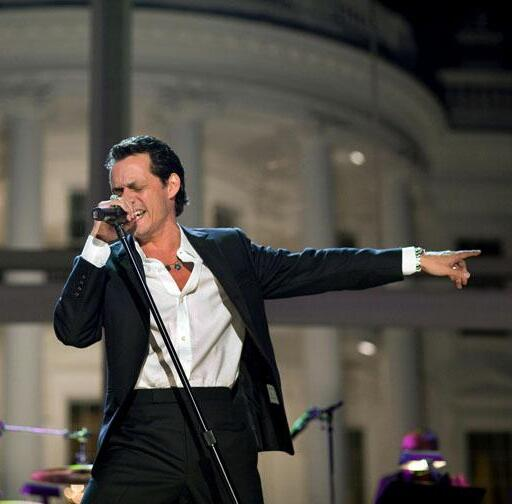
Marc Anthony had the most number one songs of 1996 with five.

Tropical Airplay is a chart that ranks the top-performing songs (regardless of genre or language) on tropical radio stations in the United States, published by Billboard magazine based on weekly airplay data compiled by Nielsen's Broadcast Data Systems. It is a subchart of Hot Latin Songs, which lists the best-performing Spanish-language songs in the country. In 1996, 20 songs topped the chart, in 52 issues of the magazine.

The first number one of the year was "Nadie Como Ella" by Marc Anthony, which had been in the top spot since the issue dated December 23, 1995, and spent a total of three weeks at this position. Marc Anthony was also the artist with most number ones in 1996 with five songs. Víctor Manuelle and Jerry Rivera achieved their first chart-toppers in 1996 and each had two number ones in the year. "Loco de Amor" by Rivera held this position for seven weeks and tied with Frankie Ruiz's song "Ironía" for the longest run at number one. The latter song was named the best-performing track of the year on the Tropical Airplay chart and won the Billboard Latin Music Award for "Tropical/Salsa Hot Latin Track of the Year" in 1997.

Dark Latin Groove, a salsa and hip hop fusion concept by American musician Sergio George, released their self-titled album in 1996. The album's first two singles, "No Morirá" and "Todo Mi Corazón", both reached number one on the Tropical Airplay chart. Gilberto Santa Rosa topped the chart for the first time in 1996 with "No Quiero Na' Regala'o", which was also the final number one of the year. Jessica Cristina (credited as Jessica), Domingo Quiñones, and Tony Vega obtained their first and only chart-toppers in the year. Cristina was the only female artist to have a number one on the Tropical Airplay chart in 1996.

== Chart history ==
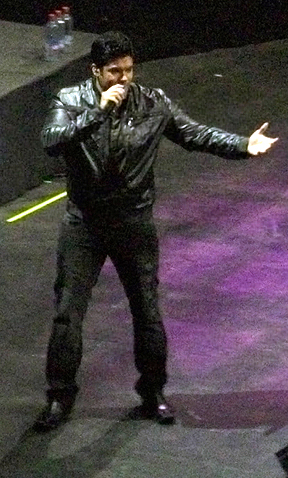
"Loco de Amor" by Jerry Rivera (pictured) tied with "Ironía" by Frankie Ruiz as the longest-running number one song of 1996.

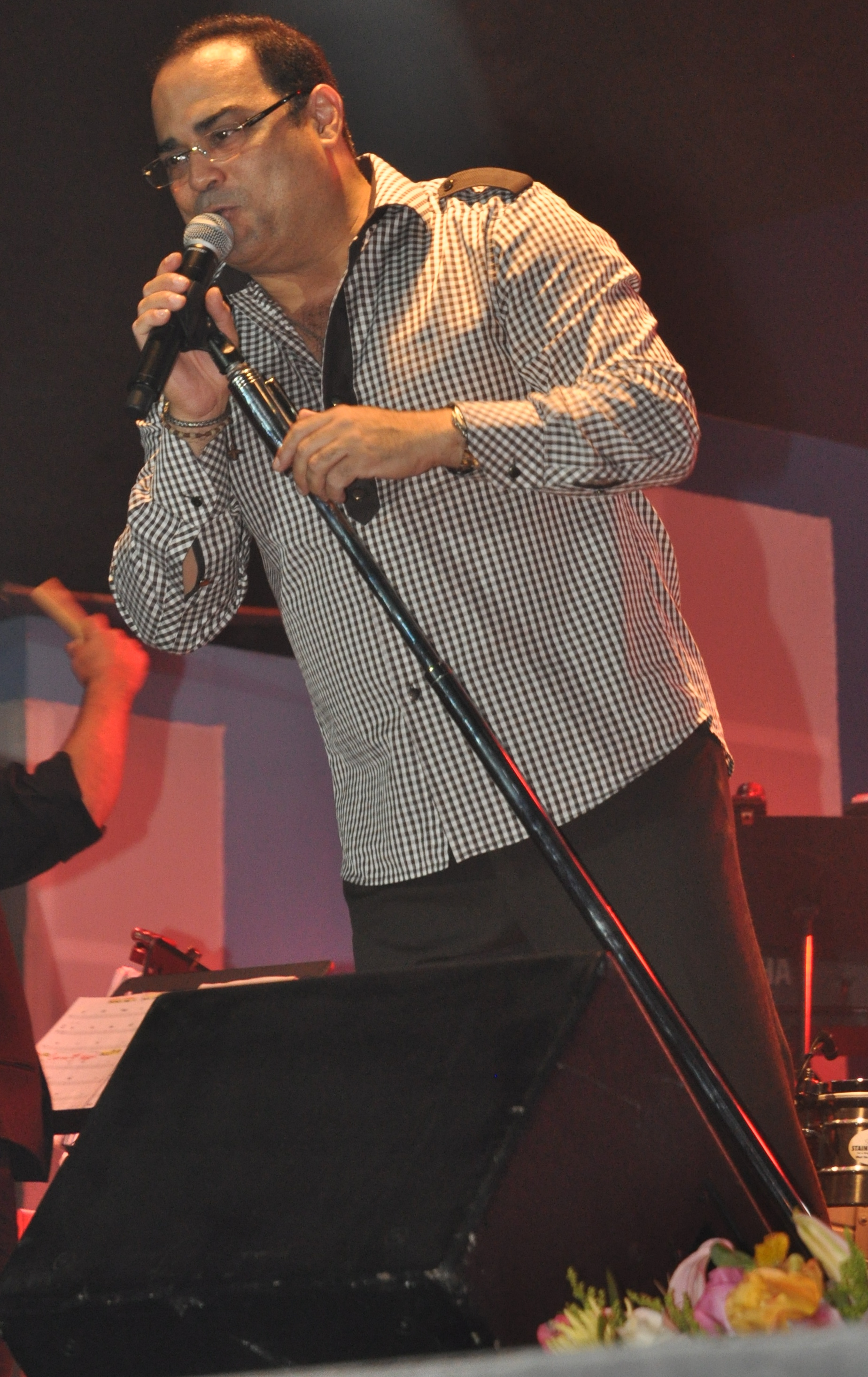
Gilberto Santa Rosa had the final number one of the year with his first chart-topper.

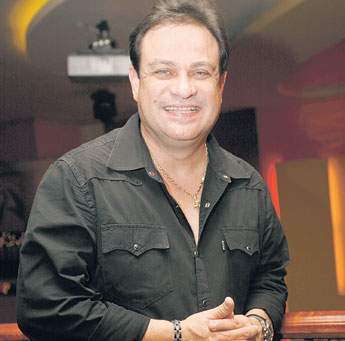
Tony Vega achieved his only number one in 1996 with "Esperaré a Que Te Decidas".

Chart history
Issue date	Title	Artist(s)	Ref.
January 6	"Nadie Como Ella"	Marc Anthony	
January 13	"Suave"	Jerry Rivera	
January 20	"Suave"	Jerry Rivera	
January 27	"Mi Forma de Sentir"	Giro	
February 3	"Mi Forma de Sentir"	Giro	
February 10	"Te Amaré"	Marc Anthony	
February 17	"Te Amaré"	Marc Anthony	
February 24	"Te Amaré"	Marc Anthony	
March 2	"Hay Que Poner el Alma"	Víctor Manuelle	
March 9	"Hay Que Poner el Alma"	Víctor Manuelle	
March 16	"Hay Que Poner el Alma"	Víctor Manuelle	
March 23	"Hay Que Poner el Alma"	Víctor Manuelle	
March 30	"Hay Que Poner el Alma"	Víctor Manuelle	
April 6	"Hay Que Poner el Alma"	Víctor Manuelle	
April 13	"Tú Cómo Estás"	Domingo Quiñones	
April 20	"Tú Cómo Estás"	Domingo Quiñones	
April 27	"Llegaste a Mi"	Marc Anthony	
May 4	"Llegaste a Mi"	Marc Anthony	
May 11	"No Morirá"	Dark Latin Groove	
May 18	"No Morirá"	Dark Latin Groove	
May 25	"No Morirá"	Dark Latin Groove	
June 1	"Esperaré a Que Te Decidas"	Tony Vega	
June 8	"Esperaré a Que Te Decidas"	Tony Vega	
June 15	"Esperaré a Que Te Decidas"	Tony Vega	
June 22	"Ironía" †	Frankie Ruiz	
June 29	"Todo Mi Corazón"	Dark Latin Groove	
July 6	"Ironía" †	Frankie Ruiz	
July 13	"Ironía" †	Frankie Ruiz	
July 20	"Ironía" †	Frankie Ruiz	
July 27	"Ironía" †	Frankie Ruiz	
August 3	"Ironía" †	Frankie Ruiz	
August 10	"Ironía" †	Frankie Ruiz	
August 17	"Hasta Ayer"	Marc Anthony	
August 24	"Hasta Ayer"	Marc Anthony	
August 31	"Hasta Ayer"	Marc Anthony	
September 7	"Loco de Amor"	Jerry Rivera	
September 14	"Loco de Amor"	Jerry Rivera	
September 21	"Loco de Amor"	Jerry Rivera	
September 28	"Loco de Amor"	Jerry Rivera	
October 5	"Loco de Amor"	Jerry Rivera	
October 12	"Loco de Amor"	Jerry Rivera	
October 19	"Miénteme Otra Vez"	Rey Ruiz	
October 26	"Loco de Amor"	Jerry Rivera	
November 2	"Por Amar Se Da Todo"	Marc Anthony	
November 9	"Te Felicito"	Jessica	
November 16	"Te Felicito"	Jessica	
November 23	"Y Sé Que Vas a Llorar"	Manny Manuel	
November 30	"Te Felicito"	Jessica	
December 7	"Volverás"	Víctor Manuelle	
December 14	"Una y Mil Veces"	Jerry Rivera	
December 21	"No Quiero Na' Regala'o"	Gilberto Santa Rosa	
December 28	"No Quiero Na' Regala'o"	Gilberto Santa Rosa	

== See also ==
- 1996 in Latin music
