= Lo Nuestro Award for Tropical Female Artist of the Year =

Latin music award

- Awarded for: Tropical Salsa Female Artist of the Year
- Country: United States
- Presented by: Univision
- First award: 1993
- Currently held by: Olga Tañón (2016)
- Website: univision.com/premiolonuestro

The Lo Nuestro Award for Tropical Salsa Female Artist of the Year (or Tropical Female Artist of the Year) is an honor presented annually by American network Univision. The Lo Nuestro Awards were first awarded in 1989 and has been given annually since to recognize the most talented performers of Latin music. The nominees and winners were originally selected by a voting poll conducted among program directors of Spanish-language radio stations in the United States and also based on chart performance on Billboard Latin music charts, with the results being tabulated and certified by the accounting firm Deloitte. At the present time, the winners are selected by the audience through an online survey. The trophy awarded is shaped in the form of a treble clef. This category originally was awarded as Tropical Salsa Artist of the Year (1989-1992), and from 1993 onwards was separated as Female Artist of the Year and Male Artist of the Year.

The award was first presented to Dominican singer Angela Carrasco in 1993. Puerto-Rican American performer Olga Tañón holds the record for the most awards with 13, out of seventeen nominations. Tañón also has become the most awarded in Lo Nuestro Awards history, with 25 accolades. Cuban singers Celia Cruz and Gloria Estefan, awarded three and two times, respectively, are the only multiple winners beside Tañón. Puerto-Rican singer India is the most nominated performer without a win, with 12 unsuccessful nominations.

== Winners and nominees ==
Listed below are the winners of the award and the nominees for each year.

Key	Meaning
‡	Indicates the winner

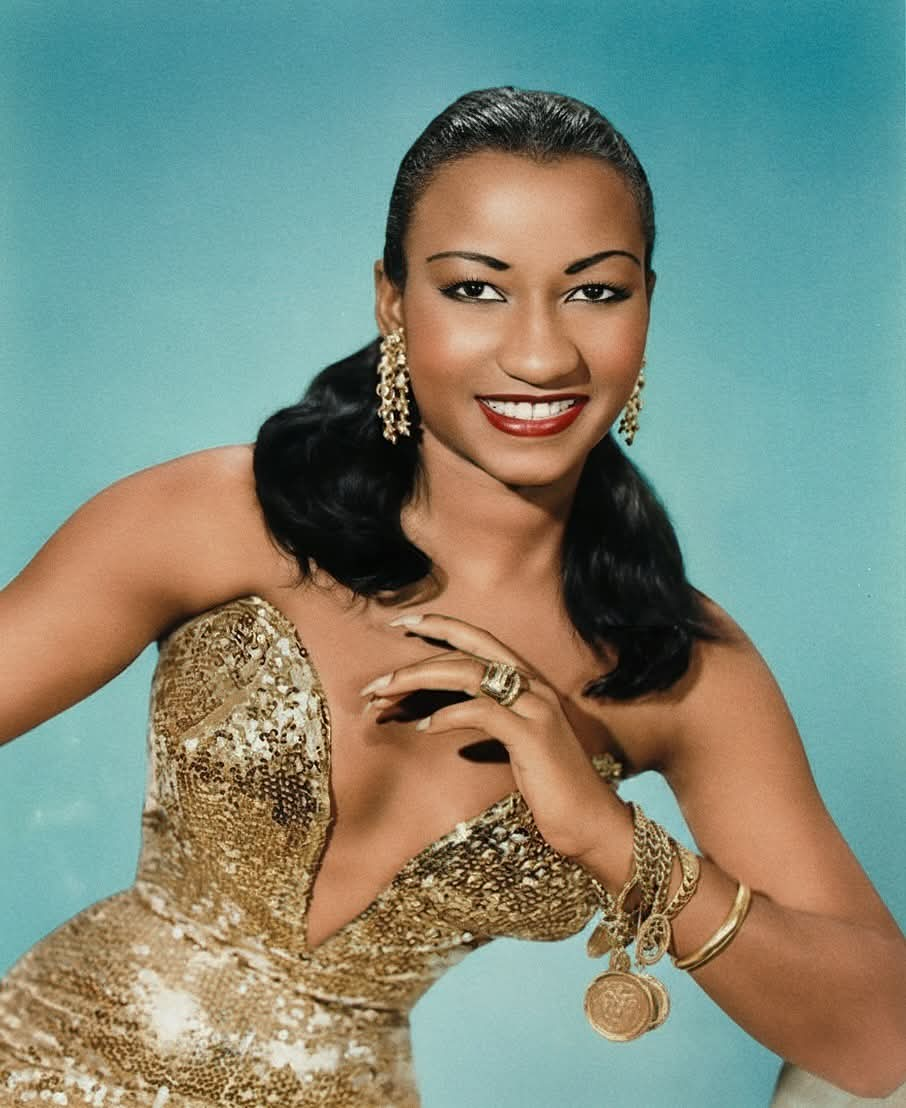
Cuban-American singer Celia Cruz (pictured in 1957), three-time winner and five-time nominee

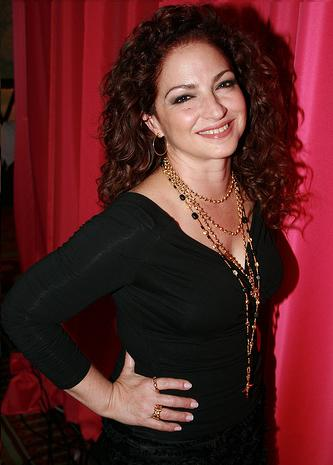
Cuban-American performer Gloria Estefan (pictured in 2009), two-time winner out of seven nominations

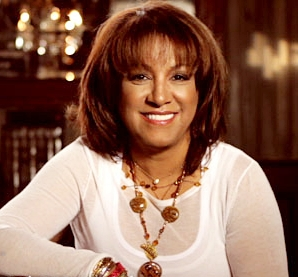
Dominican singer Milly Quezada (pictured in 2011), eight-time nominee

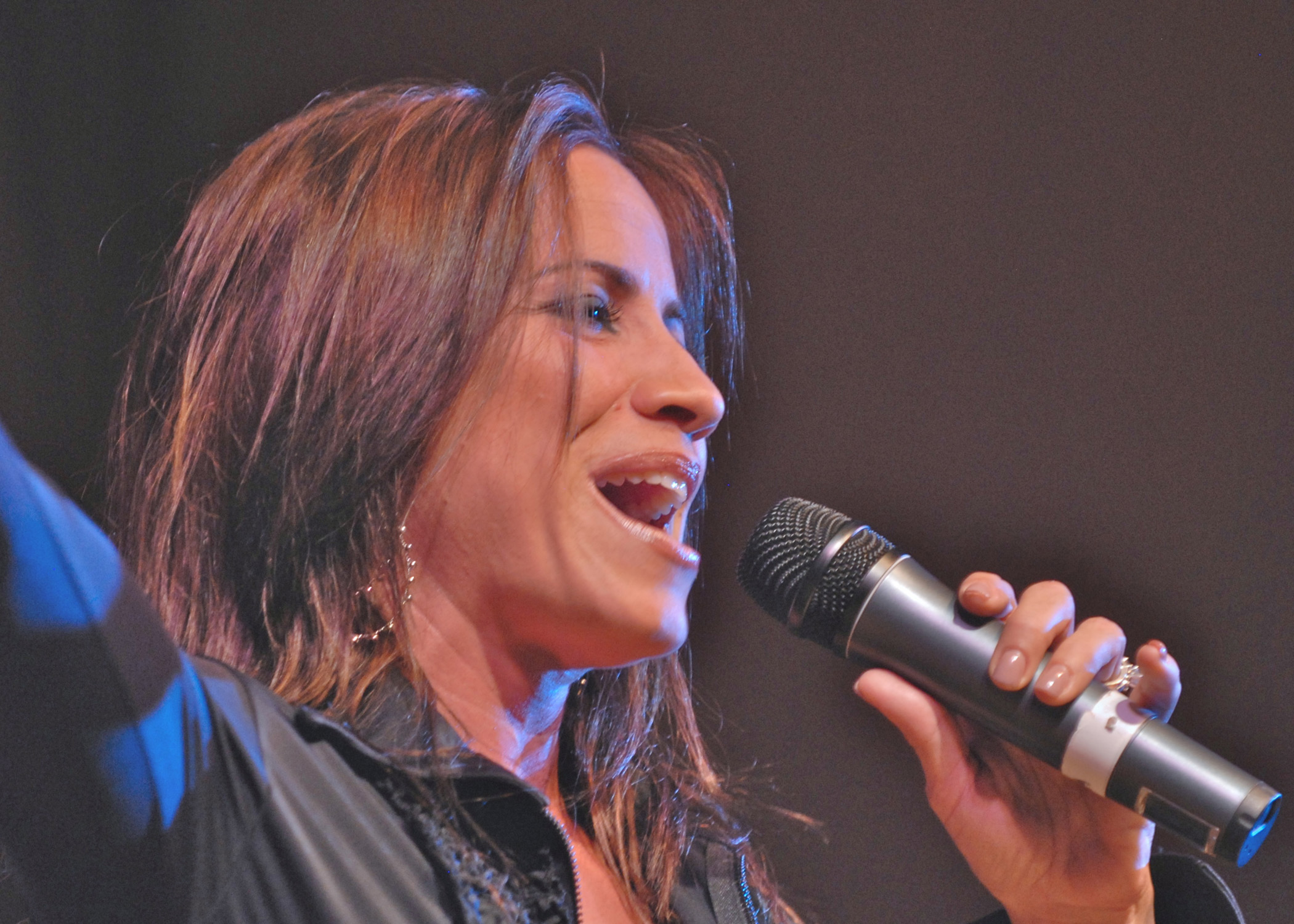
Puerto-Rican American singer Melina León (pictured in 2007), winner in 2010

Year	Performer	Ref
1993 (5th)	Angela Carrasco‡	
1993 (5th)	India	
1993 (5th)	Linda Ronstadt	
1993 (5th)	Olga Tañón	
1994 (6th)	Gloria Estefan‡	
1994 (6th)	Celia Cruz	
1994 (6th)	Linda Ronstadt	
1994 (6th)	Olga Tañón	
1995 (7th)	Olga Tañón‡	
1995 (7th)	Celia Cruz	
1995 (7th)	Gloria Estefan	
1995 (7th)	India	
1996 (8th)	Gloria Estefan‡	
1996 (8th)	Jailene Cintrón	
1996 (8th)	India	
1996 (8th)	Olga Tañón	
1997 (9th)	Jailene Cintrón‡	
1997 (9th)	Brenda K. Starr	
1997 (9th)	Gisselle	
1997 (9th)	Jessica	
1998 (10th)	Olga Tañón‡	
1998 (10th)	Albita	
1998 (10th)	Jailene Cintrón	
1998 (10th)	India	
1999 (11th)	Olga Tañón‡	
1999 (11th)	Gisselle	
1999 (11th)	India	
1999 (11th)	Milly Quezada	
2000 (12th)	Olga Tañón‡	
2000 (12th)	Gisselle	
2000 (12th)	India	
2000 (12th)	Milly Quezada	
2001 (13th)	Gisselle‡	
2001 (13th)	Celia Cruz	
2001 (13th)	Gloria Estefan	
2001 (13th)	Milly Quezada	
2002 (14th)	Olga Tañón‡	
2002 (14th)	Carolina la O	
2002 (14th)	Melina León	
2002 (14th)	Milly Quezada	
2003 (15th)	Celia Cruz‡	
2003 (15th)	Susana Baca	
2003 (15th)	Brenda K. Starr	
2003 (15th)	Milly Quezada	
2004 (16th)	Celia Cruz‡	
2004 (16th)	India	
2004 (16th)	Olga Tañón	
2004 (16th)	Sophy	
2005 (17th)	Celia Cruz‡	
2005 (17th)	Gloria Estefan	
2005 (17th)	India	
2005 (17th)	Melina León	
2006 (18th)	Olga Tañón‡	
2006 (18th)	Brenda K. Starr	
2006 (18th)	Melina León	
2006 (18th)	Milly Quezada	
2007 (19th)	Olga Tañón‡	
2007 (19th)	Gisselle	
2007 (19th)	India	
2007 (19th)	Milly Quezada	
2008 (20th)	Olga Tañón‡	
2008 (20th)	Gloria Estefan	
2008 (20th)	Fanny Lú	
2008 (20th)	India	
2009 (21st)	Olga Tañón‡	
2009 (21st)	Gloria Estefan	
2009 (21st)	Fanny Lú	
2009 (21st)	Milly Quezada	
2010 (22nd)	Melina León‡	
2010 (22nd)	Carolina la O	
2010 (22nd)	Marala	
2011 (23rd)	Olga Tañón‡	
2011 (23rd)	Alexandra	
2011 (23rd)	India	
2011 (23rd)	Carolina la O	
2011 (23rd)	Margarita "La Diosa de la Cumbia"	
2012 (24th)	Olga Tañón‡	
2012 (24th)	India	
2012 (24th)	Santaye	
2012 (24th)	Sohanny	
2013 (25th)	Olga Tañón‡	
2013 (25th)	Ámbar	
2013 (25th)	Fanny Lú	
2013 (25th)	Leslie Grace	
2014 (26th)	Olga Tañón	
2014 (26th)	Ámbar	
2014 (26th)	Fanny Lú	
2014 (26th)	Leslie Grace	
2014 (26th)	Gretchen	

== See also ==
- List of music awards honoring women
