= Loco de Amor (Jerry Rivera song) =

1996 song by Jerry Rivera

Single by Jerry Rivera

from the album Fresco
- Released: 1996
- Studio: Charlie Dos Santos; E1212 Recording; Genesis Recording; Ocho Recording; Power Light Recording; Sir Sound Recording, NY; V, .U. Recording
- Genre: Salsa
- Length: 4:40
- Label: Sony Discos
- Songwriter: Mary Lauret
- Producers: Sergio George; Cuto Soto

Jerry Rivera singles chronology
"Suave" (1995)	"Loco de Amor" (1996)	"Una y Mil Veces" (1996)

"Loco de Amor" (Crazy of Love) is a song by Puerto Rican singer Jerry Rivera from his seventh studio album Fresco, (1996). The song was written by Mary Lauret and produced by Sergio George and Cuto Soto. It is a salsa tune, in which Rivera confesses that he is crazy in love. The song received positive from music critics, being identified by them as a standout from the album. It was nominated for the Tropical Song of the Year award at the 9th Annual Lo Nuestro Awards in 1997 and was a recipient of the ASCAP Latin Award in the tropical field in the same year. In the United States, "Loco de Amor" reached number 11 on the Billboard Hot Latin Songs chart and topped the Tropical Airplay chart, spending eight weeks at this position on the latter chart. A music video for the song was filmed in a barn.

== Background and composition ==
In 1996, Rivera released his seventh studio album Fresco. It is a traditional salsa album produced by Sergio George and Cuto Soto with the lyrics of the songs having a ballad-laden "romantic touch". The album's songs were written by composers who are popular in the Latin music field including Rudy Pérez, Manny Benito, Alejandro Vennazi, and Mary Lauret, the latter of whom composed "Loco de Amor". Musically "Loco de Amor" is a salsa song in which Rivera sings in the chorus: "Vuelve por favor, mira que estoy loco de amor y ya no puedo resistir ni un dia mas lejos de ti". (Note: In English translation: "Please come back, see that I'm crazy in love and I can't resist another day away from you.")

== Promotion and reception ==
"Loco de Amor" was released as the lead single from Fresco in 1996. A music video was filmed for the song which the features scenes of the singer and a woman in a barn. Writing for Vista, Lili Estefan praised the track as "a contagious song that will shake up all the salsa record charts". José A. Estévez Jr. of AllMusic called the track one of the album's stand outs while Billboard editor John Lannert cited it as one of the songs where Rivera "sounds more emotive than ever" despite being "limited in range and depth". Cashbox music critic Héctor Résendez regarded the song as "undisputedly Sergio George at his usual creative peak".

The track was nominated in the category of Tropical Song of the Year at the 9th Annual Lo Nuestro Awards in 1997, ultimately losing to "La Morena" by Ilegales. It was recognized as recognized as one of the best-performing songs of the year at the 1997 ASCAP Latin Awards on the tropical field. In the United States, "Loco de Amor" reached number 11 on the Billboard Hot Latin Songs chart and topped the Tropical Airplay chart, where it spent eight weeks on this spot. On the year-end chart, the song ended 1996 as the fifth best-performing song on the Tropical Airplay chart.

== Charts ==
=== Weekly charts ===
Chart performance for "Loco de Amor"
Chart (1996)	Peak position
US Hot Latin Songs (Billboard)	11
US Tropical Airplay (Billboard)	1

=== Year-end charts ===
1996 year-end chart performance for "Loco de Amor"
Chart (1996)	Position
US Tropical Airplay (Billboard)	5

== See also ==
- List of Billboard Tropical Airplay number ones of 1996
