= Premio Lo Nuestro 1997 =

Latin Music awards show

9th Lo Nuestro Awards
- Date: Thursday, May 8, 1997
- Site: James L. Knight Center; Miami, Florida, US

Highlights
- Most awards: Enrique Iglesias (3)
- Most nominations: Marco Antonio Solís and Shakira (5)

The 9th Lo Nuestro Awards ceremony, presented by Univision honoring the best Latin music of 1996 and 1997 took place on May 8, 1997, at a live presentation held at the James L. Knight Center in Miami, Florida. The ceremony was broadcast in United States and Latin America by Univision.

During the ceremony, nineteen categories were presented. Winners were announced at the live event and included Spanish singer Enrique Iglesias receiving three awards, and Colombian singer Shakira, Mexican group Límite, Dominican band Ilegales, each receiving two awards. Among its honors, Iglesias won the award for "Pop Album of the Year," Los Tigres del Norte earned the award for "Regional Mexican Album of the Year," and Marc Anthony won the award for "Tropical/Salsa Album of the Year." Mexican group Mariachi Vargas de Tecalitlán received the Excellence Award and a special tribute was given to singer-songwriter Juan Gabriel.

== Background ==
In 1989, the Lo Nuestro Awards were established by Univision, to recognize the most talented performers of Latin music. The nominees and winners were selected by a voting poll conducted among program directors of Spanish-language radio stations in the United States. The categories included are for the Pop, Tropical/Salsa, Regional Mexican and Music Video. The trophy awarded is shaped like a treble clef. The 9th Lo Nuestro Awards ceremony was held on May 8, 1997, in a live presentation held at the James L. Knight Center in Miami, Florida. The ceremony was broadcast in United States and Latin America by Univision.

== Winners and nominees ==
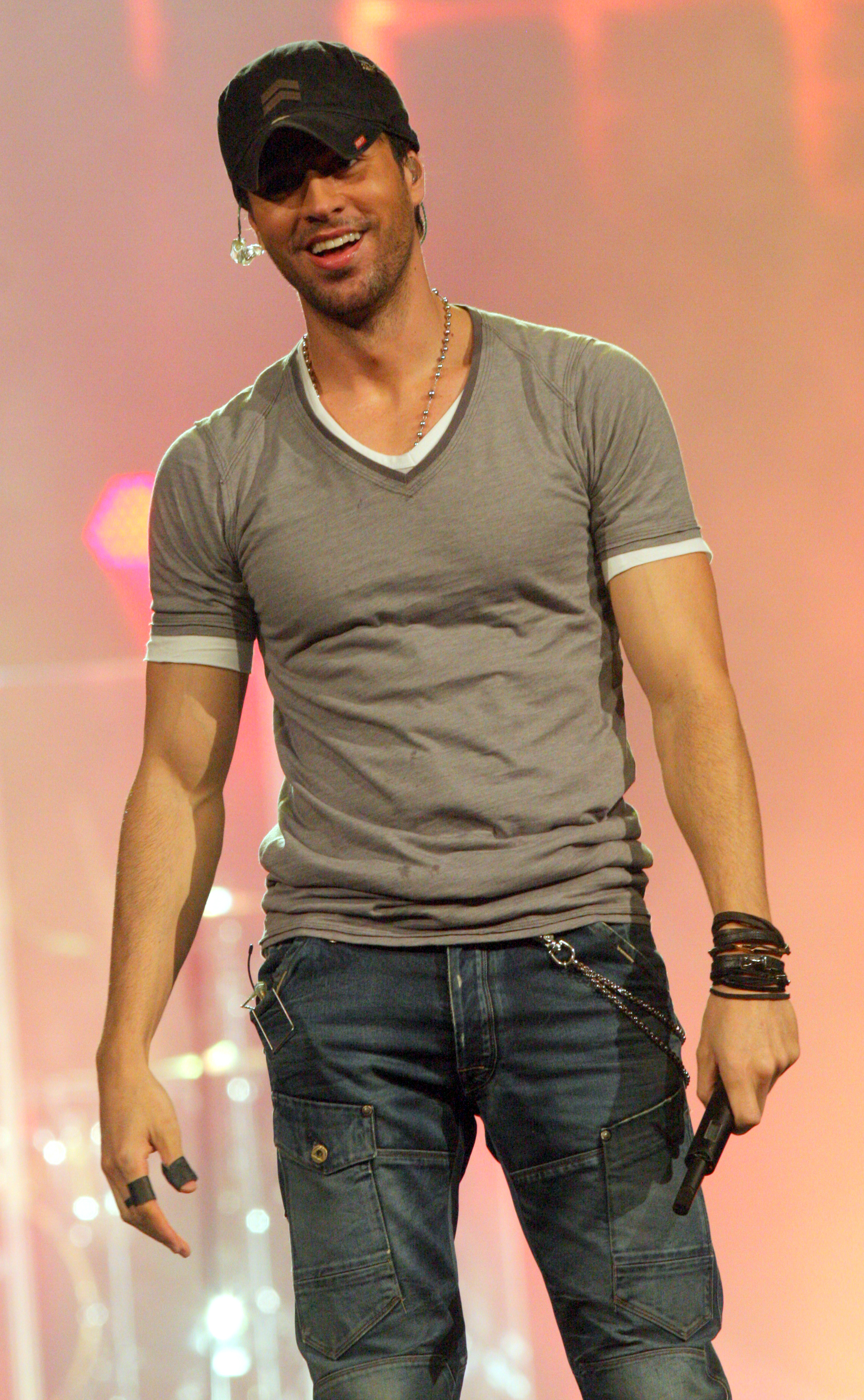
Enrique Iglesias won three Lo Nuestro Awards in 1997, including Pop Song of the Year for second year in a row.

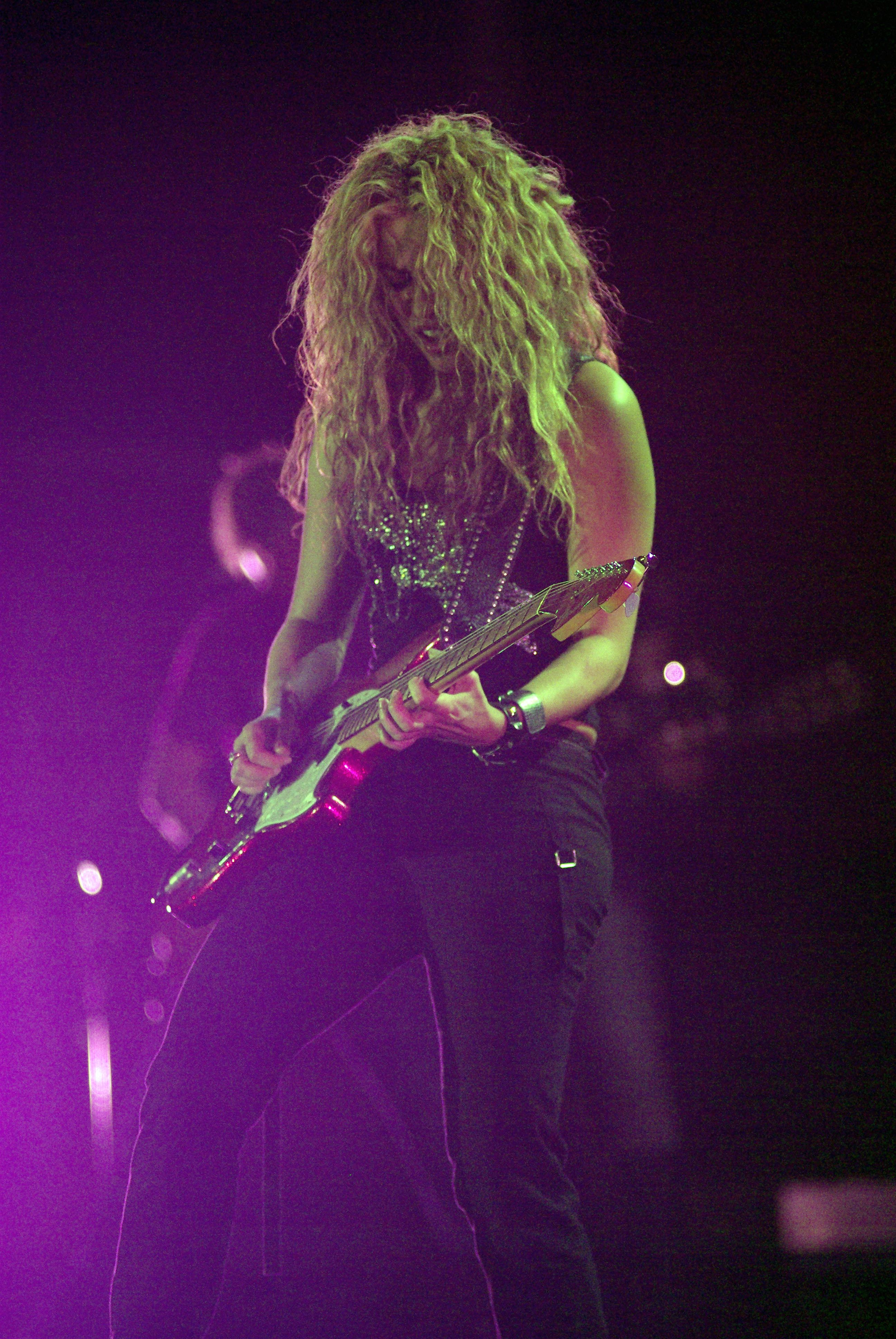
Shakira earned two awards at the show, and was nominated for Pop Album of the Year for Pies Descalzos

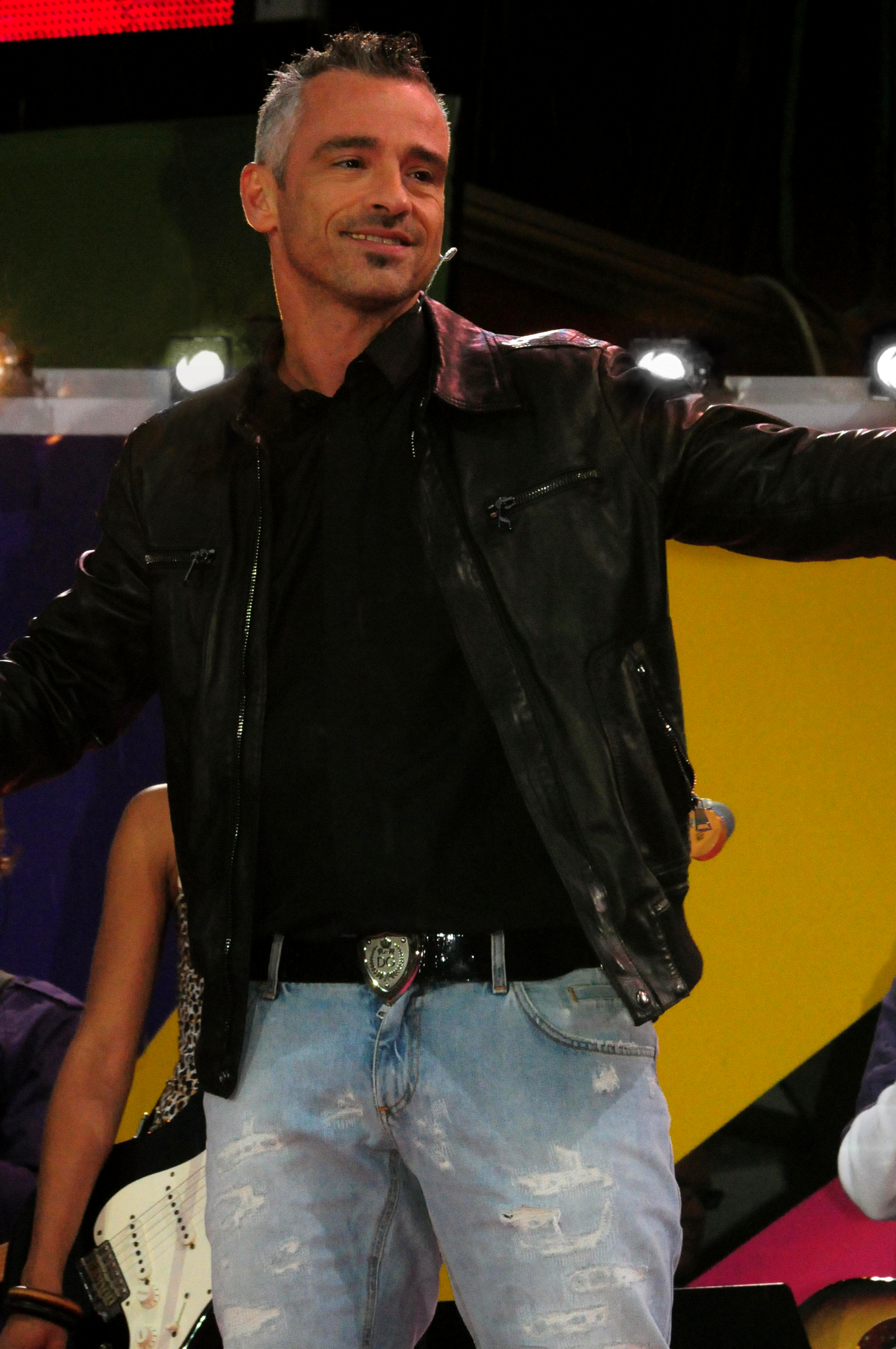
Italian singer-songwriter Eros Ramazzotti received the Video of the Year award for "La Aurora".

Winners were announced before the live audience during the ceremony. Mexican singer-songwriter Marco Antonio Solís was the most nominated performer, with five nominations which resulted in one win for "Regional Mexican Male Artist of the Year"; the rest of Solís' nominations were awarded to Spanish singer Enrique Iglesias ("Pop Album of the Year", "Pop Male Artist of the Year", and "Pop Song of the Year"). Iglesias was awarded "Pop Song of the Year" and "Pop Album of the Year" the year before with his debut album and with "Si Tu Te Vas", respectively. Colombian singer Shakira, the most nominated female performer with five nominations, received two awards: "Pop Female Artist" and "Pop New Artist". Three songs nominated for Pop Song of the Year reached number-one at the Billboard Top Latin Songs chart (both Iglesias "Experiencia Religiosa" and "Por Amarte", and "¡Basta Ya!" by Puerto-Rican singer Olga Tañón). Italian performer Eros Ramazzotti earned the accolade for Best Music Video for "La Aurora".

Dominican band Ilegales and American singer Marc Anthony dominated the Tropical/Salsa field earning two awards each, Ilegales won for "Song of the Year" with "La Morena" and "Group of the Year"; while Anthony received "Album of the Year" and "Male Singer of the Year". In the Regional Mexican field, Límite received two awards, while performers Grupo Mojado, Los Tigres del Norte, and Ana Bárbara each earned one accolade.

Winners and nominees of the 9th Annual Lo Nuestro Awards (winners listed first)
Pop Album of the Year	Pop Song of the Year
Enrique Iglesias – Vivir; Luis Miguel – Nada Es Igual...; Shakira – Pies Descalzos; Marco Antonio Solís – En Pleno Vuelo; Olga Tañón – Nuevos Senderos	Enrique Iglesias – "Experiencia Religiosa" (written by Cheín García-Alonso); Enrique Iglesias – "Por Amarte" (written by Iglesias and Roberto Morales); Amanda Miguel – "Amame Una Vez Más" (written by Miguel, Diego Verdaguer and Anahi); Shakira – "Estoy Aquí" (written by Shakira and Luis Fernando Ochoa); Olga Tañón – "¡Basta Ya!" (written by Marco Antonio Solís)
Male Artist of the Year, Pop	Female Artist of the Year, Pop
Enrique Iglesias; Cristian; Luis Miguel; Marco Antonio Solís	Shakira; Laura Pausini; Olga Tañón; Thalía
Pop Group of the Year	New Pop Artist of the Year
Maná; Barrio Boyzz; Donato y Estéfano; Mestizzo	Shakira; David; Fey; Gemini
Regional Mexican Album of the Year	Regional Mexican Song of the Year
Los Tigres del Norte – Unidos Para Siempre; Ana Bárbara – Ay Amor; La Mafia – Un Millón de Rosas; Pedro Fernández – Pedro Fernández; Los Mismos – Juntos Para Siempre	Grupo Mojado – "Piensa en Mi" (written by Barrientos y Lozano); Límite – "El Principe" (written by Juan Francisco Alazán); La Mafia – "Un Millón de Rosas" (written by Armando Larrinaga); Marco Antonio Solís – "Que Pena Me Das" (written by Solís); Los Tigres del Norte – "El Circo" (written by Jesse Armenta)
Male Artist of the Year, Regional Mexican	Female Artist of the Year, Regional Mexican
Marco Antonio Solís; Alejandro Fernández; Pedro Fernández; Juan Gabriel	Ana Bárbara; Graciela Beltrán; Laura Flores; Nydia Rojas
Regional Mexican Group of the Year	New Regional Mexican Artist of the Year
Límite; Bronco; La Mafia; Los Mismos	Límite; Angeles Azules; Jennifer y los Jetz; Bobby Pulido
Tropical/Salsa Album of the Year	Tropical/Salsa Song of the Year
Marc Anthony – Todo a Su Tiempo; La Makina – La Makina; Manny Manuel – Auténtico; Gilberto Santa Rosa – Esencia; Jerry Rivera – Fresco	Ilegales – "La Morena" (written by Vladimir Dotel); La Makina – "Mi Reina" (written by Orlando Santana); Marc Anthony – "Llegaste a Mi" (written by Omar Alfanno); Marc Anthony – "Hasta Ayer" (written by Manny Delgado); Jerry Rivera – "Loco de Amor" (written by Mari Laruet)
Male Artist of the Year, Tropical/Salsa	Female Artist of the Year, Tropical/Salsa
Marc Anthony; Kinito Méndez; Jerry Rivera; Gilberto Santa Rosa; Sergio Vargas	Jailene Cintrón; Brenda K. Starr; Gisselle; Jessica
Tropical/Salsa Group of the Year	New Tropical/Salsa Artist of the Year
Ilegales; Los Hermanos Rosario; El Gran Combo; Grupo Manía	Grupo Manía; Luis Damón; DLG; La Makina
Video of the Year
Eros Ramazzotti – "La Aurora"; Café Tacuba – "Como Te Extraño"; Chayanne – "Volver a Nacer"; Luis Miguel – "Dame"; Laura Pausini – "Las Cosas Que Vives"; Daniela Romo – "Mátame"; Shakira – "Pies Descalzos, Sueños Blancos"; Álvaro Torres – "Stress"; Diego Torres – "Sé Que Ya No Volverás"; Zucchero – "Menta y Romero"

== Special awards ==
- Lo Nuestro Excellence Award: Mariachi Vargas de Tecalitlán
- Special Tribute: Juan Gabriel

== See also ==
- 1996 in Latin music
- 1997 in Latin music
- Grammy Award for Best Latin Pop Album
