= Esperaré a Que Te Decidas =

1996 single by Tony Vega

Single by Tony Vega

from the album Tony Vega
- Released: 1996
- Genre: Salsa
- Length: 4:49
- Label: RMM
- Songwriter(s): Mary Lauret

Tony Vega singles chronology
"Si Yo Vuelvo a Encontrarla" (1995)	"Esperaré a Que Te Decidas" (1996)	"Doble Amor" (1996)

"Esperaré a Que Te Decidas" ("I'll Wait For You to Make a Decision") is a song written by Mary Lauret and performed by Puerto Rican salsa singer Tony Vega on his studio album on his 1996 self-titled studio album and was released as the lead single from the album. It became his first and (to date) only number one song on the Tropical Airplay chart. It was recognized as recognized as one of the best-performing songs of the year at the 1997 ASCAP Latin Awards on the tropical field.

== Charts ==
=== Weekly charts ===
Chart (1996)	Peak position
US Hot Latin Songs (Billboard)	12
US Tropical Airplay (Billboard)	1

=== Year-end charts ===
Chart (1996)	Position
US Tropical Airplay (Billboard)	7

== See also ==
- List of Billboard Tropical Airplay number ones of 1996
