= Hasta Ayer =

1996 single by Marc Anthony

Song by Los Terrícolas

from the album Hasta Ayer
- Released: 1979
- Genre: Latin pop
- Length: 3:52
- Label: Discolando
- Songwriter: Manny Delgado

"Hasta Ayer"

Single by Marc Anthony

from the album Todo a Su Tiempo
- Language: Spanish
- Released: 1996
- Studio: Quad Recording Studios (New York City)
- Genre: Bachata; bolero
- Length: 4:40
- Label: RMM
- Songwriter: Manny Delgado
- Producers: Marc Anthony; Sergio George

Marc Anthony singles chronology
"Mejores Que Ella" (1996)	"Hasta Ayer" (1996)	"Por Amar Se Da Todo" (1996)

"Hasta Ayer" (English: Until Yesterday) is a written by Manny Delgado and performed by Venezuelan band Los Terricolas on their 1979 studio album of the same title. It was later covered by Puerto Rican-American singer-songwriter Marc Anthony on his second studio album Todo a Su Tiempo (1995). On the review of the album, Achy Obejas of The Chicago Tribune called an " oldie but goodie totally transformed by soulful crooning.". A music video for Marc Anthony's version was filmed in Mexico City and directed by Benny Corral. At the 1997 Lo Nuestro Awards, it was nominated Tropical Song of the Year. It was recognized as the best-performing songs of the year at the 1997 ASCAP Latin Awards in tropical field.

== Charts ==
=== Weekly charts ===
Chart (1996)	Peak position
US Hot Latin Songs (Billboard)	6
US Tropical Airplay (Billboard)	1

=== Year-end charts ===
Chart (1996)	Position
US Tropical Airplay (Billboard)	3

== See also ==
- List of Billboard Tropical Airplay number ones of 1996
