= Ironía (Frankie Ruiz song) =

1996 single by Frankie Ruiz

Single by Frankie Ruiz

from the album Tranquilo
- Released: 1996
- Genre: Salsa
- Length: 5:02
- Label: PolyGram Latino
- Songwriter(s): Jankarlos Nuñez
- Producer(s): Vinny Urrutia

Frankie Ruiz singles chronology
"Mi Formula de Amor" (1995)	"Ironía" (1996)	"Tranquilo" (1996)

"Ironía" ("Irony") is a song written by Jankarlos Nuñez and performed by Puerto Rican salsa singer Frankie Ruiz on his final studio album Tranquilo (1996) and was released as the lead single from the album. It became his second and final one song on the Tropical Airplay chart and tied with "Loco de Amor" as the longest-running number one song of 1996 on the chart. In the song, the singer notes the irony of being lovers with a woman of higher class while he himself is poor. "Ironía" was the best-performing tropical song of 1996 in the United States. "Ironía" won the Billboard Latin Music Award for Hot Tropical/Salsa Track of the Year in 1997 and was recognized as one of the award-winning songs at the ASCAP Latin Awards in the same year.

== Charts ==
=== Weekly charts ===
Chart (1996)	Peak position
US Hot Latin Songs (Billboard)	8
US Tropical Airplay (Billboard)	1

=== Year-end charts ===
Chart (1996)	Position
US Tropical Airplay (Billboard)	1

== See also ==
- List of Billboard Tropical Airplay number ones of 1996
