= Destino (disambiguation) =

Destino is a Disney animated short film.

It may also refer to:

- Destino (1963 TV series), a Mexican TV series
- Destino (1990 TV series), a Mexican TV series
- Destino (Brazilian TV series), a 2012 Brazilian TV series
- Destino (2013 TV series), a Mexican TV series
- Destino (Rey Ruiz album), 1996
- Destino (Alamat album), 2025
- Destino, a 2001 album by Barrio Boyzz
- Destino (magazine), a weekly Spanish magazine (1937-1980)

== See also ==
- Ediciones Destino, a Spanish Publisher.
- VLF Destino, a proposed automobile from American car company VLF Automotive
- Destiny (disambiguation)
