= Te Felicito (Grupo Mojado song) =

1992 song by Grupo Mojado

Song by Grupo Mojado

from the album La Gorda
- Released: 1992
- Genre: Grupera
- Length: 3:10
- Label: Fonovisa
- Songwriter: Felipe Barrientos

"Te Felicito" ("I Congratulate You") is a song by Grupo Mojado and written by Felipe Barrientos for their studio album La Gorda (1992). It was later covered by Mexican actress and singer Laura Flores on her studio album, Nunca Hagas Llorar a Una Mujer (1995), which received airplay on the grupera charts in Mexico. It was also covered by Puerto Rican singer Jessica Cristina on her first merengue album, Me Gusta Todo de Ti (1996). Cristina's version reached #1 on the Billboard Tropical Airplay chart and was recognized as one of the best-performing Latin songs of the year at the 1998 BMI Latin Awards.

== See also ==
- List of Billboard Tropical Airplay number ones of 1996
