= Magia (Jerry Rivera album) =

Studio album by Jerry Rivera
- Released: June 27, 1995
- Recorded: 1994–95
- Genre: Salsa
- Length: 46:25
- Label: Sony Discos
- Producer: Cuto Soto

Jerry Rivera chronology
Cara de Niño (1993)	Magia (1995)	Fresco (1996)

Singles from Magia
- 1. "Magia" Released: April 1995; 2. "Ahora Que Estoy Solo" Released: September 1995; 3. "Un Amor Verdadero" Released: January 1996

Professional ratings
Review scores
Source	Rating
Allmusic	4/5 stars

Magia (Magic) is the fifth studio album recorded by Puerto Rican salsa singer Jerry Rivera released on June 27, 1995.

== Track listing ==
This information adapted from Allmusic.

No.	Title	Writer(s)	Length
1.	"Ahora Que Estoy Solo"	Mary Lauret	3:51
2.	"Magia"	Omar Alfanno	4:33
3.	"Trébol de Cuatro Hojas"	Alejandro Vezzani	4:31
4.	"Un Amor Verdadero"	Omar Alfanno	5:06
5.	"Amor Mágico"	Reinaldo "Pachy" Lopez	4:34
6.	"Nunca Imaginé"	Omar Alfanno	5:06
7.	"Gracias"	Omar Alfanno	5:07
8.	"Corazón Roto"	Pedro Arroyo	4:14
9.	"Loco Enamorado"	Eric Leris	4:29
10.	"Tierra Sin Sol"	Giovanni Jimeniz	4:54

== Chart performance ==
Chart (1995)	Peak position
U.S. Billboard Top Latin Albums	5
U.S. Billboard Tropical Albums	1

== Certification ==
Region	Certification	Certified units/sales
United States (RIAA)	Platinum (Latin)	100,000^{^}
^{^} Shipments figures based on certification alone.

== See also ==
- List of number-one Billboard Tropical Albums from the 1990s
