= Abriendo Puertas =

Abriendo Puertas (English: Opening Doors) may refer to:

- Abriendo Puertas (Jerry Rivera album), a 1990 album released by Puerto-Rican singer Jerry Rivera
- Abriendo Puertas (Gloria Estefan album), a 1995 album released by Cuban singer Gloria Estefan
  - "Abriendo Puertas" (song), a song from the album
