= Alquimia =

Alquimia (Spanish for alchemy) may refer to:

- Alquimia (band) salsa trio from Colombia
- Alquimia album by Venezuelan gaita zuliana group Gran Coquivacoa 1997
