= Volverás =

Volverás may refer to:

- Volverás (film), or You'll Be Back, a 2002 Spanish-Mexican film
- "Volverás" (Los Terrícolas song), 1973
- "Volveras" (Ricky Martin song), 1997
- "Volverás", a song by Gloria Estefan from Mi Tierra, 1993
- "Volverás", a song by Paulina Rubio from Pau-Latina, 2004
