= Jailene Cintrón =

Puerto Rican singer (born 1966)

- Born: Jailene Cintrón; May 28, 1966 (age 59); Río Piedras, San Juan, Puerto Rico
- Occupation: Merengue singer
- Instrument: Voice
- Years active: 1991–present
- Labels: EMI Latin

Jailene Cintrón, credited as Jailene (born 28 May 1966) is a Puerto Rican merengue singer and recording artist, as well as a TV personality and entertainer.

She was the female co-host of the talk and variety show No te Duermas from 1991 to 1996. She is currently one of the co-hosts of Pégate al Mediodía.

Her 1999 album Encontré el amor was among the four works nominated for the 2000 Grammy Award for Best Merengue Album.

== Personal life ==
Cintrón married businessman José Juan Arce in the late 90s. The couple has two daughters together.

== Awards ==
=== Lo Nuestro Awards ===
The Lo Nuestro Awards are awarded annually by television network Univision in the United States. Cintrón has received one award from four nominations.

Year	Nominee / work	Award	Result
1996	"Herself"	Tropical Salsa New Artist	Nominated
1996	"Herself"	Tropical Salsa Female Artist	Nominated
1997	"Herself"	Tropical Salsa Female Artist	Won
1998	"Herself"	Tropical Salsa Female Artist	Nominated

== Discography ==
- 1995: Jailene, EMI Latin
- 1996: Como Toda Mujer, EMI Latin
- 1996: Es Navidad, EMI Latin
- 1997: Aquí Estoy, EMI Latin
- 1998: Encontré el Amor, EMI Latin
- 2005: Sólo Por Ti

== See also ==
- List of Puerto Ricans
