= Una y Mil Veces =

1996 song by Cristian Castro

Song by Cristian

from the album El Deseo de Oír Tu Voz
- Released: 1996
- Recorded: 1995
- Studio: Old House Studios (New York City, U.S.A.)
- Genre: Latin pop · latin ballad
- Length: 5:25
- Label: Melody/Fonovisa
- Songwriter: Donato Póveda
- Producer: Daniel Freiberg

"Una y Mil Veces" (English: A Thousand and One Times) is a written by Cuban singer-songwriter Donato Póveda and performed by Mexican singer-songwriter Cristian Castro on his fourth studio album El Deseo de Oír Tu Voz (1996). The song received airplay on Latin pop radio stations in the United States and peaked at No. 17 on the Billboard Latin Pop Airplay chart. It was later covered by Puerto Rican salsa singer Jerry Rivera on his sixth studio album Fresco also released in 1996. Rivera's version peaked at No. 1 on the Tropical Airplay chart, becoming his third number one song on the chart. Rivera's version was recognized as one of the best-performing songs of the year at the 1997 ASCAP Latin Awards on the tropical field.

== See also ==
- List of Billboard Tropical Airplay number ones of 1996
