= Hay Que Poner el Alma =

1996 song by Víctor Manuelle

Single by Víctor Manuelle

from the album Victor Manuelle
- Language: Spanish
- Released: 1996
- Studio: Powerlight, Puerto Rico; Sir Sound Recording, NY
- Genre: Salsa
- Length: 5:06
- Label: Sony Discos
- Songwriter(s): Omar Alfanno
- Producer(s): Sergio George

Víctor Manuelle singles chronology
"Voy a Prometerme" (1995)	"Hay Que Poner el Alma" (1996)	"Volverás" (1996)

"Hay Que Poner el Alma" (English: "You’ve Gotta Put Your Soul Into It") is a song written by Omar Alfanno and performed by Puerto Rican singer Víctor Manuelle on his 1996 self-titled studio album and was released as the lead single from the album. It became his first number song on the Tropical Airplay where it spent six weeks on this position and was the second best-performing tropical song of 1996. José A.Estévez, Jr. of AllMusic listed the song as one of the album's highlights. "Hay Que Poner el Alma" won "Tropical Song of the Year" at the 1997 SESAC Latin Music Awards which was presented to Alfanno.

== Charts ==
=== Weekly charts ===
Chart (1996)	Peak position
US Hot Latin Songs (Billboard)	6
US Tropical Airplay (Billboard)	1

=== Year-end charts ===
Chart (1996)	Position
US Tropical Airplay (Billboard)	2

== See also ==
- List of Billboard Tropical Airplay number ones of 1996
