= Tú Cómo Estás =

1996 single by Domingo Quiñones

Single by Domingo Quiñones

from the album Mi Mieta
- Released: 1996
- Genre: Salsa
- Length: 4:57
- Label: RMM
- Songwriter(s): Gustavo Márquez
- Producer(s): Carlos "Cuto" Sota; Domingo Quiñones

Domingo Quiñones singles chronology
| "Enseñáme" (1992) | "Tú Cómo Estás" (1996) | "Si Tú Te Vas" (1996) |

"Tú Cómo Estás" ("How Are You?") is a song written by Gustavo Márquez and performed by Domingo Quiñones on his studio album Mi Meta (1996). In the song, the artist wonders how his former love is doing and if she misses him. It became his first and (to date) only number one song on the Tropical Airplay in the US where it spent two weeks on top. José A.Estévez, Jr. of AllMusic called it "among the singer's finest moments" and praised the arrangement by Ramón Sánchez. It was recognized as recognized as one of the best-performing songs of the year at the 1997 ASCAP Latin Awards on the tropical field.

== Charts ==
=== Weekly charts ===
| Chart (1996) | Peak position |
|---|---|
| US Hot Latin Songs (Billboard) | 13 |
| US Tropical Airplay (Billboard) | 1 |

=== Year-end charts ===
| Chart (1996) | Position |
|---|---|
| US Tropical Airplay (Billboard) | 9 |

== See also ==
- List of Billboard Tropical Airplay number ones of 1996
