= Laura Flores =

Mexican actress, hostess and singer

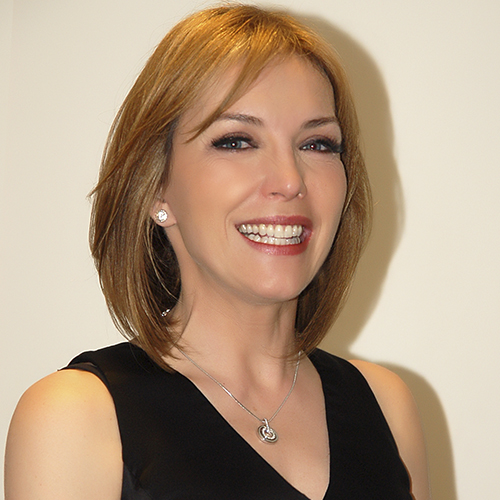
- Flores in 2013
- Born: August 23, 1963 (age 63); Reynosa, Tamaulipas, Mexico
- Occupations: Actress, singer, hostess
- Label: Aquarius Musikindo
- Spouse(s): Miguel Duran; Sergio Fachelli (1986–1989); José Ramón Diez (1998–2007)
- Children: Maria, Patricio, Alejandro and Ana Sofía

Laura Aurora Flores Heras (born August 23, 1963) is a Mexican actress, hostess and singer.

== Biography ==
Flores had a hit single, "El Alma No Tiene Color" ("The Soul Has No Color"), which was a duet with Marco Antonio Solís taken from the album Me Quedé Vacía, which received a Gold album certification in Mexico. Solís also produced her album Nunca Hagas Llorar a Una Mujer (1995), which had four successful singles: "Antes de Que Te Vayas," "Porque Sé Que Me Mientes," the title track, and the Grupo Mojado cover "Te Felicito." These singles received airplay on the grupera charts in Mexico.

Her first taste of stardom came when she joined Hermanos y Amigos, a group composed of her family members. The band toured extensively in Mexico, the Netherlands, Germany, and Spain for almost three years. Flores' desire to improve her acting skills led her to study at the El Centro de Estudios Artísticos de Televisa (CEA). Her first acting opportunity came during a musical presentation in Tampico, where a producer offered her a role in the telenovela El combate, starring Ignacio López Tarso. In 1980, Luis de Llano Macedo offered her the opportunity to sing and record some songs in English in the program Noche de Noche, hosted by Verónica Castro. In 1981, Flores starred in her first musical, Los Fantásticos. She later hosted several special programs that aired in the early 1980s. In 1992, she recorded her first solo album, Barcos de papel, which led her to tour throughout Mexico.

In 1986, Flores married Uruguayan songwriter and singer Sergio Fachelli, who produced De Corazón a Corazón y Fruto Prohibido, but the marriage ended three years later. She has appeared in telenovelas such as Los Años pasan, Clarisa, El vuelo del águila, Marisol, El Amor tiene cara de mujer, El alma no tiene color, Gotita de amor, and Siempre te amaré. In 2005, after a brief hiatus, she returned to acting in Piel de otoño.

In 1995, she sang some of her songs in a radio station event at the Rancho Moreno in Chino, California. At the 9th Lo Nuestro Awards, Flores received a nomination for Regional Mexican Female Singer of the Year. The following year, she was nominated for Pop Singer of the Year.

From 1995 to 1997, she hosted the Mexican version of Wheel of Fortune, La Rueda de la Fortuna. The program aired on El Canal De Las Estrellas ("The Channel of the Stars").

In 2006, she played a co-protagonist role in Mundo de Fieras with César Évora. The next year, she continues working as his wife in Al Diablo con los Guapos as a villain who later turns good.

In 2008, she left the program Hoy to star in the telenovela En Nombre del Amor as Camila Ríos, the mother of the villain.

In 2009, she was part of the telenovela Corazón salvaje as Juan del Diablo's mother.

In fall 2010, she appeared in Mujeres Asesinas.

Since 2014, Flores has been working with Telemundo. She first played a special participation in En Otra Piel as Mónica Serrano, and later became part of the main cast of Reina de Corazones.

For her work in television and in the recording industry, Flores has had her handprints embedded at the Paseo de las Luminarias in Mexico City.

In 2019, she returned to Televisa in the telenovela Juntos el corazón nunca se equivoca starring Emilio Osorio and Joaquín Bondoni, in which she played the role of Soledad de Ortega.

== Filmography ==
Television films and series
Year	Title	Role	Notes
1980	El combate	Mariana	
1981	El derecho de nacer	Amelia	
1982	En busca del paraíso	Yolanda	
1984	Tú eres mi destino	Rosa Martha	
1984	Los años felices	María	
1985	Los años pasan	María	Sequel to Los años felices
1985	Cartas de amor	Unknown role	
1986	Ave Fénix	Paulina	
1990	Mi pequeña Soledad	Dulce María	
1991	La pícara soñadora	Mónica Rochild #1	
1993	Clarisa	Elidé González León	
1994	Mujer, casos de la vida real	Unknown role	Episode: "Nunca más"
1994	El amor tiene cara de mujer	Victoria	
1994	El vuelo del águila	Emperatriz Carlota	
1996	Marisol	Sandra Luján	
1997	El alma no tiene color	Guadalupe Roldán	
1998	Gotita de amor	María Fernanda De Santiago	
1999	Cuento de Navidad	An angel (The pretty woman)	
1999	Tres mujeres	Sandra María Aguirre	
1999	Yo soy Betty, la fea	Herself	2 episodes
2000	Siempre te amaré	Victoria Robles de Castellanos / Amparo Rivas	
2000	Carita de ángel	Laura	2 episodes
2001	Cero en conducta	Laurita	
2002–2003	Cómplices al rescate	Rocío Cantú de Del Río	
2003	La decada furiosa	Host	Television film
2003	La hora pico	Herself	
2005	Piel de otoño	Lucía Villareal de Mendoza	
2005	Bajo el mismo techo	Laura Acosta	
2006–2007	Mundo de fieras	Regina Guerra de Martínez	
2007	Destilando Amor	Priscilla	
2007–2008	Al diablo con los guapos	Luciana Arango de Belmonte	
2008	Las tontas no van al cielo	Luciana Arango	
2008	Secretos	Miriam Garza	2 episodes
2008–2009	En nombre del amor	Camila Ríos de Mondragón	
2009–2010	Corazón salvaje	María del Rosario Montes de Oca	
2010–2011	Llena de amor	Ernestina Pavón / Netty	
2011	Una familia con suerte	Yuyú Arteaga	22 episodes
2012	Un refugio para el amor	Roselena de Torreslanda	
2013	Nueva vida	María	Episode: "Todos mis hijos"
2014	En otra piel	Mónica Serrano	
2014	Reina de corazones	Sara Smith / Virginia de la Vega	
2015–2016	¿Quién es quién?	Inés González	
2016	Señora Acero: La Coyote	Edelmira Rigores	19 episodes
2017	La Fan	Paloma	21 episodes
2018	Mi familia perfecta	Irma Solís	
2019	Juntos, el corazón nunca se equivoca	Soledad Elizalde	
2019–2020	Soltero con hijas	Alondra Ruvalcaba	
2021	Fuego ardiente	Laura Urquidi	
2022	Hasta que la plata nos separe	Clemencia Maldonado	
2023–2024	Vuelve a mí	Martha Guevara	
2024	Tu vida es mi vida	Gracia Martínez Torres	
2024	Las hijas de la señora García	Cecilia Borbón de Portilla	Guest star
2025	Los hilos del pasado	Elena	
2025	Cómplices	Paula	

== Awards and nominations ==
=== Premios TVyNovelas ===
Year	Category	Telenovela	Result
1983	Best Female Revelation	El Derecho de Nacer	Won
1985	Best Young Lead Actress	Los años felices	Nominated
1994	Best Female Antagonist	Clarisa	Nominated
2007	Best Co-Star Actress	Mundo de Fieras	Nominated
2010	Best Co-Star Actress	Corazón Salvaje	Nominated

=== Premios lo Nuestro ===
Year	Category	Result	Ref.
1997	Female Artist of the Year, Regional Mexican	Nominated	
1998	Female Artist of the Year, Pop	Nominated	

=== Premios People en Español ===
Year	Category	Telenovela	Result
2012	Best Supporting Actress	Un Refugio para el Amor	Nominated

=== Premios Tu Mundo ===
Year	Category	Telenovela	Result	Ref.
2014	Favorite Protagonist	En otra piel	Nominated	
2015	Lead Actress	Reina de corazones	Nominated	
