= Cuenta Conmigo =

1992 album by Jerry Rivera

Studio album by Jerry Rivera
- Released: May 26, 1992
- Studios: Ochoa Recording Studios, San Juan, Puerto Rico
- Genre: Salsa
- Length: 48:00
- Language: Spanish
- Label: Sony Discos
- Producer: Cuto Soto

Jerry Rivera chronology
Abriendo Puertas (1990)	Cuenta Conmigo (1992)	Cara de Niño (1993)

Singles from Cuenta Conmigo
- 1. "Casi un Hechizo" Released: 1992; 2. "Amores Como el Nuestro" Released: 1992; 3. "Cuenta Conmigo" Released: 1992; 4. "Una en un Millón" Released: 1993

Cuenta Conmigo (transl. Count on Me) is the third studio album by Puerto Rican singer Jerry Rivera. It was released on May 26, 1992, by Sony Discos. Cuenta Conmigo is a salsa album with the lyrics dealing with love. The album received positive reactions from music critics who praised the compositions and musical style. Cuenta Conmigo won the Lo Nuestro Award for Tropical Album of the Year in 1993.

Commercially, Cuenta Conmigo topped the Billboard Tropical Albums chart in the United States for 20 weeks and was certified platinum in Central America, Colombia, and Venezuela. It sold over half a million copies with several journalists describing it as the bestselling salsa album since Siembra (1978) by Rubén Blades and Willie Colón. Four singles were released from the album: "Casi un Hechizo", "Amores Como el Nuestro", the title track, and "Una en un Millón".

== Background and musical style ==
Panamanian musician Omar Alfanno composed three songs for Cuenta Conmigo. AllMusic critic José A. Estévez, Jr. noted these tracks became salsa standards.

In 1990, Jerry Rivera released his second studio album, Abriendo Puertas. It became his first number one on the Billboard Tropical Albums chart, was nominated Tropical Album of the Year at the 4th Annual Lo Nuestro Awards, and sold over 100,000 copies. Following its success, Rivera was pressured by his record label to record another album. Cuto Soto, who produced Abriendo Puertas, was involved in the production of Rivera's next album, Cuenta Conmigo. Recording for the album took place at the Ochoa Recording Studios in San Juan, Puerto Rico.

A reviewer for Billboard described the musical style of Cuenta Conmigo as "another romantic salsa effort" and the songs as "puppy-love numbers". The opening track, "Casi un Hechizo", was originally performed by Colombian singer Carlos Vives for his album, Al Centro de la Ciudad (1989). Rivera also covers Vives' song "Me Estoy Mueriendo de Amor" from the album Por Fuera y Por Dentro (1986). Panamanian musician Omar Alfanno composed three tracks for the album including "Amores Como el Nuestro", "Una en un Millón", and the title track. On "Amores Como el Nuestro", the singer narrates about a "sublime, tender, sincere love that a couple experiences in a world where this feeling seems to take a back seat". On the title track, the singer "stays in love after a breakup". Other notable composers for the album include Jorge Luis Piloto and Domingo Quiñones.

== Promotion and reception ==
Professional ratings
Review scores
Source	Rating
AllMusic	4/5 stars

Cuenta Conmigo was released on May 26, 1992, by Sony Discos. "Casi un Hechizo" was released as the lead single in 1992 and peaked at number 22 on the Billboard Hot Latin Songs chart in the US. An accompanying music video was released for the song. The following single, "Amores Como el Nuestro", became the highest-charting single from the album when it reached number 16 on the Hot Latin Songs chart. The title track was released as the third single and peaked at number 24 on the Hot Latin Songs charts. The fourth single, "Una en un Millón", also reached number 22 on the Hot Latin Songs chart. "Me Estoy Enamorando" was released as a promotional single where it received airplay in Puerto Rico.

AllMusic critic José A. Estévez, Jr. praised Alfanno's compositions and Rivera's performance of "Casi un Hechizo". A reviewer for Billboard lauded the "[p]unchy brass lines" which they felt were "neatly counterbalanced by airy synthesized strings". Elmo R. Lugo of El Nuevo Herald opined that the album is not "Menudo with a salsa beat. It's not Willie Colón either. His LP, Cuenta Conmigo, is just that. A great addition to any tropical music collection". At the 5th Annual Lo Nuestro Award in 1993, Cuenta Conmigo won the Lo Nuestro Award for Tropical Album of the Year.

Commercially, Cuenta Conmigo topped the Tropical Albums charts for 20 weeks and was the best-selling tropical album of 1993 in the US. The album was certified quadruple platinum by the Recording Industry Association of America in the Latin field for shipping over 400,000 copies in the US. It was also certified platinum in Central America, Colombia, and Venezuela. It sold over 30,000 and 120,000 copies in Central America and Venezuela, respectively. Rivera was presented with the Premio Cristal by his record label in recognition of over half a million units sold. Several music journalists have describe the sales of Cuenta Conmigo as the bestselling salsa album since Siembra (1978) by Rubén Blades and Willie Colón.

== Track listing ==
No.	Title	Writer(s)	Arranger(s)	Length
1.	"Casi un Hechizo"	Pablo Manavello; Ricardo Montaner	Cuto Soto	4:35
2.	"Amores Como el Nuestro"	Omar Alfanno	Ramón Sánchez	5:00
3.	"A Ti Mi Nena"	Raldy Vázquez	Soto	4:38
4.	"Me Estoy Muriendo de Amor"	Fernando Garabito	Sánchez	4:54
5.	"El Príncipe de la Ciudad"	Peña y Guadalupe	Angel Nieves	4:37
6.	"Una en un Millón"	Alfanno	Tito Rivera	4:59
7.	"Amor de Colegio"	Mario Diaz	Soto	4:28
8.	"Chiquilla"	Domingo Quiñones; Soto	Soto	4:59
9.	"Cuenta Conmigo"	Alfanno	Sánchez	5:03
10.	"Me Estoy Enamorando"	Jorge Luís Piloto	Roberto Pérez	4:47

== Personnel ==
Credits were adapted from AllMusic and the liner notes of Cuenta Conmigo.

- Angel Nieves – arranger
- Chegui Ramos – backing vocalist
- Carlos "Cuto" Soto – arranger, mixing, producer, trombone, backing vocalist
- Domingo Garcia – piano
- Julio Alberto Planell – design
- Mario Houben – art direction
- Oscar Pastrana – trombone
- Pedro Pérez – Bass
- Pichie Perez – güiro, maracas, backing vocalist
- Rafi Claudio – concept, photography
- Ramón Sánchez – arranger, Keyboards
- Roberto Roena – bongos
- Sonny Hernandez – engineer, mixing
- Tito de Garcia – timbales
- Tito Rivera – arranger
- Toñito Vázquez – trombone
- Vicente Cusi Castillo – trumpet
- Wanda Montes – make-up, stylist
- Ángel "Angie" Machado – Trumpet

== Charts ==
=== Weekly charts ===
Weekly chart performance for Cuenta Conmigo
Chart (1992–93)	Peak position
US Top Latin Albums (Billboard)	16
US Tropical Albums (Billboard)	1

=== All-time charts ===
All-time chart performance for Cuenta Conmigo
Chart (1985–1994)	Position
US Tropical Albums (Billboard)	1

=== Year-end charts ===
1992 year-end chart performance for Cuenta Conmigo
Chart (1992)	Position
US Tropical Albums (Billboard)	4

1993 year-end chart performance for Cuenta Conmigo
Chart (1993)	Position
US Tropical Albums (Billboard)|	1

== Certifications and sales ==
Region	Certification	Certified units/sales
Colombia	Platinum	
Puerto Rico	—	160,000
United States (RIAA)	4× Platinum (Latin)	400,000^{^}
Venezuela	Platinum	120,000
Summaries
Central America	Platinum	30,000
Worldwide	—	500,000
^{^} Shipments figures based on certification alone.

== See also ==
- List of Billboard Tropical Albums number ones from the 1990s
