= Una storia importante (album) =

Studio album by Eros Ramazzotti
- Released: 21 November 2025
- Recorded: 2014–2025
- Languages: Italian; Spanish; English
- Labels: Friends & Partners; Sony
- Producers: Eros Ramazzotti; Michele Canova; Alicia Keys; Federico Barreto; Juan Giménez Kuj; Mauro De Tommaso; Claudio Guidetti; Celso Valli; Elisa Toffoli; Marz & Zef; Orlando Aispuro Meneses; Federico Barreto; Juan Giménez Kuj; Mauro De Tommaso; Will Meldini

Eros Ramazzotti chronology
Battito Infinito (2022)	Una storia importante (2025)

Singles from Una storia importante
- 1. "Il mio giorno preferito" Released: 22 August 2025; 2. "L'Aurora / La Aurora" Released: 21 November 2025

Una storia importante (English: "An important story"), also known by its Spanish name Una Historia Importante, is the sixteenth studio album by Eros Ramazzotti, released on 21 November 2025 through Friends & Partners and Sony Music.

== Background and composition ==
The project consists of fifteen tracks featuring both new songs and reworkings of songs from Ramazzotti's discography. The album features American R&B singer Alicia Keys and Latin American singers Carín León, Kany García and Lali, alongside the appearance of Italian singers Elisa, Giorgia, Andrea Bocelli, Max Pezzali, Ultimo and Jovanotti.

== Promotion ==
=== Live performances and world tour ===
On 17 and 18 October, Ramazzotti premiered the song "Buona stella" with Italian singer-songwriter Elisa during his concert at the Ziggo Dome in Amsterdam, Netherlands.

From February to November 2026, Ramazzotti will embark on his Una Storia Importante World Tour across Europe, the United States and Latin America.

=== Singles ===
The lead singles "Il mio giorno preferito / Mi día preferido" was published on 22 August 2025. The second single is a re-release of the song "L'Aurora / La Aurora", featuring vocals by Alicia Keys, was released at the same day as the Spanish language version of the album. The Italian language version was released a day later.

== Track listing ==
=== Una storia importante ===
Standard edition

No.	Title	Writer(s)	Producer(s)	Length
1.	"Il mio giorno preferito"	Eros Ramazzotti; Michele Canova; Antonio Cirigliano; Edoardo D'Erme; Tommaso Paradiso	Ramazzotti; Canova	3:26
2.	"L'Aurora" (with Alicia Keys)	Ramazzotti; Adelio Cogliati	Ramazzotti; Alicia Augello Cook	5:09
3.	"Un’emozione per sempre" (with Ultimo)	Ramazzotti; Cogliati; Claudio Guidetti; Maurizio Fabrizio	Ramazzotti; Guidetti; Celso Valli	3:56
4.	"Come nei film" (with Max Pezzali)	Ramazzotti; Canova; Alessio Nelli; Gianni Balisilio; Vincenzo Colella	Ramazzotti; Canova	3:02
5.	"Festa"	Ramazzotti; Alfredo "Cheope" Rapetti; Edwyn Roberts; Fabrizio Fusaro; Simone Guzzino	Ramazzotti; Canova	3:25
6.	"La mia strada" (with Jovanotti)	Ramazzotti; Lorenzo Cherubini; Roberto Baldi	Ramazzotti; Canova	3:09
7.	"Buona stella" (with Elisa)	Ramazzotti; Elisa Toffoli; Jacopo Ettorre; Stefani Tognini; Alessandro Pulga	Ramazzotti; Toffoli; Marz & Zef; Will Meldini	3:29
8.	"Se bastasse una canzone" (with Andrea Bocelli)	Ramazzotti; Cogliati; Piero Cassano	Ramazzotti	5:23
9.	"Otra Como Tu" (with Carín León)	Ramazzotti; Cogliati; Cassano	Orlando Aispuro Meneses	4:21
10.	"Domani"		Ramazzotti; Canova	3:00
11.	"Quanto amore sei" (with Giorgia)	Ramazzotti; Cogliati; Guidetti	Ramazzotti	4:11
12.	"Solo insieme a te"	Ramazzotti; Cheope; Fusaro; Giuseppe Piol; Saverio Grandi	Ramazzotti; Canova	3:43
13.	"Stupide parole romantiche"	Ramazzotti; Colella; Marco Poletto; Nicola Iazzi	Ramazzotti; Canova	3:40
14.	"Fuego en el fuego" (with Lali)	Ramazzotti; Cogliati; Guidetti	Federico Barreto; Juan Giménez Kuj; Mauro De Tommaso	4:05
15.	"5 secondi"	Ramazzotti; Cheope; Grandi	Ramazzotti; Canova	3:12

=== Una Historia Importante ===
Standard edition

No.	Title	Length
1.	"Mi día preferido"
2.	"La aurora" (with Alicia Keys)
3.	"Una emoción para siempre" (with Kany García)
4.	"Si bastasen un par de canciones" (with Andrea Bocelli)
5.	"Fuego en el fuego" (with Lali)
6.	"Otra como tù" (with Carín León)
7.	"Mañana"
8.	"Fiesta"
9.	"La aventura" (with Jovanotti)
10.	"Cuanto amor me das" (with Giorgia)
11.	"Solo Junto a ti"
12.	"Estúpidas palabras románticas"
13.	"5 segundos"
14.	"Buona stella" (with Elisa)
15.	"Come nei film" (with Max Pezzali)

== Charts ==
Chart performance for Una storia importante
Chart (2025–2026)	Peak position
Austrian Albums (Ö3 Austria)	11
Belgian Albums (Ultratop Flanders)	20
Belgian Albums (Ultratop Wallonia)	11
Dutch Albums (Album Top 100)	45
French Albums (SNEP)	80
German Albums (Offizielle Top 100)	18
German Pop Albums (Offizielle Top 100)	9
Greek Albums (IFPI)	68
Hungarian Physical Albums (MAHASZ)	36
Italian Albums (FIMI)	1
Polish Albums (ZPAV)	92
Spanish Albums (Promusicae)	47
Swiss Albums (Schweizer Hitparade)	4

== Certifications ==
Certifications for Una storia importante
Region	Certification	Certified units/sales
Italy (FIMI)	Gold	25,000^{‡}
^{‡} Sales+streaming figures based on certification alone.
