= Santaye =

American singer-songwriter

- Born: Santa Reyes; Baní, Dominican Republic
- Origin: Miami, Florida, U.S.
- Genres: Pop; bachata; ballad
- Occupation: Singer-songwriter
- Instrument: Vocals
- Years active: 2010–present

Santa Reyes known professionally as Santaye, is a Dominican singer-songwriter based in Miami. She began her music career in 2010. Several of Santaye's singles have charted on US Billboard Tropical Songs. She was twice nominated for the Lo Nuestro Award for Tropical Female Artist of the Year.

== Early life ==
Reyes is from Baní, Dominican Republic. She has eight brothers. She was timid as a child, but frequently sang at schools and family reunions. When Santaye was seven, she moved to Miami. She wrote her first song when she was twelve years old. After graduating from college, she moved to New York.

== Career ==
Santaye began her career in 2010. She sings bachata in English and Spanish. When asked where her professional name derived from, Santaye responded that it comes from the "la diosa de los planetas para pacificar." Her first album was produced by Dan Warner and Lee Levin. She released the single "Eras Tu" in December 2012. Her single, "Invito a Quereme" was produced by Lenny Santos. In July 2013, Santaye released "In My Head," a single produced by Lenny Santos. Between November 2013 and January 2014, she recorded its music video. She signed a management deal with Aquos Entertainment.

== Artistry ==
Santaye has a romantic style of singing. Univision calls her style a fusion of pop, ballad, and bachata. She cites Rocío Dúrcal, Alejandra Guzmán, Pink and Thalía as influences on her style.

== Discography ==
=== Studio albums ===
- Corazón (2011)

=== Singles ===
Title	Year	Peak chart positions
Title	Year	US Tropical
"Lo que por ti yo siento"	2011	—
"Corazón"	2011	37
"Sabes que te amo"	2011	—
"Eras Tu"	2012	20
"In My Head"	2013	37
"Invito A Quereme" (with Yunel)	2016	33

== Awards and nominations ==
Year	Nominee / work	Award	Result
2012	Herself	Lo Nuestro Award for Tropical Female Artist of the Year	Nominated
2015	Herself	Lo Nuestro Award for Tropical Female Artist of the Year	Nominated

== Personal life ==
Santaye resides in Miami, Florida. She is a christian.
