= Sergio Fachelli =

Uruguayan musician

Sergio Fachelli (born March 28, 1952, in Montevideo, Uruguay) is an Uruguayan singer and songwriter, who had a successful career in the mid-1980s. After a 16-year hiatus, he returned to performing in 2018.

== Personal life ==
He was once married to Mexican actress and singer Laura Flores, who in 2021 accused him of being abusive to her.
