= Todo Mi Corazón =

1991 song by Yuri

Single by Yuri

from the album Soy Libre
- Released: 1991
- Genre: Latin pop
- Length: 4:39
- Label: Sony Discos
- Songwriter: Ilan Chester
- Producer: Mariano Pérez Bautista

Yuri singles chronology
"Quién Eres Tú" (1991)	"Todo Mi Corazón" (1991)	"Decir Adiós (A Través de los Años)" (1991)

"Todo Mi Corazón" (English: All My Heart) is a ballad written by Venezuelan singer-songwriter Ilan Chester and performed by Mexican singer Yuri on her 11th studio album Soy Libre (1991). It was released as the second single from the album and peaked at number No. 5 on the Hot Latin Songs chart in the US. A music video for the song was filmed and features Puerto Rican singer Ricky Martin. The music video was nominated in the Latin field for Best Female Artist at the 1991 Billboard Music Video Awards. Chester recorded his own rendition of the song on his album studio Un Mundo Mejor (1992). It was later covered by American salsa band Dark Latin Groove (DLG) on their 1996 self-titled debut studio album. Their version became their second No. 1 song on the Tropical Airplay chart in the US. DLG's version was recognized as one of the best-performing songs of the year at the 1997 ASCAP Latin Awards on the tropical field.

== See also ==
- List of Billboard Tropical Airplay number ones of 1996
