= Carolina la O =

Carolina La O
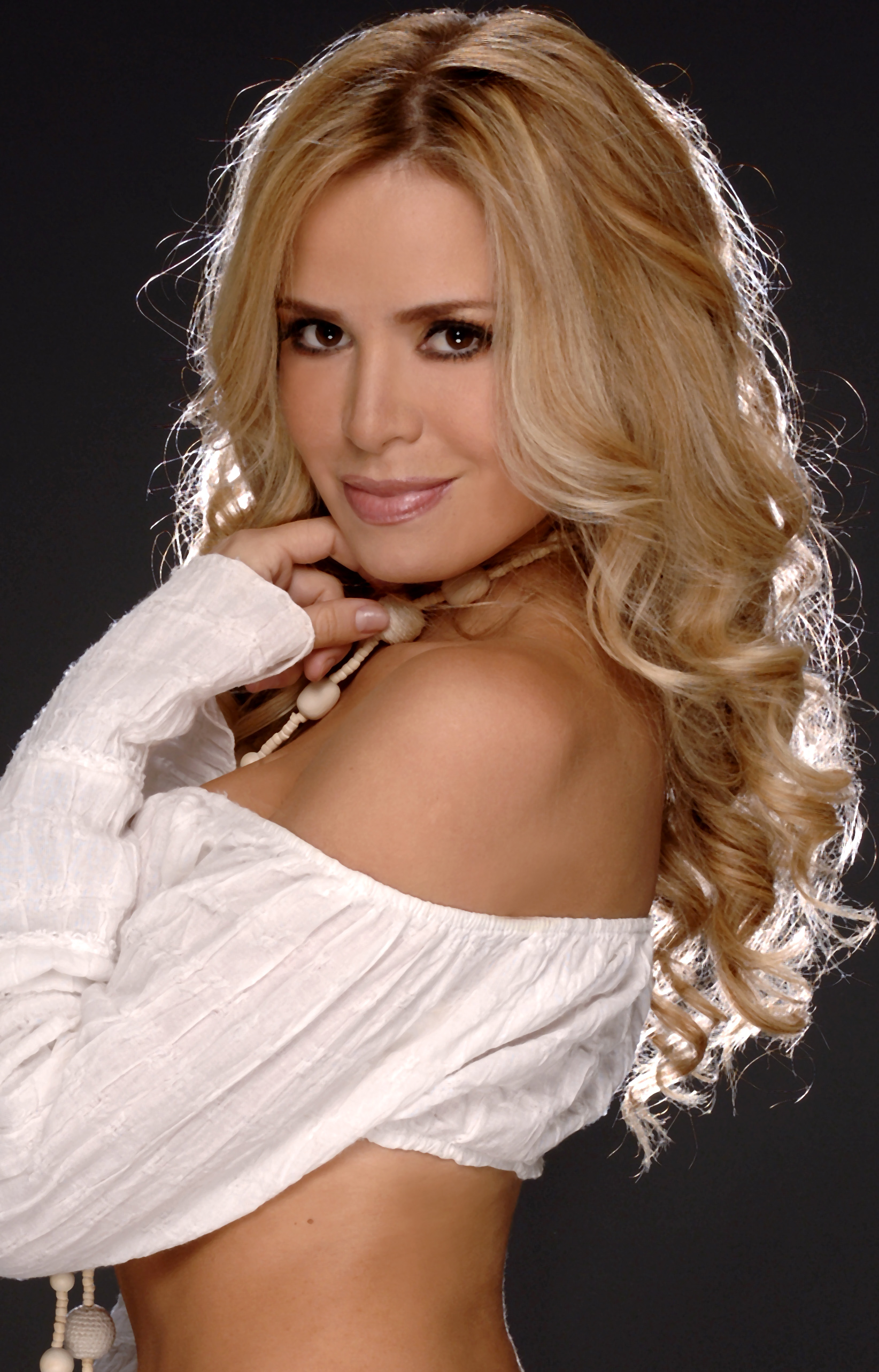

Background information
- Born: Carolina Ovalle Arango; April 12, 1975 (age 51); Manizales, Caldas, Colombia
- Origin: Colombia
- Genres: Tropical music; salsa music
- Occupations: Singer; songwriter
- Instrument: Vocals
- Years active: 1995–present
- Labels: Warner Music Group / WEA Latina (1999–2005); DG Music / Universal Music Group (2006–2008); Peer Music (2008–present) / Codiscos (2016–present)
- Website: www.carolinalao.com

Carolina Ovalle Arango, known to fans as "Carolina La O" (born April 12, 1975 Manizales, Colombia), is a Colombian salsa and tropical music singer. Carolina la O made her live debut at the age of six, singing a traditional song called "Campesina Santandereana" at her elementary school. She later graduated from a local university with a degree in management.

== Biography ==
=== Early years ===
In the late 1990s, Carolina joined the Colombian tropical salsa/cumbia group Alquimia la Sonora del XXI. This Sonora Matancera tribute band were popular in Latin America with their version of the earlier Cuban group's hits. Carolina la O demonstrated her considerable vocal abilities, which took her around the world and earned her popularity and critical respect. On February 14, 1998, the young artist had the opportunity to play at New York's Copacabana, performing along with salsa star Celia Cruz.

=== Carolina la O ===
In 1999, she ventured out as a solo artist with her album El Son de Ahora, with a rhythm similar to the work she did while in Alquimia and a style of her own.

In 2001 la O returned with the release of her second solo album. Dulce Veneno's titular first single attempts to prove her among the best in her genre. The album was filled out by remixes of the same song in ranchera, ballad, and the original salsa romantica format. Though not as strong as her first solo effort, it also contains the stand-out song "Sabe a Chocolate."

In 2002, she released her third album, Carolina, produced by Kike Santander. That same year, Budweiser (Anheuser-Busch) picked Carolina as their Latin spokesperson. In 2004, Carolina continued her success when asked to join a popular Latin American reality TV series, Telemundo's Protagonistas de la Fama VIP.

In 2006, Carolina la O returned with a fresh sensual look to complement her new album De Mi Fuego. The album contains 11 songs, and is a fusion of the Caribbean, Colombian, and tropical music sounds. "Contigo" was the first promo single, a mix of Colombian cumbia and modern tropical rhythms.

In 2009, she came out with Reencuentro con los Gemelos. The resurgence of salsa has been credited to a few great albums by such groups as Spanish Harlem Orchestra, Bobby Valentín, and Oscar D'León. These albums showcased the avant-garde aspect of this music prevalent in the '70s. Reencuentro focused on that other side of '70s salsa, salsa matancera, in what was hoped would bring modern dancers back to the era of Johnny Pacheco, Celia Cruz, Tipica ’73, and Ismael Rivera and his Cachimbos. After ten years of developing solo careers, the three soneros from Alquimia, Carolina la O and the twins Jorge and Sady Ramirez, reunited. Rencuentro was meant not to rehash old material, but to create a new sound without losing the essence of their peak period together. With eclectic material ranging from songs once performed by Trio Matamoros, Celia Cruz, Oscar D’Leon, Héctor Lavoe, and even Marc Anthony, the album attempts to bring everything together with a cohesive group sound. Among the album's songs are "Llegó el Sabor," "Cúcala," "Hueso Na Ma," "Azucar Negra," and the album's first single, "El Último Beso".

With two nominations for Female Tropical Artist of the Year 2010 at the Premio Lo Nuestro and Billboard Awards for Latin Music, Carolina la O marked another return and the 15 years of her career with the live album Carolina la O En Vivo. It was recorded during her performance at the Metropol Theater in Bogotá, Colombia, at the end of the year prior to its release. The album attempts to collect the best of her music in a dual CD/DVD package that features her playing the most representative songs of her artistic career.

== Awards and nominations ==
=== Premio Lo Nuestro ===
La O was nominated for two Premio Lo Nuestro Awards, aired on Univisión in 2002 and 2010. In 2002, she was nominated for Female Artist of the Year in the tropical genre. In 2010, she was again nominated for Tropical Female Artist of the Year.

=== Billboard Latin Music Awards ===
Carolina la O received two Billboard Latin Music Award nominations for Tropical Female Artist of the Year for her album Dulce Veneno in 2002. In 2010, she was again nominated for Tropical Female Artist of the Year. The awards aired on Telemundo.

In 2010, the Colombian singer remained a leader at or near the top of pop charts, ranking #5 in the U.S. overall, #1 in Puerto Rico, and #1 in Venezuela, Ecuador and Peru for "Qué Queda de Este Amor" and "El Último Beso," songs that also appear on her album Carolina la O En Vivo. She returned to her native Colombia on the hospital ship Comfort as a member of the humanitarian mission an American squadron held in the town of Coveñas and surrounding communities in August of that same year. She performed on board the ship for its crew of nearly 900, and in the main square of the town, both times accompanied by the U.S. Air Force Band and some of her group's original members, for over 5,000 attendees.

In October 2010, Carolina la O was part of the tribute album Salsa: A Tribute to El Gran Combo, recorded in commemoration of the nearly 50-year career of El Gran Combo, a band that is effectively an institution in salsa music. For the album, she recorded the song "El Menú" with Edgar Daniel and NG-2, accompanied by Roselyn Pabón, the Puerto Rico Conservatory of Music's Symphony Orchestra, and its musical director Isidro Infante on piano.

La O concluded the year with her second consecutive nomination as Tropical Female Artist of the Year at the Premios Lo Nuestro 2011.

== Discography ==
=== Studio albums ===
Year	Title
1999	El Son de Ahora: 1st Studio Album; Released: 1999
2001	Dulce Veneno: 2nd Studio Album; Released: 2001
2002	Carolina: 3rd Studio Album; Released: 2002
2006	De Mi Fuego: 4th Studio Album; Released: 2006
2009	Reencuentro con Los Gemelos: 5th Studio Album; Released: 2009

=== Live DVD albums ===
Year	Title
2010	Carolina la O en Vivo: 1st Live Album; Released: 2010

=== Singles ===
Year	Title
1999	El Son de Ahora: Yo soy la Rumba
2001	Dulce Veneno: Dulce Veneno
2002	Carolina: Prefiero estar Sola
2006	De Mi Fuego: Contigo; Dime Dime
2009	Reencuentro con Los Gemelos: Azucar Negra
2010	Carolina la O en Vivo: El Ultimo Beso; Que queda de este Amor

== Filmography ==
- 2004: cast of Protagonistas de la Fama reality TV series, for Telemundo USA
- 2007-2011: guest host of Escandalo TV, for Telefutura USA
- 2013: band leader of the group A Puro Tango on La Pista song and dance competition series, for Caracol TV
- 2013: panel of judges on Sabado Gigante for Univision
