= Por Amar Se Da Todo =

1996 single by Marc Anthony

Song by Danny Rivera

from the album Danny
- Released: 1983
- Genre: Latin pop
- Length: 3:52
- Label: Rodven
- Songwriter: Salako

"Por Amar Se Da Todo" ("For Love Gives Everything") is a song written by Salako and performed by Puerto Rican singer Danny Rivera on his studio album Danny (also released as the same title of the song) in 1983. The song was later covered by American salsa singer Marc Anthony on his third studio Todo a Su Tiempo. Marc Anthony's version became his seventh #1 song on the Billboard Tropical Airplay chart. "Por Amar Se Da Todo" was recognized at the 1998 BMI Latin Awards as one of the best performing songs of the year.

== See also ==
- List of Billboard Tropical Airplay number ones of 1996
