= Cara de Niño =

Studio album by Jerry Rivera
- Released: October 26, 1993
- Recorded: 1992–93
- Genre: Salsa
- Label: Sony Discos

Jerry Rivera chronology
Cuenta Conmigo (1992)	Cara de Niño (1993)	Lo Nuevo y lo Mejor (1994)

Singles from Cara de Niño
- 1. "Que Hay de Malo" Released: 1993; 2. "Cara de Niño" Released: 1993; 3. "Dia y Noche Pienso en Ella" Released: 1994; 4. "No Hieras Mi Vida" Released: 1994

Cara de Niño (Baby Face) is Jerry Rivera's fourth studio album. The album was nominated at the 37th Grammy Awards for Best Tropical Latin Album. The lead single, Que Hay de Malo, became Rivera's first single to reach on the top ten peaking at number-four.

== Track listing ==
1. Solo Tu
2. Que Hay de Malo
3. Cara de Niño
4. No Hieras Mi Vida
5. Dia y Noche Pienso
6. En Las Nubes
7. No Me Puedes Dejar Asi
8. Deseo Loco
9. Para Ti
10. Por Tenerte

== Personnel ==
- Executive Producer - Angel Carrasco
- Percussion - Chago Martínez
- Background Vocals - Chegüin Ramos
- Trumpet - Cusi Castillo
- Arranger, Mixing, Producer, Trombone, Background Vocals - Cutto Soto
- Composer - D.R.
- Composer - David Foster
- Trumpet - Eddie Feijo
- Trumpet - Eddie Feijoó
- Arranger - Edwin Rivera
- Arranger, Director, Vocal Arrangement - Edwin Rodriguez
- Composer - Erick Lerys
- Engineer - Francisco "Kinko" Hurtado
- Engineer - Francisco Hurtado
- Assistant, Assistant Engineer - Félix Escalera
- Trombone - Gamalier González
- Congas - Georgie Padilla
- Composer - Gustavo Márquez
- Composer - Henry Garcia
- Lead Vocals, Percussion, Primary Artist, Vocals - Jerry Rivera
- Composer - Jimmy Pankow
- Composer - Luis Angel
- Trumpet - Luis Aquino
- Engineer - Luis Berrios
- Trombone - Lutty Maldonado
- Artwork, Design - Mario Houben
- Composer - Mary Lauret
- Guitar - Maximo Torres
- Composer - Omar Alfanno
- Trombone - Oscar Pastrana
- Bass - Pedro Pérez
- Background Vocals - Pichi Perez
- Timbales - Rafael "Tito" DeGracia
- Concept, Photography - Rafi Claudio
- Composer - Raiza Reinoso
- Composer - Raldy Vázquez
- Arranger, Keyboards - Ramón Sánchez
- Composer - Roberto Lugo
- Arranger - Roberto Perez
- Guest Artist - Roberto Roena
- Director, Background Vocals - Sonny Hernandez
- Timbales - Tito de Gracia
- Arranger - Tito Rivera
- Engineer, Mixing, Vocal Arrangement, Vocals, Background Vocals - Victor "Sonny" Hernandez

== Chart position ==
Album

Year	Chart	Album	Peak
1993	Billboard Tropical/Salsa	Cara de Niño	2
1993	Billboard Top Latin Albums	Cara de Niño	3

Singles

Year	Chart	Single	Peak
1993	Billboard Hot Latin Tracks	Que Hay de Malo	4
1994	Billboard Hot Latin Tracks	Cara de Niño	22
1994	Billboard Hot Latin Tracks	Dia y Noche Pienso en Ella	31
1994	Billboard Hot Latin Tracks	No Hieras Mi Vida	11

== Critical reception ==
Professional ratings
Review scores
Source	Rating
Allmusic	4.5/5 stars

Allmusic gave the album a 4.5 out of 5 cites the album as one of his finest albums produced.

== Certification ==
Region	Certification	Certified units/sales
United States (RIAA)	3× Platinum (Latin)	300,000^{^}
^{^} Shipments figures based on certification alone.
