= Victor Manuelle (album) =

Víctor Manuelle

Studio album by Víctor Manuelle
- Released: January 23, 1996
- Genre: Salsa
- Length: 41:58
- Label: Sony Discos
- Producer: Sergio George

Víctor Manuelle chronology
Solo Contigo (1994)	Víctor Manuelle (1996)	A Pesar de Todo (1997)

Singles from Víctor Manuelle
- 1. "Hay Que Poner el Alma" Released: 1996; 2. "Pensamiento y Palabra" Released: 1996; 3. "Todo Quedó, Quedó" Released: 1996; 4. "Volverás" Released: 1997; 5. "Como Una Estrella" Released: 1997

Professional ratings
Review scores
Source	Rating
Allmusic	4/5 stars

Víctor Manuelle is the third studio album by Puerto Rican salsero Víctor Manuelle. Released in 1996, Víctor Manuelle was the first successful album by the artist to chart including one single that reached in the top ten in the Hot Latin Tracks.

== Background ==
Víctor Manuelle first started his recording career with the release of Justo a Tiempo... (Just in the Time...), which was produced by his protógé, Gilberto Santa Rosa. Despite this, the album did not the chart and the lead single Me Dará el Consentimiento (She Will Give the Consent) only peaked #21 on the Hot Latin Tracks. The follow-up album, Solo Contigo (Only with you), again did not chart on Billboard. However, the lead single Apiadate de Mi (Pity me) was more successful than the previous singles and reached #16 on the Hot Latin Tracks and #3 on the Latin Tropical Airplay chart. With the release of the eponymous album, the album was the first to chart in the Top Latin Albums and Tropical Albums chart. The lead single, Hay Que Poner el Alma also achieved the Top Ten on Hot Latin Tracks peaking at number-six.

== Track listing ==
1. Pensamiento y Palabra - 4:50
2. Hay Que Poner el Alma - 5:06
3. Ahora Me Toca a Mi - 6:06
4. La Razón de Mi Vida - 5:05
5. Volverás - 5:27
6. Todo Quedó, Quedó - 5:06
7. Como Una Estrella - 4:49
8. Sin Querer Queriendo - 5:29

== Charts ==
Chart (1996–1997)	Peak position
US Top Latin Albums (Billboard)	42
US Tropical Albums (Billboard)	8

== Sales and certifications ==
Region	Certification	Certified units/sales
United States (RIAA)	2× Platinum (Latin)	200,000^{^}
^{^} Shipments figures based on certification alone.
