= Fresco (Jerry Rivera album) =

Studio album by Jerry Rivera
- Released: August 20, 1996
- Recorded: 1995–96
- Genre: Salsa
- Length: 45:38
- Label: Sony Discos
- Producer: Sergio George, Cuto Soto

Jerry Rivera chronology
Magia (1995)	Fresco (1996)	Ya No Soy el Niño Aquel (1997)

Singles from Fresco
- 1. "Suave" Released: April 1996; 2. "Loco de Amor" Released: September 1996; 3. "Una y Mil Veces" Released: 1996; 4. "Lloraré" Released: February 1997; 5. "Te Recordaré" Released: 1997; 6. "Fresco" Released: 1997

Professional ratings
Review scores
Source	Rating
Allmusic	4/5 stars

Fresco is the sixth studio album recorded by Puerto Rican salsa singer Jerry Rivera released on August 20, 1996. The album received Grammy and Lo Nuestro nominations for Best Tropical Latin Album. The single "Loco de Amor" won a Tropical Award for the songwriter.

== Track listing ==
This information adapted from Allmusic.

No.	Title	Writer(s)	Length
1.	"Loco de Amor"	Mary Lauret	4:39
2.	"Una y Mil Veces"	Donato Poveda	5:03
3.	"Desde Que Tu No Estas"	Alejandro Vezzani	4:07
4.	"Sí, Soy un Muchacho Malo"	Lolita de la Colina	4:51
5.	"Digo Tu Nombre"	Eric Leris, Raiza Reynoso	4:34
6.	"Te Recordaré"	Manuel Lopez, Rubby Perez, Rudy Pérez	4:51
7.	"Fresco"	Manny Benito	4:29
8.	"Lloraré"	Fernando Osorio	4:25
9.	"Linda Fantasía"	Mary Lauret	4:10
10.	"Suave"	Orlando Castro, Kiko Cibrian	4:29

== Chart performance ==
Chart (1996)	Peak position
U.S. Billboard Top Latin Albums	14
U.S. Billboard Tropical Albums	2

== Certification ==
Region	Certification	Certified units/sales
United States (RIAA)	Platinum (Latin)	100,000^{^}
^{^} Shipments figures based on certification alone.
