= Abriendo Puertas (Jerry Rivera album) =

1990 studio album by Jerry Rivera

Studio album by Jerry Rivera
- Released: September 25, 1990
- Recorded: 1989–90
- Genre: Salsa
- Length: 38:11
- Label: CBS Discos
- Producer: Carlos "Cuto" Soto

Jerry Rivera chronology
Empezando a Vivir (1989)	Abriendo Puertas (1990)	Cuenta Conmigo (1992)

Singles from Abriendo Puertas
- 1. "Esa Niña" Released: 1990; 2. "Dime" Released: May 1991; 3. "Nada Sin Ti" Released: 1991; 4. "Más Que Tú" Released: September 1991

Abriendo Puertas (Opening Doors) is the second studio album released by Puerto Rican singer Jerry Rivera in early 1990. The two singles from the album, "Dime" and "Más Que Tú" charted on the Billboard Latin Songs chart. The album was considered responsible in bringing a younger audience to the salsa market and reached number-one on the Billboard Tropical Albums.

== Background ==
When Jerry Rivera was fourteen, he sent a demo tape to CBS Discos under the suggestion of his father. This led to Rivera signing a contract with the record label and recorded his first album Empezando a Vivir. The lead single, "De La Cabeza a los Pies" ("From Head to Toe"), received airplay in Puerto Rico and was included in the salsa compilation album, Non-Stop Dancing, Vol. 2.

== Music ==
The album includes eight tracks, most of them being covers of songs previously recorded by several performers. The lead track, "Esa Niña" ("That Girl"), is a cover of Luis Miguel's song from his album, Busca Una Mujer. A music video was made for the song. "Dime" ("Tell Me") was written by Jorge Luis Piloto who also wrote "Como un Milagro" ("Like a Miracle") and "Más Que Tú" ("More Than You"). "Nada Sin Ti" ("Nothing Without You") is a cover of Eros Ramazzotti's song which received airplay. "Para Amarnos Mas" ("To Love Each Other More") is a cover of Manuel Mijares's song. Two singles from the album charted on the Billboard Latin Songs chart. "Dime" peaked at #26 while "Mas Que Tu" peaked at #35.

== Critical reception ==
Professional ratings
Review scores
Source	Rating
Allmusic	4/5 stars

José Estévez Jr. of Allmusic gave the album a four star rating, citing the album as "one of salsa's most commercially successful acts in history." He noted songs such as "Esa Niña", "Dime", and "Nada Sin Ti" as bringing a younger audience to the salsa market. Abriendo Puertas received a nomination for "Tropical Album of the Year" at the Lo Nuestro Awards of 1992.

== Track listing ==
No.	Title	Writer(s)	Length
1.	"Dime"	Jorge Luis Borrego, Jorge Luis Piloto	4:47
2.	"Esa Niña"	Juan Carlos Calderón	5:04
3.	"Nada Sin Ti"	Eros Ramazzotti	4:34
4.	"Como Un Milagro"	Jorge Luis Piloto	4:48
5.	"Más Que Tú"	Jorge Luis Piloto	4:59
6.	"Para Amarnos Más"	Nilson-Posse, Adrian Posse	4:34
7.	"El Mojillo del Cañaveral"	Axel Martinez	4:41
8.	"Tal Vez"	Axel Orlando Perez	5:17

== Chart performance ==
=== Album ===
Chart (1991)	Peak position
U.S. Billboard Tropical Albums	1

== Certification ==
Region	Certification	Certified units/sales
United States (RIAA)	Platinum (Latin)	100,000^{^}
^{^} Shipments figures based on certification alone.

== See also ==
- List of number-one Billboard Tropical Albums from the 1990s
