= Los Terrícolas =

Venezuelan pop music group

- Origin: Morón, Carabobo, Venezuela
- Genres: Ballad, Pop, Romantic
- Years active: 1968 - 1979
- Label: Discomoda
- Members: Johnny Hoyer; Lenny Beatriz Hoyer; Nestor Daniel Hoyer; Angel David Hoyer; Freddy Fuentes; Efrain Zambrano; Angel Zambrano

Los Terrícolas was a Venezuelan pop music group. American music critic Craig Harris has called them "one of Venezuela's top dance bands".

The group's name means "The Earthlings" in Spanish. They formed in the early 1970s in Morón, Carabobo, built around three siblings: Johnny, David, and Lenny Beatriz Hoyer. Also a member is lead singer Nestor Daniel. Among their early hits in the mid-1970s were "Vivirás" (You will live) (a hit in Ecuador), "Te juro que te amo" (I swear that I love you) (a hit in Mexico), and "Luto en mi alma" (Mourning in my soul) (a hit across Latin America). Following their rise to fame, they toured throughout South America, Central America, Mexico, Puerto Rico and the United States. Their songs, "Hasta Ayer" and "Volverás", have been covered by salsa singers Marc Anthony and Víctor Manuelle, respectively.

The ensemble has had two hit records in the U.S.; a 1991 greatest hits compilation, 20 Grandes Exitos, reached #9 on the Billboard Regional Mexican charts, and The 2002 live disc En Concierto hit #11 on the Latin Pop chart and #27 on the Top Latin Albums chart.
