= L'Aurora =

Single by Eros Ramazzotti

from the album Dove c'è musica
- Language: Italian
- Released: February 1997
- Recorded: 1996
- Genre: Pop rock
- Length: 4:24
- Label: BMG Ricordi
- Songwriters: Eros Ramazzotti; Adelio Cogliati
- Producer: Ramazzotti

Eros Ramazzotti singles chronology
"Dove c'è musica" (1996)	"L'Aurora" (1997)	"Quanto amore se" (1997)

Music video
- "L'Aurora" on YouTube

"L'Aurora" (English: "The Aurora"), also known by its Spanish name "La Aurora", is a song by Eros Ramazzotti, released in February 1997 through BMG Ricordi as the third single from his seventh studio album Dove c'è musica. In 2025 Ramazzoti re-recorded the song with vocal contribution by American singer Alicia Keys for his sixteenth studio album Una storia importante.

== Composition ==
Eros Ramazzotti dedicated "L'Aurora" to his daughter, named Aurora, who was born in the same year the song was released and was born from his relationship with Swiss and Italian television presenter Michelle Hunziker.

In the lyrics of the song, inspired by the joy of the birth of his first child, Ramazzotti also expresses his hope that many things will go better for him in the future and that this will bring him the serenity he desires. The romantic musical accompaniment emphasises all the singer's concerns.

== Critical reception ==
The song is considered one of the best in Ramazzotti's discography. Stefano Landi of Corriere della Sera ranked the song third on his list of "The 10 Best Italian Songs Dedicated to Children".

== Music video ==
The music video for the single was directed by Gregg Masuak. The Spanish version of the video won the Lo Nuestro Award for Video of the Year in 1997.

== Duet version with Alicia Keys ==
"L'Aurora"

Single by Eros Ramazzotti and Alicia Keys

from the album Una storia importante
- Language: Italian; Spanish; English
- Released: 21 November 2025
- Length: 5:09
- Label: Sony
- Songwriters: Eros Ramazzotti; Adelio Cogliati
- Producers: Ramazzotti; Alicia Keys

Eros Ramazzotti singles chronology
"Il mio giorno preferito" (2025)	"L'Aurora" (2025)

Alicia Keys singles chronology
"Finally" (2024)	"L'Aurora" (2025)

Music video
- "L'Aurora" on YouTube

On 21 November 2025, a re-recorded duet version of "L'Aurora" by Ramazzotti and American singer Alicia Keys was published through Sony Music, as the second single from Ramazzotti sixteenth studio album Una storia importante. It figured the second singles by Keys featuring an Italian singer since "I Will Pray (Pregherò)" with Giorgia in 2013.

=== Background and recording ===
After Ramazzotti announced the publicashion of his sixteenth studio album Una storia importante, he announced the re-recording of some tracks from his past discography, including "L'Aurora". On 13 November 2025 he announced the vocal collaboration with Alicia Keys on the song. The song was recorded at Keys house in San Diego, California. At a press conference, Keys express her decision to collaborate with Ramazzotti:

"I love this song so much, it moved me, because it is dedicated to you, describing the love you feel for a child, something I know well. It's a genuine celebration of love and life, and it was wonderful to sing it with Eros. We had an immediate rapport, even though the air conditioning was broken at my house in San Diego. Better for the voice!"

== Release history ==
Region	Date	Format(s)	Version	Label(s)	Ref.
Various	February, 1998	CD	Original	BMG Ricordi	
Various	November 21, 2025	Digital download; streaming	Duet	Sony Music	
Italy	November 21, 2025	Radio airplay	Duet	Sony Music	
