= Volverás (Los Terrícolas song) =

1996 single by Víctor Manuelle

"Hasta Ayer"

Song by Los Terrícolas

from the album Te Amaré
- B-side: "Yo"
- Released: 1973
- Genre: Latin pop
- Length: 3:52
- Label: Discolando
- Songwriter: Manny Delgado

"Volverás"

Single by Víctor Manuelle

from the album Victor Manuelle
- Language: Spanish
- Released: 1996
- Genre: Salsa
- Length: 4:40
- Label: Sony Discos
- Songwriter: Manny Delgado
- Producer: Sergio George

Víctor Manuelle singles chronology
"Pensamiento y Palabra" (1996)	"Volverás" (1996)	"Como una Estrella" (1996)

"Volverás" ("You'll Come Back") is a song written by Manny Delgado and performed by Venezuelan band Los Terrícolas from on their studio album Te Amaré (1974). In the song, the singer is certain that his lover will come back from regret. It was later covered by Puerto Rican salsa singer Víctor Manuelle on his third self-titled studio album. Manuelle's version became his second #1 song on the Billboard Tropical Airplay chart.

== See also ==
- List of Billboard Tropical Airplay number ones of 1996
