= Alquimia (band) =

Alquimia (sometimes credited as Alquimia la Sonora del XXI or, less often, Alquimia la Sonora del 21) is a Colombian salsa music band, originally a trio with female singer. They were nominated for best salsa album at Premio Lo Nuestro 1999.

== Discography ==
- Leyenda
- Tras la Huella
- Nuestro Tiempo 1999
- Fiebre Santanera 2000
- Éxitos de la Sonora Matancera
