= Tony Vega =

Puerto Rican singer (born 1957)

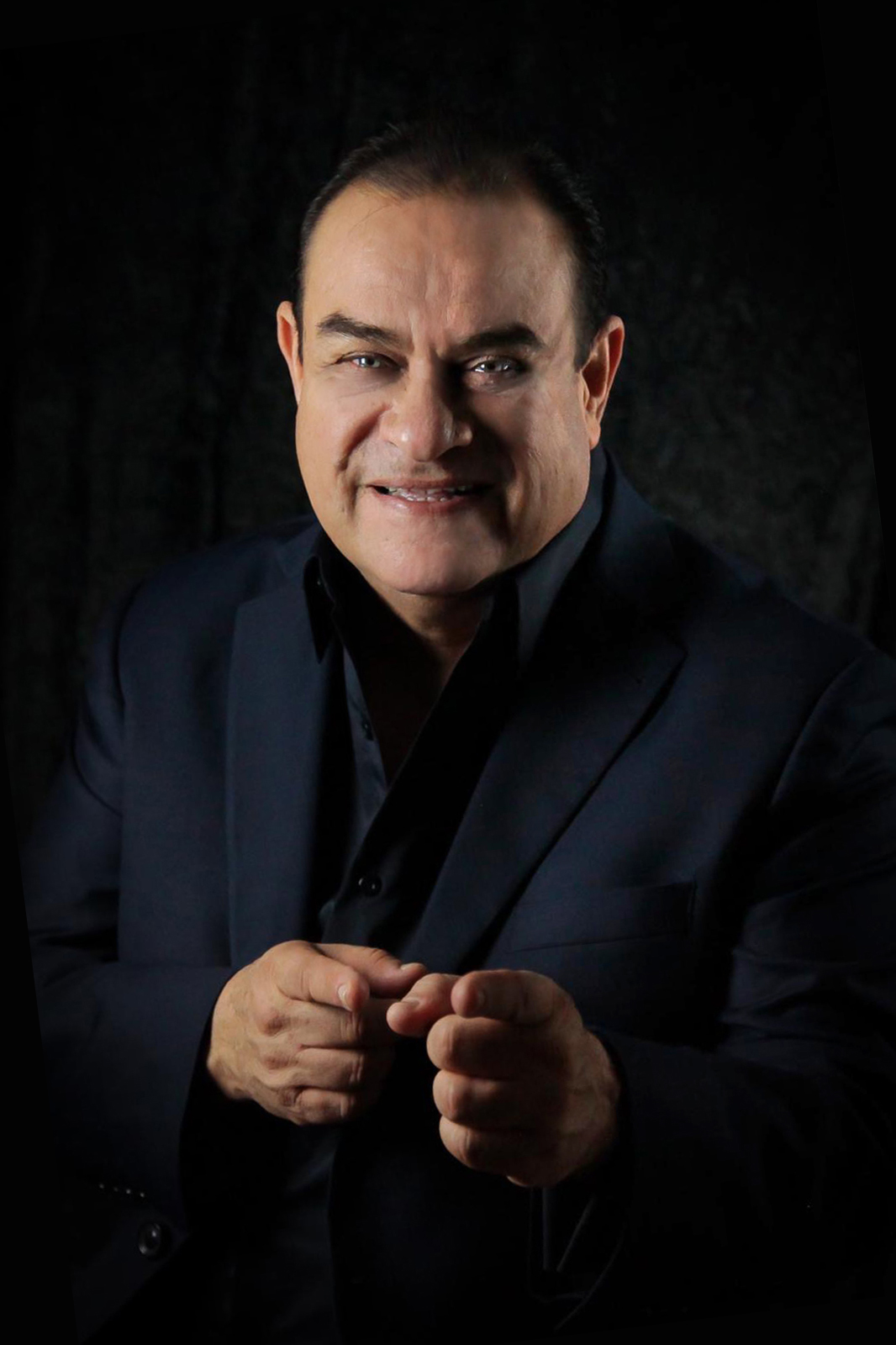
- Vega in 2020

Background information
- Born: July 13, 1957 (age 69); Salinas, Puerto Rico
- Genre: Salsa
- Occupations: Salsa singer, bandleader.
- Instruments: bongos and conga

Tony Vega Cesar (born July 13, 1957) is a Puerto Rican salsa singer.

== Early years ==
Vega was born in the town of Salinas, Puerto Rico. His family moved to Philadelphia, Pennsylvania when he was three months old, and remained there until he was 10 years old, before moving to Puerto Rico. He was born into a family of musicians so, therefore, he learned how to play the bongos and conga at an early age. In 1967, when he was 10 years old, he played the conga for a children's band called La Preferida. His family moved to New York City in 1968. In New York, Vega continued to go to school. In his free time however, he played the conga for various local Latin rock bands including City Trash.

Latin music was popular in New York during the 1970s and while Vega played the conga for Latin rock bands, he started to become more and more interested in the afroantillano style of music better known as salsa. He listened to and was influenced by Ismael Rivera, Rafael Cortijo, Rafael Ithier and El Gran Combo.

Vega started as a member of Orquesta La Preferida from 1971 to 1973. He was the primary conga player and sang on their chorus. One year when the school season ended his parents sent him on vacation to the United States for the two months of the school recess. Upon returning to Puerto Rico and back into the band, there was a replacement musician on the conga who had taken his place. It was suggested to Vega to go up front and try singing, as he had done chorus for the band quite well. Thus, his singing career was started. He remained with the band and recorded a 45 rpm record under the supervision of Pijuan (Melon Records), who was the director of Pijuan y su sexteto. He also did come chorus while a member of the Willie Rosario Orquesta with Gilberto Santa Rosa on two songs recorded by the Orquesta La Preferida for the late promotor Ruben Haddock. His voice can be heard on the CD Al fin contra viento y marea by La Preferida.

== La Selecta ==
In 1978, after he graduated from high school, Vega auditioned and was accepted by La Selecta, a well known salsa band directed by Raphy Leavitt. He sang with the band and recorded "Cosquillita" ("Tickle"), "Sheila Taina" and "El Picaflor", which became hits. In 1980, Vega was doing a show with La Selecta and in the audience was another salsa bandleader, Willie Rosario. Rosario was impressed with Vega and invited him to join his band. He did and participated in many recordings, and from 1981 to 1986, he shared credits with a young singer, Gilberto Santa Rosa. Vega also played an essential role in the recording of "La Nueva Cosecha" ("The New Harvest") which was nominated for a Grammy Award. He stayed with Rosario for eight years.

In 1986, Vega joined the Louie Ramirez band before returning to Puerto Rico. In Puerto Rico, he was introduced to Eddie Palmieri, by his friend Giovanni Hidalgo. Palmieri recorded Vega and ended up hiring him. Vega participated in the recording of La Verdad (The Truth), which won a Grammy Award for Palmieri. He traveled with the band to Spain, the Netherlands, Switzerland, Germany, Denmark, and Yugoslavia.

== Solo career ==
In 1988, Vega formed his own band and recorded "solo" for the first time. His album Yo Me Quedo! (I Will Stay) became a best seller, and appeared no the Billboard tropical/salsa chart in late 1989. He then followed that with the recording of Lo Mio es Amor (My Thing is Love), which included the songs "Ella" ("She") and an English language track "Love is Forever". This album earned him his first gold record. In 1991, Vega won a platinum record with the success of his album Uno Mismo (Oneself). That year he performed in Venezuela and later went to New York where in Madison Square Garden he participated in Tito Puentes 100th recording The Mambo King. He appeared at the New York Salsa Festival in 1989, 1990 and 1991.

== Currently ==
Among his most current productions are Si me mira a los ojos (If You Look into My Eyes), Hoy vine a Cantarte (Today I Came to Sing to You), Tropical Tribute to the Beatles (1996) and La Combinacion Perfecta (The Perfect Combination).

Vega continues to perform but, not as often as before. In 1996 he became a "born again Christian".

== Recognitions ==
In 1992, he was awarded La Husca Award in Panama and in Puerto Rico won the Agüeybaná de Oro Award for Best Orchestra of the Year. That same year Vega and his band performed in Spain, Chile, Colombia and the United States. He was also among a committee sent to Spain by the Government of Puerto Rico to represent the island when it was awarded the Prince of Asturias Award. He performed in the Sports Palace of Madrid.

In 1996, Vega participated with Marc Anthony in the opening ceremonies of the 7th Gymnastics World Championships celebrated in Puerto Rico.

== Discography ==
External audio
- You may listen to Tony Vega's "Esa mujer " here.

- Cosquilla
- Sheila Taina
- El Picaflor
- 1980 El 20 De Willie (Willie Rosario)
- Caramelito del Campo
- Busca el Ritmo
- Prohibiciones
- Como es Posible
- El Cuatro
- Yo Me Quedo
- Tu Prenda Tendida
- Nadie te Mando
- Lo mio es Amor
- Ella
- Uno Mismo
- Dame Tiempo
- Ya es tiempo de Olvidar
- Si miras a los Ojos
- Hoy vine a Cantarte
- Tropical Tribute to the Beatles
- La Combinacion Perfecta
- Tu Eres Mi Respirar
- Hoy Quiero Cantarte
- Cuestión de Fé

== See also ==
- List of Puerto Ricans

== Bibliography ==
- Donald Clarke (1998) The Penguin Encyclopedia of Popular Music, 2nd ed., p. 1335, ISBN 0-14-051370-1
