= Destino (Rey Ruiz album) =

Studio album by Rey Ruiz
- Released: August 27, 1996
- Studio: Telesound, San Juan, Puerto Rico
- Genre: Salsa
- Length: 41:34
- Language: Spanish
- Label: Sony Discos
- Producer: Elías Lopés, Jr., Rey Ruiz

Rey Ruiz chronology
En Cuerpo y Alma (1995)	Destino (1996)	Porque Es Amor (1997)

Destino (Destiny) is the title of a studio album released by Cuban salsa singer Rey Ruiz. It contains the lead single "Mienteme Otra Vez" which became a #1 hit on the Tropical Airplay chart in the US.

== Track listing ==
No.	Title	Writer(s)	Length
1.	"Miénteme Otra Vez"	Manny Benito	4:44
2.	"Aquí Estoy Yo"	Omar Alfanno	4:45
3.	"Eso Digo Yo"	Rey Ruiz; Chacín; José Valladares	4:25
4.	"Cuba y Puerto Rico"	Ruiz	4:53
5.	"Destino"	Ricardo Quijano	4:36
6.	"Saber Amar"	Reinaldo "Pachy" López	4:40
7.	"Vereda Tropical"		4:06
8.	"Luz de una Estrella"	Benito	4:57
9.	"Mañana Por la Mañana"		4:28

== Charts ==
Chart (1996)	Peak position
US Top Latin Albums (Billboard)	26
US Tropical Albums (Billboard)	5
