= Jessica Cristina =

Puerto Rican merengue artist, pop singer

- Born: December 12, 1975 (age 50)
- Origin: Santurce, Puerto Rico
- Genres: Pop; merengue
- Occupation: Singer
- Years active: 1992–present
- Labels: Sony Discos (1992–1995); BMG U.S. Latin (1996–2001); Zonido Music (2010)

Jessica Cristina (born December 12, 1975, Santurce, Puerto Rico) is a merengue artist and pop singer.

== Biography ==
She signed her first recording contract in 1992 with Sony Music and released her debut album, Aprendiendo a Querer.

The album gave Cristina two hit songs, "Cosquillas En El Corazón" and "Todo Es Vida", featuring Ricky Martin. Two years later she released her second album entitled Más Alla.

In 1996, Jessica Cristina signed with BMG and released a new album, "Me Gusta Todo de Ti", this time her music style transformed into merengue which raised her profile in the Latin music world. The album went gold, boosting her popularity further. The album contained the hit singles "Te Felicito" and "Necesito Una Persona."

In 1997, she released her next album "Natural", which was another success with Gold Certification. She released the eponymous album, "Jessica Cristina", in 1998. For this album she wrote some of her own songs. The same year, Jessica was nominated for a Lo Nuestro Award for Tropical Female Artist of the Year.

In summer 2000, Jessica Cristina released under the Home Furniture Store " Toque Rustico" her first eponymous, Mexican Style, Furniture and Accessories Collection. Jessica Cristina was the first Latinoamerican singer that released a Furniture Collection label.

Jessica Cristina released her next album "Pasional" in 2000. The return to her "roots" with the ballad "Nunca Supe Mas de Ti" and pop rock "besos", also 7 tracks in merengue.

After 10 years without recording an album, Jessica released in April 2010 the single "Me Quiero Ir" with independent label Zonido Entertainment Network and management firm VC Promotion. "Me Quiero Ir" is a romantic ballad that shows a woman in total control of her emotions. Jessica also recorded a merengue version of this song.

== Discography ==
=== Albums ===
- Aprendiendo a Querer (1992)
- Más Allá (1994)
- Me Gusta Todo de Ti (1996)
  - Certification: Gold
- Natural (1997)
  - Certification: Gold
- Jessica Cristina (1998)
- Pasional (2000)
- Me Quiero Ir – Single (2010)
- Divas Mexicanas Tributo – EP (2025)

=== EPs & Singles ===
- 1992: "Cosquillas en el Corazón" (#5 Billboard / Latin)
- 1992: "Todo Es Vida" [featuring Ricky Martin ] (#14 Billboard / Latin)
- 1994: "Te Siento"
- 1996: "Te Felicito" (#1 Billboard / Tropical)
- 1996: "Me Gusta Todo de Ti"
- 1996: "Ay Amor"
- 1996: "Necesito Una Persona" (#9 Billboard / Tropical)
- 1997: "Lo Tengo Dominao" (#15 Billboard / Tropical)
- 1997: "Y Voy a Ser Feliz"
- 1998: "Dame, Dame, Dame" (#6 Billboard / Tropical)
- 1998: "Sé Como Duele"
- 1998: "Amor Perdido"
- 2000: "Nunca Supe Más de Ti" (#21 Billboard / Latin)
- 2000: "Besos"
- 2010: "Me Quiero Ir"
