= Jerry Rivera =

Puerto Rican singer (born 1973)

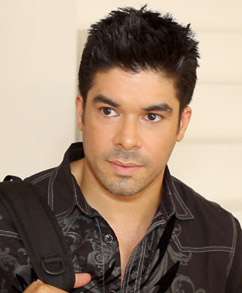

Background information
- Also known as: The baby of salsa
- Born: Gerardo Rivera Rodríguez; July 31, 1973 (age 52); Humacao, Puerto Rico
- Genres: Salsa
- Occupations: Singer; songwriter
- Years active: 1988–present
- Labels: Sony Discos (1989–2005); EMI Latin (2007); Venemusic (2011–present)

Jerry Rivera (born Gerardo Rivera Rodríguez on July 31, 1973) is a Puerto Rican salsa singer and songwriter.

== Early years ==
Rivera was born in Humacao, a town located on the eastern coast of Puerto Rico. He moved with his family to Levittown in the town of Toa Baja, where he received his primary and secondary education. His entire family consists of musicians, including tropical recording artists Edwin Rivera and younger sister Saned. Two other brothers, Ito and Jose, are professional instrumental musicians. His parents, also musicians, inspired him to become a musician and as a child he would often accompany his mother Dominga, a singer, and father Edwin, a guitarist and director of Los Barones Trio, during their shows.

In 1986, when he was 14 years old, he accompanied his father who was performing at a hotel in Isla Verde, San Juan. Frankie Ruiz, who was a guest at the hotel, appeared and sang a couple of songs with them and had his picture taken alongside Rivera. In 2003, this picture was used by Rivera to make the album cover for his tribute Canto a mi Idolo... Frankie Ruiz ('I sing to my Idol... Frankie Ruiz'), who had died in 1998.

== Singing career ==
In 1988, Tommy Olivencia heard Rivera sing alongside his father and recommended that he sing solo. When Rivera was 16, his father made a demo and presented it to the CBS music department. They signed Rivera.

Rivera began to be known as "El Bebé de la Salsa" (the baby of salsa) after recording his first album, Empezando A Vivir, . This project generated the hit, De La Cabeza A Los Pies ("From Head to Toe"). His second album, Abriendo Puertas ('Opening Doors'), produced the hit songs Esa Niña ('That Girl'), Dime ('Tell Me'), Nada Sin Ti ('Nothing Without You'), and Como un Milagro ('Like a Miracle') became number one hits first in Puerto Rico, then among the Hispanic populations in the United States and finally across Latin America.

His third album, Cuenta Conmigo ('Count on Me'), won three Platinum Record awards in the United States, Puerto Rico, Venezuela and Colombia. It became the most-sold salsa album in history, a record previously held by Willie Colón, and held the number-one spot in the Latin American Billboards for three consecutive months. Its hit songs included the Cuenta Conmigo, Me Estoy Enamorando ('I'm Falling in Love') and Casi Un Hechizo (Nearly A Charm). The number one hit for the album was Amores Como El Nuestro (written by Panamanian songwriter Omar Alfanno) (Love like ours) which is considered by some to be the best song by Rivera. Rivera was awarded two Premio Lo Nuestro Awards for "Singer of the Year" and "Album of the Year" and Sony Records presented him with three Crystal Awards.

The introduction of Amores Como El Nuestro has been sampled twice in hip hop, first by Lord Tariq & Peter Gunz, also used as the introduction for their 1997 song "Deja Vu (Uptown Baby)", and by Wyclef Jean in his 2004 song "Dance Like This" from the soundtrack of Dirty Dancing: Havana Nights which would later become the worldwide number-one 2006 hit "Hips Don't Lie" by Wyclef and Shakira. The introduction of "Amores Como El Nuestro" can also be heard on MTV's animated series Daria episode "Fair Enough' of its second season.

In 1993, he released Cara de Niño ('Baby Face') with ¿Qué Hay De Malo? ('What's Wrong About This?'), Cara de Niño, No Hieras Mi Vida as being major hits of the year. In 1994, as his popularity was rising, he released his first compilation album, Lo Nuevo y lo Mejor (The New and the Best), and contained the single hit Me Estoy Enloqueciendo Por Ti ('I'm Going Crazy For You'). The following year, "Magia" was released with the self-titled album and Ahora Estoy Solo (Now That I'm Alone) In 1996, Rivera released "Fresco" and Una y Mil Veces (One Thousand and One Times) and Lloraré (I Will Cry) were the album hits. Ya No Soy El Niño Aquel was released in 1997. In 1999, Rivera recorded De Otra Manera ('Another Way'), his first attempt at ballad music, which featured the bolero Ese (Him). Jerry sang the song with his father at the Roberto Clemente Coliseum in San Juan.

In 2000, Rivera recorded Para Siempre ('Forever'). This was his last album on Sony Latin records. In 2001, he released his self-titled album Jerry Rivera and the year after, he recorded Vuela Muy Alto (Fly High) which brought him a new fanbase all over Latin-America and the U.S., with the title track hit the top spot and the top 10 in many charts along with Herida Mortal (Mortal Wound). The following year he returned to his salsa roots and released Cantando A Mi Idolo... Frankie Ruiz ('Singing to My Idol... Frankie Ruiz'), a tribute album to one of his idol Frankie Ruiz. The album gain him a Latin Grammy nomination, made up for the poor sales of his previous ballad albums, and his major album hit was Ruiz's Mi Libertad featuring Julio Voltio .

Rivera played a small role in the movie I Like It Like That and appeared as himself in a Latin American soap opera titled Mi destino eres tu ('You are my destiny') which aired on Univision in the US during November 2005. Rivera has also appeared in various Banco Popular de Puerto Rico productions, including Al Compas de un Sentimiento (dedicated to the late Puerto Rican composer Pedro Flores) and Con la musica por Dentro. The same year, he released Ay Mi Vida (Oh My Life) which had received mixed reviews. In 2007, he released Caribe Gardel, a tribute to Argentine singer, Carlos Gardel with Gardel's Cuesta Abajo (Downhill) being one of the major salsa hits of the year. In 2011, he released El Amor Existe, with Solo Pienso En Ti being one of the major salsa hits of 2011.

Rivera has performed in Venezuela, Colombia, Honduras, Panama, the United States, Spain, Ecuador, Argentina, Peru, Mexico, Sweden, France, and Japan.

In 2011 he was one of the four judges for Idol Puerto Rico. (The Puerto Rican Version of American Idol).

=== Accident in Ecuador ===
On August 25, 2018, Rivera suffered a fall during a concert in Milagro, Ecuador, a city near Guayaquil. Rivera was performing on top of an elevator when it broke, causing him to fall underneath the concert's stage. He broke a quadriceps tendon on his right leg and was hospitalized at a nearby hospital. He later underwent surgery in the United States.

== Discography ==
External audio
- You may listen to Jerry Rivera's Cuenta Conmigo here.

=== Albums ===
- Empezando a Vivir ('Beginning to Live') (Released: 1989) Sony Music
- Abriendo Puertas ('Opening Doors') (Released: 1990)
- Cuenta Conmigo ('Count On Me') (Released: 1992)
- Cara de Niño ('Baby Face') (Released: 1993)
- Lo Nuevo y lo Mejor ('The New and the Best') (1994)
- Magia ('Magic') (Released: 1995)
- Fresco ('Fresh') (Released: 1996)
- Ya No Soy el Niño Aquel ('I'm Not That Child Anymore') (Released: 1997)
- De Otra Manera ('In Other Ways') (Released: 1999)
- Oro Salsero ('Salsa Gold') (Released: 2000)
- Historia 1 ('History 1') (Released: 2000)
- Para Siempre ('Forever') (Released: 2000)
- Rivera ('Rivera') (Released: 2001) 'also available in box set' BMG
- No Me Olvidarás ('You Won't Forget Me') (Released: 2001)
- Vuela Muy Alto ('Fly Very High') (Released: 2002)
- Canto a Mi Ídolo... Frankie Ruiz ('Singing to My Idol... Frankie Ruiz') (Released: 2003)
- Ay Mi Vida ('Oh My Life') (Released: 2005) Sony BMG
- Caribe Gardel (Released: 2007) EMI Music
- El Amor Existe ('Love Exists') (Released: 2010) VeneMusic
- Jerry Christmas (Released: 2012) Universal Latino
- Sólo para Mujeres (Released: 2014) Sony U.S. Latin

== Singles ==
| Year | Single | Chart positions | | | Album |
| Year | Single | U.S. Latin | U.S. Latin Pop | U.S. Latin Trop | Album |
|---|---|---|---|---|---|
| 1991 | "Esa Niña" | - | - | - | Abriendo Puertas |
| 1991 | "Dime" | 26 | - | - | Abriendo Puertas |
| 1991 | "Nada Sin Ti" | - | - | - | Abriendo Puertas |
| 1991 | "Mas Que Tu" | 35 | - | - | Abriendo Puertas |
| 1992 | "Casi un Hechizo" | 22 | - | - | Cuenta Conmigo |
| 1992 | "Amores Como El Nuestro" | 16 | - | - | Cuenta Conmigo |
| 1992 | "Cuenta Conmigo" | 24 | - | - | Cuenta Conmigo |
| 1993 | "Me Estoy Enamorando" | - | - | - | Cuenta Conmigo |
| 1993 | "Una en un Millón" | 22 | - | - | Cuenta Conmigo |
| 1993 | "Que Hay de Malo" | 4 | - | - | Cara de Niño |
| 1994 | "Cara de Niño" | 14 | - | - | Cara de Niño |
| 1994 | "No Hieras Mi Vida" | 11 | - | - | Cara de Niño |
| 1994 | "Dia y Noche Pienso en Ella" | 31 | - | - | Cara de Niño |
| 1994 | "Me Estoy Enloqueciendo Por Ti" | 33 | - | 2 | Lo Nuevo y Lo Mejor |
| 1995 | "Magia" | 16 | - | 2 | Magia |
| 1995 | "Ahora Que Estoy Solo" | 23 | - | 2 | Magia |
| 1996 | "Un Amor Verdadero" | - | - | 20 | Magia |
| 1996 | "Suave" | 16 | - | 1 | Fresco |
| 1996 | "Loco de Amor" | 11 | 11 | 1 | Fresco |
| 1996 | "Una y Mil Veces" | 23 | - | 1 | Fresco |
| 1997 | "Fresco" | - | - | 7 | Fresco |
| 1997 | "Lloraré" | 29 | - | 7 | Fresco |
| 1997 | "Te Recordaré" | - | - | 10 | Fresco |
| 1997 | "Ya No Soy el Niño Aquel" | 20 | 20 | 8 | Ya No Soy el Niño Aquel |
| 1997 | "El Amor Nunca Pregunta" | 27 | - | 10 | Ya No Soy el Niño Aquel |
| 1997 | "Vuela Libre" | - | - | - | Ya No Soy el Niño Aquel |
| 1998 | "Ese" | 1 | 2 | 1 | De Otra Manera |
| 1999 | "De Que Vale Ser un Rey" | 24 | 29 | 7 | De Otra Manera |
| 1999 | "Si Tu Me Faltas" | 17 | - | 3 | De Otra Manera |
| 2000 | "Amor de Novela" | - | - | 28 | Para Siempre |
| 2001 | "Quiero" | 1 | 1 | 1 | Rivera |
| 2001 | "Muero" | 13 | 12 | 7 | Rivera |
| 2001 | "No Me Olvidarás" | - | - | 18 | No Me Olvidarás |
| 2002 | "Vuela Muy Alto" | 3 | 4 | 1 | Vuela Muy Alto |
| 2003 | "Herida Mortal" | 7 | 10 | 3 | Vuela Muy Alto |
| 2003 | "Mi Libertad" (Featuring Voltio) | 20 | 28 | 1 | Canto a Mi Idolo...Frankie Ruiz |
| 2004 | "Puerto Rico" | 48 | - | 7 | Canto a Mi Idolo...Frankie Ruiz |
| 2005 | "Ay Mi Vida" | - | - | 4 | Ay Mi Vida |
| 2005 | "Rios de Dolor" | - | - | - | Ay Mi Vida |
| 2007 | "Cuesta Abajo" | 42 | - | 1 | Caribe Gardel |
| 2008 | "Yira Yira" | - | - | 25 | Caribe Gardel |
| 2009 | "Quien de Los Dos" | - | - | 2 | single release only |
| 2011 | "Solo Pienso En Ti" | 25 | - | 1 | El Amor Existe |
| 2011 | "Solo Con Un Beso" | 34 | - | 1 | El Amor Existe |
| 2012 | "El Amor Existe" | - | - | 2 | El Amor Existe |

De La Cabeza A Los Pies ("From Head To Feet").

== See also ==
- List of Puerto Ricans
