= 1999 Billboard Latin Music Awards =

6th annual Billboard Latin Music Awards

- Date: April, 1999
- Venue: Fontainebleau Hotel, Miami Beach, Florida, United States

The 6th annual Billboard Latin Music Awards which honor the most popular albums, songs, and performers in Latin music took place in Miami.

== Hot latin track artist of the year ==
- Alejandro Fernández
- Ricky Martin
- Marc Anthony
- Elvis Crespo

== Hot latin track of the year ==
- Por Mujeres Como Tú — Pepe Aguilar
- Vuelve — Ricky Martin
- Yo Nací Para Amarte — Alejandro Fernández
- No Sé Olvidar — Alejandro Fernández

== Pop ==
=== Pop album of the year, Male ===
- Vuelve — Ricky Martin
- Cosas del Amor — Enrique Iglesias
- Carlos Ponce — Carlos Ponce
- Atado a Tu Amor — Chayanne

=== Pop album of the year, female ===
- Dónde Están los Ladrones? — Shakira
- Te Acordarás de Mí — Olga Tañon
- El Color de los Sueños — Fey
- Todo El Amor — Myriam Hernández

=== Pop album of the year, duo or group ===
- 15 Años Después... — El Reencuentro
- Entrega Total — Onda Vaselina
- Ana José Nacho — Mecano
- Viento A Favor — Sentidos Opuestos

=== Pop album of the year, new artist ===
- Carlos Ponce — Carlos Ponce
- 15 Años Después... — El Reencuentro
- Entrega Total — Onda Vaselina
- Vida Loca — Francisco Céspedes

=== Pop latin track of the year ===
- Vuelve — Ricky Martin
- Lo Mejor de Mí — Cristian Castro
- No Sé Olvidar — Alejandro Fernández
- Yo Nací Para Amarte — Alejandro Fernández

== Tropical/Salsa ==
=== Tropical/salsa album of the year, male ===
- Suavemente — Elvis Crespo
- Un Segundo Sentimiento — Charlie Zaa
- Ironías — Víctor Manuelle
- Exclusivo — Toño Rosario

=== Tropical/salsa album of the year, female ===
- Vive — Milly Quezada
- Atada — Gisselle
- Con los Pies Sobre la Tierra — Melina León
- No Lo Voy a Olvidar — Brenda K. Starr

=== Tropical/salsa album of the year, duo or group ===
- Ni es lo mismo ni es igual — Juan Luis Guerra
- The Dynasty — Grupo Manía
- Los Primera — Servando & Florentino
- Yo Voy Por Ti — Karis

=== Tropical/salsa album of the year, new artist ===
- Suavemente — Elvis Crespo
- Los Primera — Servando & Florentino
- Leyenda II — Alquimia
- Lo mejor de la vida — Compay Segundo

=== Tropical/salsa latin track of the year ===
- Suavemente — Elvis Crespo
- Tu Sonrisa — Elvis Crespo
- Contra la Corriente — Marc Anthony
- Que Habría Sido de Mí — Víctor Manuelle

== Regional Mexican ==
=== Regional Mexican album of the year, male ===
- Entre El Amor Y Yo — Vicente Fernández
- Con Mariachi — Pepe Aguilar
- Puro Pueblo — Michael Salgado
- Canta A José Alfredo Jiménez — Pedro Fernández

=== Regional Mexican album of the year, female ===
- Cerca de ti — Lucero
- Arráncame A Puños — Yesenia Flores
- Robame Un Beso — Graciela Beltrán
- Instantes — Patricia Navidad

=== Regional Mexican album of the year, duo or group ===
- Como Te Recuerdo — Los Temerarios
- Amor Platónico — Los Tucanes de Tijuana
- Los Super Seven — Los Super Seven
- Confesiones De Amor — Los Ángeles Azules

=== Regional Mexican album of the year, new artist ===
- Los Super Seven — Los Super Seven
- Ayer, Hoy y Siempre...Con Amor — Los Trios
- Tu Ya Lo Conoces — Julio Preciado
- Arráncame A Puños — Yesenia Flores

=== Regional Mexican latin track of the year ===
- Por que te conocí — Los Temerarios
- Por Mujeres Como Tú — Pepe Aguilar
- Me Haces Falta Tú — Los Ángeles Azules
- Me Voy A Quitar De En Medio — Vicente Fernández

== Other awards ==
=== Latin Fusion/Alternative album of the year ===
- Ozomatli — Ozomatli
- The Album II — Alabina
- The New Sound of the Venezuelan Gozadera — Los Amigos Invisibles
- Bloque — Bloque

=== Latin rock album of the year ===
- Sin Daños a Terceros — Ricardo Arjona
- La Flaca — Jarabe de Palo
- Nek — Nek
- A Quien Le Pueda Interesar — Fiel a la Vega

=== Latin rap album of the year ===
- Aquel Que Había Muerto — Vico C
- En La Mira — Ilegales
- Aquamosh — Plastilina Mosh
- ¿Dónde Jugarán las Niñas? — Molotov

=== Contemporary Latin jazz album of the year ===
- Hot House — Arturo Sandoval
- Bele Bele en la Habana — Chucho Valdés
- Obsession — David Sánchez
- Afro-Cuban Fantasy — Poncho Sanchez

=== Latin dance club play of the year ===
- Oye! — Gloria Estefan
- No Nos Tenemos (NNT) — Proyecto Uno
- Zulu — Francisco Paz
- Suavemente — Elvis Crespo

=== Latin dance album of the year ===
- Latin Mix Usa — Various Artist
- Verano 98 — Various Artist
- Latinos In Da House, Vol 2. — Various Artist
- D.J. Latin Mix 98 — Various Artist

=== Latin dance maxi-single of the year ===
- Suavemente — Elvis Crespo
- The Cup of Life — Ricky Martin
- Oye! — Gloria Estefan
- Corazón Partío — Alejandro Sanz

=== Songwriter of the year ===
- Kike Santander
- Juan Gabriel
- Fato
- Omar Alfanno

=== Publisher of the year ===
- F.I.P.P. Music
- EMI April
- BMG Songs
- Sony Discos Music Publishing

=== Publishing corporation of the year ===
- F.I.P.P. Music
- EMI Music
- Sony/ATV Music
- Warner/Chapell Music

=== Producer of the year ===
- Emilio Estefan
- Kike Santander
- Rudy Pérez
- Pepe Aguilar

=== Spirit Of Hope ===
- Olga Tañon

=== Billboard Lifetime achievement award ===
- Flaco Jiménez

=== Billboard Latin Music Hall of Fame ===
- Rocio Durcal
