= List of Billboard Tropical Airplay number ones of 1998 =

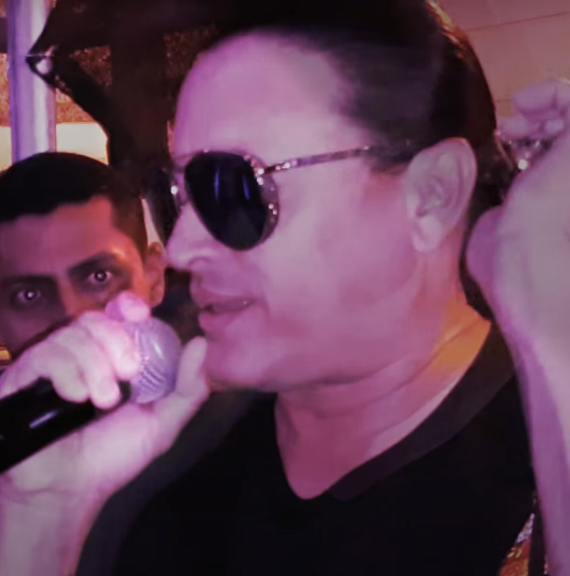
Elvis Crespo had the longest-running number-one and best-performing song of the year with his debut single "Suavemente".

Tropical Airplay is a chart published by Billboard magazine that ranks the top-performing songs (regardless of genre or language) on tropical radio stations in the United States, based on weekly airplay data compiled by Nielsen's Broadcast Data Systems (BDS). It is a subchart of Hot Latin Songs, which lists the best-performing Spanish-language songs in the country. In 1998, 15 songs topped the chart, in 50 issues of the magazine. Due to damage to the BDS monitors in Puerto Rico caused by Hurricane Georges, the Tropical Airplay chart, along with the other Latin song charts, was not published in the issues dated October 10 and October 17.

At the start of the year, Gisselle was at number one with her first chart-topper "Quiero Estar Contigo". She went on to have another number one in 1998 with a cover version of Lani Hall and Camilo Sestos's "Corazón Encadenado" with Sergio Vargas; it would be the latter artist's only number one. Víctor Manuelle had three number ones in 1998 topping the listing with "Así es la Mujer", "Se Me Rompe el Alma" and "Que Habría Sido de Mí". Following a successful stint with Grupo Manía, Elvis Crespo launched his solo career and released his debut album Suavemente (1998). The album spawned two number one singles: the title track and "Tu Sonrisa". "Suavemente" was the longest-running number one of the year with nine weeks and the best-performing tropical song of 1998. Grupo Manía themselves reached number one with "Me Miras y Te Miro". Marc Anthony was the only other artist to reach number one with more than one track in 1998 with "Contra la Corriente" and "Si Te Vas", the latter a cover version of Pedro Fernández's song.

Other acts to reach number one for the first time include Olga Tañón, Ricky Martin, Servando & Florentino, and Juan Luis Guerra. Servando & Florentino's debut single, "Una Fan Enamorada", spent a total of six weeks on top of the chart. Guerra had the final one of the year with "Mi PC" from the album Ni Es lo Mismo Ni Es Igual (1998), which marked the artist's return to the music scene after a four-year absence. Juan Manuel Lebrón (credited as Juanma y su Tuna Para Todo el Año) and Michael Stuart obtained their first and only chart-toppers in the year.

== Chart history ==
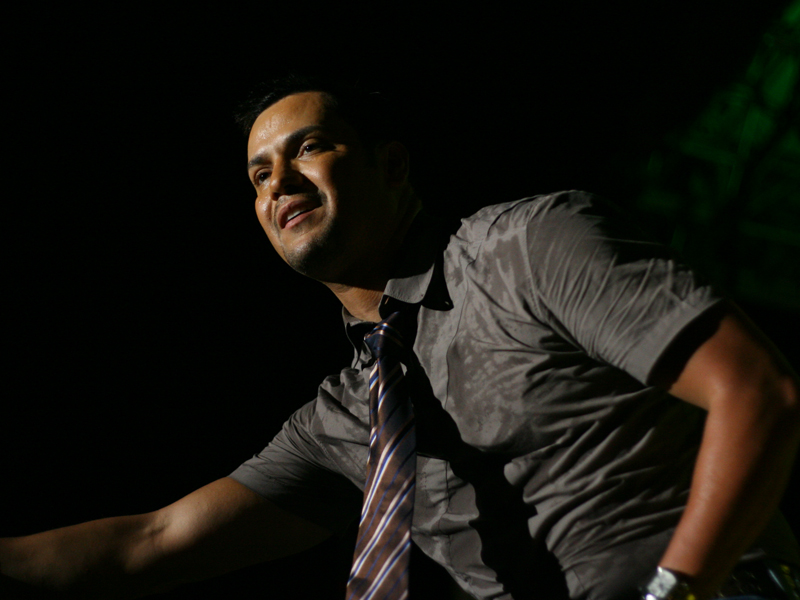
Víctor Manuelle had the most number ones of the year with three songs.

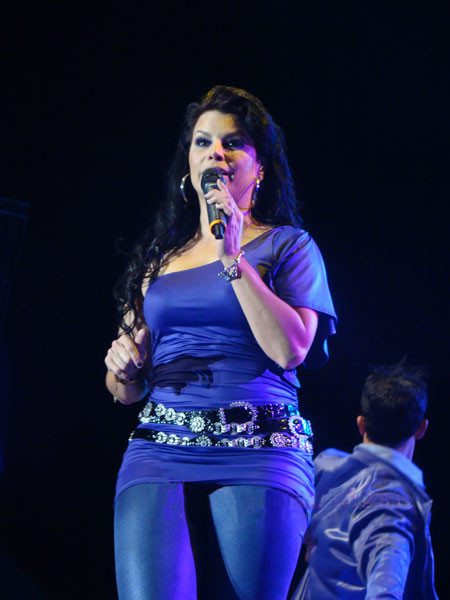
Olga Tañón achieved her first chart-topper with "El Frío de Tu Adiós"

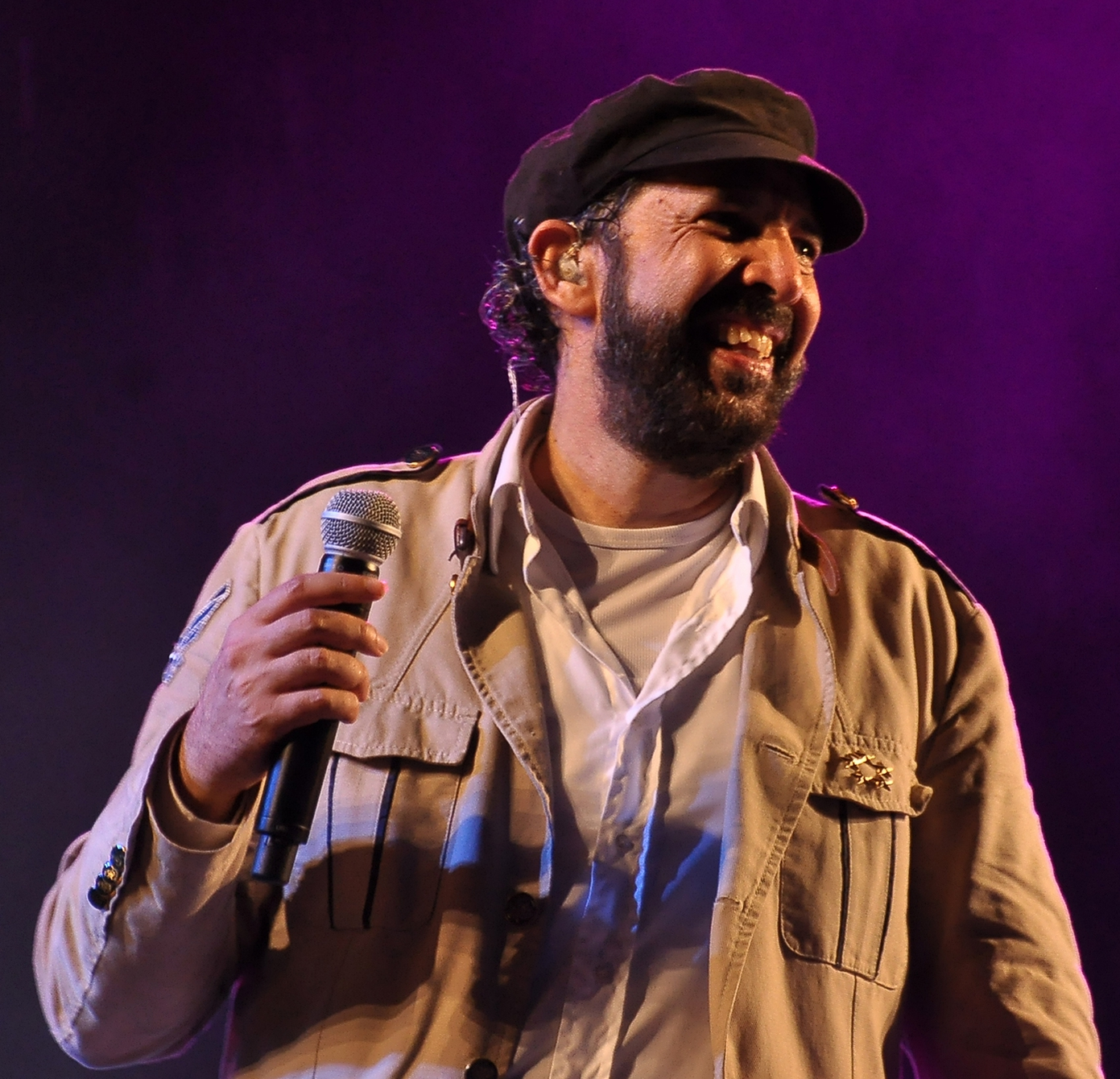
Juan Luis Guerra had the final number one of the year with "Mi PC", which also marked a comeback for the artist following a four-year hiatus.

Key
†	Indicates number 1 on Billboard's year-end tropical chart

Chart history
Issue date	Title	Artist(s)	Ref.
January 3	"Quiero Estar Contigo"	Gisselle	
January 10	"Por Dos Pulgadas"	Juanma y su Tuna Para Todo el Año	
January 17	"Me Miras y Te Miro"	Grupo Manía	
January 24	"Así es la Mujer"	Víctor Manuelle	
January 31	"Así es la Mujer"	Víctor Manuelle	
February 7	"Mi Mayor Venganza"	La India	
February 14	"El Frío de Tu Adiós"	Olga Tañón	
February 21	"Mi Mayor Venganza"	La India	
February 28	"Vuelve"	Ricky Martin	
March 7	"El Frío de Tu Adiós"	Olga Tañón	
March 14	"El Frío de Tu Adiós"	Olga Tañón	
March 21	"Si Te Vas"	Marc Anthony	
March 28	"Una Fan Enamorada"	Servando & Florentino	
April 4	"Una Fan Enamorada"	Servando & Florentino	
April 11	"Una Fan Enamorada"	Servando & Florentino	
April 18	"Una Fan Enamorada"	Servando & Florentino	
April 25	"Una Fan Enamorada"	Servando & Florentino	
May 2	"Una Fan Enamorada"	Servando & Florentino	
May 9	"Suavemente" †	Elvis Crespo	
May 16	"Suavemente" †	Elvis Crespo	
May 23	"Suavemente" †	Elvis Crespo	
May 30	"Suavemente" †	Elvis Crespo	
June 6	"Suavemente" †	Elvis Crespo	
June 13	"Suavemente" †	Elvis Crespo	
June 20	"Suavemente" †	Elvis Crespo	
June 27	"Suavemente" †	Elvis Crespo	
July 4	"Suavemente" †	Elvis Crespo	
July 11	"Se Me Rompe el Alma"	Víctor Manuelle	
July 18	"Se Me Rompe el Alma"	Víctor Manuelle	
July 25	"Se Me Rompe el Alma"	Víctor Manuelle	
August 1	"Se Me Rompe el Alma"	Víctor Manuelle	
August 8	"Tu Sonrisa"	Elvis Crespo	
August 15	"Corazón Encadenado"	Gisselle and Sergio Vargas	
August 22	"Tu Sonrisa"	Elvis Crespo	
August 29	"Tu Sonrisa"	Elvis Crespo	
September 5	"Oye!"	Gloria Estefan	
September 12	"Tu Sonrisa"	Elvis Crespo	
September 19	"Tu Sonrisa"	Elvis Crespo	
September 26	"Contra la Corriente"	Marc Anthony	
October 3	"Contra la Corriente"	Marc Anthony	
October 10	No charts published		
October 17	No charts published		
October 24	"Que Habría Sido de Mí"	Víctor Manuelle	
October 31	"Contra la Corriente"	Marc Anthony	
November 7	"Contra la Corriente"	Marc Anthony	
November 14	"Agua Pasada"	Frankie Negrón	
November 21	"Agua Pasada"	Frankie Negrón	
November 28	"Agua Pasada"	Frankie Negrón	
December 5	"Niña Bella"	Michael Stuart	
December 12	"Mi PC"	Juan Luis Guerra & 4.40	
December 19	"Mi PC"	Juan Luis Guerra & 4.40	
December 26	"Mi PC"	Juan Luis Guerra & 4.40	

== See also ==
- 1998 in Latin music
