= The Cup of Life =

1998 Ricky Martin song

Single by Ricky Martin

from the album Music of the World Cup: Allez! Ola! Ole!
- Language: Spanish; English
- B-side: "María"
- Released: March 9, 1998
- Recorded: 1998
- Genre: Samba; Latin pop
- Length: 4:27
- Label: Columbia
- Songwriters: Luis Gómez-Escolar; Desmond Child; Draco Rosa
- Producers: Desmond Child; Draco Rosa

Ricky Martin singles chronology
"Vuelve" (1998)	"The Cup of Life" (1998)	"La Bomba" (1998)

Music video
- "La copa de la vida" on YouTube "The Cup of Life" on YouTube "La copa de la vida" (Spanglish) on YouTube

Audio sample
- file; help

Alternative cover
- Cover artwork used in the United States

"The Cup of Life" (Spanish: "La Copa de la Vida") is a song recorded by Puerto Rican singer Ricky Martin. Martin created the song after FIFA requested of him an anthem. The song was written by Luis Gómez-Escolar, Desmond Child, and Draco Rosa, while the production was handled by the latter two. It was released by Columbia Records on March 9, 1998 as the official song of the 1998 FIFA World Cup held in France, and was later included in his fourth studio album, Vuelve (1998). A primarily Spanish language samba-rooted Latin pop song, it carries a football-heavy message with fully positive lyrics.

The song has received highly positive reviews from music critics, who complimented its energy and lyrics. "The Cup of Life" has been ranked as the best World Cup anthem of all time by multiple publications, including The Atlantic, Dallas Observer, and The Fader. It is also one of Martin's most commercially successful songs worldwide, appearing on the charts in more than 60 countries, and reaching number one in 30 countries. It has received several certifications, including platinum in Australia and France. The accompanying music videos were directed by Wayne Isham and filmed during a sold-out concert in Puerto Rico.

To promote the song, Martin performed it for many television programs and award shows, including the 1998 FIFA World Cup final. His performance at the 1999 Grammy Awards was greeted with a massive standing ovation and received acclaim from critics. It is known as a game-changer for Latin music worldwide, being credited as ushering in the "Latin explosion". Martin's performance of the song during the first inauguration of George W. Bush was also ranked as one of the "Best Inauguration Performances of All Time" by several sources. Multiple artists and contestants on various music talent shows have covered the song, including Carlito Olivero and Alondra Santos.

== Background and release ==
In 1995, Ricky Martin released his third studio album A Medio Vivir, and "María" was chosen as the album's second single, which became a huge success. While he was on tour and recording Vuelve in 1997, "María" caught the attention of FIFA. They contacted Martin and asked him to create a song as the 1998 FIFA World Cup anthem. "I have to admit that the challenge made me a bit nervous, but the massive growth potential for my career was such that I decided to accept." Martin wrote about the request in Me, his official autobiography. Following his acceptance, musicians K.C. Porter, Robi Rosa, and Desmond Child joined him, and they started working on "The Cup of Life". Martin wrote about the recording in Me:

From that moment on, we began to look at the album as part of a global strategy to promote Latin music worldwide, so we chose and arranged the songs with the sole mission of getting the entire globe to dance and sing in Spanish. It was a unique opportunity to introduce the charms of Latin music to the rest of the world.

The song was released by Columbia Records on March 9, 1998. Sony Music Asia released a promo CD containing three versions of "María", and "The Cup of Life". In Australia, "The Cup of Life" was released as a double A-side single with "María". "La Copa de la Vida" was included as the eighth track on Vuelve, released February 12, 1998, and its Spanglish radio edit was included as the ninth track on Martin's fifth studio album Ricky Martin, released May 11, 1999. An extended play, titled La Copa de la Vida (Remixes), was also released in 1998, which includes eight remixes of the song.

== Music and lyrics ==
Musically, "La Copa de la Vida" is a primarily Spanish language samba-rooted Latin pop song, and features elements of batucada, salsa, dance, mambo, and Europop. John Lannert from Billboard says it resonates "much closer to Brazilian grooves than to sounds emanating from Martin's place of birth - Puerto Rico". According to the song's sheet music on Musicnotes.com, "The Cup of Life" is composed in the key of C minor with a groove of 108 beats per minute. Martin's vocals span from the low note of G_{4} to the high note of Ab_{5}. Although the song is mostly in Spanish, Martin also uses a few words in English and French in the chorus.

The track was written by Spanish musician Luis Gómez-Escolar, American songwriter Desmond Child, and American musician Draco Rosa, with its production being handled by Desmond Child and Rosa. "La Copa de la Vida" runs for a total of 4 minutes and 27 seconds, and the English version is called "The Cup of Life". Leila Cobo from Billboard described it as a "high-octane party track". Throughout the song, Martin carries a "soccer-heavy" message with fully positive lyrics, including: "The cup of life, this is the one / Now is the time, don't ever stop" and "Nothing can hold you back if you really want it".

== Critical reception ==
"La Copa de la Vida" has been met with universal acclaim from music critics. Larry Flick from Billboard wrote, "Martin is put to good use on the official song of the World Cup." He also complimented Martin's "relentless energy over a salsa-spiced dance beat", describing the song as "a nifty musical souvenir from the sporting event", that gave him "another chance to court mainstream pop audiences", reasoning that "he's among the hotter heartthrobs in Latin music". Also from Billboard, Leila Cobo named it "the most emblematic and best-known World Cup anthem in modern history", saying "it's the song that set in motion the serious competition to vie for a World Cup song". She questioned, "is there really anyone in the world who hasn't shouted 'Un, dos, tres / Allez, allez, allez' at a party?" In another article, she labeled it "a brassy, Latin/global blockbuster" and described its chorus as "the most soaring, anthemic World Cup chorus ever". Additionally, she considered it "[a] mega-hit" in a 2006 article. Also from the same magazine, Kat Bein gave the track a positive review, saying that the "whistle-heavy, horn-driven hit is a must for any soccer celebration. It's more than just an official FIFA anthem, it's a classic Martin single".

Nicole Acevedo from NBC News described the track as a "world-famous mega-hit". An author of E! wrote that there was not a minute in the whole year "that the song was not played", and emphasized that "it was obviously one of the big must-do hits at parties". Luis Paez-Pumar from The Fader praised "La Copa de la Vida" for being the only song that "has mixed a soccer-heavy message with such a fun song that hits uplifting notes without being corny". Peter Vincent from The Sydney Morning Herald named the track "[a] huge bold anthem", and OneFootball's Lewis Ambrose described its chorus as "highly memorable". BuzzFeed's Jessica Lima complimented the song's "unique and catchy sound", writing: "Since the worldwide debut of 'Copa de la Vida', no other World Cup anthem has been able to compare to the energy of this song." Interview's Ernesto Macias complimented the track, calling it "an infectious anthem with a hint of Brazilian beats".

Liz Calvario‍ from Entertainment Tonight praised the song, labeling it "a sizzling summer jam". Scott Roxborough from The Hollywood Reporter wrote, "This is the song that set the musical template for World Cup anthems to come. [...] Martin got the world shimmying and shaking to 'The Cup of Life'." Writing for The Overtake, Ben Sledge gave "La Copa de la Vida" a positive review for its "catchy chorus" and "great samba style", saying it "creates a party atmosphere ripe for any World Cup". An author of BeSoccer praised Martin's "powerful vocals and spirited lyrics" in whole song that "captivated people, helping everyone sail with the fun and jubilation that the world cup brings". In his review for Pitchfork, Corban Goble wrote that if World Cup anthems someday would be "given their own textbook", "La Copa de la Vida" would be "the standard-bearer for the whole genre". He continued to admire the track for having "everything you look for in a World Cup song", and described its chorus as "giant" and "soaring". He also celebrated its lyrics "that starts with the word 'Ole!' and builds from there". Writing for O, The Oprah Magazine, Amanda Mitchell ranked the track as Martin's fourth best song on her 2019 list, and in 2020, Luca Mastinu from Optimagazine listed it as one of Martin's five greatest hits. He also acclaimed its chorus, which "still haunts us".

== Accolades ==
"La Copa de la Vida" won the award for Pop Song of the Year at the 1999 Lo Nuestro Awards, and Song of the Year at the 1999 El Premio Awards. It was also acknowledged as an award-winning song at the 1999 BMI Latin Awards, and was nominated for Latin dance maxi-single of the year at the 1999 Latin Billboard Music Awards. Billboard ranked "The Cup of Life" as the 44th greatest song of 1998. It has been ranked as the best World Cup anthem of all time by multiple publications, including The Atlantic, Dallas Observer, and The Fader.

All-times lists for "La Copa de la Vida" / "The Cup of Life"
Publication	List	Rank	Ref.
Adriana Monsalve	World Cup Songs Ranking	1	
Amazon Music	100 Greatest Latin Hits	2	
The Arizona Republic	10 Best World Cup Songs of All Time	3	
The Atlantic	The Best Songs in the History of World Cup Themes	1	
BeSoccer	7 Most Sensational FIFA World Cup Anthems and Songs of All Time	1	
Billboard	The 10 Best World Cup Songs Ever	—N/a	
Billboard	17 Best Soccer Songs	—N/a	
Bleacher Report	The 10 Greatest World Cup Songs	2	
BuzzFeed	The Top 10 World Cup Songs Of All Time	1	
Chicago Tribune	The Top 5 Best World Cup Songs	2	
El Colombiano	The Most Remembered World Cup Songs	—N/a	
El Comercio	The Songs of the World Cups that Marked Football	—N/a	
Cultura Colectiva	The Most Catchy World Football Cup Songs	1	
Cultura Colectiva	The Most Popular Song in World Cup History	1	
Dallas Observer	The 10 Best World Cup Songs of All-Time	1	
E!	Top 10 World Cup Soccer Songs	3	
Entertainment Tonight	8 World Cup Songs That Make You Wanna Kick Off Your Shoes	—N/a	
Factor Nueve	The best World Cup themes	1	
The Fader	The Best World Cup Anthems of All Time	1	
The Hollywood Reporter	The 10 Best World Cup Songs	3	
Hoy	The Top 5 Best World Cup Songs	2	
JoyTunes	The 6 Best World Cup Anthems in the Tournament's History	3	
Khel Now	The 10 Songs of the World Cup	—N/a	
MensXP.com	Top 10 Football Theme Songs	1	
La Nación	The Most Popular World Cup Songs	1	
New Statesman	The Best Football Songs	—N/a	
OneFootball	The Best FIFA World Cup Songs Ever	1	
The Overtake	The Ultimate World Cup Song Powerlist	1	
Pitchfork	The Most Memorable Songs of the World Cup	—N/a	
Red Bull	The 5 Best World Cup Songs	1	
Remezcla	The Best World Cup Songs	1	
Rojak Daily	5 Most Memorable World Cup Anthems Of All-Time	1	
Semana	The Songs That Have Made the Fans Sing in the World Cups	—N/a	
El Siglo de Torreón	The Greatest World Cup Songs	—N/a	
Soy Referee	Best Songs in World Cup History	1	
Sportskeeda	4 of the Best World Cup Songs	1	
The Sydney Morning Herald	The Best-Ever World Cup Songs	—N/a	
The Sydney Morning Herald	The seven best World Cup anthems of all time	1	
Terra	Top 5 Songs that Had a Soccer World Cup	—N/a	
TN	The Songs that Marked the World Cups	—N/a	
uDiscoverMusic	The 11 Best Football Songs of All Time	—N/a	
VBET News	The 10 Songs of the World Cup	—N/a	
La Voz del Interior	The Best World Cup Songs	—N/a	

== Commercial performance ==
Internationally, the track hit the charts in more than 60 countries, and topped the charts of 30, making it one of the most successful World Cup songs. It is also known as one of Martin's signature songs. In Australia, "The Cup of Life" spent six weeks at number one. It was the best-selling song of 1998 in Australia, and was certified platinum by the Australian Recording Industry Association (ARIA), denoting shipments of over 70,000 copies in the country. It spent four weeks at number one in Germany, where it was certified gold by the Bundesverband Musikindustrie (BVMI), denoting shipments of over 250,000 copies. The song also peaked within the top five in Austria, and peaked at number 29 in the United Kingdom.

"La Copa de la Vida" spent six weeks at number one in France, where it became Martin's second number-one hit, and was certified platinum by the Syndicat National de l'Édition Phonographique (SNEP), denoting shipments of over 500,000 copies in the country. The song also spent six weeks at number one in Sweden, where it was certified double platinum by the Grammofonleverantörernas förening (GLF), denoting shipments of over 60,000 copies. Additionally, the song topped the Ultratop Wallonia chart of Belgium as well as Switzerland's Swiss Hitparade chart, and was also a number one hit in Costa Rica, El Salvador, Italy, Nicaragua, Panama, Spain, and Venezuela. It also reached the top 10 in Honduras, Guatemala, the Netherlands, and Norway.

In the United States, "La Copa de la Vida" debuted at number 20 on Billboard's Hot Latin Tracks chart on March 28, 1998, becoming Martin's 15th entry and his 11th top-20 release on the chart. It subsequently peaked at number two on the chart on May 2, 1998, giving Martin his eighth top-10 track. On the US Billboard Hot 100 chart, "The Cup of Life" debuted at number 90 on the issue dated June 27, 1998, becoming Martin's second entry after "María". The following week, the former climbed to number 62, and originally peaked at number 60 in its fourth week on the Hot 100. However, almost one year later and after the success of "Livin' la Vida Loca", "The Cup of Life" re-entered the chart at number 95 on June 12, 1999, and reached number 45 on the chart issue dated August 7, 1999. "The Cup of Life" has since become Martin's longest-charting hit on the Hot 100, spending 34 weeks on the chart.

The song also reached number 18 on US Mainstream Top 40, number 40 on US Adult Top 40, and number 27 on US Rhythmic Top 40. On the US Maxi-Singles Sales chart, the song peaked at number four, and spent 61 weeks on the chart, becoming Martin's first top 10 and his longest-charting hit as of 2026. In January 2010, almost 12 years after the song's release, Billboard introduced a US Latin Digital Song Sales chart, and "La Copa de la Vida" debuted at number 40 on April 17, 2010, before reaching a peak of number 20 in June. It also re-entered the chart in 2012, 2014, 2015, and 2022, and although the song was released years before the digital era, it has sold over 141,000 digital copies in the US, as of January 2011. Its physical sales stand at 228,000 copies sold in the US.

== Music videos ==
A screenshot from the music video, depicting Martin singing and dancing in a concert.

The accompanying music videos were filmed at a sold-out concert in Puerto Rico, and directed by American director Wayne Isham, who had also directed the video for Martin's previous single "Vuelve". The video for "The Cup of Life" aired in April 1998, and throughout it, Martin is seen wearing a black T-shirt, performing the song energetically in front of the concert audience. Also, there was a similar visual for "La Copa de la Vida", as well as another version of the Spanish version, which consists mainly of the specified performance, but starts with Martin kicking a football to the screen while being filmed. This visual is also interspersed by added scenes of the audience singing and dancing to the song, as well as shots of different football players playing during the FIFA World Cup, which in turn are projected onto a wall while Martin sometimes poses before it.

All three music videos are available on the singer's YouTube channel. Cristal Mesa from mitú ranked "La Copa de la Vida" as Martin's eighth best music video on her 2018 list. Also, an author of Cultura Colectiva listed "The Cup of Life" among the "13 Videos to Appreciate Ricky Martin's Talent and Sickening Good Looks".

== Live performances ==
"20 years ago I was extremely fortunate to perform for the first time on the show and it undoubtedly became one of the most important and defining moments of my career. Since then, we have remained focused. Our music has evolved with the times, and there is no denying Latin music came back to the mainstream charts full force in the last two years, breaking all barriers once again. The world is listening and we are here to stay."

— Martin, 20 years after his 1999 Grammy performance.

Martin gave his first live performance of "La Copa de la Vida" for Hey Hey It's Saturday on June 4, 1998. On July 12, 1998, he performed it as the official anthem at the 1998 FIFA World Cup Final in France, in front of more than a billion TV viewers around the world. Fabian Holt describes it as a "global moment for Latin pop" in his book Genre in popular music. Although Latin music was not important to the Recording Academy or the mainstream music industry at the time, Tommy Mottola, then-chief of Columbia Records, was certain about Martin's stardom and pushed hard to have him on the Grammy Awards ceremony. During an interview with Billboard, Mottola told the magazine about it: "There was tremendous resistance from the Grammys. They did not want an 'unknown' to perform, yet we he had already sold 10 million copies of Vuelve worldwide. To me, that was absolutely UNACCEPTABLE."

Finally, on February 24, 1999, cavorting with a 15-piece band alongside and a large number of dancers and percussionists, Martin performed a bilingual version of "La Copa de La Vida" at the 41st Annual Grammy Awards, which was greeted with a massive standing ovation and met with acclaim from music critics. Rosie O'Donnell, who hosted the show, said: "I never knew of him before tonight. But I’m enjoying him soooooo much." Billboard's Marjua Estevez described the performance as "the most memorable Latin performance at a Grammy Awards show", and the publication ranked it as the 54th Greatest Award Show Performance of All Time on their 2017 list. The performance was additionally placed on a 2017 unranked list of "Top 20 Best Grammy Performances of All Time" by Gold Derby, and on a 2019 list of "The Most Unforgettable Grammys Performances of All Time" by InStyle. In 2022, Rolling Stone ranked it as the 15th Greatest Grammy Performance of All Time, as the only Latin performance on the list. The magazine praised Martin's "enough energy and sex and showmanship" that "melt the room" and labeled the performance "a huge moment for the history of Latin pop in the USA", naming it "easily the biggest star-making moment in Grammy history". They added that "nobody ever forgot his name after this". Crystal Larsen from the Recording Academy described the rendition as colorful, and Frank Tortorici from MTV described it as electrifying. J. Freedom du Lac from The Sacramento Bee called it "magical". NPR staff labeled it "the most memorable part of" the ceremony and described it as "electric". Martin was also nominated for Best Host or Performer of a Variety, Musical or Comedy Special at the 1999 OFTA Television Awards.

Besides the 1999 Grammy Awards, Martin performed the song at many live shows, including the MTV Asia Awards, the 1998 Festivalbar, and the halftime show at the Dallas Cowboys-New England Patriots football game at the Estadio Azteca in Mexico City. On May 29, 1999, he performed "Livin' la Vida Loca" and "The Cup of Life" on Bingolotto TV Show. On January 20, 2001, during the first inauguration of George W. Bush, Martin performed "The Cup of Life" and danced with him. His rendition was ranked as one of the "10 Best Inauguration Performances of All Time" by USA Today and one of "The Best Inauguration Performances Throughout History" by Grazia, both in 2021. In the same year, it was placed on an unranked list of "Great Presidential Inauguration Musical Performances" by ABC News Radio. Martin's view of Bush changed over the Iraq War, as expressed in his declaration to BBC News that he will "always condemn war and those who promulgate it". He also stuck up his middle finger while singing the president's name in his 2003 song "Asignatura Pendiente" at a concert.

"La Copa de la Vida" was included on the set lists for Martin's the Vuelve World Tour, the Livin' la Vida Loca Tour, the One Night Only with Ricky Martin tour, the Black and White Tour, the Música + Alma + Sexo World Tour, the Ricky Martin Live tour, the Live in Mexico tour, the One World Tour, the All In residency, the Ricky Martin en Concierto, the Movimiento Tour, and the Enrique Iglesias and Ricky Martin Live in Concert tour. He performed it live at Latin Recording Academy Person of the Year gala in 2006 as part of a potpourri where he was honored with the accolade. Martin also performed the track along with his other hits during the 48th, 55th, and 61st editions of the Viña del Mar International Song Festival in 2007, 2014, and 2020, respectively. On February 11, 2011, he performed the song on The Ellen DeGeneres Show, and on February 12, 2015, he performed "Adiós", "Livin' la Vida Loca", and "The Cup of Life" on The Today Show. He also performed "Livin' la Vida Loca", "She Bangs", "Adrenalina", and "La Copa de la Vida" on season two of The Voice of Italy in 2014. In the last one, Martin was joined by Cristina Scuccia. On May 13, 2015, he performed "Mr. Put It Down", "Livin' la Vida Loca", "She Bangs", and "The Cup of Life" alongside Clark Beckham, Nick Fradiani, Quentin Alexander, Qaasim Middleton, and Rayvon Owen on the fourteenth season's finale of American Idol. He performed the song along with his other hits during the "Hillary Clinton: She's With Us" concert at the Greek Theatre on June 6, 2016.

== Cover versions and appearances in media ==
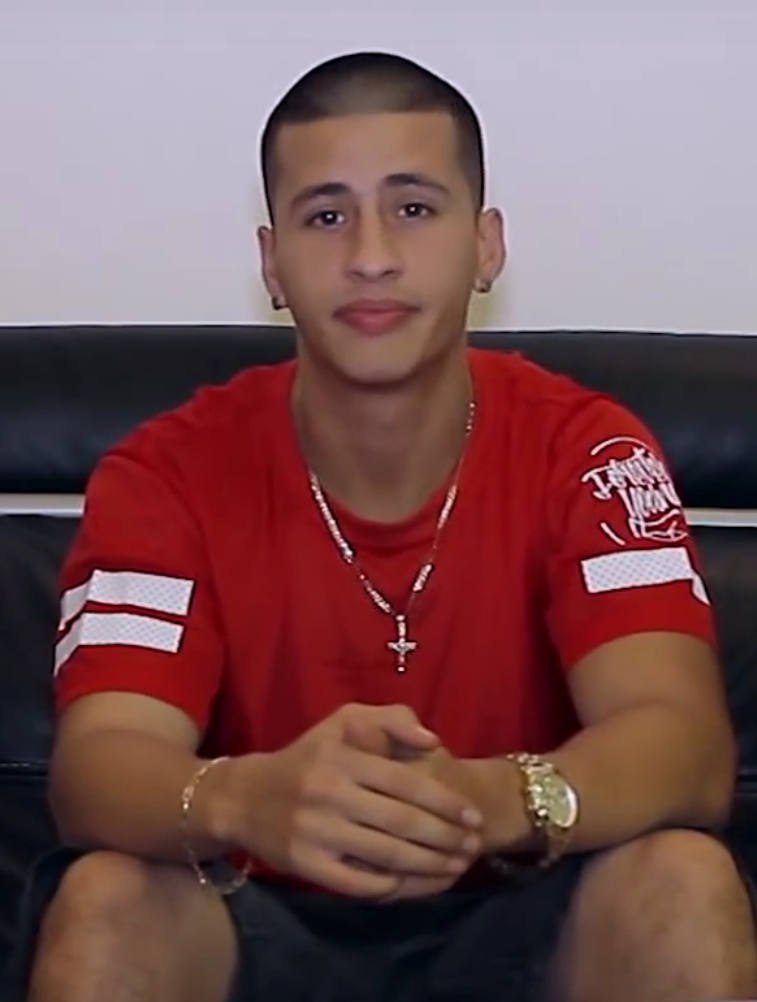
Carlito Olivero (pictured) performed a medley of "La Copa de la Vida" and "María" on The X Factor.

"La Copa de la Vida" was included on the set list for Sandy & Junior's Eu Acho que Pirei Tour, which began in April 1998. The song has been covered by several contestants on various music talent shows. Former Menudo member Carlito Olivero performed a medley of "La Copa de la Vida" and "María" on season three of The X Factor in 2013. In 2014, the Axis of Awesome performed "The Cup of Life" on season one of The Full Brazilian. Alondra Santos delivered a performance of "La Copa de la Vida" for the second semi-final of season 10 of America's Got Talent in 2015. Her rendition received favorable responses from the judges, and Lincee Ray from Entertainment Weekly gave it a positive review, saying: "Alondra works the stage like a pro. She sings to the camera, calls out to the audience, and even dances with her horn section." "The Cup of Life" has been used four times in Dancing with the Stars; Melissa and Tony danced to it on season 8 in 2009, Maria and Derek on season 14 in 2012, Team Vida on season 18 in 2014, and Skai and Nelly on season 29 in 2020.

The 2000 album La Vida Mickey features re-made versions of Latin/pop songs with the voices of the Disney characters in the background singing along. It includes the track "Mickey's Cup of Life" by Marco Marinangeli, which is a cover version of "The Cup of Life". La Sonora Dinamita recorded their own version of "La Copa de la Vida" for their 2019 album, which was also titled La Copa de la Vida. The album was released for digital download and streaming by Discos Aries, LLC on August 8, 2019.

== Legacy and influence ==
Martin is regarded by the media as the "King of World Cup", and "La Copa de la Vida" is considered as the "Best World Cup Anthem of All-Time" by multiple sources. Although the World Cup anthems only represented the culture of the host country until the 1994 FIFA World Cup, Martin broke the "tradition" and "all schemes" in 1998, with "La Copa de la Vida", which was played all over the world. He was the first international and Latin pop artist to appropriate the theme of a World Cup, making the song "fashionable" that continues to be heard in every World Cup. According to The Hollywood Reporter, "La Copa de la Vida" became a "musical template" for World Cup anthems, and Martin's Latin and dance crossover style has been much copied in the anthems, as well as football chant "Ole! Ole! Ole!" in the lyrics. As believed by Esquire, the song "inaugurated this musical subgenre" of Latin. Joy Bhattacharjya from The Economic Times wrote about "La Copa de la Vida" that it was the first World Cup anthem to have a video just "as ubiquitous as the song", going on to write: "Since then, official songs have an important part to play in every World Cup." In 2018, Diego Urdaneta from Vice credited the song as "one of those that laid the first stones so that J Balvin and Bad Bunnys of today can be at the top of the pyramid", labeling it "a milestone for Latin music". Following the announcement of "Hayya Hayya (Better Together)" by Trinidad Cardona, Davido, and Aisha as the 2022 FIFA World Cup's official anthem, users on the social media remembered "La Copa de la Vida" along with Shakira's Waka Waka (This Time for Africa) (2010) as the iconic World Cup anthems they missed.

"With his leather pants, big smile and energetic performance of 'The Cup of Life', Ricky Martin almost personally kicked off the so-called Latin Explosion of the late '90s."

— InStyle staff, about the performance at the 41st Annual Grammy Awards

Martin's performance of "The Cup of Life" at the Grammys not only changed the course of his career, but also altered how people regard Latin music in America. It has been known as a game-changer for Latin music worldwide, that effectively ushered in the "Latin explosion". Then-United Talent Agency head Rob Prinz described the rendition as "the single biggest game changing moment for any artist in the history of the Grammys". According to Billboard, it has been cited as the beginning of the "Latin Pop invasion", which powerfully affected the US mainstream. CNN's Harmeet Kaur wrote that the rendition "marked a breakthrough for Latin music", while Jesús Triviño Alarcón from Tidal Magazine stated, "that single performance opened up the mainstream market for the Latinx legends", mentioning the names of Marc Anthony, Shakira, and Jennifer Lopez.

== Formats and track listings ==
- Australian CD 1
1. "The Cup of Life" – 4:28
2. "The Cup of Life" (Remix – Radio Edit) – 4:37
3. "La Copa de la Vida" (Remix – Spanglish Radio Edit) – 4:37
4. "La Copa de la Vida" – 4:28
5. "María" (Jason Nevins Remix) – 3:45
- Australian CD 2
1. "María" (Radio Edit) – 4:31
2. "La Copa de la Vida/The Cup of Life" (Spanglish Radio Edit) – 4:37
3. "María" (Album Version) – 4:23
4. "María" (Perc A Pella Mix) – 5:07
5. "La Copa de la Vida" (Spanish) – 4:37
- European CD 1
1. "The Cup of Life" – 4:28
2. "The Cup of Life" (Remix – Radio Edit) – 4:37
- European CD 2
1. "La Copa De La Vida (La Cancion Oficial De La Copa Mundial, Francia '98)" (Album Version) – 4:28
2. "La Copa De La Vida (La Cancion Oficial De La Copa Mundial, Francia '98)" (Spanish Remix – Radio Edit) – 4:37
- European CD maxi-single 1
1. "The Cup of Life" – 4:28
2. "The Cup of Life" (Remix – Long Version) – 8:39
3. "La Copa de la Vida (Spanglish Remix – Radio Edit) – 4:37
4. "La Copa de la Vida (Album Version) – 4:28
- European CD maxi-single 2
1. "La Copa de la Vida" (Album Version) – 4:28
2. "La Copa de la Vida" (Spanish Remix – Long Version) – 8:39
3. "La Copa de la Vida" (Spanglish Version – Radio Edit) – 4:37
4. "The Cup of Life" – 4:28
- European 12-inch single
1. "La Copa De La Vida (La Cancion Oficial De La Copa Mundial, Francia '98)" (Spanish Remix – Long Version) – 8:39
2. "La Copa De La Vida (La Cancion Oficial De La Copa Mundial, Francia '98)" (Album Version) – 4:28
3. "La Copa De La Vida (La Cancion Oficial De La Copa Mundial, Francia '98)" (The Cup Of Life Remix - Long Version) – 8:39
4. "La Copa De La Vida (La Cancion Oficial De La Copa Mundial, Francia '98)" (Spanglish Remix – Long Version) – 8:39
- Japanese CD maxi-single
1. "The Cup of Life" (English Radio Edit) – 4:37
2. "The Cup of Life" (Spanglish Remix) – 8:39
3. "The Cup of Life" (Spanish Remix) – 8:40
4. "The Dub Of Life" (Mix) – 7:46
- UK CD maxi-single 1
1. "The Cup of Life" (English Radio Edit) – 4:37
2. "The Cup of Life" (Spanglish Radio Edit) – 4:37
3. "The Cup of Life" (Original English Version) – 4:31
4. "The Cup of Life" (Extended English Version) – 8:39
5. "The Cup of Life" (Extended Spanglish Version) – 8:39
- UK CD maxi-single 2
1. "The Cup of Life" (English Radio Edit) – 4:37
2. "The Cup of Life" (The Dub of Life Mix) – 7:44
3. "María" (Jason Nevins Remix) – 3:45
4. "María" (Spanglish Radio Edit) – 4:31
- US CD single
1. "The Cup of Life" (English Radio Edit) – 4:37
2. "María" (Jason Nevins Remix) – 3:45
- US CD maxi-single
1. "The Cup of Life" (English Radio Edit) – 4:37
2. "The Cup of Life" (Spanish Radio Edit) – 4:37
3. "The Cup of Life" (Spanglish Radio Edit) – 4:37
4. "The Cup of Life" (The Dub of Life Mix) – 7:44
5. "María" (Spanglish Radio Edit) – 4:31
6. "María" (Jason Nevins Remix) – 3:45
- US 12-inch single
1. "The Cup of Life" (English Long Version) – 8:39
2. "The Cup of Life" (Spanglish Long Version) – 8:38
3. "María" (Jason Nevins Remix) – 3:45
4. "The Cup of Life" (The Dub of Life Mix) – 7:44

== Credits and personnel ==
Credits are adapted from Tidal and the US maxi-CD single liner notes.

Studio locations

- Mixed at Crescent Moon Studios (Miami, Florida) and New River Studios (London, United Kingdom)
- Remixed at Crescent Moon Studios
- Edited at Ochoa Recording Studios (San Juan, Puerto Rico)

Personnel

- Ricky Martin – vocal, associated performer
- Luis Gómez-Escolar – composer, lyricist
- Desmond Child – composer, producer, lyricist
- Robi Rosa – composer, producer, lyricist, background vocal, recording engineer
- David Campbell – arranger
- Jeff Shannon – assistant engineer
- Jorge M. Jaramillo – assistant engineer
- Juan Rosario – assistant engineer
- Jules Condar – assistant engineer, recording engineer
- Kieran Murray – assistant engineer
- Rafa Sardina – assistant engineer
- Robert Valdez – assistant engineer
- Scott Kieklak – assistant engineer
- Teresa Cassin – assistant engineer
- Paul Gordon – assistant engineer
- Bill Smith – assistant engineer
- Luis Villanueva – assistant engineer
- Alberto Pino – assistant engineer
- Dave Dominguez – assistant engineer
- Francisco "Panchoî" – assistant engineer
- Tomaselli – assistant engineer
- Gene Lo – assistant engineer
- Iris Salazar – assistant engineer
- Julia Waters – background vocal
- Phil Perry – background vocal
- Ricky Nelson – background vocal
- John West – background vocal
- Darryl Phinnessee – background vocal
- Josie Aiello – background vocal
- Oren Waters – background vocal
- Carmen Twillie – background vocal
- Stefanie Spruill – background vocal
- James Gilstrap – background vocal
- Kristle Murden – background vocal
- Marlena Jeter – background vocal
- Bunny Hill – background vocal
- GB Dorsey – background vocal
- Jackeline Simley – background vocal
- Katrina Harper – background vocal
- Martonette Jenkins – background vocal
- Maxine Jeter – background vocal
- Phillip Ingram – background vocal
- Reggie Hamilton – bass
- Curt Bisquera – drums
- Michael Landau – electric guitar
- Leonardo Herrera – mixing engineer
- Bobby Rothstein – mixing engineer
- Charles Dye – mixing engineer, recording engineer
- Chris Brooke – mixing engineer
- Jun Murakawa – mixing engineer
- Mike Aarvold – mixing engineer
- Mike Ainsworth – mixing engineer
- Luis Quiñe – mixing engineer
- Travis Smith – mixing engineer
- Chris Carroll – mixing engineer
- Todd Keller – mixing engineer
- K.C. Porter – piano
- Randy Waldman – piano
- John Beasley – piano
- Esteban Villanueva – project coordintor, recording engineer
- Iris Aponte – project coordintor
- Sarah Wykes – project coordintor
- Steve Churchyard – recording engineer
- John Lowson – recording engineer
- Ted Stein – recording engineer
- Robert Fernández – recording engineer
- Brian Jenkins – recording engineer
- Doc Wiley – recording engineer
- Benny Faccone – recording engineer
- Carlos Nieto – recording engineer
- Danny Vicari – recording engineer
- Femio Hernández – recording engineer
- Héctor Iván Rosa – recording engineer
- Jeff Poe – recording engineer
- Jesus "Chuy" Flores – recording engineer
- John Karpowich – recording engineer
- Karl Cameron – recording engineer
- Keith Rose – recording engineer
- Luis Fernando Soria – recording engineer
- Matt Ross Hyde – recording engineer
- Peter McCabe – recording engineer
- Rik Pekkonen – recording engineer

== Charts ==
=== Weekly charts ===
Weekly chart performance for "La Copa de la Vida" / "The Cup of Life"
Chart (1998–1999)	Peak position
Australia (ARIA) with "María"	1
Austria (Ö3 Austria Top 40)	4
Belgium (Ultratop 50 Flanders)	27
Belgium (Ultratop 50 Wallonia)	1
Costa Rica (UPI)	1
El Salvador (UPI)	1
European (Eurochart Hot 100)	1
Finland (Suomen virallinen lista)	11
France (SNEP)	1
Germany (GfK)	1
Guatemala (UPI)	3
Honduras (UPI)	2
Italy (FIMI)	1
Japan (Oricon)	68
Netherlands (Dutch Top 40)	8
Netherlands (Single Top 100)	7
Nicaragua (UPI)	1
Norway (VG-lista)	2
Panama (UPI)	1
Scottish Singles Sales (Official Charts)	33
Spain (AFYVE)	1
Sweden (Sverigetopplistan)	1
Switzerland (Schweizer Hitparade)	1
UK Singles (Official Charts)	29
US Billboard Hot 100	45
US Adult Pop Airplay (Billboard)	40
US Dance Singles Sales (Billboard)	4
US Hot Latin Songs (Billboard)	2
US Pop Airplay (Billboard)	18
US Rhythmic Airplay (Billboard)	27
US Top 40 Tracks (Billboard)	15
Venezuela (UPI)	1

Weekly chart performance for "La Copa de la Vida"
Chart (2010–2022)	Peak position
US Latin Digital Song Sales (Billboard)	20

=== Year-end charts ===
1998 year-end chart performance for "La Copa de la Vida" / "The Cup of Life"
Chart (1998)	Position
Australia (ARIA)	1
Austria (Ö3 Austria Top 40)	35
Belgium (Ultratop 50 Flanders)	100
Belgium (Ultratop 50 Wallonia)	7
Europe (Eurochart Hot 100)	11
France (SNEP)	8
Germany (Media Control)	16
Italy (Musica e dischi)	1
Netherlands (Dutch Top 40)	73
Netherlands (Single Top 100)	67
Norway Spring Period (VG-lista)	2
Spain (AFYVE)	5
Sweden (Hitlistan)	5
Switzerland (Schweizer Hitparade)	9
US Hot Latin Tracks (Billboard)	19
US Maxi-Singles Sales (Billboard)	10

1999 year-end chart performance for "The Cup of Life"
Chart (1999)	Position
US Mainstream Top 40 (Billboard)	74
US Maxi-Singles Sales (Billboard)	29

=== Decade-end charts ===
1990s decade-end chart performance for "The Cup of Life"
Chart (1990–1999)	Position
Australia (ARIA)	13

== Certifications ==
Certifications and sales for "La Copa de la Vida" / "The Cup of Life"
Region	Certification	Certified units/sales
Australia (ARIA)	Platinum	70,000^{^}
Belgium (BRMA)	Platinum	50,000^{*}
France (SNEP)	Platinum	500,000^{*}
Germany (BVMI)	Gold	250,000^{^}
Netherlands (NVPI)	Gold	50,000^{^}
Norway (IFPI Norway)	Gold	
Sweden (GLF)	2× Platinum	60,000^{^}
Switzerland (IFPI Switzerland)	Gold	25,000^{^}
^{*} Sales figures based on certification alone.^{^} Shipments figures based on certification alone.

== Release history ==
Release dates and formats for "The Cup of Life"
Region	Date	Format(s)	Label	Ref.
Europe	March 9, 1998	CD maxi-single	Columbia	
Japan	May 27, 1998	CD maxi-single	Epic	
Australia	June 1, 1998	CD maxi-single	Columbia	

== See also ==
- List of European number-one hits of 1998
- List of number-one hits of 1998 (Germany)
- List of number-one hits of 1998 (Italy)
- List of number-one singles and albums in Sweden
- List of number-one singles in Australia during the 1990s
- List of number-one singles of 1998 (France)
- List of number-one singles of 1998 (Spain)
- List of number-one singles of the 1990s (Switzerland)
- Ultratop 40 number-one hits of 1998
- List of FIFA World Cup songs and anthems
