= Señora =

Señora is the Spanish-language equivalent of Ms. or Mrs.

- Señora (TV series), 1988 Venezuelan telenovela
- Señora, 1979 album by Rocío Jurado
- "Señora", 1992 song by Tito Rojas
- "Señora", 1997 song by Francisco Céspedes from Vida Loca
- "Señora", 2011 song by Vena
- Señora, 2026 album by Yuri
