= El aguacero =

El aguacero (Spanish: "rain") may refer to:

- "El aguacero", tango by Cátulo Castillo
- "El aguacero", song by Colombian singer Carolina Sabino, written Alejandro Gómez Cáceres, silver prize at Viña del Mar International Song Festival 1999
- "El aguacero", song by Juan Luis Guerra best video at Premio Lo Nuestro 1999
