= Premio Lo Nuestro 1999 =

Latin Music awards show

11th Lo Nuestro Awards
- Date: Thursday, May 6, 1999
- Site: James L. Knight Center; Miami, Florida, USA
- Hosted by: Julio Sabala

Highlights
- Most awards: Elvis Crespo (5)
- Most nominations: Elvis Crespo (6)

The 11th Lo Nuestro Awards ceremony, presented by Univision honoring the best Latin music of 1998 and 1999 took place on May 6, 1999, at a live presentation held at the James L. Knight Center in Miami, Florida. The ceremony was broadcast in the United States and Latin America by Univision.

During the ceremony, nineteen categories were presented. Winners were announced at the live event and included Puerto-Rican American singer Elvis Crespo receiving five competitive awards. Other multiple winners were Mexican singer-songwriter Pepe Aguilar with three wins, fellow Mexican band Maná and Colombian performer Shakira with two awards each. Aguilar earned the award for Regional Mexican Album of the Year, Crespo won for Tropical/Salsa Album of the Year, and the Pop Album of the Year was presented as a tie between Maná and Shakira. A special tribute was given to Mexican singer Pedro Fernández and the Excellence Award was received by Mexican group Los Tigres del Norte.

== Background ==
In 1989, the Lo Nuestro Awards were established by Univision, to recognize the most talented performers of Latin music. The nominees and winners were selected by a voting poll conducted among program directors of Spanish-language radio stations in the United States and the results were tabulated and certified by the accounting firm Arthur Andersen. The categories included are for the Pop, Tropical/Salsa, Regional Mexican and Music Video. The trophy awarded is shaped like a treble clef. The 11th Lo Nuestro Awards ceremony was held on May 7, 1999, in a live presentation held at the James L. Knight Center in Miami, Florida. The ceremony was broadcast in the United States and Latin America by Univision.

== Winners and nominees ==
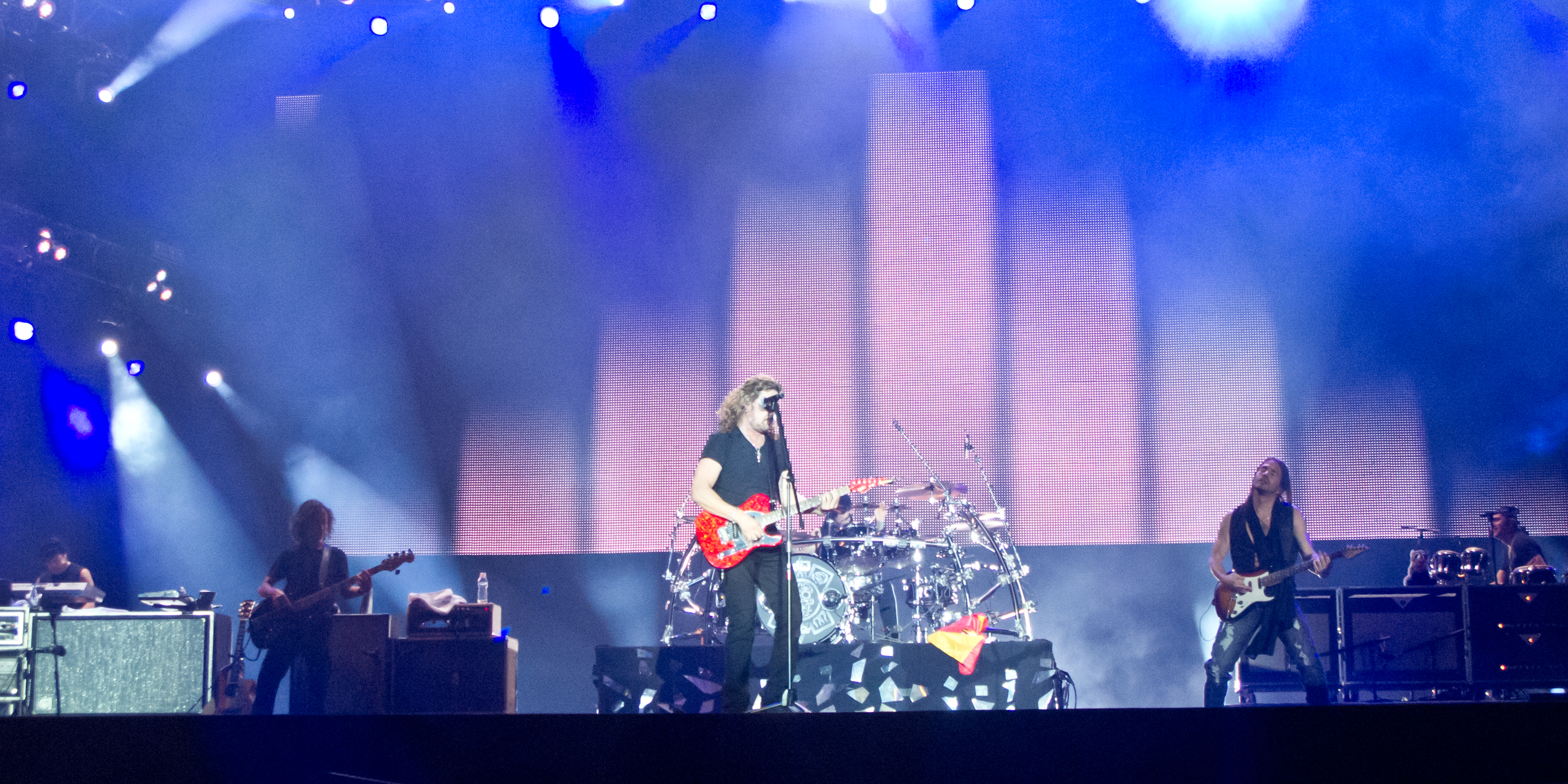
Maná (pictured in 2012) won two Lo Nuestro Awards in 1999, including Pop Album of the Year.

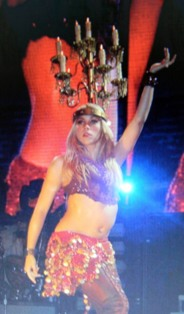
Colombian singer Shakira (pictured in 2008) was named Female Pop Singer of the Year.

Winners were announced before the live audience during the ceremony. Puerto-Rican American singer Elvis Crespo was the most nominated performer, with six nominations which resulted in five wins which included Tropical/Salsa Male Performer, Album of the Year, Song of the Year, Best New Artist and Group or Duo of the Year (shared with Milly Quezada). Mexican singer-songwriter Pepe Aguilar dominated the Regional/Mexican field winning three awards including Male Artist, Album of the Year and Song of the Year.

Three songs nominated for Pop Song of the Year reached number one at the Billboard Top Latin Songs chart: Ricky Martin's "Vuelve", Shakira's "Ciega, Sordomuda" and Chayanne's "Dejaría Todo"; Spanish performer Enrique Iglesias earned the accolade for Best Music Video for "Esperanza". The Pop Album of the Year was shared by Mexican band Maná and Colombian singer Shakira with Sueños Líquidos and Dónde Están los Ladrones?, respectively. Both albums were nominated at the 41st Grammy Awards for Best Latin Rock/Alternative Performance with Maná receiving the award. Puerto-Rican American performer Ricky Martin performed at the Grammy Awards the song "The Cup of Life", and the Spanish-language version won the Pop Song of the Year at the Lo Nuestro Awards.

Winners and nominees of the 11th Annual Lo Nuestro Awards (winners listed first)
Pop Album of the Year	Pop Song of the Year
Maná – Sueños Líquidos (tie); Shakira – Dónde Están los Ladrones? (tie); Chayanne – Atado a Tu Amor; Juan Gabriel – Celebracion de los 25 Años de Juan Gabriel en Bellas Artes; Enrique Iglesias – Cosas del Amor	Ricky Martin – "La Copa de la Vida"; Chayanne – "Dejaría Todo"; Ricky Martin – "Vuelve"; Alejandro Sanz – "Corazón Partío"; Shakira – "Ciega, Sordomuda"
Male Artist of the Year, Pop	Female Artist of the Year, Pop
Ricky Martin; Alejandro Fernández; Enrique Iglesias; Alejandro Sanz	Shakira; Gloria Estefan; Fey; Olga Tañón
Pop Duo or Group of the Year	New Pop Artist of the Year
Maná; Andrea Bocelli and Marta Sánchez; Olga Tañón and Cristian; Sentidos Opuestos	Carlos Ponce; Andrea Bocelli; El Reencuentro; Nek; Los Trio-O; Só Pra Contrariar
Regional Mexican Album of the Year	Regional Mexican Song of the Year
Pepe Aguilar – Por Mujeres Como Tu; Límite – De Corazón a Corazón; Los Temerarios – Cómo Te Recuerdo; Los Tigres del Norte – Así como Tú; Los Tucanes de Tijuana – Amor Platónico	Pepe Aguilar – "Por Mujeres Como Tú"; Banda Arkangel R-15 – "Voy a Pintar Mi Raya"; Julio Preciado – "Dos Hojas sin Rumbo"; Vicente Fernández – "Me Voy a Quitar de En Medio"; Intocable – "Eres Mi Droga"; Los Temerarios – "Botella Envenenada"
Male Artist of the Year, Regional Mexican	Female Artist of the Year, Regional Mexican
Pepe Aguilar; Pedro Fernández; Joan Sebastian; Marco Antonio Solís	Ana Gabriel; Ana Bárbara; Graciela Beltrán; Yesenia Flores
Regional Mexican Group of the Year	New Regional Mexican Artist of the Year
Límite; Los Temerarios; Los Tigres del Norte; Los Tucanes de Tijuana	Pablo Montero; Guadalupe Esparza; Yesenia Flores; Julio Preciado; Patricia Navidad
Tropical/Salsa Album of the Year	Tropical/Salsa Song of the Year
Elvis Crespo – Suavemente; Alquimia – Leyenda 2; Gisselle and Sergio Vargas – Juntos; Jerry Rivera – De Otra Manera; Charlie Zaa – Un Segundo Sentimiento	Elvis Crespo – "Suavemente"; Elvis Crespo and Milly Quezada – "Para Darte Mi Vida"; Marc Anthony – "Contra la Corriente"; Frankie Negrón – "Agua Pasada"; Servando & Florentino – "Una Fan Enamorada"
Male Artist of the Year, Tropical/Salsa	Female Artist of the Year, Tropical/Salsa
Elvis Crespo; Marc Anthony; Frankie Negrón; Charlie Zaa	Olga Tañón; Gisselle; La India; Milly Quezada
Tropical/Salsa Duo or Group of the Year	New Tropical/Salsa Artist of the Year
Elvis Crespo and Milly Quezada; Alquimia; DLG; Los Toro Band; Grupo Manía; Servando & Florentino	Elvis Crespo; Charlie Cardona; Fulanito; Servando & Florentino
Video of the Year
Enrique Iglesias – "Esperanza"; Juan Luis Guerra – "El Aguacero"; Maná – "En el Muelle de San Blas"; MDO – "No Puedo Olvidar"; Carlos Ponce – "Rezo"; Shakira – "Ciega, Sordomuda"; Olga Tañón – "Tu Amor"

== Special awards ==
- Song of the Century: "Bésame Mucho" by Consuelo Velázquez.
- Lo Nuestro Excellence Award: Los Tigres del Norte
- Special Tribute: Pedro Fernández

== See also ==
- 1998 in Latin music
- 1999 in Latin music
- Grammy Award for Best Latin Pop Album
- Grammy Award for Best Latin Rock/Alternative Performance
- Grammy Award for Best Traditional Tropical Latin Album
