= Contra la Corriente =

Contra la Corriente may refer to:

- Contra la Corriente (Marc Anthony album), a 1997 salsa album
  - Contra la Corriente (song)
- Contra la Corriente (Noriega album), a 2004 reggaeton album
- Contra la Corriente (Janina album), a 2006 pop-rock album
