= Que Habría Sido de Mí =

1998 song by Víctor Manuelle

Single by Víctor Manuelle

from the album Ironías
- Language: Spanish
- Released: 1998
- Studio: AQ-30 Studio; Power Light Studio; Skylight Studios
- Genre: Salsa
- Length: 4:42
- Label: Sony Discos
- Songwriter(s): Omar Alfanno
- Producer(s): Víctor Manuelle • Ramón Sánchez

Víctor Manuelle singles chronology
"Se Me Rompe el Alma" (1995)	"Que Habría Sido de Mí" (1998)	"El Cuerpo Me Pide" (1998)

"Que Habría Sido de Mí" (English: "What Would Have Become of Me") is a song written by Omar Alfanno and performed by Puerto Rican singer Víctor Manuelle on his fifth studio album, Ironías(1998), and was released as the second single from the album. It became his seventh number song on the Tropical Airplay chart. AllMusic critic José A. Estévez, Jr. cited it as one of the songs from where the album where Ramón Sánchez's arrangements allows Manuelle to "drive the best of the talented improviser, belting it out with all his might". This sentiment was shared by Billboard editor John Lannert who called it one of the album's "well-crafted tracks". Parry Gettelman praised the performance of both the bassist and the pianist in the track. On the former, she noted that Ruben Rodriguez "provides a graceful bass line that subtly builds tension released in the soaring chorus". It was nominated "Tropical/Salsa Hot Track of the Year" at the 1999 Latin Billboard Music Awards, but lost to "Suavemente" by Elvis Crespo. In 2000, it was recognized as one of the best-performing songs of the year at the American Society of Composers, Authors and Publishers Awards under the salsa category.

== Charts ==
=== Weekly charts ===
Chart (1998)	Peak position
US Hot Latin Songs (Billboard)	5
US Tropical Airplay (Billboard)	1

=== Year-end charts ===
1999 year-end chart performance for "Que Habría Sido de Mí"
Chart (1999)	Position
US Hot Latin Songs (Billboard)	30
US Tropical Airplay (Billboard)	6

== See also ==
- List of Billboard Tropical Airplay number ones of 1998
