= De Bohemia =

Studio album by Charlie Zaa
- Released: September 6, 2011
- Genres: Pop Latino, Bolero
- Label: Seyer

Charlie Zaa chronology
| Bachata con Puro Sentimiento (2005) | De Bohemia (2011) | Mi Mejor Regalo (2015) |

De Bohemia is the title of a studio album released by Colombian performer Charlie Zaa. This album is a tribute to Cuban performer Orlando Contreras, and was recorded by Zaa after his temporary retirement from the music business, where he was admitted to a clinic to treat problems with panic attacks and depression. Zaa recorded the album after being convinced by his wife to do so.

The album debuted at number 38 in the Billboard Latin Albums chart the week of October 8, 2011. Five weeks later the album jumped from twenty to number-one, becoming Zaa's second chart topper, following his debut album in 1997. De Bohemia also replaced Prince Royce's self-titled debut album at the top of the Tropical Albums chart.

== Track listing ==
This track listing adapted from Allmusic.

| No. | Title | Writer(s) | Length |
|---|---|---|---|
| 1. | "En Un Beso a la Vida" | Carlos Di Sarli, Héctor Marco | 2:40 |
| 2. | "Amigo De Qué" | Arty Valdés | 2:52 |
| 3. | "Por Borracha" | Pablo Cairo | 2:38 |
| 4. | "Mosaico: Mi Corazonada/Dónde Tú Irás" | Rafael Hernández, José Fernández | 4:40 |
| 5. | "Amarga Decepción" | Dagoberto Calzado | 2:32 |
| 6. | "Dolor de Hombre" | Valdés | 2:52 |
| 7. | "Por Un Puñado de Oro" | Carlos Gómez | 3:13 |
| 8. | "Mosáico: Sin Egoísmo/Egoísmo" | García Escobar, Moisés Zovain | 5:04 |
| 9. | "Sabor de Engaño" | Mario Alvarez | 2:41 |
| 10. | "Un Corazón de Madera" | R. Ramos | 2:51 |

== Personnel ==
- Jorge Hugo Alvarez — piano
- Jaime Atencia — mixing
- Mauricio Daltaire — maracas

== Charts ==
| Chart (2011) | Peak position |
|---|---|
| US Billboard 200 | 158 |
| US Top Latin Albums (Billboard) | 1 |
| US Tropical Albums (Billboard) | 1 |
| US Independent Albums (Billboard) | 35 |

== Sales and certifications ==
| Region | Certification | Certified units/sales |
|---|---|---|
| United States (RIAA) | Gold (Latin) | 30,000^{^} |
^{^} Shipments figures based on certification alone.

== See also ==
- List of number-one Billboard Latin Albums from the 2010s
