= Mi Mayor Venganza =

1997 song by La India

Single by La India

from the album Sobre el Fuego
- Released: 1997
- Studio: Skylight, Belleville, New Jersey
- Genre: Salsa
- Length: 5:14
- Label: RMM
- Songwriter: Rodolfo Barreras
- Producer: Isidro Infante

La India singles chronology
"Me Cansé de Ser la Otra" (1997)	"Mi Mayor Venganza" (1997)	"Si Tú Eres Mi Hombre" (1998)

"Mi Mayor Venganza" (transl. "My Greatest Revenge") is a song by Puerto Rican singer La India from her fifth studio album, Sobre el Fuego (1997). The song was written by Rodolfo Barreras and produced by Isidro Infante, and released as the album's second single in 1997 by RMM Records. It is a salsa song, in which La India tells the woman to keep the man who cheated on the artist out of revenge.

La India's vocals on "Mi Mayor Venganza" were praised by two music critics while another reviewer noted it has become an anthem with the salsa audience. It was a recipient of the American Society of Composers, Authors and Publishers (ASCAP) Latin Award in 2000 in the salsa category. Commercially, the song peaked at numbers four and one on the Billboard Hot Latin Songs and Tropical Airplay charts in the United States, respectively. An accompanying music video features La India performing at an empty theater.

== Background and composition ==
In 1994, La India released her third studio album Dicen Que Soy, which according to AllMusic's Jason Birchmeier was her "mainstream breakthrough" as a salsa artist. The album topped the Billboard Tropical Albums chart and its five singles "Nunca Voy a Olvidarte", "Ese Hombre", the title track, "Que Ganas de Nunca Verte Más", and "O Ella o Yo" reached the top ten on the Billboard Tropical Airplay chart. To capitalize on her success, RMM Records president Ralph Mercado had La India collaborate with American musician Tito Puente on the Latin jazz record Jazzin' (1996). In the same year, Puerto Rican musician and arranger Isidro Infante signed with RMM Records. By the time of his signing, Infante was credited for over 2,500 arrangements and had produced for artists such as Puente, Celia Cruz, and Herb Alpert. On August 9, 1997, Billboard's John Lannert reported that La India was set to launch a new disc the following month.

La India revealed further details about the album including its name, Sobre el Fuego (1997), and that the record was being produced by Infante, whom she described as a "pleasure to work with". Recording took place at the Skylight in Belleville, New Jersey. Sobre el Fuego was eventually released on September 9, 1997, and is La India's third solo salsa album. One of the record's salsa tracks, "Mi Mayor Venganza" was written by Puerto Rican singer-songwriter Rodolfo Barreras, who has composed for other artists such as Ednita Nazario, José Feliciano, Elvis Crespo, Jerry Rivera, and Gilberto Santa Rosa., According to the Los Angeles Times editor Alisa Valdes-Rodriguez, the song addresses the "cultural norm of fighting to keep your man when he cheats on you. Rather than fight the other woman, India sang, the best revenge would be to let the other woman keep the jerk."

== Promotion and reception ==
"Mi Mayor Venganza" was released as the second single from Sobre el Fuego by RMM Records in 1997. A music video for the song was filmed and features La India performing in an empty theater. Valdes noted that the track has become an "anthem in salsa circles". The Newsday critic Richard Torres lauded La India's vocals, stating her "driven full-throttle assault simply energizes the track". Similarly, K. Matthew Davis of the Press & Sun-Bulletin observed La India's vocal evolution on the song as it "demands less percussion, but much more power". He further opined that the artist "comes through like a champ, showing that she has learned how to summon strength from her diaphragm".

It was recognized as one of the best-performing songs of the year at the ASCAP Latin Awards under the salsa category in 2000. Commercially "Mi Mayor Venganza" reached number four on the |Billboard Hot Latin Songs chart and topped the Tropical Airplay chart in the US; it spent two weeks at this spot on the latter chart. On the year-end chart, the song ended 1998 ranked as number five on the Tropical Airplay chart.

== Charts ==
=== Weekly charts ===
Chart performance for "Mi Mayor Venganza"
Chart (1998)	Peak position
US Hot Latin Songs (Billboard)	4
US Tropical Airplay (Billboard)	1

=== Year-end charts ===
1998 year-end chart performance for "Mi Mayor Venganza"
Chart (1998)	Position
US Hot Latin Songs (Billboard)	35
US Tropical Airplay (Billboard)	5

== See also ==
- List of Billboard Tropical Airplay number ones of 1998
