= Ultratop 40 number-one hits of 1998 =

This is a list of songs that topped the Belgian Walloon (francophone) Ultratop 40 in 1998.

Date	Title	Artist
January 3	"Savoir aimer"	Florent Pagny
January 10	"Savoir aimer"	Florent Pagny
January 17	"Hasta Siempre"	Nathalie Cardone
January 24	"Vivo per lei (je vis pour elle)"	Andrea Bocelli with Hélène Ségara
January 31	"Vivo per lei (je vis pour elle)"	Andrea Bocelli with Hélène Ségara
February 7	"Vivo per lei (je vis pour elle)"	Andrea Bocelli with Hélène Ségara
February 14	"Vivo per lei (je vis pour elle)"	Andrea Bocelli with Hélène Ségara
February 21	"Vivo per lei (je vis pour elle)"	Andrea Bocelli with Hélène Ségara
February 28	"My Heart Will Go On"	Celine Dion
March 7	"My Heart Will Go On"	Celine Dion
March 14	"My Heart Will Go On"	Celine Dion
March 21	"My Heart Will Go On"	Celine Dion
March 28	"My Heart Will Go On"	Celine Dion
April 4	"My Heart Will Go On"	Celine Dion
April 11	"My Heart Will Go On"	Celine Dion
April 18	"My Heart Will Go On"	Celine Dion
April 25	"My Heart Will Go On"	Celine Dion
May 2	"My Heart Will Go On"	Celine Dion
May 9	"Je me souviens"	Marianne Molina
May 16	"Je me souviens"	Marianne Molina
May 23	"Formula"	DJ Visage
May 30	"Formula"	DJ Visage
June 6	"Formula"	DJ Visage
June 13	"Formula"	DJ Visage
June 20	"Formula"	DJ Visage
June 27	"La Copa de la Vida"	Ricky Martin
July 4	"Feel It"	Tamperer featuring Maya
July 11	"Pata pata"	Coumba Gawlo
July 18	"Pata pata"	Coumba Gawlo
July 25	"La Tribu de Dana"	Manau
August 1	"La Tribu de Dana"	Manau
August 8	"La Tribu de Dana"	Manau
August 15	"La Tribu de Dana"	Manau
August 22	"La Tribu de Dana"	Manau
August 29	"La Tribu de Dana"	Manau
September 5	"La Tribu de Dana"	Manau
September 12	"La Tribu de Dana"	Manau
September 19	"Belle"	Patrick Fiori, Daniel Lavoie and Garou
September 26	"Belle"	Patrick Fiori, Daniel Lavoie and Garou
October 3	"Belle"	Patrick Fiori, Daniel Lavoie and Garou
October 10	"Belle"	Patrick Fiori, Daniel Lavoie and Garou
October 17	"Belle"	Patrick Fiori, Daniel Lavoie and Garou
October 24	"Belle"	Patrick Fiori, Daniel Lavoie and Garou
October 31	"Şımarık"	Tarkan
November 7	"Şımarık"	Tarkan
November 14	"Şımarık"	Tarkan
November 21	"Şımarık"	Tarkan
November 28	"Chanter pour ceux qui sont loin de chez eux"	Lââm
December 5	"Chanter pour ceux qui sont loin de chez eux"	Lââm
December 12	"Chanter pour ceux qui sont loin de chez eux"	Lââm
December 19	"Chanter pour ceux qui sont loin de chez eux"	Lââm
December 26	"Chanter pour ceux qui sont loin de chez eux"	Lââm

== See also ==
- 1998 in music
