= Corazón Encadenado =

1984 song by Lani Hall and Camilo Sesto

"Corazón encandenado"

Promotional single by Lani Hall and Camilo Sesto

from the album Lani Hall
- B-side: "Ven a mis brazos"
- Released: 1984
- Genre: Latin
- Length: 4:08
- Label: A&M
- Songwriters: Camilo Sesto, Sergio Fachelli

"Corazón encandenado" ("Chained Heart") is a song by American singer by Lani Hall from her 1984 self-titled album. It features Spanish singer-songwriter Camilo Sesto, who also composed the track along with Sergio Fachelli. The song speaks about a trust issue between two lovers. The song was covered by Sergio Vargas and Gisselle as a merengue song on their collaboration album Juntos (1998). The duo's version peaked at number four on the Billboard Hot Latin Songs chart and reached number one on the Billboard Tropical Airplay chart. The song was also covered by Graciela Beltrán and Conjunto Primavera on Beltrán's album Mi Otro Sentimiento (2004). Their version peaked at number 32 at the Billboard Regional Mexican Airplay chart and was nominated "Hot Latin Track Of The Year, Vocal Duet" at the 2005 Latin Billboard Music Awards.

== See also ==
- List of number-one hits of 1984 (Mexico)
- List of Billboard Tropical Airplay number ones of 1998
