= List of number-one hits of 1998 (Italy) =

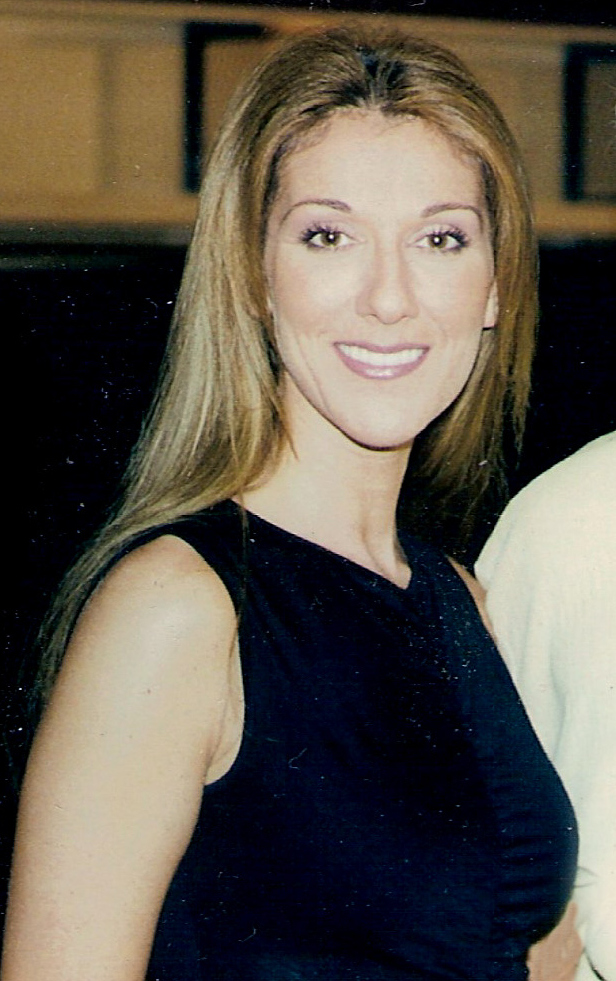
Celine Dion's "My Heart Will Go On" topped the Italian singles chart for 10 non-consecutive weeks in 1998.

The list of number-one singles of 1998 in Italy includes all the songs that reached the top spot on the weekly chart compiled by the Federazione Industria Musicale Italiana (FIMI).

== Chart history ==
Week	Single	Artist(s)	Ref.
1	"Something About the Way You Look Tonight" / "Candle in the Wind 1997"	Elton John	
2	"Something About the Way You Look Tonight" / "Candle in the Wind 1997"	Elton John	
3	"Something About the Way You Look Tonight" / "Candle in the Wind 1997"	Elton John	
4	"All Around the World"	Oasis	
5	"Something About the Way You Look Tonight" / "Candle in the Wind 1997"	Elton John	
6	"Something About the Way You Look Tonight" / "Candle in the Wind 1997"	Elton John	
7	"My Heart Will Go On"	Celine Dion	
8	"Frozen"	Madonna	
9	"My Heart Will Go On"	Celine Dion	
10	"My Heart Will Go On"	Celine Dion	
11	"My Heart Will Go On"	Celine Dion	
12	"L'impossibile vivere" / "Il mercante di stelle"	Renato Zero	
13	"My Heart Will Go On"	Celine Dion	
14	"My Heart Will Go On"	Celine Dion	
15	"My Heart Will Go On"	Celine Dion	
16	"My Heart Will Go On"	Celine Dion	
17	"My Heart Will Go On"	Celine Dion	
18	"My Heart Will Go On"	Celine Dion	
19	"La copa de la vida"	Ricky Martin	
20	"High"	Lighthouse Family	
21	"High"	Lighthouse Family	
22	"La copa de la vida"	Ricky Martin	
23	"Truly Madly Deeply"	Savage Garden	
24	"Da me a te"	Claudio Baglioni	
25	"Da me a te"	Claudio Baglioni	
26	"Da me a te"	Claudio Baglioni	
27	"Life"	Des'ree	
28	"Life"	Des'ree	
29	"Life"	Des'ree	
30	"Life"	Des'ree	
31	"Life"	Des'ree	
32	"Life"	Des'ree	
33	"Life"	Des'ree	
34	"Life"	Des'ree	
35	"Life"	Des'ree	
36	"I Don't Want to Miss a Thing"	Aerosmith	
37	"I Don't Want to Miss a Thing"	Aerosmith	
38	"I Don't Want to Miss a Thing"	Aerosmith	
39	"I Don't Want to Miss a Thing"	Aerosmith	
40	"I Don't Want to Miss a Thing"	Aerosmith	
41	"I Don't Want to Miss a Thing"	Aerosmith	
42	"I Don't Want to Miss a Thing"	Aerosmith	
43	"I Don't Want to Miss a Thing"	Aerosmith	
44	"Sweetest Thing"	U2	
45	"I Don't Want to Miss a Thing"	Aerosmith	
46	"Iris"	Goo Goo Dolls	
47	"Iris"	Goo Goo Dolls	
48	"Iris"	Goo Goo Dolls	
49	"Iris"	Goo Goo Dolls	
50	"Iris"	Goo Goo Dolls	
51	"Goodbye"	Spice Girls	
52	"Believe"	Cher	
53	"Believe"	Cher	
