= List of number-one hits of 1984 (Mexico) =

This is a list of the songs that reached number one in Mexico in 1984, according to the Notitas Musicales magazine with data provided by Radio Mil (which also provided charts for Billboard's "Hits of the World" between 1969 and 1981).

Notitas Musicales was a bi-weekly magazine that published two record charts:

- "Canciones que México canta" ("Songs that Mexico sings"), which listed the Top 10 most popular Spanish-language songs in Mexico, and
- "Hit Parade", which was a Top 10 of the most popular songs in non-Spanish languages in Mexico.

== Chart history ==
Issue Date	Spanish-language songs		Songs in other languages		Ref.
Issue Date	Song	Artist(s)	Song	Artist(s)	Ref.
1 January	"Celos"	Daniela Romo	"Searchin' (I Gotta Find a Man)"	Hazell Dean	
15 January	"Celos"	Daniela Romo	"Billie Jean"	Michael Jackson	
1 February	"Lo dudo"	José José	"Living on Video"	Trans-X	
15 February	"Celos"	Daniela Romo	"Living on Video"	Trans-X	
1 March	"Celos"	Daniela Romo	"Say, Say, Say"	Michael Jackson & Paul McCartney	
15 March	"Mi amor, amor"	Lucía Méndez	"Say, Say, Say"	Michael Jackson & Paul McCartney	
1 April	"Mi amor, amor"	Lucía Méndez	"Living on Video"	Trans-X	
15 April	"Mi amor, amor"	Lucía Méndez	"Living on Video"	Trans-X	
1 May	"Mi amor, amor"	Lucía Méndez	"Living on Video"	Trans-X	
15 May	"Mi amor, amor"	Lucía Méndez	"Karma Chameleon"	Culture Club	
1 June	"Mi amor, amor"	Lucía Méndez	"Living on Video"	Trans-X	
15 June	"Mi amor, amor"	Lucía Méndez	"Living on Video"	Trans-X	
1 July	"Con las alas rotas"	Prisma	"Karma Chameleon"	Culture Club	
15 July	"Corazón Encadenado"	Lani Hall & Camilo Sesto	"Karma Chameleon"	Culture Club	
1 August	"Corazón Encadenado"	Lani Hall & Camilo Sesto	"Self Control"	Laura Branigan	
15 August	"Corazón Encadenado"	Lani Hall & Camilo Sesto	"My Forbidden Lover"	Tapps	
1 September	"Corazón Encadenado"	Lani Hall & Camilo Sesto	"Self Control"	Laura Branigan	
15 September	"Querida"	Juan Gabriel	"Girls Just Want to Have Fun"	Cyndi Lauper	
1 October	"Querida"	Juan Gabriel	"Girls Just Want to Have Fun"	Cyndi Lauper	
15 October	"Querida"	Juan Gabriel	"Girls Just Want to Have Fun"	Cyndi Lauper	
1 November	"Querida"	Juan Gabriel	"Girls Just Want to Have Fun"	Cyndi Lauper	
15 November	"Querida"	Juan Gabriel	"Ghostbusters"	Ray Parker Jr.	
1 December	"Querida"	Juan Gabriel	"Ghostbusters"	Ray Parker Jr.	
15 December	"Querida"	Juan Gabriel	"I Just Called To Say I Love You"	Stevie Wonder	

== See also ==
- 1984 in music

== Sources ==
- Print editions of the Notitas Musicales magazine.
