= Una Fan Enamorada =

1998 song by Servando & Florentino

Single by Servando & Florentino

from the album Los Primera
- Released: 1997
- Studio: Audio Uno Studios, Caracas, Venezuela; Intersonido Studios, Caracas, Venezuela; Power Light Telearte Estudios, Caracas, Venezuela
- Genre: Salsa; Latin pop (ballad version)
- Length: 4:49 (salsa version); 4:59 (ballad version)
- Label: Hecho a Mano
- Songwriter: Ricardo Montaner
- Producers: Sergio George; Yasmil Marrufo

Servando & Florentino singles chronology
"Una Fan Enamorada" (1997)	"Aliviame" (1998)

"Una Fan Enamorada" ("Fan in Love") is a song by Venezuelan duo Servando & Florentino from their debut album Los Primera (1997). It was written by Venezuelan musician Ricardo Montaner and released as the album's lead single in 1997. The song was recorded in salsa and ballad. It speaks of a "direct intimacy and understanding to every smitten fan who pined for the guys". Diana Raquel of La Prensa praised as a "catchy song where the voices of Servando and Florentino are heard in perfect harmony." The Miami Herald critic Eliseo Cardona was less impressed with the track, stating it should only be listed to once as it has "the same plot of a Venevision soap opera". "Una Fan Enamorada" served as the closing theme for the Venezuelan telenovela Todo por tu amor (1997). "Una Fan Enamorada" was nominated in the category of Tropical Song of the Year at the 11th Annual Lo Nuestro Awards, but lost to "Suavemente" by Elvis Crespo.

== Charts ==
=== Weekly charts ===
Chart performance for "Una Fan Enamorada"
Chart (1998)	Peak position
US Hot Latin Songs (Billboard)	1
US Tropical Airplay (Billboard)	1

=== Year-end charts ===
1998 year-end chart performance for "Una Fan Enamorada"
Chart (1998)	Position
US Hot Latin Songs (Billboard)	21
US Tropical Airplay (Billboard)	6

== See also ==
- List of number-one Billboard Hot Latin Tracks of 1998
- List of Billboard Tropical Airplay number ones of 1998
