= Mi Mejor Regalo (Charlie Zaa album) =

Studio album by Charlie Zaa
- Released: November 13, 2015
- Genre: Bolero, Tropical music
- Label: Sony Music Latin
- Producer: Sergio George

Charlie Zaa chronology
De Bohemia (2011)	Mi Mejor Regalo (2015)

Singles from Romance
- 1. "Un Idiota" Released: September 8, 2015

Mi Mejor Regalo (My Best Gift) is the title of a studio album released by Colombian performer Charlie Zaa and produced by Sergio George. This album is a tribute to Mexican singer-songwriter Joan Sebastian who died four months prior to the release of the album. According to Zaa, the concept of the album began a year before Sebastian's death. The album's first single, "Un Idiota", reached number one on the Tropical Songs chart while the album also reached number on the Tropical Albums chart.

== Track listing ==
All tracks are written by Joan Sebastian.

No.	Title	Length
1.	"Una Noche Más"	3:47
2.	"Tú y Yo"	2:59
3.	"Un Idiota"	3:17
4.	"Rumores"	3:30
5.	"Llorar"	3:01
6.	"Hasta Que Amanezca"	3:29
7.	"Me Gustas"	3:47
8.	"25 Rosas"	3:32
9.	"Secreto de Amor"	3:39
10.	"Mascarada" (featuring Héctor Acosta)	3:27

== Charts ==
Chart (2015)	Peak position
US Tropical Albums (Billboard)	1
US Top Latin Albums (Billboard)	3

=== Year-end charts ===
Chart (2016)	Position
US Tropical Albums	6

== See also ==
- List of number-one Billboard Tropical Albums from the 2010s
