= Sobre el Fuego =

Studio album by La India
- Released: September 9, 1997
- Genre: Latin, salsa
- Label: RMM
- Producer: Ralph Mercado (exec.), Isidro Infante (musical)

La India chronology
Jazzin' (1996)	Sobre el Fuego (1997)	Sola (1999)

Singles from Sobre el Fuego
- 1. "Me Cansé De Ser La Otra"; 2. "Mi Mayor Venganza"; 3. "Costumbres"; 4. "Si Tu Eres Mi Hombre"

Professional ratings
Review scores
Source	Rating
Allmusic	4.5/5 stars

Sobre el Fuego is India's second solo album. The album received a Grammy Award nomination for Best Tropical Latin Performance and a Lo Nuestro Award nomination for Tropical/Salsa Album of the Year.

== Track listing ==
1. Me Cansé De Ser La Otra — 05:16
2. Costumbres — 05:53
3. Burlada Inocencia — 04:27
4. No Me Lo Confiesas — 04:44
5. Si Tú Eres Mi Hombre — 05:32
6. Mi Mayor Venganza — 05:18
7. Sobre El Fuego — 05:19
8. Te Daré Dulzura — 05:36
9. La Voz De La Experiencia (Duet With Celia Cruz) — 05:28
10. Si Estuvieras Aquí — 06:01

== Charts ==
Chart (1997)	Peak position
US Billboard Tropical/Salsa	1
US Billboard Top Latin Albums	4
US Billboard Heatseekers	33

== See also ==
- List of number-one Billboard Tropical Albums from the 1990s
