= Los Primera =

Studio album by Servando & Florentino
- Released: February 10, 1998
- Length: 1:01:35
- Label: WEA Latina
- Producer: Sergio George • Yasmil Marrufo • Alejandro Salas • Ramón Sánchez

Servando & Florentino chronology
Los Primera (1998)	Muchacho Solitario (1999)

Professional ratings
Review scores
Source	Rating
AllMusic	4/5 stars

Los Primera (The Primera Brothers) is the debut studio album by Venezuelan sibling duo Servando & Florentino. The album was nominated "Tropical/Salsa Album of the Year by a Duo or Group" and "Tropical/Salsa Album of the Year by a New Artist" at the 1999 Billboard Latin Music Awards. The contains the lead single "Una Fan Enamorada".

== Track listing ==
No.	Title	Writer(s)	Length
1.	"Una Fan Enamorada" (Salsa version)	Ricardo Montaner	04:49
2.	"Con Ella No"	Sergio George, Servando Primera	05:04
3.	"Tengo un Corazón"	Guadalupe "Lupillo" García, Sergio George, Servando Primera	04:52
4.	"Por Haberte Querido Tanto"	Servando Primera	04:52
5.	"Me Emamore"	Rómulo Riera	04:56
6.	"Antonio"	Omar Alfanno, Luis Enrique	04:46
7.	"Los Hermanos Primera"	Sergio George, Servando Primera	04:45
8.	"Aliviame"	Ricardo Montaner	04:48
9.	"Primer Amor"	Edwin Apolinares	04:36
10.	"Esta Hechas Para Mi"	Reinaldo "Pachi" López	04:48
11.	"Una Fan Enamorada" (Ballad version)	Ricardo Montaner	04:59
12.	"Aliviame" (Ballad version)	Ricardo Montaner	03:54
13.	"Pero Como Olvidar"	Yasmil Marrufo	04:26

== Charts ==
Chart (1998)	Peak position
US Top Latin Albums (Billboard)	23
US Tropical Albums (Billboard)	7
