= Adolfo Cano =

Mexican entrepreneur

- Born: 1987 (age 38–39); Mexico City
- Occupations: Digital Journalist, Entrepreneur
- Organization: Cultura Colectiva
- Website: https://culturacolectiva.com/

Adolfo Cano Contreras (Mexico City, 1987) is a Mexican communicator, entrepreneur and digital promoter. He is one of the founders of the digital platform Cultura Colectiva created in 2013 in Mexico, and chairman of the board of directors.

== Development ==
With a background in marketing, he is one of the Mexican pioneers of communication based on technology and entertainment. The Cultura Colectiva platform reached a growth of 500% per year in a short time.

The digital platform emerged as a way to spread the cultural and artistic life arising from the parties that he organized in partnership with Jorge del Villar and Luis Enriquez, the other founding partners. In those days they were able to bring together a good atmosphere, lights, music, DJ, drinks, guests and muralists painting live. They noticed that there was no media aimed at young people and focused on the dissemination of Mexican talent in art and culture. So they decided to take the plunge, each investing 25,000 pesos.

The early project was disperse in different lines of business: parties, a restaurant, an art gallery, an online store and artistic workshops that promoted culture and creativity. Everything produced contents for the digital project, which was already being posted on social networks such as Facebook and Twitter, but it was not profitable.

In 2014 they were on the verge of closing and solved the business feasibility by focusing on its digital dimension. They created the website and continued with the spread on social networks.

Cano was able to turn Cultura Colectiva into one of the most influential digital media in Mexico. Among the successes is being the first digital media to interview the President of Mexico, Enrique Peña Nieto. He has been one of the pioneers in the dissemination of Latin American culture and emerging art in digital media, allowing their interaction. Using artificial intelligence, he created content tailored to the Internet user's tastes, to which he added a good headline and photographs, achieving an emotional communication.

As a speaker, he has participated in prominent events promoting digital culture in Mexico and the United States, such as Harvard University's Mexico Conference 2.0. He was also one of the 30 entrepreneurs of the future chosen by Forbes in 2016.

In 2017 he got the Dalus Mexico II fund to invest in the Cultura Colectiva platform 72.4 million pesos, accounting for 15% of the capital. The expansion of the platform has achieved great development among Latin American audiences in the United States, where they also opened headquarters in New York.

=== Audiovisual Production ===
The next step was audiovisual production, with series of five minutes and no more than ten chapters, in association with Argos Comunicación. The platform receives 36.3 million unique visits per month in 2021 and is on the same level as The New York Times and The Guardian in terms of video views, with 700 million video views per month.

Cano thinks that digital journalism must reinvent itself with digital in order not to die and acquire the strength we need to consume it. He believes that change is necessary and that many times it is fear that prevents progress, "you have to unlearn to understand what happens in digital and social networks. It is a time when you have to stop being afraid and try more networks".

=== Tegger ===
Cano is the founder of the company "Tegger", a startup for the collection of data that pays for this information and that has been including many companies of the Mexican digital economy and the platform Cultura Colectiva itself. By requesting explicit permission from the users of its platform or other browsing spaces, the data is obtained and remunerated with cryptocurrencies.

=== NZT Capital ===
In 2021 Adolfo Cano founded NZT Capital, a company that provides information about the world of cryptocurrencies and virtual assets.
