= Charlie Zaa =

Colombian musician (born 1974)

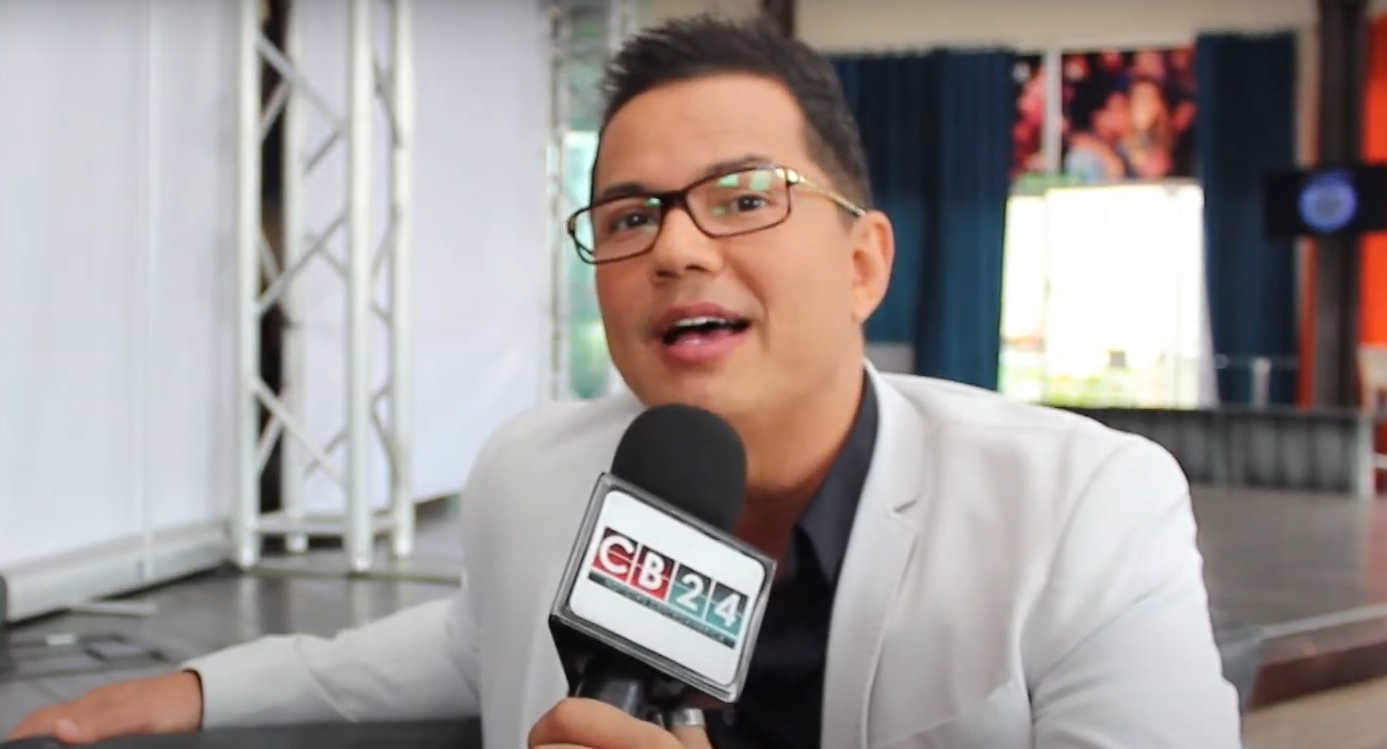
- Charlie Zaa in 2017

Background information
- Also known as: Charlie Zaa
- Born: Carlos Alberto Sánchez; January 30, 1974 (age 52)
- Origin: Girardot, Colombia
- Genres: Salsa, Bachata, Bolero
- Instruments: Singing, Guitar
- Years active: 1996–present
- Labels: Sonolux (1996-2001); Ole Music (2002-2005); Zaa Latino (2009-)

Carlos Alberto Sánchez (born in Girardot, Colombia, January 30, 1974), known professionally as Charlie Zaa, is a Colombian singer. Zaa is the son of singer Luis Humberto Sánchez.

== Early and personal life ==
Zaa was a singer in two Colombian salsa orchestras: "Grupo Niche" and "Orquesta Guayacán". When he launched his career as a solo artist in the mid-1990s, he switched to a bolero rhythm.

On July 23, 2004, Zaa suffered from severe abdominal pain as he was about to begin a concert in Ponce, Puerto Rico. He couldn't perform that day and was taken to a local hospital. Zaa was then flown to Miami, Florida, where he was hospitalized with a kidney condition. His personal doctor corrected the problem in a surgery performed in his native Colombia.

Zaa's daughter Lauren Mia Sanchez was a survivor of the 2018 Stoneman Douglas High School shooting in which 17 people lost their lives, including one of her teachers.

== Music career ==
Charlie Zaa has recorded over 10 albums since launching his career as a solo artist. His record Sentimientos, in which he sings some past hit songs, sold over three million copies throughout Latin America and the United States. His albums Sentimientos and Un Segundo Sentimiento led to him winning the 1998 Artist of the Year award at the Billboard Latin Music Awards. For his fourth album, Zaa returned to the Sonolux studios in Bogotá, where he made his first album Sentimiento, and to his original producer, Milton Salcedo, and recorded old romantic standards, boleros and waltzes, in an attempt to replicate the success of Sentimiento. Zaa's album De Un Solo Sentimiento was nominated for a Latin Grammy Award in 2002. In 2011, Zaa's album De Bohemia reached the top of the Billboard Latin Albums chart. Some of Charlie Zaa's music was inspired by notable Ecuadorian singer and recording artist Julio Jaramillo.

== Discography ==
- Sentimientos (1996)
- Un Segundo Sentimiento (1998)
- Ciego de Amor (2000)
- De Un Solo Sentimiento (2001)
- Puro Sentimiento (2004)
- De Bohemia (2011)
- Mi Mejor Regalo (2015)
- Celebración (2017)
