= Cultura Colectiva =

Mexico-based digital media publisher

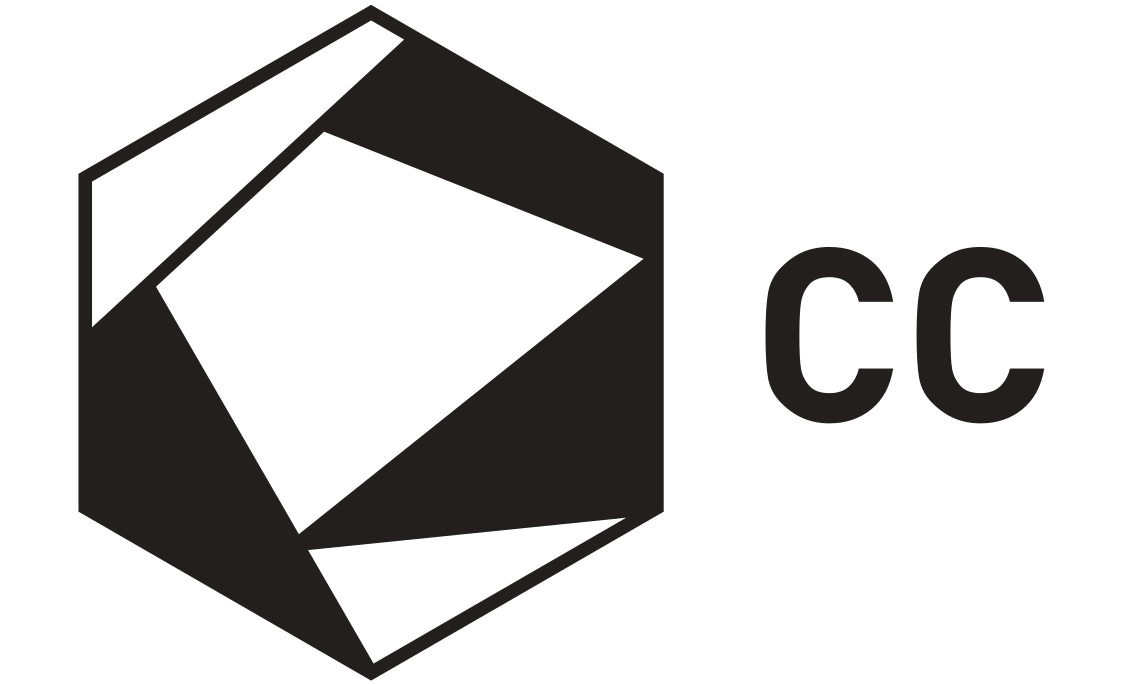
- Industry: Digital Media
- Founded: October 23, 2013; 11 years ago in Mexico City
- Founder: Luis Enríquez, Adolfo Cano and Jorge Del Villar
- Headquarters: Cuauhtémoc, Mexico City, Mexico
- Website: culturacolectiva.com/en/

Cultura Colectiva is a Mexico-based digital media publisher. It publishes content designed to be shared over social media networks targeted at a Latin American audience. It currently ranks third among the most read digital native media publishers in Mexico and one of the 10 most important in Latin America. The CEO of Cultura Colectiva is Luis Andrés Enríquez.

== History ==
The company was founded in 2013 in Mexico City by Jorge del Villar, Adolfo Cano and Luis Enríquez. It started as a community on Facebook under the name “Cultura Colectiva”. They launched Cultura Colectiva Plus, a Facebook page publishing content in English aimed at an audience in the US in 2016.

In August 2017, Cultura Colectiva gained recognition after they became the first website to conduct an interview with the Mexican president Enrique Peña Nieto. As of January 2018, Cultura Colectiva’s platforms have gained over 30mn followers and the website receives 70mn monthly visits with half of its users coming from Mexico and the other half from Latin America and the United States. In December 2017, the company opened their office in New York.

=== Funding ===
In July 2017, Dalus Capital acquired 15% of the company in a deal worth 72.4mn pesos (~$4mn).

== Content ==
The content generated is based on algorithms that predict the sharing likelihood of each piece. Cultura Colectiva has employed a team of 10 data scientists to use technology to facilitate business decisions.

In 2017, the company worked with Argos to produce three web series – Rest in peace, Top Ten, and Hotel Victoria.
