= Francisco Céspedes =

Cuban musician

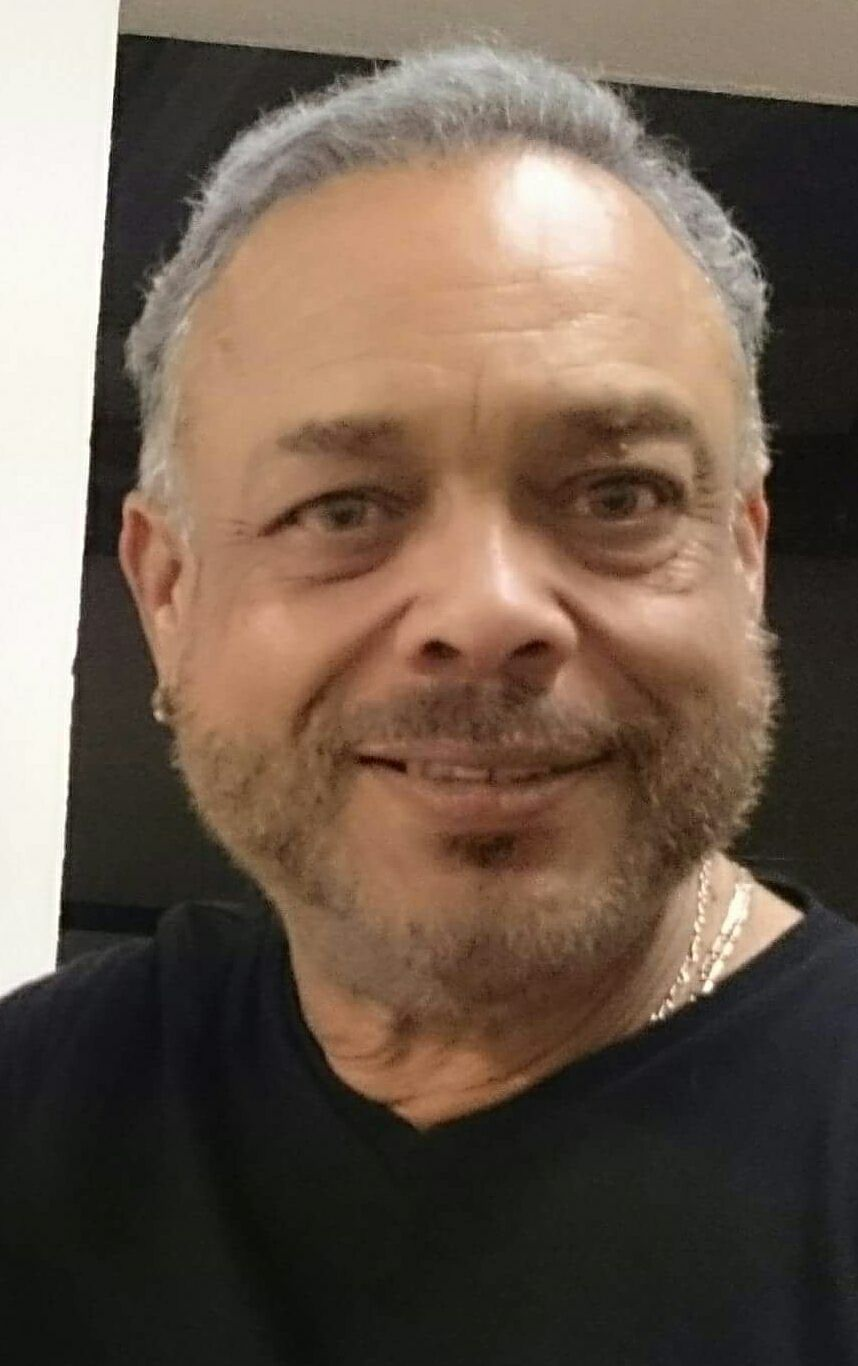

Background information
- Birth name: Francisco Fabián Céspedes Rodríguez
- Also known as: Pancho
- Born: February 28, 1957 (age 68); Santa Clara, Cuba
- Genres: Bolero
- Occupations: Musician; singer; songwriter
- Instruments: Vocals; guitar
- Years active: 1980s–present
- Website: franciscocespedes.com

Francisco Fabián Céspedes Rodríguez, also known as Pancho Céspedes (born 28 February 1957) is a Grammy-nominated Cuban musician, singer and songwriter. Born in Santa Clara, Cuba, Céspedes is a naturalized Mexican citizen. He is most known for his 1998 song, "Vida Loca".

== Career ==
Céspedes left his physician career to get involved in the romantic music movement called "feeling" (bolero and jazz mixed in Cuba). After his arrival in Mexico in 1993, Luis Miguel included Céspedes's authored song "Pensar en ti" on the album Aries, which was his international debut as a composer. Luis Miguel would collaborate with him again in 1996 with the song "Qué tú te vas" from the album Nada es Igual.

Céspedes made his debut as a soloist singer and songwriter in 1997 with the song "Hablo de ti", which was Mexico's entry for that year's Festival de Viña del Mar. He was awarded the second prize and helped Céspedes to record his first soloist album Vida loca in 1998. The album was well-received in Mexico, Spain, the United States, Peru and Chile as "fully loaded with love and sensibility".

In 2000, his album ¿Dónde está la vida? reached Platinum disc sales in Mexico, of which the eponymous single was used in the soundtrack of Mexican telenovela La casa en la playa.

In 2004, Céspedes released Dicen que el alma / Grandes Éxitos, a greatest hits album, which included two new titles: "Dicen que el alma" and "Lloviendo ausencia". Included as bonus tracks are the songs "Remolino" with Ana Belén, and "Vida loca" with Milton Nascimento.

In 2006, Céspedes made a tribute album to Ignacio "Bola de Nieve" Villa titled Con el permiso de Bola. Songs include "Ay Amor", "Vete De Mí", "No Puedo Ser Feliz", "Drume Negrita" and "Adiós Felicidad". The album was nominated to a Grammy Award in 2007, in the same year his compilation album earned an award at the Latin Pride National Awards.

== Discography ==
- Vida Loca (1997)
- ¿Dónde Está la Vida? (2000)
- ...Ay Corazón (2002)
- Dicen Que el Alma (2004)
- Autorretrato (2005)
- Con el Permiso de Bola (2006)
- Te Acuerdas... (2009)
- Más Cerca de ti (2011)
- Armando Un Pancho, collaboration with Armando Manzanero (2012)
- Más cerca de ti (En vivo), (2011)
- Todavía, (2015)
