= Servando & Florentino =

Venezuelan musical sibling duo

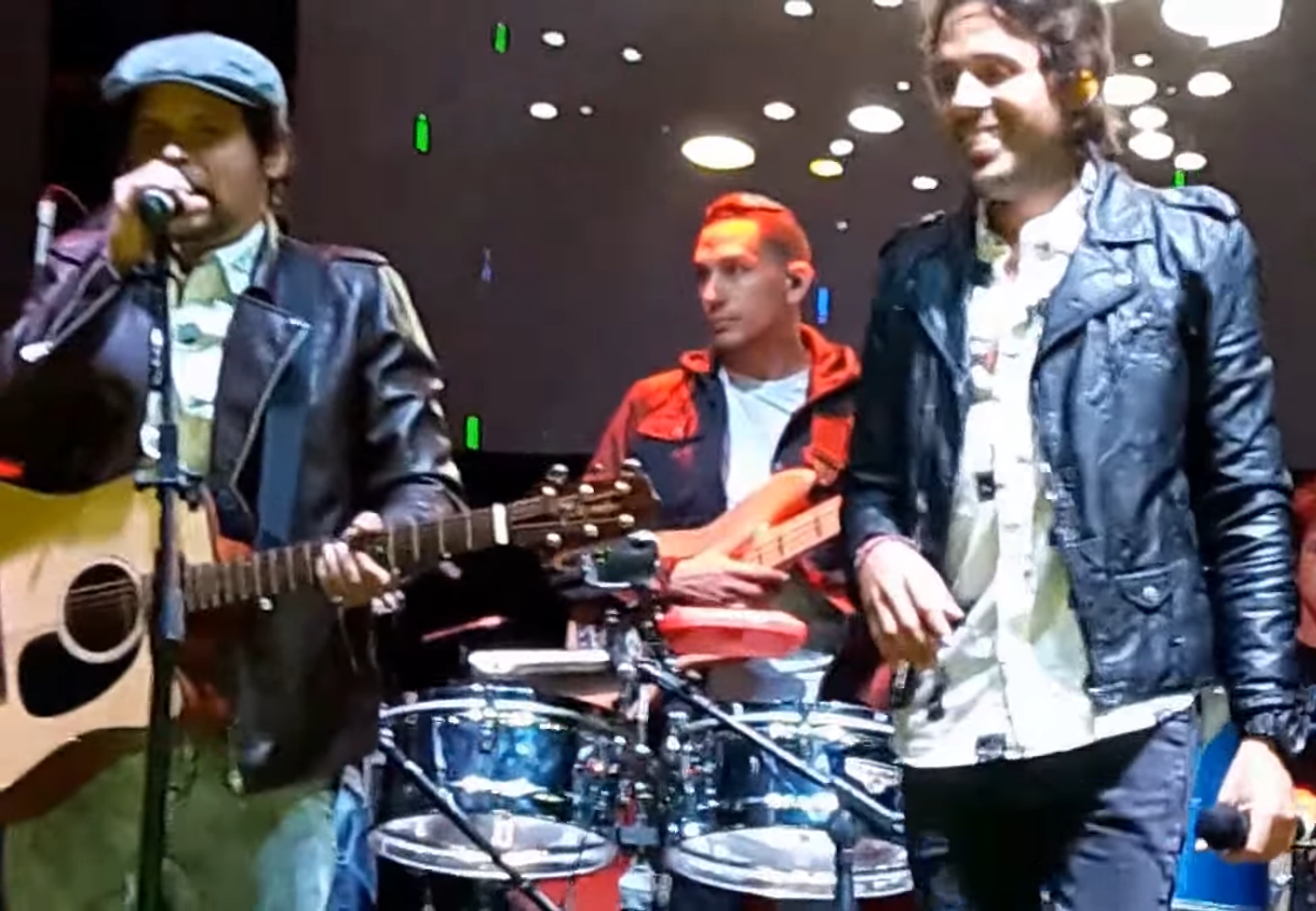
- Servando & Florentino in 2015

Background information
- Origin: Caracas, Venezuela
- Genres: Salsa, Latin pop
- Years active: 1997–present
- Labels: WEA Latina (1997-1999); Sony (2000–2004); Universal (2004-actualidad)
- Members: Servando Primera; Florentino Primera

Servando & Florentino is a Venezuela music duo consisting of brothers Servando Primera (born 27 August 1980) and Florentino Primera (born 31 August 1981). They are sons of Venezuelan musician and activist Alí Primera, who died in 1985. They began their music career as part of the salsa band Salserín and left the group in 1997. In the same year, they released their debut album, Los Primera, which contained the lead single, "Una Fan Enamorada". The song topped the Hot Latin Songs and Tropical Airplay charts in the United States. The duo received three Lo Nuestro nominations for "Tropical/Salsa Duo or Group of the Year", "New Tropical/Salsa Artist of the Year", and "Tropical/Salsa Song of the Year" for "Una Fan Enamorada" in 1999. Their album, Los Primera, was nominated at the 1999 Latin Billboard Music Awards for "Tropical/salsa album of the year, duo or group" and "Tropical/salsa album of the year, new artist".

== Discography ==
Discography taken from AllMusic:

- Los Primera (1997)
- Muchacho Solitario (1999)
- Paso a Paso (2000)
- Servando y Florentino (2006)
- Se Acabo (2010)
