= Contra la Corriente (song) =

- CD single

Single by Marc Anthony

from the album Contra la Corriente
- Released: 1998
- Studio: Altamar Music (San Juan, Puerto Rico); Unique Recording (New York City)
- Genre: Salsa
- Length: 5:13
- Label: RMM
- Songwriter: Omar Alfanno
- Producers: Marc Anthony; Angel "Cuco" Peña

Marc Anthony singles chronology
"No Me Conoces" (1998)	"Contra la Corriente" (1998)	"I Want to Spend My Lifetime Loving You" (1998)

"Contra la Corriente" (transl. "Against the Current") is a song by American singer Marc Anthony from his third studio album of the same name (1997). It was released in 1998 by RMM and served as the album's fifth single. The song was written by Omar Alfanno, with co-production handled by Ángel "Cucco" Peña and Anthony. "Contra la Corriente" is a salsa song, that lyrically recalls a "good love from the past."

"Contra la Corriente" was praised by music critics and was nominated in the category of Tropical Song of the Year at the 11th Annual Lo Nuestro Awards and the 6th Annual Latin Billboard Music Awards in 1999. Commercially, it reached number two on the Billboard Hot Latin Songs in the United States and topped the Tropical Airplay chart where it spent four weeks at this position. Puerto Rican singer Ángel López covered this song as a ballad on his studio album Historias de Amor (2010).

== Background and composition ==
By 1996, Marc Anthony's studio albums, Otra Nota (1993) and Todo a Su Tiempo (1995), both released by RMM, had sold over 600,000 copies combined. Sergio George, who produced both albums, had left RMM to establish his own record label and was working with his own artists. As a result, George was unable to produce Anthony's next record. Puerto Rican musician Angel "Cucco" Peña took up the position as the co-producer for Anthony's third studio album Contra la Corriente (1997). As Anthony was involved with the production of The Capeman (1998), he recorded in New York and Puerto Rico and took three weeks to complete Contra la Corriente.

Omar Alfanno, who composed three tracks on Todo a Su Tiempo, wrote five tracks for Contra la Corriente including the title track. The song begins with an acoustic guitar before transitioning into a "medium-paced salsa rhythm", according to The San Diego Union-Tribune editor Ernesto Portillo, Jr. In the lyrics, Diana Raquel of La Prensa de San Antonio noted that the track "nostalgically evokes the memory of a good love from the past."

== Promotion and reception ==
The title track was released as the fifth single from Contra la Corriente in 1998. A truncated version of the song was released on Anthony's greatest hits album Desde un Principio: From the Beginning (1999), while the original recording was included on the compilation album Éxitos Eternos (2003). Anthony delivered a performance of the track prior to the album's release at the Madison Square Garden in New York City on October 18, 1997. He performed the song live at the same venue three years later, which was recorded for the live video album The Concert from Madison Square Garden (2001). In 2010, Puerto Rican singer Ángel López covered "Contra la Corriente" as a ballad for his studio album Historias de Amor, a collection of songs Alfanno had previously composed. López's rendition, along with the rest of the album, were arranged and produced by Alfanno.

On the review of Contra la Corriente for La Prensa de San Antonio, Diana Raquel lauded the song's "intense rhythm" and noted that the track has all the elements of a salsa romantica which progresses into a "tasty mambo". Tom Moon of The Philadelphia Inquirer complimented Anthony for adlibbing "in a loose, refreshingly offhand way". A writer for La Prensa listed it as one of Marc Anthony's best 15 songs. "Contra la Corriente" was nominated in the category of Tropical Song of the Year at the 11th Annual Lo Nuestro Awards, as well as "Tropical/Salsa Hot Track of the Year" at the 1999 Latin Billboard Music Awards. It lost both awards to Elvis Crespo's "Suavemente". Commercially "Contra la Corriente" reached number two on the Billboard Hot Latin Songs in the US, and topped the Billboard Tropical Airplay chart on the week of November 7, 1998; it remained on the spot for four weeks and became his tenth number one on the chart. It ranked number eight on the 1998 Tropical Airplay year-end chart.

== Personnel ==
Credits adapted from the Contra la Corriente liner notes.

- Omar Alfanno – songwriter
- Marc Anthony – vocals, co-producer
- Ángel Peña – arrangement, co-producer

== Charts ==
=== Weekly charts ===
Chart performance for "Contra la Corriente"
Chart (1998)	Peak position
US Hot Latin Songs (Billboard)	2
US Tropical Airplay (Billboard)	1

=== Year-end charts ===
1998 year-end chart performance for "Contra la Corriente"
Chart (1998)	Position
US Hot Latin Songs (Billboard)	25
US Tropical Airplay (Billboard)	8

== See also ==
- List of Billboard Tropical Airplay number ones of 1998
