= Gisselle discography =

List of albums and singles by Merengue singer Gisselle

This article is a listing of all of Gisselle’s albums and singles.

== Albums ==
Overview
Gisselle
First album
- Release date: August 15, 1995
- Chart positions

Top Latin albums: failed to chart

- Sales

RIAA certification: Platinum (Latin)
Worldwide: 200,000

A Que Vuelve
Second album
- Release date: October 15, 1996
- Chart positions

Top Latin albums: #26

- Sales

RIAA certification: Platinum (Latin)
Worldwide: 200,000

Quiero Estar Contigo
Third album
- Release date: October 28, 1997
- Chart positions

Top Latin albums: #28

- Sales

RIAA certification: Platinum (Latin)
Worldwide: 200,000

Juntos
First album with Sergio Vargas
- Release date: June 2, 1998
- Chart positions

Top Latin albums: #37

- Sales

RIAA certification: none
Worldwide: n/a

Atada
Fourth album
- Release date: November 10, 1998
- Chart positions

Top Latin albums: #17

- Sales

RIAA certification: Platinum (Latin)
Worldwide: 200,000

Voy a Enamorarte
Fifth album
- Release date: June 6, 2000
- Chart positions

Top Latin albums: #8

- Sales

RIAA certification: none
Worldwide: n/a

8
Sixth album
- Release date: October 9, 2001
- Chart positions

Top Latin albums: #23

- Sales

RIAA certification: none
Worldwide: n/a

En Alma, Cuerpo y Corazon
Seventh album
- Release date: October 22, 2002
- Chart positions

Top Latin albums: #32

- Sales

RIAA certification: none
Worldwide: n/a

Contra la Marea
Eighth album
- Release date: March 30, 2004
- Chart positions

Top Latin albums: failed to chart

- Sales

RIAA certification: none
Worldwide: n/a

Libre
Ninth album
- Release date: July 18, 2006
- Chart positions

Top Latin albums: #24

- Sales

RIAA certification: none
Worldwide: n/a

=== Compilations ===
Overview
Lo Mejor De
First Greatest hits album
- Release date: November 23, 1999
- Chart positions

Top Latin albums: #20

- Sales

RIAA certification: none
Worldwide: n/a

Merengue & Ritmo
First Remix album
- Release date: September 23, 2003
- Chart positions

Top Latin albums: failed to chart

- Sales

RIAA certification: none
Worldwide: n/a

10 de Coleccion
First EP album
- Release date: June 7, 2005
- Chart positions

Top Latin albums: failed to chart

- Sales

RIAA certification: none
Worldwide: n/a

Chart Accomplishments	Chart
Chart Accomplishments	Top Latin albums
Number One albums	0
Top Ten albums	1

== Singles ==
Year	Title	Chart positions			from the album
Year	Title	Hot Latin Songs	Hot Latin Pop Airplay	Latin Tropical Airplay	from the album
1995	Ya Se Que Es el Final	33	-	4	Gisselle
1995	Pesadilla	23	-	3	Gisselle
1995	Lo Mio Es Mio	16	-	2	Gisselle
1995	Esa No Es Mejor Que Yo	-	-	7	Gisselle
1996	A Que Vuelve	22	10	3	A Que Vuelve
1996	Porque Te Extrano	-	-	19	A Que Vuelve
1996	Siempre Que Pasa el Amor	-	-	13	A Que Vuelve
1996	El Negro	-	-	10	A Que Vuelve
1997	Me Pasa Lo Mismo	23	10	3	A Que Vuelve
1997	Quiero Estar Contigo	5	10	1	Quiero Estar Contigo
1997	Lo Quiero Olivdar	27	-	8	Quiero Estar Contigo
1997	Perdoname, Olvidalo	20	17	7	Quiero Estar Contigo
1998	Lo Quiero a Morir	-	-	16	Juntos
1998	Corazon Encadenado (with Sergio Vargas)	4	12	-	Juntos
1998	Atada	34	39	14	Atada
1998	Dame un Beso	5	9	3	Atada
1998	Huele a Peligro	9	-	2	Atada
1998	Me Decidi	40	-	14	Atada
1999	Fuego en la Cinturra	33	29	10	Lo Mejor De
2000	Júrame	1	1	1	Voy a Enamorate
2000	Que No Diera	-	-	26	Voy a Enamorate
2000	Quien Te Hace el Amor	-	26	35	Voy a Enamorate
2001	Voy a Quitarme el Anillo	19	18	6	8
2001	Boca	-	-	27	8
2001	Amar a Dos	-	-	34	8
2002	Marchate	17	8	11	En Alma, Cuerpo y Corazon
2004	No Queda Nada	-	-	27	Contra la Marea
2006	De Que Nos Vale	-	15	33	Libre

Chart Accomplishments	Chart		
Chart Accomplishments	Hot Latin Songs	Hot Latin Pop Airplay	Latin Tropical Airplay
Number One Singles	1	1	2
Top Ten Singles	5	6	15
