= The Overtake =

- Screenshot
- Website type: News and opinion website
- Available in: English
- Founded: 13 October 2017
- Dissolved: 4 February 2022
- Website: theovertake.com
- Commercial: Yes
- Registration: None
- Current status: Shut down

The Overtake was an independent British news and opinion website aimed at millennials. The website was founded in October 2017 by Robyn Vinter and is based in Leeds. Vinter was nominated for the Georgia Henry Award for Innovation at the 2017 Press Awards for her work on The Overtake.

It shut down in 2021.

== Content ==
The Overtake positioned itself as an alternative and independent media website aimed at a millennial audience. Its articles consisted of both investigative journalism pieces as well as opinion. Their investigative work was featured by The Bureau of Investigative Journalism and their opinion work has been featured by Press Gazette and The Guardian.
