= Sentimientos (album) =

Studio album by Charlie Zaa
- Released: November 19, 1996
- Recorded: November 1995 – August 1996
- Studio: Sonolux Recording Studios
- Genre: Bolero; Latin pop
- Length: 50:35
- Label: Sonolux; Sony Discos
- Producer: Rafael Henríquez; Milton Salcedo

Charlie Zaa chronology
Sentimientos (1996)	Un Segundo Sentimiento (1998)

Singles from Sentimientos
- 1. "Añoranzas: Versos a Mi Madre/Hojas de Calendario" Released: September 30, 1996; 2. "Deseos: Rondando Tu Esquina/Nuestro Juramento" Released: January 6, 1997; 3. "Sentimientos: Un Disco Más/Niégalo Todo" Released: March 10, 1997

Professional ratings
Review scores
Source	Rating
Allmusic	4.5/5 stars

Sentimientos (transl. "Feelings") is the debut studio album by Colombian Bolero singer Charlie Zaa. It was released on November 19, 1996 through Sonolux Records and Sony Discos. This album became his first number-one set on the Billboard Top Latin Albums. The album given a Premio Lo Nuestro award for "Tropical Album of the Year".

It was a success across Latin America and United States, with 4 million copies sold worldwide. Also, was certified platinum by the Recording Industry Association of America in 1999 for shipping one million copies in the United States.

== Track listing ==
The following information is from Billboard.

No.	Title	Writer(s)	Length
1.	"Sentimentos: Un Disco Más/Niégalo Todo"	Leopoldo González, Germán Rosario	5:38
2.	"Quimeras: Odiame/Te Esperaré"	Rafael Otero, Jimmy Vicenty	6:18
3.	"Deseos: Rondando Tu Esquina/Nuestro Juramento"	Cadicamo, Carlos Pérez, Benito De Jesús	5:31
4.	"Nostalgias: No Me Toquen Ese Vals/Reminiscencias"	Enrique Luis Pinto, Cuco Sánchez	4:22
5.	"Ilusiones: Cinco Centavitos/Temeridad"	Manuel Jiménez, Héctor Ulloa	5:12
6.	"Evocaciones: Para Que Se Quiere/Desde Que Te Marchaste"	Miguel Puerta, Vanegas Lloveras	5:03
7.	"Pasiones: Alma Negra/Que Dios Me Libre"	Gabriel Muñoz, John Londono, Leon De la Roca	4:25
8.	"Melancolías: Que Nadie Sepa Mi Sufrir/Aunque Me Duela el Alma"	Gastón Guerrero, Cabral	5:06
9.	"Esperanzas: La Fe Verdadera/Amémonos"	Montbum, Felipe Alva, Manuel Flores	4:26
10.	"Añoranzas: Versos a Mi Madre/Hojas de Calendario"	Angelis, Alejandro Mariscotil, Roberto Arrieta, Carlos Ulloa	4:34

== Personnel ==
- Milton Salcedo – arranger
- Hugo Gutiérrez – director
- Rafael Henriquez – engineer, mixing
- Liliana Parra – violin
- Jorge Ramirez – bass, piano, mixing
- Sady Ramírez – percussion, programming, mixing
- Luis Maria Diaz – viola
- Valentin Diaz – violin
- Gabriel Randón – guitar
- Hans Rincón – violoncello
- Carlos Sanchez – vocals
- Marcos Silva – assistant
- Ernesto Simpson – synthesizer, drums
- Germán Villareal – banjo, conga
- Jorge Gamboa – photography
- Rubén Datio Dagura – design

== Chart performance ==
Chart (1997)	Peak position
US Billboard Top Latin Albums	1
US Billboard Tropical/Salsa Albums	1
US Billboard Top Heatseekers	15
US Billboard 200	185

== Certifications and sales ==
Region	Certification	Certified units/sales
Argentina (CAPIF)	Platinum	120,000
Colombia	8× Platinum	1,000,000
Ecuador	3× Platinum	
Mexico (AMPROFON)	Platinum+6× Gold	600,000
United States (RIAA)	Platinum	1,000,000^{^}
Venezuela	Platinum	
Summaries
Central America	—	170,000
Worldwide	—	4,000,000
^{^} Shipments figures based on certification alone.

== See also ==
- List of number-one Billboard Top Latin Albums from the 1990s
- List of number-one Billboard Tropical Albums from the 1990s
- List of best-selling Latin albums
