= Vida Loca =

Studio album by Francisco Céspedes
- Released: August 1997
- Studios: Estudio 19 (Mexico City, Mexico)
- Genre: Latin pop
- Length: 39:16
- Language: Spanish
- Label: WEA Latina

Francisco Céspedes chronology
Vida Loca (1997)	Donde Está la Vida (2000)

Singles from Vida Loca
- 1. "Se me Antoja" Released: 1997; 2. "Señora" Released: 1998; 3. "Vida Loca" Released: 1998; 4. "Remolino" Released: 1999

Professional ratings
Review scores
Source	Rating
AllMusic	4/5 stars

Vida Loca (transl. Crazy Life) is the first studio album by Cuban singer-songwriter Francisco Céspedes, released in August 1997 by WEA Latina. In Spain the album was awarded with an Amigo Award for the best Latin album. It was nominated for Pop Album of the Year by a New Artist at the 1999 Billboard Latin Music Awards, but lost to Carlos Ponce. By June 2000, the record had sold over 1.5 million copies worldwide.

== History ==
In August 1997 Céspedes released his debut album, and the first single "Se me Antoja". The album languished selling no more than 10,000 copies by year's end. The things changed when network TV Azteca held a contest to find the title track for a new soap, Señora. Céspedes submitted a song written specifically for that purpose, and out of hundreds, it got picked. "Señora," the song, became the title track of Señora, the soap, and it was added as a bonus track to Vida Loca in the second edition, the single sold 10,000 copies in Mexico. By year's end, the album had sold 180,000 copies in Mexico alone, and Cespedes was on his way to becoming an international star.

After seeing Céspedes perform in Mexico City, Alejandro Sanz persuaded Warner Music Spain president Saul Tagarro to promote Céspedes' CD "Vida Loca" in Spain. By mid-December 1998, "Vida Loca" had sold 350,000 units, and was eventually awarded with five platinum certifications by PROMUSICAE for shipping over 500,000 copies. In addition, Cespedes, won one Premio Ondas and three Amigo Awards, including one for the best Latin album.

== Track listing ==
All tracks are written by Francisco Céspedes, except where noted.

No.	Title	Writer(s)	Length
1.	"Todo es un Misterio"		3:43
2.	"Como si el Destino"		3:53
3.	"Vida Loca"		3:13
4.	"Remolino"	Amaury Gutiérrez	4:08
5.	"Pensar en Ti"		4:08
6.	"Tú por que"		3:46
7.	"Se me Antoja"		3:07
8.	"Que Hago Contigo"		3:31
9.	"Morena"	Gutiérrez	3:40
10.	"Vida Vida"		2:45
11.	"Señora"		3:22
Total length:			39:16

== Personnel ==
Adapted from the Vida Loca liner notes:

=== Performance credits ===
- Waldo Madera – drums, percussion
- Agustin Bernal – double bass
- Raúl del Sol – acoustic piano (tracks 2, 4, 7, 9), chorus
- Eugenio Toussaint – acoustic piano (tracks 1, 5–6)
- Jorge Aragón – acoustic piano (tracks 3, 8)
- Fernando Otero – piano (track 11)
- Dean Parks – steel acoustic guitar
- Freddy Ramos – nylon acoustic guitar
- Gil Gutiérrez – guitar
- Chilo Morán – trumpet (track 2)
- Fernando Acosta – saxophone
- Yomo Toro – cuatro (track 4)
- Alcira Herrera – chorus
- Maryori González – chorus
- Elizabeth Meza – chorus
- Pancho – chorus
- Aneiro – chorus
- Silantiva Vera – strings
- Jorge Deletze – strings
- Bozena Slawinska – strings
- Matthew Paul Schubring – strings
- Viktoria Horti – strings
- Naomi Eve Brickman – strings
- Abraham Mayer – strings
- Vladimir Tokarev – strings

=== Technical credits ===
- Juan Carlos Paz y Puente – executive producer, direction A&R
- Aneiro Taño – co-producer, arrangements
- Salvador Tercero – engineer, mixing engineer
- Raúl Durand – assistant
- Jean B. Smit – mixing engineer
- Andy Richter – assistant
- Leon Zervos – mastering engineer
- Ron McMaster – mastering engineer (track 11)
- Eugenio Toussaint – arrangements
- Manolo González Loyola – arrangements
- Mark Kamins – direction A&R
- Edgar Ladrón de Guevara – photography
- Jessica Fallon – graphic design
- Lidia Salazar – coordination in Mexico
- Laura Cárdenas – coordination in Mexico
- Maricela Valencia – coordination in Mexico
- Nina Swan – coordination in Los Angeles
- Freddy Ramos – coordination in Los Angeles
- Raúl Ortega Alfonso – exergues

=== Recording and mixing locations ===
- Estudio 19, Mexico City – recording
- Westlake Recording Studios – Studio A, Los Angeles, CA – mixing
- Mad Hatter Studios, Los Angeles, CA – mixing (track 11)
- Absolute Audio – mastering
- Capitol Mastering, Los Angeles, CA – mastering (track 11)

== Charts ==
=== Weekly charts ===
Weekly chart performance for Vida Loca
Chart (1998)	Peak position
European Albums (Music & Media)	57
Spanish Albums (AFYVE)	3

=== Year-end charts ===
Year-end chart performance for Vida Loca
Chart (1998)	Peak position
Spanish Albums (AFYVE)	10

Chart (1999)	Peak position
Spanish Albums (AFYVE)	30

== Sales and certifications ==
Region	Certification	Certified units/sales
Colombia	Gold	30,000
Mexico (AMPROFON)	Platinum+Gold	350,000^{^}
Spain (Promusicae)	5× Platinum	500,000^{^}
United States (RIAA)	Platinum (Latin)	100,000^{^}
Summaries
Worldwide	—	1,500,000
^{^} Shipments figures based on certification alone.
