= Puro Sentimiento =

Studio album by Charlie Zaa
- Released: September 24, 2004
- Genre: Bolero
- Length: 36:31
- Label: Ole Music
- Producer: Jused Gallo Castañeda, William "Gigi" Romo Martínez, Charlie Zaa

Charlie Zaa chronology
De un Solo Sentimiento (2002)	Puro Sentimiento (2004)	Bachata con Puro Sentimiento (2005)

Puro Sentimiento is a 2004 studio album by Colombian singer Charlie Zaa. On this album, Zaa had a chance to sing with his father Luis Humberto Sanchez on "Soñar y Nada Mas".

== Track listing ==
1. Llora Corazón
2. Fatalidad - Perdón Por Adorarte
3. Senderito de Amor
4. Ni Me Llaman Ni Me Escriben
5. Navidad
6. Traicionera - Pesares
7. Lamparilla
8. Como Una Sombra
9. Pobre Novia - En Ese Mas Allá
10. Soñar y Nada Mas

== Charts ==
Chart (2004)	Peak position
US Latin Pop Albums (Billboard)	5
US Top Latin Albums (Billboard)	38
