= Un Segundo Sentimiento =

Studio album by Charlie Zaa
- Released: May 26, 1998
- Genre: Bolero
- Length: 52:20
- Label: Sonolux
- Producer: Charlie Zaa

Charlie Zaa chronology
Sentimientos (1997)	Un Segundo Sentimiento (1998)	Remixes (1999)

Singles from Un Segundo Sentimiento
- 1. "Desengaños" Released: August 1998; 2. "Sensaciones" Released: August 1998; 3. "Amores" Released: February 1999; 4. "Donde Esta El Amor" Released: April 2000

Professional ratings
Review scores
Source	Rating
Allmusic	4/5 stars

Un Segundo Sentimiento (A Second Feeling) is the title of a studio album recorded by Colombian performer Charlie Zaa. This album became his second number-one set on the Billboard Tropical Albums chart.

== Track listing ==
This information adapted from Allmusic.

No.	Title	Writer(s)	Length
1.	"Sensaciones: Tu duda y la mía/Azabache"	Claudio Ferrer, Julio Villafuerte	4:52
2.	"Recuerdos: Sombras/El traje blanco"	Carlos Brito, Rosario Sansores, Héctor Ulloa	4:17
3.	"Sueños: En mi viejo San Juan/Lamento Borincano"	Noel Estrada, Rafael Hernández Marín	5:15
4.	"Tentaciones: No me quieras tanto/Perfidia"	Alberto Domínguez, Rafael Hernández	4:27
5.	"Anhelos: Me voy pa'l pueblo/Ahora seremos felices"	Rafael Hernández, Mercedes Váldez	5:26
6.	"Traiciones: Sin Un Querer/Ándate"	J. Cuadros, Víctor, Abel Visconti	4:13
7.	"Promesas: Contigo/Triunfamos"	Federico Baena, Rafael Cárdenas, Claudio Estrada	3:58
8.	"Desengaños: Derrumbres/Por que eres así"	Teddy Ferreiro, Tony Ferreiro, Teddy Fregoso	5:45
9.	"Amores: Esclavo y amo/Entrega total"	José Florez, Abelardo Pulido	3:59
10.	"Verdades: Soñar un cariño/No es que me arrepienta"	Eladio Blazquez, Rubira Infante	5:23
11.	"Pensamientos: Caminemos/Rayito de luna"	Alfredo Gil, Chucho Navarro	4:45

== Chart performance ==
Chart (1998)	Peak position
U.S. Billboard Top Latin Albums	2
U.S. Billboard Tropical Albums	1
U.S. Billboard Heatseekers Albums	11
U.S. Billboard 200	193

== Sales and certifications ==
Region	Certification	Certified units/sales
Argentina (CAPIF)	Gold	30,000^{^}
Mexico (AMPROFON)	2× Gold	200,000^{^}
United States (RIAA)	4× Platinum (Latin)	400,000^{^}
^{^} Shipments figures based on certification alone.

== See also ==
- List of number-one Billboard Tropical Albums from the 1990s
