= Ironías =

Studio album by Víctor Manuelle
- Released: May 12, 1998
- Recorded: 1997–1998
- Studio: AQ-30 Studio, Nueva York; Power Light Studio, Puerto Rico; Skylight Studios, Puerto Rico
- Genre: Salsa
- Length: 44:17
- Label: Sony Discos
- Producer: Ramón Sánchez; Víctor Manuelle

Víctor Manuelle chronology
A Pesar de Todo (1997)	Ironías (1998)	Inconfundible (1999)

Singles from Ironias
- 1. "Se Me Rompe el Alma" Released: 1998; 2. "Qué Habría Sido de Mí" Released: 1998; 3. "Que Te Han Dicho" Released: 1999; 4. "Al Igual Que Yo" Released: 1999

Professional ratings
Review scores
Source	Rating
Allmusic	3.5/5 stars
Orlando Sentinel	4/5 stars

Ironías (transl. "Ironies") is the fifth studio album by Puerto Rican salsero Víctor Manuelle. Released in 1998, Ironías was successful in both the Top Latin Albums and Tropical Albums peaking at #4 and #1 respectively.

== Singles ==
Three singles were produced for the album. The first single Se Me Rompe el Alma (It Breaks My Heart) peaked #1 on the Latin Tropical Airplay charts and #3 on Hot Latin Tracks. The second single, Que Habria Sido de Mi (What Would Be of Me), peaked #1 on Latin Tropical Airplay and #5 on Hot Latin Tracks. The third single, Que Te Han Dicho (What I've told you) only peaked #16 on Latin Tropical Airplay and #35 on Hot Latin Tracks.

== Track listing ==
1. Se Me Rompe el Alma - 4:56
2. Qué Habría Sido de Mi - 4:52
3. Y Después de Nuevos Amigos - 5:10
4. Mentiras - 4:53
5. Al Igual Que Yo - 5:07
6. La Dueña de Mis Amores - 5:01
7. Qué Te Han Dicho - 5:04
8. Hay Cariño - 4:24
9. No Te Desprecio - 4:50

== Charts ==
Chart (1998)	Peak position
US Top Latin Albums (Billboard)	4
US Tropical Albums (Billboard)	1
US Heatseekers Albums (Billboard)	12

== See also ==
- List of number-one Billboard Tropical Albums from the 1990s
