= 1997 in Latin music =

This is a list of notable events in Latin music (i.e. music from the Spanish- and Portuguese-speaking areas Latin America, Europe, and the United States) that took place in 1997.

== Events ==
- February 26 – The 39th Annual Grammy Awards are held at the Madison Square Garden in New York City.
  - Enrique Iglesias wins the Grammy Award for Best Latin Pop Performance for his self-titled album.
  - Rubén Blades wins the Grammy Award for Best Tropical Latin Performance for his album La Rosa de los Vientos.
  - La Mafia wins the Grammy Award for Best Mexican-American/Tejano Music Performance for their album Un Millón de Rosas.
  - Paquito D'Rivera wins the Grammy Award for Best Latin Jazz Performance for his album Portraits of Cuba.
- April 28–30 – The 8th annual Billboard Latin Music Conference is held in Miami, Florida.
  - The 4th Annual Billboard Latin Music Awards are also held and Colombian singer Shakira becomes the biggest winner with three wins. Mexican singer José José is inducted into the Billboard Latin Music Hall of Fame.
- May 8 – The 9th Annual Lo Nuestro Awards are held at the James L. Knight Center in Miami, Florida. Spanish singer Enrique Iglesias is the biggest winner with three awards.
- June 21 – The National Academy of Recording Arts and Sciences (NARAS) announces the creation of the Latin Academy of Recording Arts & Sciences (LARAS). The organization was created to expand NARAS's operations in Latin America and Spain. Mauricio Abaroa is appointed as the executive director of LARAS.
- September 5 – Spanish singer-songwriter Alejandro Sanz releases his fifth studio album Más. The album would go on to become the best-selling album of all-time in Spain.
- September 10 – SESAC launches its own Latin Music Awards to honor Latin songwriters signed under the publisher.
- November 29 – "Y Hubo Alguien" by Marc Anthony becomes the first salsa song to top the Hot Latin Songs chart in the US.

== Bands formed ==
- Frankie Negrón (salsa)
- Jordi (Latin pop)

== Bands disbanded ==
- Bronco

== Number-ones albums and singles by country ==
- List of number-one albums of 1997 (Spain)
- List of number-one singles of 1997 (Spain)
- List of number-one Billboard Top Latin Albums of 1997
- List of number-one Billboard Hot Latin Tracks of 1997

== Awards ==
- 1997 Premio Lo Nuestro
- 1997 Billboard Latin Music Awards
- 1997 Tejano Music Awards

== Albums released ==
=== First quarter ===
==== January ====
Day	Title	Artist	Genre(s)	Singles	Label
14	Con Amor y Con Sabor	Fito Olivares			EMI Latin
21	Te Sigo Esperando	Brenda K. Starr		"Herida" "No Necesito"	Teen Internacional
28	La Pipa de la Paz	Aterciopelados		"No Necesito" "Platónico" "La Pipa de la Paz"	BMG Ariola De Colombia S.A.

==== February ====
Day	Title	Artist	Genre(s)	Singles	Label
11	Dale Aborigen	Todos Tus Muertos	Reggae, Hardcore, Punk, Dub		Todos Tus Muertos Discos
11	Hands of Rhythm	Giovanni Hidalgo			RMM Records, TropiJazz
11	El Maquinista	Los Rieleros del Norte			
25	Me Dicen El Tirador	Ezequiel Peña	Ranchera, Mariachi		Musivisa
28	Só Prá Contrariar (1997)	Só Prá Contrariar	Samba		RCA Victor
Unknown Day	Homenaje a Los Grandes Grupos	Bronco	Cumbia, Norteno, Ballad		FonoVisa
Unknown Day	Muy Dentro de Mi Corazón	Alejandro Fernández	Mariachi		Sony Music

==== March ====
Day	Title	Artist	Genre(s)	Singles	Label
4	La Ultima Huella	Bronco	Cumbia, Norteno		FonoVisa
4	En Concierto, Vol. II	Los Temerarios			
11	De Nueva Cuenta	Los Incomparables de Tijuana			
11	Persona Ideal	Adolescent's Orquesta	Salsa		Korta Records
12	Atrapados En Azul	Ismael Serrano	Acoustic, Soft Rock		Polydor
18	Te Quiero, Te Amo, Te Extraño	Banda Los Largos			
18	Aldeia	Banda Mantiqueira	Big Band		ACT World Jazz, Pau Brasil
25	Canta Conmigo (1997)	La Diferenzia			Arista Latin
25	Tuya	Graciela Beltrán	Ranchera		EMI Latin
25	Secada	Jon Secada	Pop rock, Soft Rock, Downtempo		SBK Records

=== Second quarter ===
==== April ====
Day	Title	Artist	Genre(s)	Singles	Label
1	El Poder de New York	Raul Acosta y Oro Solido			
8	Adolescente y Bonita	Grupo Pegasso			
8	Amor Fingido	Grupo Pegasso			
8	Mi Encuentro	Yolandita Monge			WEA Latina
15	Te Sigo Amando (soundtrack)	Various artists			
22	Tucanes de Oro...Secuestro de Amor	Los Tucanes de Tijuana			EMI Latin
22	Red Hot + Latin: Silencio = Muerte	Various artists			
22	Piel de Ángel	Lucero			Universal Music Latino
22	Y Es Facil	Los Hermanos Rosario	Merengue		Karen Records
29	Cidades e Lendas	Zé Ramalho	MPB		Ariola
29	Juntos Otra Vez	Juan Gabriel and Rocío Dúrcal			
29	Passion Dance	Herb Alpert	Latin Jazz, Smooth Jazz		Almo Records
29	Malembe	¡Cubanismo!	Salsa, Afro-Cuban, Afro-Cuban Jazz, Latin Jazz		Hannibal Records
29	Hasta Siempre	Milly y los Vecinos	Merengue		Sony Tropical

==== May ====
Day	Title	Artist	Genre(s)	Singles	Label
5	Llévame Contigo	Olga Tañón	Merengue, Salsa	"Llegó el Amor" "El Frío de Tu Adiós" "Porque No Te Encontré" "Así Es el Amor" "Serpiente Mala"	WEA Latina
5	El Descreto	Kinito Méndez			
13	Ginastera: The Three String Quartets	Cuarteto Latinoamericano	Modern		Elan Recordings
20	Con Amor Se Gana	Frankie Negrón	Salsa		WEACaribe, WEA Latina, Inc.
20	Viviendo del Futuro	Sentidos Opuestos	Hi NRG, Synth-Pop, Euro House		EMI Latin
20	Rebotando	Ilegales	Latin, Hip-House, Merengue	"El Taqui Taqui" "Sueño Contigo"	BMG U.S. Latin, Ariola
20	Si Tu No Estas	Pete Astudillo	Tejano		EMI Latin
20	Solo	Raúl di Blasio			Ariola
27	Palabra de Mujer	Mónica Naranjo	Europop	"Desátame" "Pantera en Libertad"	Sony Latin
27	Cuando Tú No Estás	El Tri	Blues rock, Rock & Roll	"Virgen Morena"	WEA
27	Con El Machete en La Mano	Zafra Negra	Merengue		J&N Records
27	De mi alma latina, Vol. 2	Plácido Domingo			

==== June ====
Day	Title	Artist	Genre(s)	Singles	Label
3	A Pesar de Todo	Víctor Manuelle	Merengue, Salsa, Bachata	"Así Es la Mujer" "Dile a Ella" "He Tratado"	Sony Tropical, Sony Tropical
3	En Tus Manos	La Mafia	Cumbia, Tejano		Sony Discos
3	Un Loco Romántico	Liberación	Ranchera, Conjunto		Disa
17	IV	Intocable	Tejano	"Eres Mi Droga" "Dónde Estás?" "Vivir Sin Ellas"	EMI Latin
17	Así Es el Amor	Grupo Bryndis	Cumbia, Ballad	"Olvidemos Nuestro Orgullo" "Asi Es el Amor"	Disa, Leader Music

=== Third quarter ===
==== July ====
Day	Title	Artist	Genre(s)	Singles	Label
1	Por Supuesto	Milly y los Vecinos	Merengue		Discos CBS International
1	Mucho barato	Control Machete		"Control Machete" "¿Comprendes Mendes?" "Asi Son Mis Dias"	PolyGram, PolyGram
1	Amor a la Mexicana	Thalía	Salsa, Latin, Synth-Pop	"Por Amor" "Mujer Latina" "Amor a la Mexicana	EMI Latin
1	Estatua de Marfil	Vicente Fernández	Ranchera		Columbia
1	Mirame	Ana Belén	Pop rock, Bolero		BMG U.S. Latin
1	Ven Por Mi	Los Nocheros	Chacarera, Zamba		EMI 100
1	Plomo revienta	Desorden Público	Ska, Merengue, Hardcore, Rocksteady, Alternative Rock, Dub		Sony Latin
8	Me Quedé Vacia	Laura Flores		"Me Quede Vacia" "El Alma No Tiene Color"	Universal
14	De Parranda Con La Banda	Banda el Recodo	Ranchera		FonoVisa
14	Desesperadamente Enamorado	Jordi			FonoVisa
15	Aqui Estoy	Jailene	Merengue		EMI Latin
29	Pa' Otro La'o	Chichí Peralta	Merengue	"Amor Narcótico" "Un Dia Mas" "Techno Son"	Caïmán Music
29	Fabulosos Calavera	Los Fabulosos Cadillacs	Experimental, Ska, Salsa, Cool Jazz, Groove Metal, Avantgarde	"El Muerto" "Calaveras y Diablitos"	BMG U.S. Latin, Ariola
29	El Chile Pelaiz	Grupo Exterminador	Norteno, Corrido		FonoVisa
29	Norteno de Corazon	Raúl Hernandez	Norteno		Fonovisa Titanio

==== August ====
Day	Title	Artist	Genre(s)	Singles	Label
5	Swing On	Dark Latin Groove	Bachata, Salsa	"La Quiero a Morir" "La Soledad" "Magdalena, Mi Amor (Quimbara)"	Sony Tropical, Sergio George Entertainment
5	Seguire	Toño Rosario	Merengue		WEA Latina
12	Tengo Fe	Carlos Vives	Vallenato		EMI Latin
12	Romances	Luis Miguel	Bachata		WEA Latina
12	Jennifer y Los Jetz	Jennifer y Los Jetz	Tejano	"Tu Castigo" "Yo Te Vi" "¿Qué Pasó?"	EMI Latin
12	Puntos Cardinales	Ana Torroja	Pop rock		Ariola, BMG U.S. Latin
12	Compas	Gipsy Kings	Flamenco		Nonesuch, Atlantic, P.E.M.
26	El Fuego de la Noche	La Barranca			Universal
26	¿Dónde Jugarán las Niñas?	Molotov	Alternative Rock, Ska		Surco, Universal
26	Al Frente de Todos	Mazz	Tejano, Conjunto		Capitol/EMI Latin
Unknown Day	Ser humano!!	Tiro de Gracia	Hip Hop, Conscious		EMI

==== September ====
Day	Title	Artist	Genre(s)	Singles	Label
2	Alta Suciedad	Andrés Calamaro	Pop rock		Gasa
2	En Mi Imperio	Ivy Queen	Reggaeton		The House Of Music
9	Más	Alejandro Sanz	Vocal, Ballad	"Y, ¿Si Fuera Ella?" "Corazón Partío" "Amiga Mía"	Wea Latina, Inc.
9	Sobre el Fuego	La India	Salsa	"Me Cansé de Ser la Otra" "Sobre el Fuego" "La Voz de la Experiencia"	RMM Records
9	Tiene Que Ser Amor	Sparx	Ballad		FonoVisa
16	Buena Vista Social Club	Buena Vista Social Club	Afro-Cuban Jazz, Bolero, Danzon, Trova, Son	"Chan Chan" "De Camino a la Vereda" "Pueblo Nuevo"	Nonesuch, World Circuit
16	A Toda Cuba le Gusta	Afro-Cuban All Stars	Afro-Cuban	"Alto Songo" "A Toda Cuba le Gusta"	Nonesuch, World Circuit
16	Introducing...Rubén González	Rubén González	Afro-Cuban Jazz	"La Engañadora" "Almendra" "Como Siento Yo"	World Circuit, Nonesuch
22	Acústico MTV	Titãs	Pop rock, Acoustic		WEA Music
23	Boleros: Por Amor y Desamor	Various artists			
23	Me Estoy Enamorando	Alejandro Fernández	Mariachi		Sony Latin
23	Evolución	Boyz II Men	Soul, Contemporary R&B		Motown
23	Llegaste a Mi Vida	Bobby Pulido	Tejano		EMI Latin
23	Te Llevas Mi Vida	Los Mismos		"Te Llevas Mi Vida" "Que Ya Te Vas" "Soy Peor Que Nada"	
23	Se Necesita un Milagro	Domingo Quiñones	Salsa		RMM Records
23	Susana Baca	Susana Baca	Folk		Luaka Bop
23	Ya No Soy El Niño Aquel	Jerry Rivera	Salsa		Sony Tropical
30	Lo Mejor de Mí	Cristian Castro	Ballad		BMG U.S. Latin
30	Una Mujer Como Yo	Albita			Crescent Moon Records, Epic
30	Marco	Marco Antonio Solís	Ballad, Ranchera, Bolero, Cumbia		FonoVisa
30	La 4 x 4	Banda Arkangel			

=== Fourth quarter ===
==== October ====
Day	Title	Artist	Genre(s)	Singles	Label
7	Live Desde el Mas Allá	Baby Rasta & Gringo	Reggaeton		The House Of Music, Sony Discos
14	Sueños Líquidos	Maná	Pop rock		Wea Latina, Inc.
21	Contra la Corriente	Marc Anthony	Salsa		RMM Records
21	Sentimientos	Grupo Límite	Tejano, Norteno, Cumbia		Rodven Discos
21	Los Reyes del Ritmo	La Makina	Vocal, Salsa, Merengue	"Nadie Se Muere" "Dulce Muchachita" "Can, Can, Can"	Sony Discos
28	Con un mismo corazón	Ana Gabriel	Vocal		Sony Discos
28	Es Así	Ricardo Montaner	Ballad		WEA Latina
28	Quiero Estar Contigo	Gisselle	Merengue	"Quiero Estar Contigo" "Atrévete"	BMG U.S. Latin, RCA
28	Eros	Eros Ramazzotti	Soft Rock	"Una Historia Importante" "Cosas de la vida (Can't Stop Thinking of You)"	BMG U.S. Latin
Unknown Day	Sobrevivendo no Inferno	Racionais MC's	Gangsta, Conscious, Thug Rap		Cosa Nostra, Cosa Nostra

==== November ====
Day	Title	Artist	Genre(s)	Singles	Label
4	Alto Honor	Grupo Manía	Merengue	"Mirala" "Que Loco" "Corazoncito" "Me Miras y Te Miro"	Sony Tropical, Sony Tropical
4	Tributo a Jose Alfredo Jimenez	Pedro Fernández	Mariachi	"Despacito" "Si Nos Dejan" "Paloma Querida"	Rodven
4	Huellas	Yuri			PolyGram
24	Historico: Banda el Recodo En Vivo	Banda el Recodo	Ranchera		Fonovisa Mexico
24	Dejame Sonar Contigo	Los Rehenes			Disa
25	Inolvidables	José Luis Rodríguez			
25	Vuelvo Contigo	Los Invasores de Nuevo León	Norteno		DLV
25	Cualquiera Puede Cantar	Los Auténticos Decadentes	Cumbia, Pop rock, Pachanga		BMG U.S. Latin

==== December ====
Day	Title	Artist	Genre(s)	Singles	Label
1	Así Como Tú	Los Tigres del Norte	Bolero, Norteno		FonoVisa
2	Pal Pueblo	Tito Rojas	Salsa		Musical Productions
9	Aqui Me Quedaré	El Coyote y Su Banda Tierra Santa			
9	Mi Charchina (El Natural)	Eddie Gonzalez	Conjunto, Tejano		Sony Discos
9	De Corazón	Gilberto Santa Rosa	Salsa		Sony Discos

=== Unknown ===
Title	Artist	Genre(s)	Singles	Label
Vivir	Enrique Iglesias	Latin Pop	"Enamorado Por Primera Vez" "Tu Vacio" "Miente"	FonoVisa, FonoVisa
Mi Gusto Es...El Mariachi	Liberación	Tejano		EMI Latin
Musica Sin Frontera	La Tropa F			
Recuerdo Especial	Michael Salgado	Tejano, Country		Discos Joey
Ven a Mi	The Barrio Boyzz	Ballad		EMI Latin
El Mundo Gira	Banda Maguey	Ranchera		FonoVisa
Habana	Roy Hargrove's Crisol	Afro-Cuban Jazz, Post Bop	"O My Seh Yeh" "Una Mas" "Afrodisia"	Verve Records
Jefe de Jefes	Los Tigres del Norte	Conjunto, Corrido, Norteno	"El Rengo del Gallo Giro"	FonoVisa
Uma Outra Estação	Legião Urbana	Pop rock, Alternative Rock, Art Rock, Folk Rock, Post-Punk		EMI, EMI
Leaning Into the Night	Ottmar Liebert	Flamenco, Contemporary Jazz, Easy Listening, Romantic		Sony Classical
Soul of the Tango	Yo-Yo Ma	Tango		Sony Classical
A Mi Gente	Emilio	Conjunto, Tejano, Country		Capitol/EMI Latin
Tributo a Juan Gabriel	Banda el Recodo			FonoVisa
Top Norteño	Los Huracanes del Norte			FonoVisa
Corazón Indomable	Camela	Euro House, Synth-Pop, Ballad		Producciones Ar
Sedução	Negritude Jr.	Samba		EMI, EMI
Acústico MTV	Gal Costa	MPB		RCA
Quebra Cabeça	Gabriel Pensador	Pop Rap		Chaos Recordings
Em Familia	Chitãozinho & Xororó	Holiday		PolyGram, Mercury
Brincadeira de Criança	Grupo Molejo	Samba		Continental EastWest
Liga Lá	Lulu Santos	Pop rock		BMG Brasil, Ariola
A Sétima Efervescência	Jupiter Apple			
Gondwana	Gondwana	Reggae, Reggae-Pop		RCA, BMG Chile S.A.
Fome	Los Tres	Alternative Rock		Columbia
Boricua Guerrero First Combat	Various artists			
Oma	El Parque	Alternative Rock, Indie Rock		Indica
Contact!	Ray Barretto and New World Spirit	Latin Jazz, Fusion		Blue Note
Nek	Nek	Euro Pop, Pop rock		Wea Latina, Inc.
Manual Prático para Festas, Bailes e Afins - Vol. 1	Ed Motta	Jazz, Soul, Pop		Universal Music

== Best-selling records ==
=== Best-selling albums ===
The following is a list of the top 10 best-selling Latin albums in the United States in 1997, according to Billboard.

Rank	Album	Artist
1	Tango	Julio Iglesias
2	Romances	Luis Miguel
3	Vivir	Enrique Iglesias
4	Siempre Selena	Selena
5	Partiendome El Alma	Grupo Límite
6	Enrique Iglesias	Enrique Iglesias
7	Dreaming of You	Selena
8	Pies Descalzos	Shakira
9	Macarena Non Stop	Los del Río
10	Compas	Gipsy Kings

=== Best-performing songs ===
The following is a list of the top 10 best-performing Latin songs in the United States in 1997, according to Billboard.

Rank	Single	Artist
1	"Te Sigo Amando"	Juan Gabriel
2	"El Destino"	Juan Gabriel and Rocío Dúrcal
3	"Ya Me Voy Para Siempre"	Los Temerarios
4	"Enamorado Por Primera Vez"	Enrique Iglesias
5	"Piensa en Mi"	Grupo Mojado
6	"Sólo en Ti"	Enrique Iglesias
7	"Así Como Te Conocí"	Marco Antonio Solís
8	"Por Debajo de la Mesa"	Luis Miguel
9	"Desesperadamente Enamorado"	Jordi
10	"Juguete"	Grupo Límite

== Births ==
- March 2 – Becky G, American Latin pop singer
- March 21 – Martina Stoessel, Argentine actress, model, singer, and dancer
- August 7 – Evaluna Montaner, Venezuelan entertainer and singer

== Deaths ==
- January 22 — Cornelio Reyna, 56, Mexican norteño singer
- February 2 — Chico Science, 30, Brazilian singer and composer and one of the founders of the manguebeat cultural movement
- August 17 — Alberto Morán, 75, Argentine tango musician
- October 24 — Luis Aguilar, 79, Mexican film and television actor and singer of the Golden Age of Mexican cinema
- October 25 — Virgilio Expósito, 73, Argentine tango composer and pianist
