= List of Billboard Tropical Airplay number ones of 1997 =

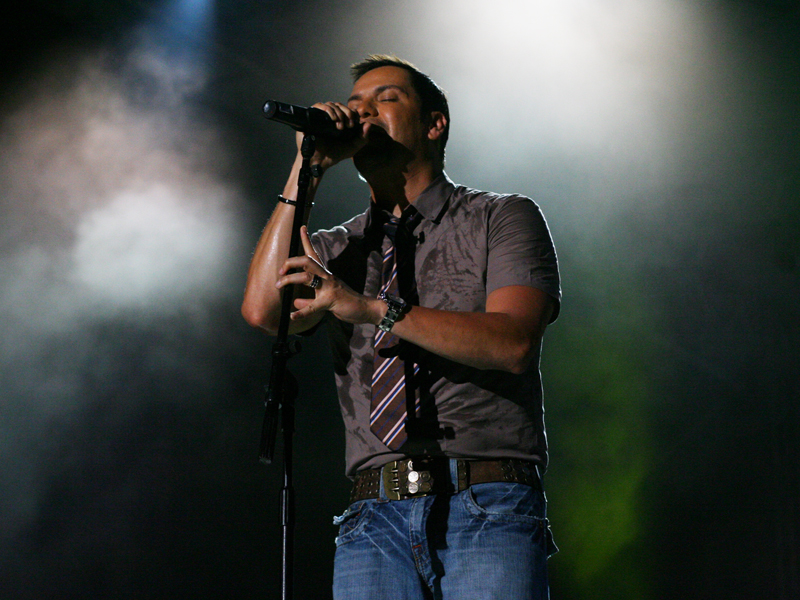
Víctor Manuelle had the longest-running number-one song of the year with "Dile a Ella".

Tropical Airplay is a chart published by Billboard magazine that ranks the top-performing songs (regardless of genre or language) on tropical radio stations in the United States, based on weekly airplay data compiled by Nielsen's Broadcast Data Systems. It is a subchart of Hot Latin Songs, which lists the best-performing Spanish-language songs in the country. In 1997, 11 songs topped the chart, in 52 issues of the magazine.

The first number one of the year was "No Quiero Na' Regala'o" by Gilberto Santa Rosa, which had been in the top spot since the issue dated December 21, 1996, and spent a total of three weeks at this position. It was succeeded by Grupo Manía's song "Linda Eh", which remained on top of the chart for four weeks. American singer Frankie Negrón released his debut album Con Amor Se Gana (1997), which was promoted by its singles "Inolvidable" (a cover version of Italian singer Laura Pausini's song) and "Hoy Me He Vuelto a Enamorar". Negrón spent 12 weeks at number one and "Inolvidable" was named the best-performing track of the year on the Tropical Airplay chart by the magazine.

Brenda K. Starr achieved her first chart-topper with a salsa cover of Myriam Hernández's ballad "Herida". Starr had previously established herself as a freestyle artist in the 1980s and returned to the music scene as a salsa artist with Te Sigo Esperando (1997) following the commercial failure of her previous album By Heart (1991). She was the only female artist to have a number one on the Tropical Airplay chart in 1997. "Dile a Ella" by Víctor Manuelle held the top spot for the longest in 1997 at nine weeks. The final number one of the year was "Y Hubo Alguien" by Marc Anthony which spent eight weeks at number one and became the first salsa song to top the Hot Latin Songs chart.

== Chart history ==
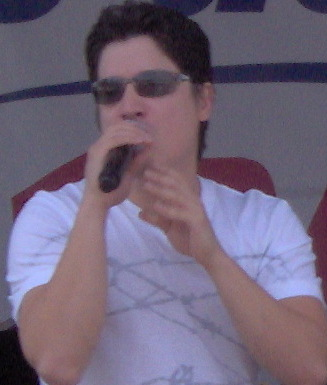
Frankie Negrón spent a total of 12 weeks at number one in 1997 with two songs.

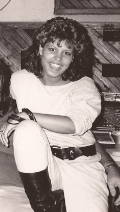
Brenda K. Starr was the only female artist to have a chart-topper in 1997.

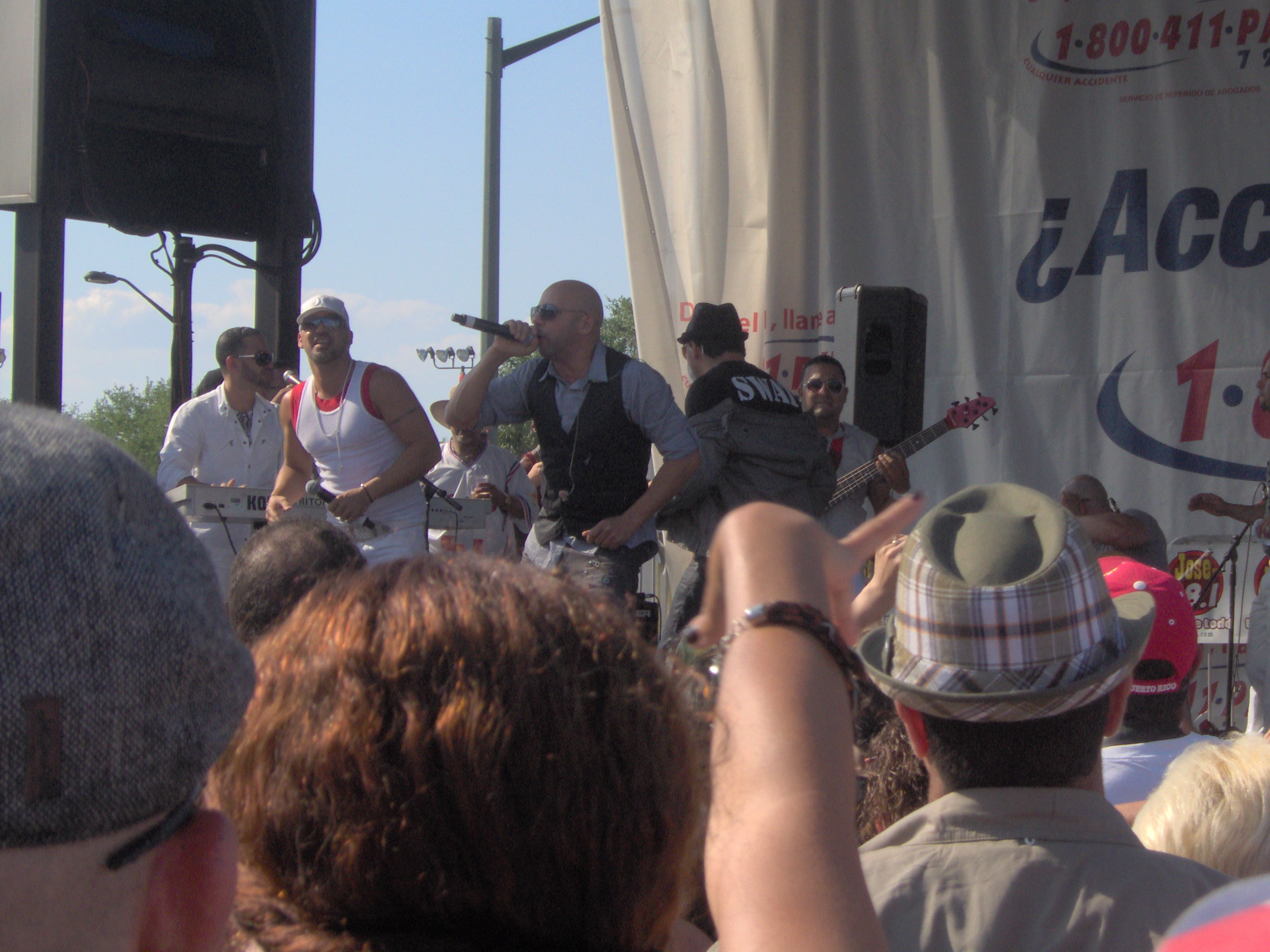
Grupo Manía achieved their first chart-topper with "Linda Eh".

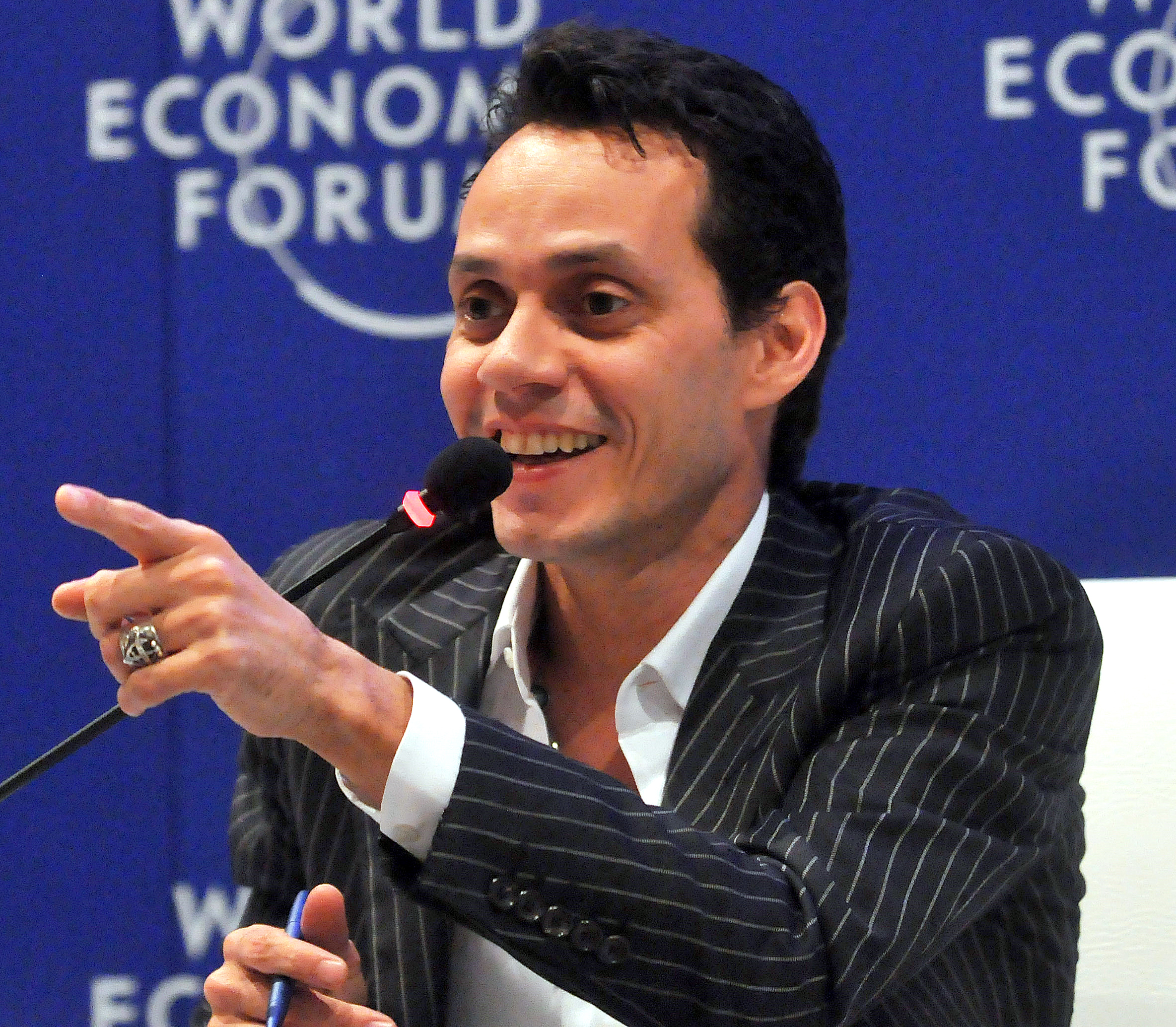
Marc Anthony had the final number one of 1997 with "Y Hubo Alguien".

Key
†	Indicates number 1 on Billboard's year-end tropical chart

Chart history
Issue date	Title	Artist(s)	Ref.
January 4	"No Quiero Na' Regala'o"	Gilberto Santa Rosa	
January 11	"Linda Eh"	Grupo Manía	
January 18	"Linda Eh"	Grupo Manía	
January 25	"Linda Eh"	Grupo Manía	
February 1	"Linda Eh"	Grupo Manía	
February 8	"Linda Eh"	Grupo Manía	
February 15	"Yo No Te Pido"	Gilberto Santa Rosa	
February 22	"Yo No Te Pido"	Gilberto Santa Rosa	
March 1	"Yo No Te Pido"	Gilberto Santa Rosa	
March 8	"Yo No Te Pido"	Gilberto Santa Rosa	
March 15	"Yo No Te Pido"	Gilberto Santa Rosa	
March 22	"Lloraré"	Jerry Rivera	
March 29	"Yo No Te Pido"	Gilberto Santa Rosa	
April 5	"Yo No Te Pido"	Gilberto Santa Rosa	
April 12	"Yo No Te Pido"	Gilberto Santa Rosa	
April 19	"Herida"	Brenda K. Starr	
April 26	"Herida"	Brenda K. Starr	
May 3	"Inolvidable" †	Frankie Negrón	
May 10	"Inolvidable" †	Frankie Negrón	
May 17	"Inolvidable" †	Frankie Negrón	
May 24	"Inolvidable" †	Frankie Negrón	
May 31	"Inolvidable" †	Frankie Negrón	
June 7	"Inolvidable" †	Frankie Negrón	
June 14	"Inolvidable" †	Frankie Negrón	
June 21	"Inolvidable" †	Frankie Negrón	
June 28	"Dile a Ella"	Víctor Manuelle	
July 5	"Dile a Ella"	Víctor Manuelle	
July 12	"Dile a Ella"	Víctor Manuelle	
July 19	"Dile a Ella"	Víctor Manuelle	
July 26	"Dile a Ella"	Víctor Manuelle	
August 2	"Dile a Ella"	Víctor Manuelle	
August 9	"Dile a Ella"	Víctor Manuelle	
August 16	"Dile a Ella"	Víctor Manuelle	
August 23	"Hoy Me He Vuelto a Enamorar"	Frankie Negrón	
August 30	"Dile a Ella"	Víctor Manuelle	
September 6	"Hoy Me He Vuelto a Enamorar"	Frankie Negrón	
September 13	"Hoy Me He Vuelto a Enamorar"	Frankie Negrón	
September 20	"Hoy Me He Vuelto a Enamorar"	Frankie Negrón	
September 27	"La Quiero a Morir"	Dark Latin Groove	
October 4	"La Quiero a Morir"	Dark Latin Groove	
October 11	"La Quiero a Morir"	Dark Latin Groove	
October 18	"La Quiero a Morir"	Dark Latin Groove	
October 25	"He Tratado"	Víctor Manuelle	
November 1	"La Quiero a Morir"	Dark Latin Groove	
November 8	"Y Hubo Alguien"	Marc Anthony	
November 15	"Y Hubo Alguien"	Marc Anthony	
November 22	"Y Hubo Alguien"	Marc Anthony	
November 29	"Y Hubo Alguien"	Marc Anthony	
December 6	"Y Hubo Alguien"	Marc Anthony	
December 13	"Y Hubo Alguien"	Marc Anthony	
December 20	"Y Hubo Alguien"	Marc Anthony	
December 27	"Y Hubo Alguien"	Marc Anthony	

== See also ==
- 1997 in Latin music
