= Premio Lo Nuestro 1998 =

Latin Music awards show

10th Lo Nuestro Awards
- Date: Thursday, May 14, 1998
- Site: James L. Knight Center; Miami, Florida, USA

Highlights
- Most awards: Alejandro Fernández (4)
- Most nominations: Alejandro Fernández (8)

The 10th Lo Nuestro Awards ceremony, presented by Univision honoring the best Latin music of 1997 and 1998 took place on May 14, 1998, at a live presentation held at the James L. Knight Center in Miami, Florida. The ceremony was broadcast in the United States and Latin America by Univision.

During the ceremony, nineteen categories were presented. Winners were announced at the live event and included Mexican singer Alejandro Fernández receiving four competitive awards. Other multiple winners were fellow Mexican singer-songwriter Juan Gabriel, Spanish singer Rocío Dúrcal and Colombian performer Charlie Zaa with two awards each. Fernández won the award for "Pop Album of the Year," Gabriel and Dúrcal earned the award for "Regional Mexican Album of the Year," and Zaa won for "Tropical/Salsa Album of the Year." A special tribute was given to Mexican singer Lucero and the Excellence Award was received by Mexican trio Los Panchos.

== Background ==
In 1989, the Lo Nuestro Awards were established by Univision, to recognize the most talented performers of Latin music. The nominees and winners were selected by a voting poll conducted among program directors of Spanish-language radio stations in the United States and the results were tabulated and certified by the accounting firm Arthur Andersen. The categories included are for the Pop, Tropical/Salsa, Regional Mexican and Music Video. The trophy awarded is shaped like a treble clef. The 10th Lo Nuestro Awards ceremony was held on May 14, 1998, in a live presentation held at the James L. Knight Center in Miami, Florida. The ceremony was broadcast in the United States and Latin America by Univision.

== Winners and nominees ==
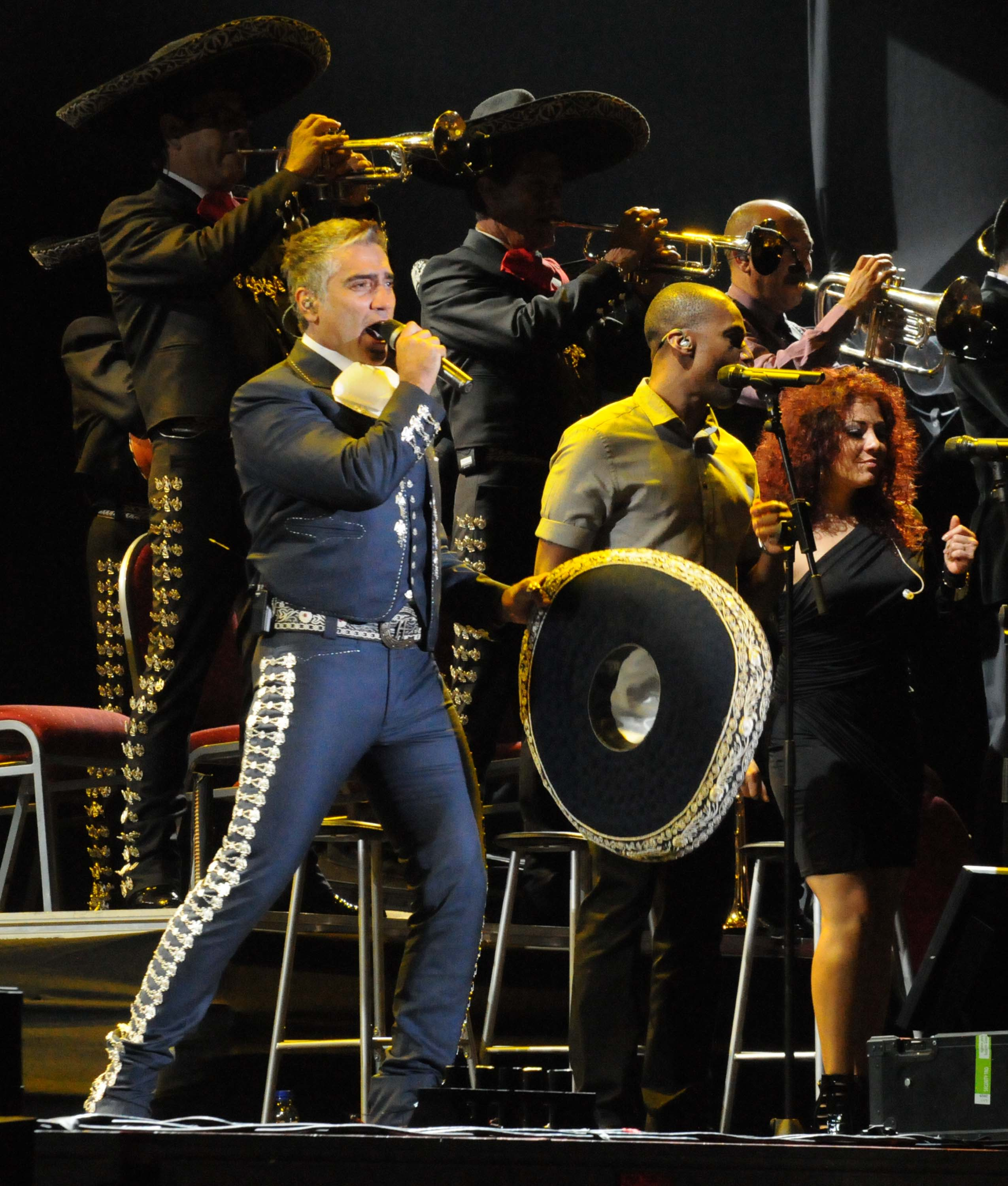
Alejandro Fernández (pictured in 2011) won four Lo Nuestro Awards in 1998, including Pop Album of the Year.

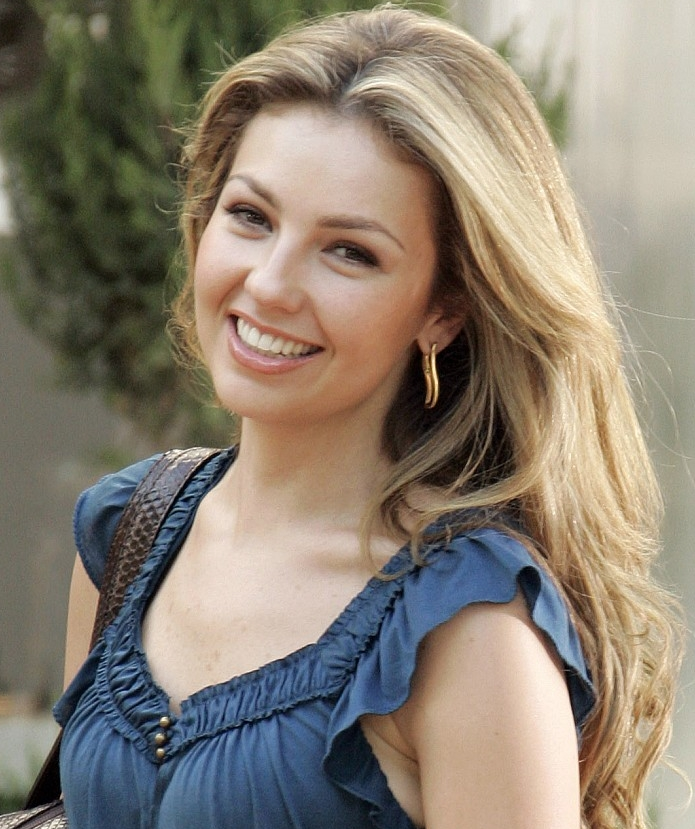
Mexican singer Thalía (pictured in 2004) was named Female Pop Singer of the Year.

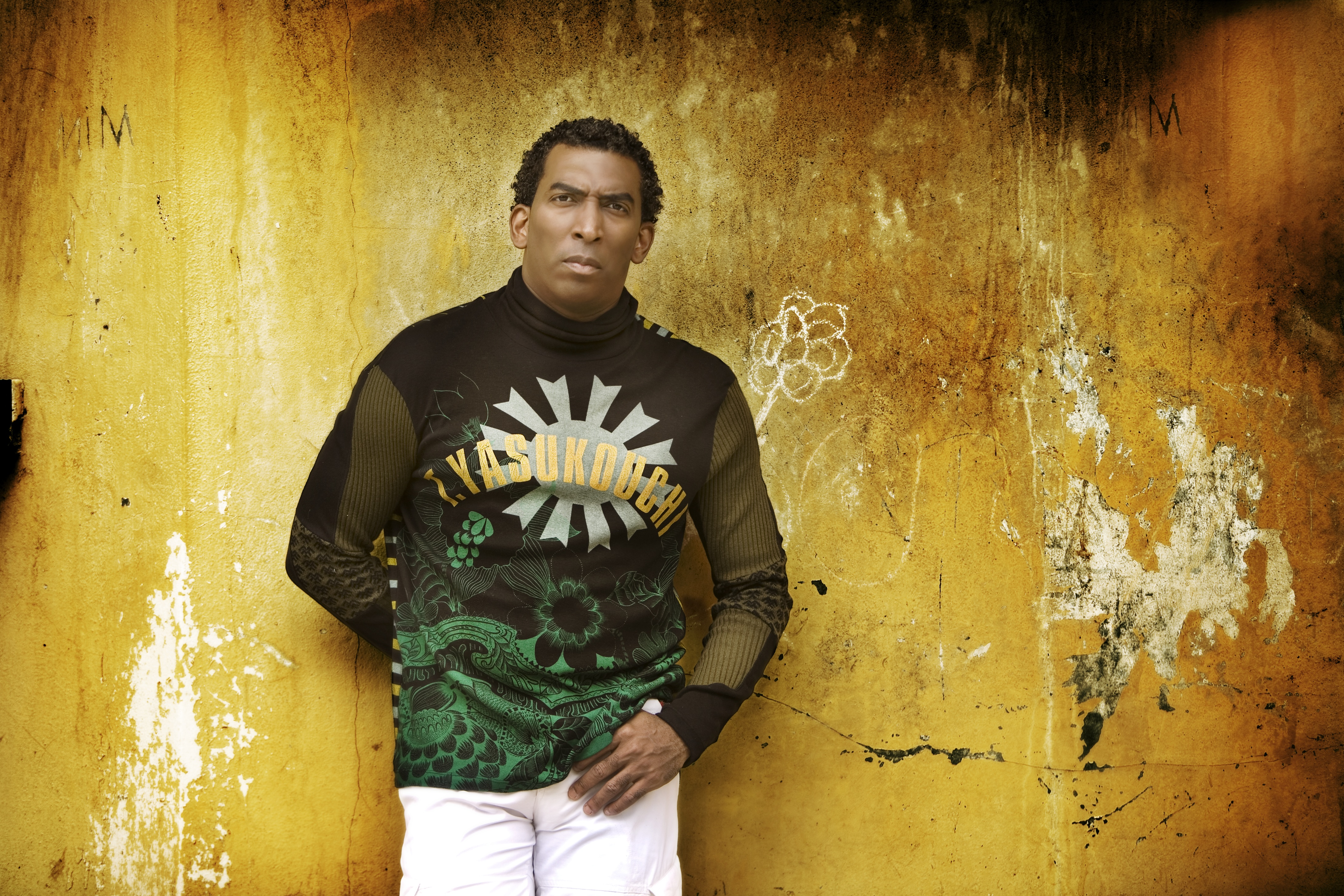
Dominican singer Chichí Peralta received the Tropical/Salsa Best New Artist award.

Winners were announced before the live audience during the ceremony. Mexican singer Alejandro Fernández was the most nominated performer, with eight nominations which resulted in four wins which included both Pop and Regional Male Artist of the Year, Pop Album and Pop Song of the Year. Mexican singer-songwriter Juan Gabriel and Spanish singer Rocío Dúrcal were awarded as Pop Group of the Year and Regional Mexican Album with Juntos Otra Vez.

All songs nominated for Pop Song of the Year reached number one at the Billboard Top Latin Songs chart: Fernández "Si Tú Supieras", Cristian's "Lo Mejor de Mí", both Gabriel's "Te Sigo Amando" and "El Destino", and Luis Miguel's "Por Debajo de la Mesa"; "La Venia Bendita" by Marco Antonio Solís was named "Regional Mexican Song of the Year" and also reached number one in the chart. Guatemalan performer Ricardo Arjona earned the accolade for Best Music Video for "Ella y Él". Colombian singer Charlie Zaa dominated the Tropical/Salsa field winning two awards, for Male Singer of the Year and Album of the Year with Sentimientos; American performer Marc Anthony earned Song of the Year for "Y Hubo Alguien", while Dominican band Ilegales won for Group of the Year.

Winners and nominees of the 10th Annual Lo Nuestro Awards (winners listed first)
Pop Album of the Year	Pop Song of the Year
Alejandro Fernández – Me Estoy Enamorando; Cristian – Lo Mejor de Mí; Ricky Martin – Vuelve; Marco Antonio Solís – Marco	Alejandro Fernández – "Si Tú Supieras" (written by Kike Santander); Cristian – "Lo Mejor de Mí" (written by Rudy Pérez); Juan Gabriel – "Te Sigo Amando" (written by Gabriel); Juan Gabriel and Rocío Dúrcal – "El Destino" (written by Gabriel); Luis Miguel – "Por Debajo de la Mesa" (written by Armando Manzanero)
Male Artist of the Year, Pop	Female Artist of the Year, Pop
Alejandro Fernández; Juan Gabriel; Luis Miguel; Enrique Iglesias	Thalía; Rocío Dúrcal; Laura Flores; Lucero
Pop Group of the Year	New Pop Artist of the Year
Juan Gabriel and Rocío Dúrcal; Alejandro Fernández and Gloria Estefan; Maná; Pandora	Jordi; Angélica; César Borja; Victoria
Regional Mexican Album of the Year	Regional Mexican Song of the Year
Juan Gabriel and Rocío Dúrcal – Juntos Otra Vez; Ana Gabriel – Con Un Mismo Corazón; Alejandro Fernández – Muy Dentro de Mi Corazón; Límite – Partiéndome el Alma; Los Tigres del Norte – Jefe de Jefes	Marco Antonio Solís – "La Venia Bendita" (written by Solís); Alejandro Fernández – "Es La Mujer" (written by Alberto Chávez); Vicente Fernández – "Nos Estorbó la Ropa" (written by Teodoro Bello); Límite – "Hasta Mañana" (written by Fernando Riba and Kiko Campos); Los Temerarios – "Ya Me Voy Para Siempre" (written by José Vaca Flores)
Male Artist of the Year, Regional Mexican	Female Artist of the Year, Regional Mexican
Alejandro Fernández; Pedro Fernández; Juan Gabriel; Marco Antonio Solís	Ana Bárbara; Ana Gabriel; Graciela Beltrán; Nydia Rojas
Regional Mexican Group of the Year	New Regional Mexican Artist of the Year
Límite	Priscila y sus Balas de Plata; Banda Limón; Conjunto Primavera; Dinastía Norteña
Tropical/Salsa Album of the Year	Tropical/Salsa Song of the Year
Charlie Zaa – Sentimientos; Marc Anthony – Contra la Corriente; La India – Sobre el Fuego; Gilberto Santa Rosa – De Corazón; Olga Tañón – Llévame Contigo	Marc Anthony – "Y Hubo Alguien" (written by Omar Alfanno and Ángel Peña); Los Hermanos Rosario – "Rompecintura" (written by Felix Veloz); La India – "Me Cansé de Ser La Otra" (written by Víctor Dan); Chichí Peralta – "Amor Narcótico" (written by Jandy Feliz); Olga Tañón – "Serpiente Mala" (written by Rodolfo Barreras)
Male Artist of the Year, Tropical/Salsa	Female Artist of the Year, Tropical/Salsa
Charlie Zaa; Marc Anthony; Frankie Negrón; Víctor Manuelle; Gilberto Santa Rosa	Olga Tañón; Albita; Jailene Cintrón; La India
Tropical/Salsa Group of the Year	New Tropical/Salsa Artist of the Year
Ilegales; Los Hermanos Rosario; Chichí Peralta and Son Familia; Proyecto Uno	Chichí Peralta and Son Familia; Los Adolescentes; Alquimia; Michael Stuart
Video of the Year
Ricardo Arjona – "Ella y Él"; Cristian – "Si Tú Me Amaras"; Alejandro Fernández – "No Sé Olvidar"; Pedro Fernández – "Si Tú Supieras"; Jordi – "Desesperadamente Enamorado"; Maná – "Hechicera"; Marc Anthony – "Y Hubo Alguien"; Carlos Vives – "Que Diera"; Alejandro Sanz – "Corazón Partío"; Thalía – "Mujer Latina"

== Special awards ==
- Lo Nuestro Excellence Award: Los Panchos
- Special Tribute: Lucero

== See also ==
- 1997 in Latin music
- 1998 in Latin music
- Grammy Award for Best Latin Pop Album
- Grammy Award for Best Mexican/Mexican-American Album
- Grammy Award for Best Traditional Tropical Latin Album
