= No Me Compares =

No Me Compares (Latin, Spanish for Do Not Compare Me) may refer to:

- No Me Compares (album), an album by Frankie Negrón
- "No Me Compares" (song), a song by Alejandro Sanz
