= List of Billboard Regional Mexican Albums number ones of 1997 =

The Regional Mexican Albums, published in Billboard magazine, is a record chart that features Latin music sales information for regional styles of Mexican music. This data are compiled by Nielsen SoundScan from a sample that includes music stores, music departments at department stores and verifiable sales from concert venues in the United States.

== Albums ==
Issue Date	Album	Artist	Reference
January 4	Siempre Selena	Selena	
January 11	Siempre Selena	Selena	
January 18	Siempre Selena	Selena	
January 25	Siempre Selena	Selena	
February 1	Siempre Selena	Selena	
February 8	Siempre Selena	Selena	
February 15	Siempre Selena	Selena	
February 22	Partiendome El Alma	Limite	
March 1	Partiendome El Alma	Limite	
March 8	Partiendome El Alma	Limite	
March 15	Partiendome El Alma	Limite	
March 22	Partiendome El Alma	Limite	
March 29	Siempre Selena †	Selena	
April 5	Siempre Selena †	Selena	
April 12	Siempre Selena †	Selena	
April 19	Siempre Selena †	Selena	
April 26	Siempre Selena †	Selena	
May 3	Siempre Selena †	Selena	
May 10	Partiendome El Alma †	Limite	
May 17	Tucanes De Oro	Los Tucanes de Tijuana	
May 24	Tucanes De Oro	Los Tucanes de Tijuana	
May 31	Juntos Otra Vez	Juan Gabriel and Rocío Dúrcal	
June 7	Juntos Otra Vez	Juan Gabriel and Rocío Dúrcal	
June 14	Juntos Otra Vez	Juan Gabriel and Rocío Dúrcal	
June 21	Juntos Otra Vez	Juan Gabriel and Rocío Dúrcal	
June 28	Juntos Otra Vez	Juan Gabriel and Rocío Dúrcal	
July 5	Jefe de Jefes	Los Tigres del Norte	
July 12	Jefe de Jefes	Los Tigres del Norte	
July 19	Jefe de Jefes	Los Tigres del Norte	
July 26	Jefe de Jefes	Los Tigres del Norte	
August 2	Jefe de Jefes	Los Tigres del Norte	
August 9	Jefe de Jefes	Los Tigres del Norte	
August 16	Jefe de Jefes	Los Tigres del Norte	
August 23	Jefe de Jefes	Los Tigres del Norte	
August 30	Jefe de Jefes	Los Tigres del Norte	
September 6	Jefe de Jefes	Los Tigres del Norte	
September 13	Jefe de Jefes	Los Tigres del Norte	
September 20	Jefe de Jefes	Los Tigres del Norte	
September 27	Jefe de Jefes	Los Tigres del Norte	
October 4	Jefe de Jefes	Los Tigres del Norte	
October 11	Jefe de Jefes	Los Tigres del Norte	
October 18	Jefe de Jefes	Los Tigres del Norte	
October 25	Jefe de Jefes	Los Tigres del Norte	
November 1	Jefe de Jefes	Los Tigres del Norte	
November 8	Sentimientos	Limite	
November 15	Sentimientos	Limite	
November 22	Sentimientos	Limite	
November 29	Sentimientos	Limite	
December 6	Sentimientos	Limite	
December 13	Sentimientos	Limite	
December 20	Sentimientos	Limite	
December 27	Con un mismo corazón	Ana Gabriel	
