= Agua Pasada =

1998 song by Frankie Negrón

"Agua Passada"

Single by Frankie Negrón

from the album No Me Compares
- Released: 1998
- Studio: Sir Sound Recording, NY, NY
- Genre: Salsa
- Length: 4:58
- Label: WEA Latina
- Songwriter: Gil Francisco
- Producer: Sergio George

Frankie Negrón singles chronology
"Una Gota de Lluvia" (1997)	"Agua Passada" (1998)	"Princesa" (1999)

"Agua Pasada" ("Expired Water") is a song written by Gil Francisco and performed by American salsa singer Frankie Negrón on his second studio album No Me Compares (1998). It was released as the lead single from the album. It became his third number one on the Tropical Airplay chart. On the review of the album, the Newsday critic Richard cited "Agua Pasada" and the title track where George and Negrón "deliver the salsa goods". John Lannert of Billboard called it a "sizzling leadoff single". "Agua Pasada" was nominated in the category of Tropical Song of the Year at the 11th Annual Lo Nuestro Awards, but lost to "Suavemente" by Elvis Crespo. It was acknowledged as an award-winning song at the 2000 BMI Latin Awards.

== Charts ==
Chart (1998)	Peak position
US Hot Latin Songs (Billboard)	3
US Tropical Airplay (Billboard)	1

== See also ==
- List of Billboard Tropical Airplay number ones of 1998
