= Hoy Me He Vuelto a Enamorar =

1997 song by Frankie Negrón

"Hoy Me Vuelto a Enamorar"

Single by Frankie Negrón

from the album Con Amor Se Gana
- Released: 1997
- Studio: Sir Sound, Inc., NY; Skylight, Belleville, NJ; Ultrasonic Studios W.N.Y., N.J
- Genre: Salsa
- Length: 5:05
- Label: Warner Music Latina
- Songwriter: Jorge Luis Piloto
- Producers: Rene Leyva; Sergio George

Frankie Negrón singles chronology
"Inolvidable" (1997)	"Hoy Me Vuelto a Enamorar" (1997)	"Una Gota de Lluvia" (1997)

"Hoy Me He Vuelto a Enamorar" ("I Have Fallen in Love Again") is a song written by Jorge Luis Piloto and performed by American salsa singer Frankie Negrón on his debut studio album Con Amor Se Gana (1997). It was released as the second single from the album. Piloto specifically wrote the song for Negrón. In the song, the singer gets over his former lover by finding a new love interest. It became his second #1 hit on the Tropical Airplay chart. On the review of the album, the Newsday critic Richard Torres praised Negrón for being able to "convey the drama" on the track. Similarly, Alisa Valdes of the Boston Globe noted that the artist "seizes upon traditional montuno sounds to relax his reserve, and belts out some nice licks." The track was recognized as one of the best-performing songs of the year on the Tropical/salsa field at the 1998 ASCAP Latin Awards.

== Charts ==
=== Weekly charts ===
Chart (1997)	Peak position
US Hot Latin Songs (Billboard)	5
US Tropical Airplay (Billboard)	1

=== Year-end charts ===
Chart (1997)	Position
US Tropical Airplay (Billboard)	3

== See also ==
- List of Billboard Tropical Airplay number ones of 1997
