= El Destino =

El Destino may refer to:

- El Destino Plantation, an American cotton plantation established in 1828
- "El Destino" (song), by Juan Gabriel and Rocío Dúrcal, 1997

== See also ==
- El destino se disculpa, a 1945 Spanish drama film
