= No Quiero Na' Regala'o =

1996 single by Gilberto Santa Rosa

Single by Gilberto Santa Rosa

from the album Esencia
- Released: 1996
- Genre: Salsa
- Length: 4:42
- Label: Sony Discos
- Songwriter: Perín Vasquez
- Producers: José Lugo; Gilberto Santa Rosa

Gilberto Santa Rosa singles chronology
| "Díme Porqué" (1995) | "No Quiero Na' Regala'o" (1996) | "Yo No Te Pido" (1997) |

"No Quiero Na' Regala'o" (I Don't Want a Gift) is a song by Puerto Rican salsa band El Gran Combo de Puerto Rico from their studio album De Punta a Punta (1971). Written by Perín Vasquez, it deals with the singer not wanting love merely out of pity.

The song was covered by Puerto Rican singer Gilberto Santa Rosa on his tenth studio album Esencia (1996). Production of Santa Rosa's version was co-handled by the artist and José Lugo. The cover version was positively reviewed by critics, who called it catchy and danceable. In the United States, "No Quiero Na' Regala'o" reached number 10 on the Billboard Hot Latin Songs chart and topped the Tropical Airplay chart, spending three weeks in the position.

== Background and composition ==
"No Quiero Na' Regala'o" was written by Perín Vasquez and originally performed by Puerto Rican salsa band El Gran Combo de Puerto Rico on their studio album De Punta a Punta (1971). A salsa song, it is a "ego-driven theme about not wanting pity when seeking true love".

In 1996, Gilberto Santa Rosa, an avid fan of the band, covered the song on his tenth studio album, Esencia. It was his first studio album to not feature his backup band since he became a solo artist ten years prior. Santa Rosa stated that he did no longer wanted to maintain an administrative role and felt like a true musician after relinquishing his position as a bandleader. The song was produced by Santa Rosa, along with José Lugo.

== Promotion and reception ==
"No Quiero Na' Regala'o" was released as the lead single from Esencia in 1996. Critic Ramiro Burr wrote for the Fort Worth Star-Telegram that despite the sadness of the lyrics, he felt the "bright cracking horns produce a wildly festive mood" and regarded it as "instantly danceable". La Prensa de San Antonio editor Diana Raquel called it a "very catchy and danceable rhythm" song and said that it brought to mind Santa Rosa's time as a member of Willie Rosario's band. Eliseo Cardona of Miami-based El Nuevo Herald described it as the song in which Santa Rosa has "full command of his resources" on the album with its "delicious pregónes".

In the United States, "No Quiero Na' Regala'o" reached number 10 on the Billboard Hot Latin Songs chart and topped the Tropical Airplay chart, spending three weeks in the spot. On the year-end charts, it ended 1997 ranked number 13 on the Tropical Airplay chart.

== Charts ==
=== Weekly charts ===
Chart performance for "No Quiero Na' Regala'o"
| Chart (1996–97) | Peak position |
|---|---|
| US Hot Latin Songs (Billboard) | 10 |
| US Tropical Airplay (Billboard) | 1 |

=== Year-end charts ===
1997 year-end chart performance for "No Quiero Na' Regala'o"
| Chart (1997) | Position |
|---|---|
| US Tropical Airplay (Billboard) | 13 |

== See also ==
- List of Billboard Tropical Airplay number ones of 1996
- List of Billboard Tropical Airplay number ones of 1997
