= Dile a Ella =

1997 song by Victor Manuelle

Single by Víctor Manuelle

from the album A Pesar de Todo
- Released: 1997
- Studio: Powerlight, Puerto Rico; Sir Sound, Inc., New York, NY
- Genre: Salsa
- Length: 5:05
- Label: Sony Discos
- Songwriter: Gil Francisco
- Producers: Charlie Dos Santos; Sergio George

Víctor Manuelle singles chronology
"Como una Estrella" (1997)	"Dile a Ella" (1997)	"He Tratado" (1997)

"Dile a Ella" ("Tell Her") is a song written by Gil Francisco and performed by Puerto Rican salsa singer Víctor Manuelle on his fourth studio album A Pesar de Todo (1997). It was released as the lead single from the album. In the song, the singer asks his friend to tell a woman that he loved that he cannot forget her. It became his third #1 hit on the Tropical Airplay chart and spent nine weeks on top, making it the longest-running tropical song of 1997. José A. Estévez, Jr. called it a tune that "bristles with uninhibited energy". Paul Verna of Billboard cited the song as one of the album's "amorous ditties". "Dile a Ella" was also listed on Billboard's "Best 15 Salsa Songs Ever". "Dile a Ella" won a BMI Latin Award in 1999.

== Charts ==
=== Weekly charts ===
Chart (1997)	Peak position
US Hot Latin Songs (Billboard)	9
US Tropical Airplay (Billboard)	1

=== Year-end charts ===
Chart (1997)	Position
US Tropical Airplay (Billboard)	2

== See also ==
- List of Billboard Tropical Airplay number ones of 1997
