= Contra la Corriente (Marc Anthony album) =

1997 studio album by Marc Anthony

Studio album by Marc Anthony
- Released: October 21, 1997
- Recorded: 1997
- Studio: Altamar Music Studio (San Juan, Puerto Rico)
- Genres: Tropical; salsa; Latin pop
- Length: 44:39
- Language: Spanish
- Label: RMM
- Producers: Marc Anthony; Angel "Cucco" Peña

Marc Anthony chronology
Todo a Su Tiempo (1995)	Contra la Corriente (1997)	Marc Anthony (1999)

Singles from Contra la Corriente
- 1. "Y Hubo Alguien" Released: October 1997; 2. "Me Voy a Regalar" Released: December 1997; 3. "Si Te Vas" Released: January 1998; 4. "No Me Conoces" Released: May 1998; 5. "Contra la Corriente" Released: August 1998; 6. "No Sabes Como Duele" Released: March 1999

Contra la Corriente (Against the Current) is the third studio album released by American singer Marc Anthony on October 21, 1997, by RMM Records. The album was produced by Puerto Rican musician Angel "Cucco" Peña, with most of the songs written by Panamanian composer Omar Alfanno. The album was well received by critics who praised the vocals of Anthony as well as the songs. The album produced six singles, four of which peaked on the top ten on the Hot Latin Tracks chart. Promoted by a sold-out concert in Madison Square Garden, Contra la Corriente became the first salsa album to reach number one on the Top Latin Albums chart and to chart on the Billboard 200.

Contra la Corriente received a Grammy Award and a Latin Billboard Award, and was named the eighth best album of 1997 by Time magazine. It has sold over 400,000 copies as of 2000. The album received a gold certification for shipping of 500,000 copies in the United States. This was the last album that Marc Anthony recorded under RMM Records before switching over to Columbia Records to record his first self-titled English album.

== Background ==
Since Anthony's signing on with RMM, his first-two albums—Otra Nota and Todo a Su Tiempo—had been successful, selling over 600,000 copies combined by 1996. His latter album, Todo a Su Tiempo, was certified gold in the United States and received a Grammy Award nomination. Sergio George, who produced Anthony's previous albums, was not involved in the production of Contra la Corriente as he had left RMM to establish his own record label. Angel "Cucco" Peña, who has worked with salsa veterans such as Gilberto Santa Rosa and Willie Colón, took up the position as producer for the album. Contra la Corriente, the third studio album by Anthony, was released in October 1997. The album was distributed by MCA Records and was promoted at a sold-out concert in Madison Square Garden days before the release of the album.

== Recording and production ==
For the album, Anthony built a studio near his home. Around that time, he was involved in the production of Paul Simon's musical play The Capeman and had to record the album in three weeks. Anthony chose nine songs out of 1,300 samples. He sent tapes to co-producer Peña at the Altamar Music Studios in San Juan, Puerto Rico, to get feedback. He made routine flights between New York and Puerto Rico to record the album hours and to rehearse for the play. Panamanian composer Omar Alfanno, who wrote three songs on the last album, had composed five songs for the album. Fernando Arias composed the boleros "No Me Conoces" and "Suceden". "Si Te Vas" is a cover of the Pedro Fernández song. Manny Benito wrote the last track, "Un Mal Sueño".

== Singles ==
Marc Anthony "Y Hubo Alguien" (1997)
A sample of the lead single, "Y Hubo Alguien".

"Y Hubo Alguien" (And There Was Somebody) was the lead single from the album. Released in the same month as the album, the single reached number-one on the Hot Latin Tracks. It was his first number one single on the chart and the first single by a salsa musician to reach number one. "Me Voy a Regalar" (I Am Going to Give) followed later in the year. "Si Te Vas" (If You Go) was the third single from the album, released in 1998; it reached number-eight on Hot Latin Tracks. "Contra la Corriente" (Against the Current) and "No Me Conoces" (You Do Not Know Me) both reached number-two on Hot Latin Tracks., "No Sabes Como Duele" (You Do Not Know How It Hurts) was the last single to be released from the album in 1999 and reached number-eighteen on the Hot Latin Tracks. Three of the six singles, "Y Hubo Alguien", "Si Te Vas", and "Contra la Corriente", reached number-one on the Latin Tropical Airplay charts. Two songs from the album were made into music videos. The first music video was the lead single "Y Hubo Alguien" which was filmed in New York City. The second music video was "No Me Conoces" which was directed by Benny Corral. Filming took place in Mexico and featured Anthony's future wife Jennifer Lopez as the supporting actress.

== Reception and legacy ==
Professional ratings
Review scores
Source	Rating
Allmusic	4.5/5 stars
Chicago Tribune	3.5/4 stars
Los Angeles Times	2/4 stars
The Philadelphia Inquirer	3.5/4 stars

Contra la Corriente received mostly positive reviews from critics, who praised Marc Anthony's singing. Terry Jenkins of Allmusic gave the album a 4.5 out of 5 and praised Anthony's vocals as being "sexy" and "near-flawless" though he felt that it "doesn't quite match the dizzying heights of his breakthrough Todo a Su Tiempo". Achy Obejas of the Chicago Tribune names Contra la Corriente as Anthony's best album and felt that the influence of Cuban music was prominent "in the rhythms and harmonies" in comparison to Los Van Van. The Philadelphia Inquirer critic Tom Moon rated Contra la Corriente 3.5 out of 4 stars noting the R&B-influence sound on the salsa tracks and felt some of the tunes were "gratuitously showy". However Moon complimented Anthony's ability to ad-lib ""in a loose, refreshingly offhand way".

The Knight Ridder Fernando Gonzalez gave the disc a B− rating felt it was "adequate rather than inspiring" as he found the arrangements had "few surprises". Ernesto Lechner of the Los Angeles Times, who was more critical of the album, gave it two-out-of-four stars criticizing the arrangements as "unbearably soapy" and called the album a "flawed masterpiece in the saccharine genre of salsa romantica." An editor for Billboard magazine felt the record would let Anthony "build on his towering reputation with another radio-appropriate package". Contra la Corriente was named the eighth best album of 1997 by Time magazine stating that "...whether you habla espanol or not, Anthony's talent comes through, no translation needed".

At the 41st Grammy Awards, Contra la Corriente was given a Grammy Award for Best Tropical Latin Performance. Lechner later said the album was "poppish" and claimed it to "not measure up against most of the competing efforts in his category." Billboard awarded the album "Tropical Album of the Year by a Male Artist", citing that the album became the highest selling salsa album when it charted the Billboard 200. It also received a nomination for a 10th Lo Nuestro Awards for "Tropical Album of the Year". The single "Y Hubo Alguien" received a Billboard Latin Music Award and a Lo Nuestro award for "Tropical Song of the Year".

This would be the last time that Anthony worked with the RMM label. After disputes with Ralph Mercado over business practices, he left the record label and later signed on with Columbia Records to record his first self titled English album.

== Commercial performance ==
During the Madison Square Garden concert, RMM executive producer Ralph Mercado presented an award to Anthony for selling over 350,000 copies just before release. Contra la Corriente was the released on October 21, 1997, in the United States. The album debuted at number-one on the Top Latin Albums chart on the week of November 22, 1997, and stayed at number-one for three consecutive weeks. The album debuted at number-one on the Tropical Albums chart and remained on top for ten non-consecutive weeks. Contra la Corriente was the first album Anthony to chart on the Billboard 200, peaking at number seventy-four. The album was the fourth best selling Latin album of 1998 and was the second best selling tropical album after Buena Vista Social Club. The album was certified gold in the United States for shipping of 500,000 units. A remastered edition of the album was released on September 9, 2003, by Universal Music Latino. Contra la Corriente has sold over 400,000 units as of 2000.

== Track listing ==
No.	Title	Writer(s)	Length
1.	"Y Hubo Alguien"	Omar Alfanno	6:23
2.	"Contra la Corriente"	Alfanno	5:13
3.	"Si Te Vas"	Pedro Fernández	4:43
4.	"Me Voy a Regalar"	Alfanno	5:33
5.	"No Me Conoces"	Fernando Arias	5:30
6.	"No Sabes Cómo Duele"	Alfanno	5:07
7.	"La Luna Sobre Nuestro Amor"	Alfanno	4:58
8.	"Suceden"	Arias	4:00
9.	"Un Mal Sueño"	Manny Benito	3:23

== Personnel ==
The following credits are from Allmusic.

=== Performers ===
- Tito Allen – vocals, coro
- William Amparo – vocals, coro
- Luis Aquino – trumpet
- Wichy Camacho – vocals, coro
- Jose Gazmei – bass
- Gilda Gonzalez – vocals, coro
- Angel "Angie" Machado – trumpet
- Fernando Muscolo – arranger, keyboards, programming
- Moisés Nogueras – trombone
- Miguel Rivera – trombone
- Antonio Gomez Salcedo – string contractor
- Ito Serrano – guitar
- Charlie Sierra – percussion, bongos, timbales
- William Thompson – conga
- Maximo Torres – guitar, requinto
- Raffi Torres – trombone
- Yanira Torres – vocals, coro

=== Technical ===
- Ricky Gonzalez – arranger
- Luis Berrios – engineer, assistant engineer, recording
- Joe Caldas – engineer, mixing, recording
- Juan G. "Pericles" Covas – engineer, recording
- Pericles Covas – engineer, assistant engineer
- Daniel Hastings – photography
- Marta Ibarra – editing, editorial coordinator, publishing coordinator
- Amaury Lopez – arranger
- José Lugo – arranger
- Damaris Mercado – producer, art direction, artistic director
- Ralph Mercado – executive producer
- Carlo Moralishvili – producer, artwork, art direction
- Angel "Cucco" Peña – arranger, director, producer, musical director, musical direction, general director
- Humberto Ramírez – arranger
- Héctor Ivan Rosa – engineer, recording
- Ronnie Torres – mixing engineer
- Liliane Van Balberghe – graphic design

== Charts ==
=== Weekly charts ===
Chart (1997)	Peak position
U.S. Billboard 200	74
U.S. Billboard Top Latin Albums	1
U.S. Billboard Tropical Albums	1

=== Year-end charts ===
Chart (1997)	Peak position
U.S. Billboard Tropical Albums	9
Chart (1998)	Peak position
U.S. Billboard Top Latin Albums	4

=== Certifications ===
Region	Certification	Certified units/sales
United States (RIAA)	Gold	500,000^{^}
^{^} Shipments figures based on certification alone.

== See also ==
- 1997 in Latin music
- Music of Puerto Rico
- List of number-one Billboard Top Latin Albums from the 1990s
