= Jaqueline Negron =

- Born: September 27, 1989 (age 35); Newark, New Jersey
- Origin: United States
- Occupation: Singer
- Years active: 1994–present
- Labels: MDA Studios

Jaqueline Negrón (born September 27, 1989 in Newark, New Jersey to parents, Francisco Negrón Santos and Zaida González) is an up-and-coming singer of Puerto Rican descent. Her styles include blends of pop, R&B, hip-hop, and reggaetón. Siblings include David Negrón, and salsa superstar, Frankie Negrón. She is currently registered as a composer/performer at ASCAP.

Jaqueline began her career very early, when at the age of four, she won a place in New Jersey's 1994 Puerto Rican Statewide Parade. Once her family relocated to Miami, Florida, she immediately joined with MDA Studios and has been working non-stop since then. She makes regular appearances on the most popular internationally viewed show in the United States and Latin America, Univision Network's Sabado Gigante, as well as appearances throughout US cities and international venues in the Dominican Republic and her parents' homeland of Puerto Rico.

In 2001, Jaqueline Negrón was honored with the Platinum Award for her vocal ability in the nationally recognized Star Power competition. Her performance at Miami's American Airlines Arena in "El Concierto del Amor" that same summer solidified her reputation as a star on the rise in the music industry.

Works done include background vocals for many international recording artists at the Kike Santander Studios in Miami. She has also had the opportunity to showcase her multiple talents with singing, dancing, and acting before live audiences as part of the musical "Broadway: A Kid's Review", presented by the famous TropiGala in Miami and the Apollo Showtime Kids. Having been named a finalist on "Showtime in Harlem" Kids Finals, Jaqueline won an all-expenses paid trip to New York City in January 2003 to perform live. Later on that same year, in July 2003, she was also invited to perform on a “Young Stars of Miami Tour” in Buenos Aires, Argentina, sponsored and coordinated by Argentina’s Teatro Premier. In March 2004, Coca-Cola sponsored Jaqueline to perform at the largest Latin American music festival in the world: Miami, Florida's Calle Ocho Festival. Her highest recognition happened recently when she was invited to the Estefan Studios by Emilio Estefan himself, to help record "El Ultimo Adios", a song written in memory of those lost in the September 11 terrorist attacks. She also was fortunate enough to appear in Sabado Gigante's "Estrellas del Futuro".
