= Yo No Te Pido =

1997 single by Gilberto Santa Rosa

Single by Gilberto Santa Rosa

from the album Esencia
- Released: 1997
- Genre: Salsa
- Length: 4:42
- Label: Sony Discos
- Songwriter: Perín Vasquez
- Producers: José Lugo; Gilberto Santa Rosa

Gilberto Santa Rosa singles chronology
"Díme Porqué" (1995)	"Yo No Te Pido" (1997)	"Esas Lagrimas (Perdona)" (1997)

"Yo No Te Pido" ("I Do Not Ask of You") is a song written by Jorge Luís Piloto and performed by Puerto Rican salsa singer Gilberto Santa Rosa from his tenth studio album Esencia (1996). It was released as the second single from the album. In the song, the singer tells a woman he does not ask for too much and they can do it as friends. It became his second #1 hit on the Tropical Airplay chart. The track was recognized as one of the best-performing songs of the year on the Tropical/salsa field at the 1998 ASCAP Latin Awards.

== Charts ==
=== Weekly charts ===
Chart (1997)	Peak position
US Hot Latin Songs (Billboard)	14
US Tropical Airplay (Billboard)	1

=== Year-end charts ===
Chart (1997)	Position
US Tropical Airplay (Billboard)	5

== See also ==
- List of Billboard Tropical Airplay number ones of 1997
