= ...En la Plaza de Toros México =

Live album by Ana Gabriel
- Released: September 1, 1998 (Mexico)
- Recorded: 1998
- Genre: Rancheras; Regional; Pop; Concert
- Length: 125:39
- Label: Sony Internacional
- Director: Ana Gabriel; Ernesto Abrego

Ana Gabriel chronology
Con un mismo corazón (1997)	...En la Plaza de Toros México (1998)	Soy como soy (1999)

En la Plaza de Toros México (English In Mexico's Plaza de Toros) is the 14th album by Mexican pop singer, Ana Gabriel, and her second live. It was released on 1998. This is a compilation of self-penned previous rancheras and pop material. Gabriel also pays tribute to the quintessential ranchera composer José Alfredo Jiménez and Juan Gabriel. This new release was presented in a package of two cds and it was edited again in 2007 with a DVD format.

== Track listing ==
- CD and DVD has the same order in the tracks.

Disc One
No.	Title	Length
1.	"Danza De Ángeles"	1:30
2.	"Pecado Original"	3:31
3.	"Esta Noche"	3:23
4.	"No Te Hago Falta"	4:43
5.	"Destino"	4:01
6.	"Solo Fantasía"	5:31
7.	"Evidencias"	4:16
8.	"Hasta Que Te Conocí"	2:58
9.	"Popurrí Pop: Soledad/Ni Un Roce/Mar Y Arena/Ay Amor"	8:43
10.	"Rayando El Sol"	3:29
11.	"Clemencia"	3:17
12.	"Viejo Amor"	3:19
13.	"Valentín De La Sierra"	3:24
14.	"Mi Talismán/Vámonos"	5:42
15.	"Paz En Este Amor"	3:36
16.	"Me Equivoqué Contigo"	3:05

Disc Two
No.	Title	Length
1.	"Con Un Mismo Corazón"	3:46
2.	"Popurrí Ranchero: Ahora/No Entiendo/Sin Problemas/Es Demasiado"	8:28
3.	"A Pesar De Todos"	3:51
4.	"Mexico Lindo y Querido / Cielito Lindo"	5:54
5.	"Mi Gusto Es"	2:50
6.	"En La Oscuridad"	3:25
7.	"Cosas Del Amor"	3:55
8.	"No Sabes"	3:26
9.	"Es El Amor Quien Llega/Amor"	4:56
10.	"Quién Como Tú"	3:33
11.	"Simplemente Amigos"	4:10
12.	"Y Aquí Estoy"	2:59
13.	"Luna"	4:34
14.	"Hice Bien Quererte" (Lambada Version)	5:54

== Album charts ==
=== 1998 charts ===
#	Chart	United States Peak Position
1.	"Lat. Pop Alb."	13
2.	"Top Lat. Albums"	37

=== 2007 charts ===
#	Chart	United States Peak Position
1.	"Lat. Pop Alb."	9
2.	"Top Lat. Albums"	25

== Certifications ==
Region	Certification	Certified units/sales
Mexico (AMPROFON)	2× Gold	200,000^{‡}
United States (RIAA)	2× Platinum (Latin)	200,000^{^}
^{^} Shipments figures based on certification alone.^{‡} Sales+streaming figures based on certification alone.
