= Y Hubo Alguien =

1997 promotional single by Marc Anthony

Promotional single by Marc Anthony

from the album Contra la Corriente
- Released: 1997
- Studio: Altamar Music Studios, San Juan, Puerto Rico; Unique Recording Studio, New York City
- Genre: Salsa
- Length: 6:30 (album version); 4:12 (radio edit)
- Label: RMM
- Songwriter: Omar Alfanno
- Producer: Angel "Cuco" Peña

Marc Anthony singles chronology
"Vieja Mesa" (1997)	"Y Hubo Alguien" (1997)	"Me Voy a Regalar" (1997)

"Y Hubo Alguien" (English: "And There Was Someone") is a song by American singer Marc Anthony from his third studio album, Contra la Corriente (1997). The song was written by Omar Alfanno, with record production being handled by Ángel "Cucco" Peña. It was released as the first promotional single from the album in 1997. A salsa song which combines elements of R&B, it describes a man who has found love again after his former lover left him. The song was inspired by a fight Alfanno had with his partner and pitched the song to RMM, but was turned down. Anthony offered to record the track after Alfanno presented it to him.

"Y Hubo Alguien" won the Billboard Latin Music Award for "Tropical/Salsa Hot Latin Track of the Year" in 1998 and the Lo Nuestro Award for Tropical Song of the Year in the same year. Its music video was directed by Benny Corral and was nominated in the category of Video of the Year at the 1998 Lo Nuestro Awards. Commercially, it topped the Billboard Hot Latin Songs in the United States, becoming the first salsa track accomplish this achievement. It also reached the top of the Tropical Airplay chart where it spent eight weeks at this position. The song was covered by Puerto Rican singer Ángel López as a ballad on his studio album Historias de Amor (2010).

== Background and composition ==
By 1996, Anthony's albums, Otra Nota and Todo a Su Tiempo (released by RMM) had sold over 600,000 copies combined. Sergio George, who produced both albums, had established his own record label and was working with his own artists. As George was unable to produce Anthony's next record, Anthony got together with Puerto Rican musician Angel "Cucco" Peña, having previously worked with other artists such as Gilberto Santa Rosa and Willie Colón, to produce his third studio album Contra la Corriente (1997). Omar Alfanno, who composed three tracks on the last album, wrote five tracks for Contra la Corriente including "Y Hubo Alguien".

Alfanno was commissioned by Ralph Mercado, the executive producer of RMM, to write a song for an artist under his label and proposed "Y Hubo Alguien, which was inspired by a fight he had with his partner. Alfanno composed the song with the intention of it being performed by a female singer. However, it was denied by the label because Alfanno himself was not a woman. Disappointed with the rejection, he arrived at Anthony's apartment to showcase the artist the track that his label dismissed. After listening to the demo, Anthony recalled "I cried. I knew that would be the first song for the album" and promised Alfanno he would record it the following day. A salsa song combined with R&B elements, it describes an anguished man in solitude who was abandoned by his former lover and is "conquered" by another woman. Later, his ex-lover returns only to learn he has found love with a new woman.

== Promotion and reception ==
"Y Hubo Alguien" was released as the first promotional single from the album in 1997. A truncated version of the song was added to Anthony's greatest hits album Desde un Principio: From the Beginning (1999), while the original recording was included on the compilation album Éxitos Eternos (2003). Anthony delivered a performance the song in prior to the album's release at the Madison Square Garden in New York City. Three years later, he performed the song live at the same venue which was later released on his live video album The Concert from Madison Square Garden (2001). A music video for the song was filmed and directed by Benny Corral; it was nominated in the category of Video of the Year at the 1998 Lo Nuestro Awards, but lost to "Ella y Él" by Ricardo Arjona. In 2010, Puerto Rican singer Ángel López covered the song as a ballad on his studio album Historias de Amor, a collection of songs Alfanno had previously composed. The song, along with the rest of the album, was arranged and produced by Alfanno.

On the review of Contra la Corriente, the Newsday editor Richard Torres commented: "Few vocalists can go from a whisper to a scream as beautifully as Anthony. He always makes apparent the heartbreak in his voice even when singing in unison with a blaring background trumpet" and praised the trumpet arrangement by Peña. A writer for the New York Daily News noted that the song "reflects the fusion of R&B and Latin rhythms so characteristic of his music". "Y Hubo Alguien" placed seventh AOL Radio's 10 Best Salsa Songs list, while La Prensa listed it as one of Marc Anthony's best 15 songs. At the 1998 Latin Billboard Music Awards, "Y Hubo Alguien" won the award for "Tropical/Salsa Hot Track of the Year". It also received the Lo Nuestro Award for Tropical Song of the Year in the same year. In the US, "Y Hubo Alguien" became the first salsa track to top the Billboard Hot Latin Songs chart; it spent three weeks on this position. It also topped the Tropical Airplay chart, becoming his eighth number one on the chart and remained on the spot for eight weeks. It ranked number nine on the 1998 Tropical Airplay year-end chart.

== Track listing ==
Spain promotional CD single

1. "Y Hubo Alguien" – 3:44
2. "Y Hubo Alguien" (radio edit) – 4:12

== Charts ==
=== Weekly charts ===
Chart performance for "Y Hubo Alguien"
Chart (1997)	Peak position
US Hot Latin Songs (Billboard)	1
US Tropical Airplay (Billboard)	1

=== Year-end charts ===
1998 year-end chart performance for "Y Hubo Alguien"
Chart (1998)	Position
US Hot Latin Songs (Billboard)	36
US Tropical Airplay (Billboard)	9

== See also ==
- List of number-one Billboard Hot Latin Tracks of 1997
- List of Billboard Tropical Airplay number ones of 1997
