= No Me Compares (album) =

Studio album by Frankie Negrón
- Released: September 28, 1998
- Genre: Salsa
- Length: 43:42
- Label: Warner Music Latina
- Producer: Sergio George

Frankie Negrón chronology
Con Amor Se Gana (1997)	No Me Compares (1998)	Lo Que Llevo Por Dentro (1999)

Singles from No Me Compares
- 1. "Agua Pasada" Released: September 1998; 2. "Princesa" Released: December 1998; 3. "No Me Compares" Released: 1999

No Me Compares (Don't Compare Me) is the second studio album by the American salsa singer Frankie Negrón, released on September 28, 1998.

== Track listing ==
No.	Title	Writer(s)	Length
1.	"Agua Pasada"	Gil Francisco	4:58
2.	"No Te Vayas"	Frankie Negron	4:27
3.	"Que Tengo Que Hacer"	Jorge Luis Piloto	5:06
4.	"Angel"	Gloria Estefan, Miguel Morejon, Jon Secada	4:55
5.	"Buscando Amor"	Henry Martinez, Fernando Osorio	4:39
6.	"No Me Compares"	Guadalupe Garcia, Sergio George	4:58
7.	"No Quedan Lagrimas"	Frankie Negron	5:09
8.	"Princesa"	Enrique Gonzalez	4:44
9.	"No Sé Que Haría Sin Ti"	Jorge Luis Piloto	4:46

== Chart performance ==
Chart (1998)	Peak position
U.S. Billboard Top Latin Albums	18
U.S. Billboard Tropical Albums	6

== Certification ==
Region	Certification	Certified units/sales
United States (RIAA)	Platinum (Latin)	100,000^{^}
^{^} Shipments figures based on certification alone.
