= César Concepción =

Puerto Rican musician, composer and bandleader (1909–1974)

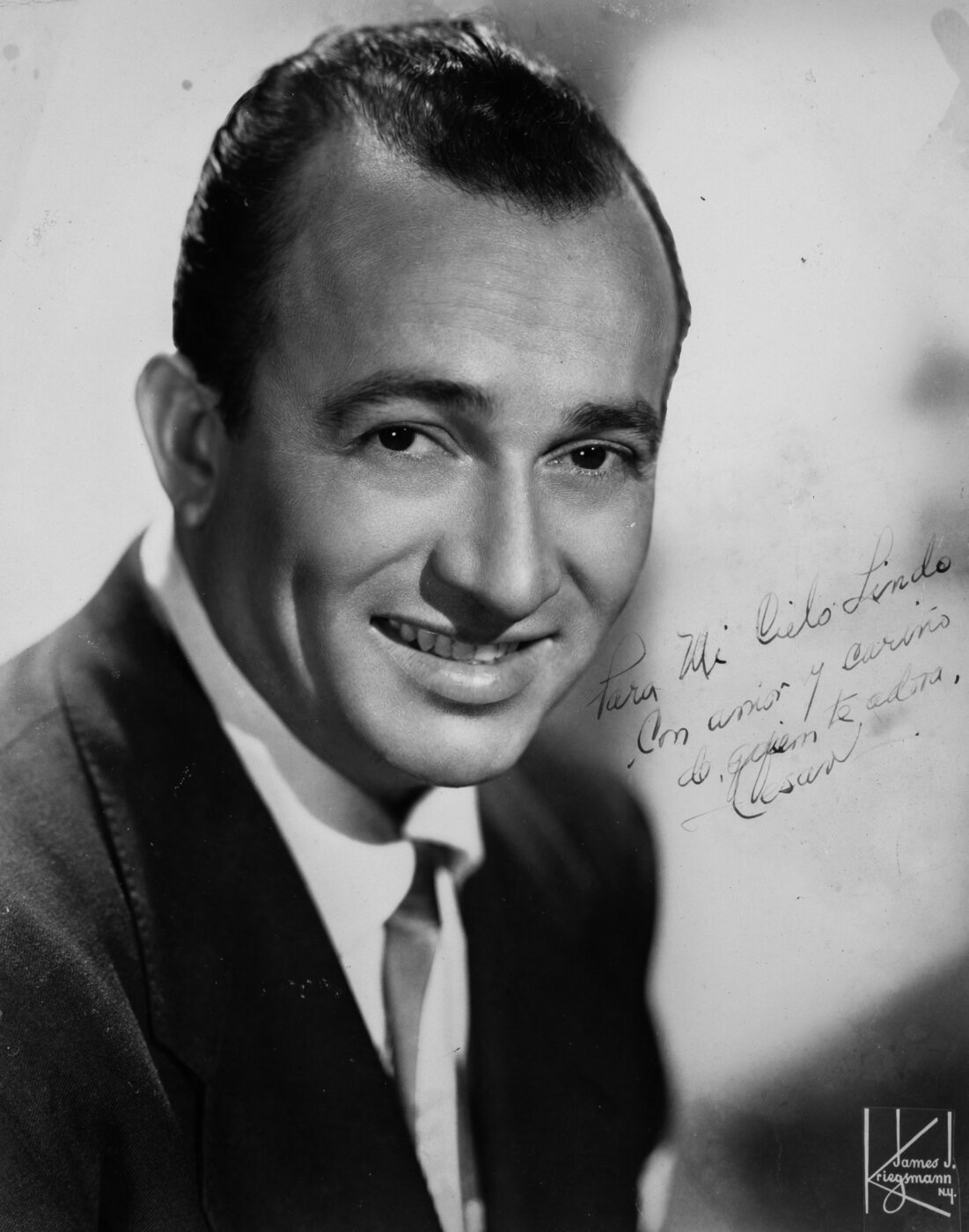

Background information
- Born: Cesario Concepción Martínez; July 28, 1909; Cayey, Puerto Rico
- Died: March 11, 1974 (aged 64) San Juan, Puerto Rico
- Genres: Plena, bolero, mambo, big band
- Occupations: Musician, songwriter, bandleader and record producer
- Instrument: Trumpet
- Years active: 1920s–1974

César Concepción (born Cesario Concepción Martínez; July 28, 1909 – March 11, 1974) was a Puerto Rican trumpeter, songwriter, bandleader and record producer. He is recognized as a central figure in the development of Puerto Rican popular music during the mid-20th century and is credited with modernizing the traditional plena by adapting it to a big band format known as plena de salón.

Concepción led one of Puerto Rico’s most popular orchestras and gained recognition both on the island and internationally, particularly in New York. His orchestra was noted for blending Afro-Caribbean rhythms with the instrumentation and arrangements of American swing bands.

== Early life and career ==
César Concepción was born in Cayey, Puerto Rico. He began studying music in his early teens and initially played trombone before transitioning to trumpet, which became his principal instrument.

By the late 1920s, he had traveled to New York, where he was exposed to the American big band and swing traditions. He performed in venues across the city, including dance halls and hotels, gaining experience that would later influence his orchestral style.

During the 1930s and early 1940s, he worked with various ensembles, including collaborations with established orchestras. His early exposure to U.S. swing bands informed his later approach to orchestration and performance.

== Rise to prominence ==
By the 1940s, Concepción had established his own orchestra, which quickly became one of the most prominent in Puerto Rico. His group was known for its polished sound, disciplined musicianship, and innovative arrangements that merged Caribbean rhythms with big band structure.

His orchestra performed extensively at major venues, including the New Yorker Hotel in San Juan, where it became a central attraction in the Manhattan Room.

Concepción’s popularity extended beyond Puerto Rico, with performances in New York and other international venues. His orchestra was frequently compared to leading American big bands in both structure and musical quality.

== Musical style and contributions ==
César Concepción is credited with transforming the traditional Puerto Rican plena into a more orchestrated and internationally accessible form. His adaptation, often referred to as plena de salón, incorporated elements of mambo, swing, and bolero into the traditional rhythmic base.

He composed more than 300 songs, including plenas, mambos, boleros, and other popular genres. His compositions contributed to the elevation of plena from a folk tradition to a mainstream musical form performed in formal dance settings.

Among his notable compositions is la plena “En la PAPA”, recorded by his orchestra and vocalist Joe Valle on Coast Records.

== Recording career ==
Concepción recorded extensively with his orchestra and collaborated with leading vocalists of the era. Among his principal collaborators was singer Joe Valle, who served as one of the main vocalists of his orchestra during its most successful period.

Recordings were released on multiple labels, including SEECO, RCA Victor, Verne and Coast Records among others. These recordings included both boleros and plenas, reflecting the orchestra’s versatility and broad audience appeal.

== “Cu Tu Gu Ru Jack, Jack” and chart success ==
Concepción was associated with the composition “Cu Tu Gu Ru Jack Jack” (also known as “Cu-Tu-Gu-Tu Jack”), which gained international attention in the mid-1940s. The song, recorded by the Armando Castro Orchestra and co-author (lyrics) by Concepcion, appeared among top-charting songs in the July 1945 issue of Hit Parader magazine.

This marked one of the earliest instances of a Puerto Rican-associated composition achieving recognition in U.S. popular music charts.

== Television and media ==
On March 31, 1954, Concepción and his orchestra appeared on the program Buscando Estrellas broadcast on WKAQ-TV (Telemundo Canal 2). This appearance is cited as one of the earliest televised performances by a musical orchestra in Puerto Rico.

He also participated in radio programs sponsored by major commercial brands, contributing to his widespread popularity across Puerto Rico.

== Orchestra and collaborators ==
The César Concepción Orchestra featured a large ensemble modeled on American big bands, including saxophone and trumpet sections. The orchestra included several notable musicians and vocalists over time.

Among them was his first singer Juan Ramón Torres, also known as “El Boy”, who appeared as a featured vocalist in promotional materials for the orchestra.

Other collaborators included prominent instrumentalists and vocalists who contributed to the orchestra’s distinctive sound.

== Influence and recognition ==
César Concepción’s orchestra was widely regarded as one of the most important musical ensembles in Puerto Rico during its peak years. His work influenced subsequent generations of musicians in both Puerto Rico and the broader Latin music world.

According to musicians and historical accounts, his orchestra was admired alongside leading Latin and American big bands. In later reflections on the era, bandleader Tito Puente identified the Concepción orchestra as among his favored ensembles.

== Personal life ==
In 1929, Concepción married Ana Vázquez and had 3 children. In 1971, married Elvira de Pena, her companion for 23 years and had 2 children. He was known for maintaining a disciplined lifestyle and dedication to his musical career.

== Death ==
César Concepción died on March 11, 1974, in San Juan, Puerto Rico.

== Legacy ==
Concepción’s contributions to Puerto Rican music include the modernization of plena and the establishment of a big band tradition on the island. His orchestra helped bridge Caribbean and North American musical styles and played a key role in shaping mid-20th century Latin popular music.

His life and legacy are the subject of ongoing research and documentation, including a documentary by director Jochi Melero and a forthcoming biography by Hugo Viera Vargas and archival work by the Fundación César Concepción.

== See also ==
- List of Puerto Ricans
