= Pa' Otro La'o =

Studio album by Chichí Peralta
- Released: July 1, 1997
- Genre: Merengue
- Label: Caiman Music; Sony Latin

Chichí Peralta chronology
Pa' Otro La'o (1997)	De Vuelta al Barrio (2000)

Singles from Pa' Otro La'o
- 1. "Amor Narcótico" Released: May 5, 1997; 2. "La Ciguapa" Released: September 8, 1997; 3. "Limón Con Sal" Released: November 3, 1997; 4. "Pa' Otro La'o" Released: January 12, 1998; 5. "Me Enamoré" Released: March 9, 1998; 6. "Procura" Released: May 11, 1998; 7. "Sol de Verano" Released: July 13, 1998

Pa' Otro La'o (To the Other Side) is the debut studio album by Dominican musician Chichí Peralta, released on July 1, 1997 by Caiman Music.

== Track listing ==
Pa' Otro La'o track listing
No.	Title	Length
1.	"Amor Narcótico"	5:14
2.	"La Ciguapa"	4:32
3.	"Pa' Otro La'o"	4:19
4.	"Un Día Más"	6:00
5.	"Sol de Verano"	5:24
6.	"Ella Tiene"	4:20
7.	"Procura"	4:30
8.	"Techno Son"	4:12
9.	"Me Enamoré"	4:20
10.	"Limón Con Sal"	4:54
Total length:		47:45

== Charts ==
Chart (1997)	Peak position
US Top Latin Albums (Billboard)	33
US Tropical Albums (Billboard)	7

== Certifications ==
Region	Certification	Certified units/sales
Argentina (CAPIF)	2× Platinum	120,000^{^}
Central America (CFC)	Platinum	25,000
Chile (IFPI Chile)	3× Platinum	75,000
^{^} Shipments figures based on certification alone.
