= Ángel Peña (musician) =

Puerto Rican musician (born 1948)

Background information
- Also known as: "Cucco"
- Born: September 1, 1948 (age 78)
- Origin: Santurce, Puerto Rico
- Genre: Salsa
- Occupations: composer, musician, singer, and record producer.

Ángel "Cucco" Peña (born September 1, 1948) is a composer, musician, singer, and record producer.

== Early years ==
Born in Santurce, a district in the Puerto Rican capital San Juan, Peña and his two siblings became interested in music at an early age. After completing their primary and secondary education, the Peña brothers attended the Conservatory of Music of Puerto Rico. Following his graduation, Peña joined the Panamericana Orchestra, which played various musical styles such as bolero, blues, jazz, rock, pop and salsa.

== Musical career ==
External audio
- You may listen to Peña's "Bomba E" interpreted by the "Coro Universitario de Mendoza" on YouTube.

During the 1960s, Ángel Peña's Orquesta Panamericana took over the role of El show del mediodía's band from César Concepción, playing traditional afro-Caribbean plena in response to what he perceived as generalized "whitewashing" of the genre.

After Peña left the band in 1980, he became a music director, producer, composer and arranger for a wide variety of singers and styles, such as Willie Colón, Olga Tañon, Gilberto Santa Rosa, Ricky Martin, Chayanne, Lissette, Ricardo Arjona, Luis Fonsi, José Feliciano, Celia Cruz, Franco de Vita, Willy Chirino, Juan Diego Florez, Marc Anthony, Lucecita Benítez, Glenn Monroig, Ilan Chester, Gloria Estefan, Jerry Rivera and Lunna. Peña believes that music can be seen from three perspectives: that of the artist, the music company; and his own. He works with all three to produce the music he believes people want to hear.

On June 4, 2021, Ángel "Cucco" Peña was the featured singer on Norberto Vélez's YouTube channel titled "Sesiones Desde La Loma Ep. 17".

== First digitally produced Puerto Rican album ==
Peña produced Motivos ('Motives'), the first digitally produced Puerto Rican album with the participation of Glenn Monroig and Lunna. In 1983, he married Lunna and had three children, Gabriel, Juan and Ángel. They later divorced and tragedy struck when their son died. In addition to music, Peña now also produces television commercials.

=== Awards and recognition ===
- Grammy for best tropical album, Contra la corriente, Marc Anthony (1999).
- Latin Grammy for best tropical production, Olga Tañon (2002)
- 60 Cuspide Awards
- 40 Addy Awards
- 20 Awards from the New York Theater Festival
- Agüeybaná de Oro Award (1993) for "Director of the Year"

== See also ==
- List of Puerto Ricans
- Puerto Rican songwriters
