= De Corazón =

Studio album by Gilberto Santa Rosa
- Released: December 9, 1997
- Genre: Salsa
- Length: 45:53
- Label: Sony Discos
- Producer: Gilberto Santa Rosa, José Lugo

Gilberto Santa Rosa chronology
Esencia (1996)	De Corazón (1997)	Expresión (1999)

Singles from De Corazón
- 1. "Que Se Lo Lleve el Río" Released: January 1998; 2. "Esa Parte de Mi (Perdona)" Released: February 1998

Professional ratings
Review scores
Source	Rating
Allmusic	4/5 stars

De Corazón (From the Heart) is the eleventh studio album recorded by Puerto Rican salsa singer Gilberto Santa Rosa released on December 9, 1997. It was nominated for Tropical Salsa Album of the Year at the 10th Lo Nuestro AWards.

== Track listing ==
This information adapted from Allmusic.

No.	Title	Writer(s)	Length
1.	"Que Se lo Lleve el Río"	Rodolfo Barreras	4:29
2.	"Esa Parte de Mi (Perdona)"	Osvaldo Noel Muñoz	3:47
3.	"Por Nada"	Gloria González, Rafy Monclova	4:28
4.	"Desde Que No Estás"	Yoel Henríquez	4:45
5.	"De los Dos la Esperanza"	Rafy Monclova	4:48
6.	"Yo Solo, Tu Sola"	Charlie Donato	4:57
7.	"No Digas Nada y Baila"	Rafy Monclova	4:15
8.	"Mala Palabra"	Paz Martinez	4:50
9.	"Cuanto Te Amé"	Rafy Monclova	4:53
10.	"Que No Me Da la Gana"	Rafy Monclova	4:46

== Chart performance ==
Chart (1997)	Peak position
U.S. Billboard Top Latin Albums	13
U.S. Billboard Tropical Albums	4

== Certification ==
Region	Certification	Certified units/sales
United States (RIAA)	Platinum (Latin)	100,000^{^}
^{^} Shipments figures based on certification alone.
