= El Destino (song) =

Single by Juan Gabriel and Rocío Dúrcal

from the album Juntos Otra Vez
- Released: 31 March 1997
- Length: 4:43
- Label: BMG Mexico
- Songwriter: Juan Gabriel
- Producer: Juan Gabriel

Juan Gabriel singles chronology
"Mi Pueblo" (1996)	"El Destino" (1997)	"La Incertidumbre" (1997)

Rocío Dúrcal singles chronology
"Que de Mi" (1996)	"El Destino" (1997)	"La Incertidumbre" (1997)

"El Destino" (transl. 'The Destiny') is a song by Mexican singer Juan Gabriel and Spanish songstress Rocío Dúrcal from their collaboration album Juntos Otra Vez. It was released as the lead single from the album on 31 March 1997. "El Destino" was nominated in the category of Pop Song of the Year at the 10th Annual Lo Nuestro Awards in 1998, but lost to "Si Tú Supieras" by Alejandro Fernández. The track won Song of the Year on the Pop/Ballad field at the 1998 ASCAP Latin Awards.

== Charts ==
=== Weekly charts ===
Weekly chart positions for "El Destino"
Chart (1997)	Peak position
US Hot Latin Songs (Billboard)	1
US Latin Pop Airplay (Billboard)	6
US Regional Mexican Airplay (Billboard)	6

=== Year-end charts ===
1997 year-end chart performance for "El Destino"
Chart (1997)	Position
US Hot Latin Songs (Billboard)	2
US Latin Pop Airplay (Billboard)	12

== See also ==
- Billboard Top Latin Songs Year-End Chart
- List of number-one Billboard Hot Latin Tracks of 1997
