= Esencia =

Studio album by Gilberto Santa Rosa
- Released: November 15, 1996
- Genre: Salsa
- Length: 57:06
- Label: Sony Discos
- Producer: Gilberto Santa Rosa, José Lugo

Gilberto Santa Rosa chronology
En Vivo Desde El Carnegie Hall (1995)	Esencia (1996)	De Corazón (1997)

Singles from Esencia
- 1. "No Quiero Na' Regala'o" Released: December 1996; 2. "Yo No Te Pido" Released: February 1996; 3. "Esas Lágrimas" Released: June 1997; 4. "Peligro" Released: August 1997

Professional ratings
Review scores
Source	Rating
Allmusic	4/5 stars

Esencia (Essence) is the tenth studio album recorded by Puerto Rican salsa singer Gilberto Santa Rosa released on November 15, 1996. It was nominated for Best Tropical/Salsa Album at the 9th Lo Nuestro Awards.

== Track listing ==
This information adapted from Allmusic.

No.	Title	Writer(s)	Length
1.	"No Quiero Na' Regala'o"	Perin Vazquez	4:42
2.	"Amándote"	Rafy Monclova	4:41
3.	"Esas Lágrimas"	Omar Alfanno	4:48
4.	"Yo No Te Pido"	Jorge Luis Piloto	4:39
5.	"Me Faltó"	Manny Benito	4:52
6.	"...Y Eso Duele"	Rafy Monclova	4:27
7.	"Para Vivir"	Pablo Milanés, Joan Manuel Serrat	4:13
8.	"Siempre Acabo Igual"	Omar Alfanno	4:56
9.	"No Ha Pasado Nada"	Armando Manzanero	5:09
10.	"Peligro"	Rafy Monclova	4:53
11.	"Dolía Menos"	Omar Alfanno	4:55
12.	"Yo No Quería Conocerte"	Rafy Monclova	4:51

== Chart performance ==
Chart (1996)	Peak position
U.S. Billboard Top Latin Albums	12
U.S. Billboard Tropical Albums	1

== Certification ==
Region	Certification	Certified units/sales
United States (RIAA)	Platinum (Latin)	100,000^{^}
^{^} Shipments figures based on certification alone.

== See also ==
- List of number-one Billboard Tropical Albums from the 1990s
