= Pau Brasil =

Municipality of Bahia, Brazil

- Municipality
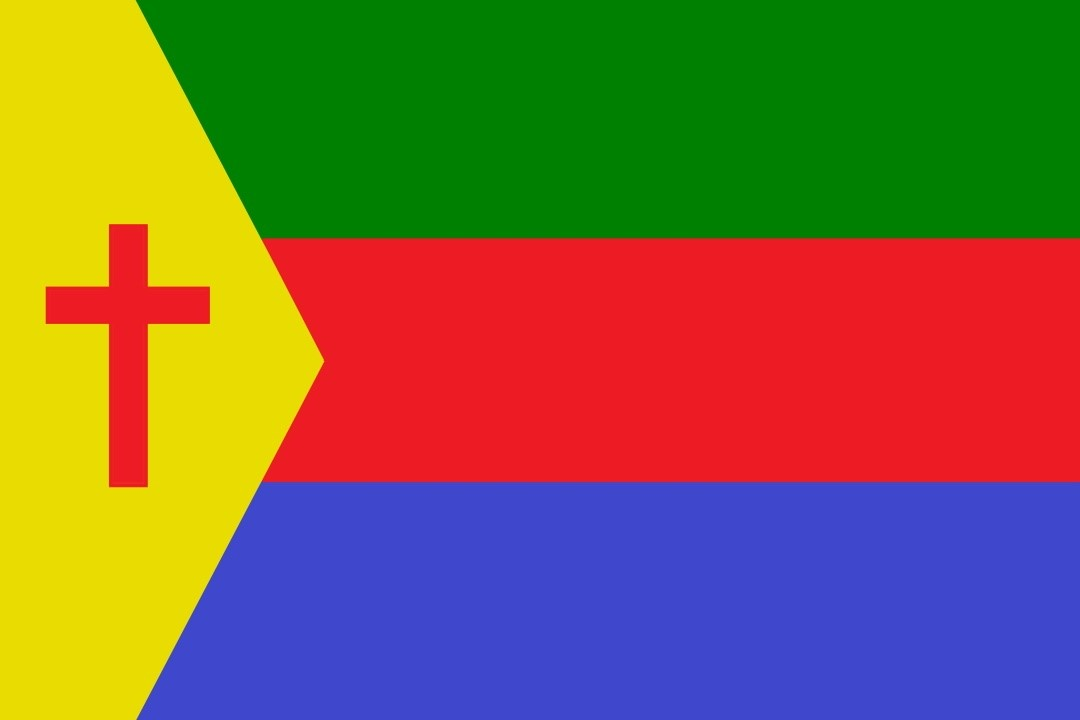
- Flag

- Location in Brazil
- Coordinates: 15°27′50″S 39°39′03″W
- Country: Brazil
- Region: Nordeste
- State: Bahia

Population (2020)
  - Total: 9,686
- Time zone: UTC−3 (BRT)

Pau Brasil is a municipality in the state of Bahia in the North-East region of Brazil.

== History ==
The creation of the municipality of Pau Brasil dates back to the early 20th century. The municipality was created from the establishment of the settlement of Santa Rosa in 1936 by Alfredo Santos and Antônio Alves de Souza. The occupation of the area close to Córrego da Água Preta, em 1930, happened due to the contact of Euclides Cerqueira and Valentin Rodrigues to the Ribeiro family with the aim of establishing the settlement.

In 1939, Santa Rosa stood out with the opening of its first open market, impulsed by the need of the population in buying and selling products, causing the local growth and economical development, even with the conflicts that occurred in the village and the struggles for land on the southern coast of Bahia, in which indigenous and fugitive people rebelled against the forms of government imposed by rudimentary accumulations of the caciques of São Jorge dos Ilhéus. This fight intensified through the 20th century while the agricultural cocoa monocultures were being exported, culminating in the spatialization of conflicts over “cocoa land” among “landless” workers. However, its development continued.

In Santa Rosa, there was an indigenous place (Paraguaçu) with 84 km2, which covered the nearby municipality of Itajú do Colônia. The measurement of its extension ended in 1933, when there were 475 indigenous people inhabiting the area. In 1951, Santa Rosa it was promoted to the category of district and in 1962 it reached the rank of Municipality with the name of Pau Brasil, due to two enormous reserves of the Pau-Brasil tree at the time. The Municipality is included in the microregion known as Microrregião Cacaueira.

== Demographics ==
In 2022, its population was estimated to be of 9,370 inhabitants according to that year's census, held by (IBGE), which represents a fall compared to the 2010 census, when the municipality had 10,852 inhabitants. According to the 2010 census, 5,495 inhabitants were male and 5,357 were female.

== Geography ==
The city is located in an area renowned for its hydrological and natural abundances, known for its rivers such as Rio Prata, Rio Água Preta and Rio Pardo, as well as smaller watercourses. Among its mineral resources, the dominant ones are crystal and marble.
