= Jefe de Jefes =

Studio album by Los Tigres del Norte
- Released: June 17, 1997
- Genre: Norteño
- Length: 63:38
- Label: Fonovisa

Los Tigres del Norte chronology
Unidos Para Siempre (1996)	Jefe de Jefes (1997)	Así Como Tú (1997)

Professional ratings
Review scores
Source	Rating
AllMusic	4/5 stars

Jefe de Jefes ("Boss of Bosses") is a studio album by Regional Mexican band Los Tigres del Norte. The album became their first number-one set on the Billboard Top Latin Albums chart, and received a nomination for a Grammy Award for Best Mexican/Mexican-American Album and Regional Mexican Album of the Year at the Lo Nuestro Awards of 1998.

== Track listing ==
The information from Billboard.

=== Disc 1 ===
No.	Title	Writer(s)	Length
1.	"Jefe de Jefes"	Teodoro Bello	3:35
2.	"El Sucesor"	Jessie Armenta	3:03
3.	"Por Debajo del Agua"	Bello	3:18
4.	"El Dolor de un Padre"	Armenta	3:38
5.	"También las Mujeres Pueden"	Frank Quintero	3:39
6.	"El Rengo del Gallo Giro"	Bello	3:07
7.	"Carne Quemada"	Bello	2:56
8.	"Mis Dos Patrias"	Enrique Valencia	3:33
9.	"El Prisionero"	Armenta	3:23
10.	"El Mojado Acaudalado"	Bello	3:43

=== Disc 2 ===
No.	Title	Writer(s)	Length
1.	"Ni Aqui Ni Alla"	Armenta	3:35
2.	"El Tarasco"	Paulino Vargas	3:42
3.	"La Paloma"	Sebastian Yradier	3:06
4.	"Jesus Amado"	Bello	3:09
5.	"Lo Que Sembre Alla en la Sierra"	Bello	3:01
6.	"El Plantón"	Bello	3:26
7.	"Las Novias del Traficante"	Francisco Quintero	3:15
8.	"El General"	Ricardo Ibarra, Bello	3:27
9.	"El Mojado Acaudalado (Acoustic)"	Bello	4:35

== Personnel ==
- Eduardo Hernández — arranger, art direction, mixing
- James Dean — engineer, mastering, mixing
- Arjan McNamara — mastering
- Joseph Pope — assistant engineer
- Los Tigres del Norte — mixing
- Hernán Hernández — band member
- Jorge Hernández — band member
- Luis Hernández — band member
- Oscar Lara — band member
- Alan Silfen — photography
- John Coulter — graphic design
- Erin Flanagan — stylist
- Bill Hernández — wardrobe

== Chart performance ==
Chart (1997)	Peak position
US Billboard Top Latin Albums	1
US Billboard Regional Mexican Albums	1
US Billboard Top Heatseekers	5
US Billboard 200	149

== Sales and certifications ==
Region	Certification	Certified units/sales
United States (RIAA)	Platinum	1,000,000^{^}
^{^} Shipments figures based on certification alone.

== See also ==
- List of number-one Billboard Top Latin Albums of 1997
