= A Pesar de Todo =

Studio album by Víctor Manuelle
- Released: June 3, 1997
- Recorded: November 1996 – May 1997
- Studios: Powerlight, Puerto Rico; Sir Sound, Inc., New York, NY
- Genre: Salsa
- Length: 43:09
- Label: Sony Discos
- Producer: Sergio George

Víctor Manuelle chronology
Victor Manuelle (1996)	A Pesar de Todo (1997)	Ironías (1998)

Singles from A Pesar de Todo
- 1. "Dile a Ella" Released: June 14, 1997; 2. "He Tratado" Released: September 13, 1997; 3. "Así es la Mujer" Released: January 17, 1998; 4. "El Águila" Released: March 24, 1998; 5. "No Hace Falta Nada" Released: May 5, 1998

Professional ratings
Review scores
Source	Rating
Allmusic	4/5 stars

A Pesar de Todo (Despite Everything) is the fourth album recorded by Puerto Rican salsa singer Víctor Manuelle, released on June 3, 1997. Under the record label of Sony Discos, Sony Tropical, and distributed by Sony Music Entertainment, this album signifies the consecration of Víctor Manuelle. It contains songs such as "Dile A Ella", "Así Es La Mujer", composed and written by Omar Alfano, "El Aguila," and the most successful single from the album, "He Tratado", composed by Manuelle himself. The latter song is considered, by salsa music experts, a flagship song of Salsa romantica.

== Background ==
After finishing his first successful album, Victor Manuelle, which was his first album to enter the Billboard Lists, the Puerto Rican singer recorded this album with the hopes that it would be more successful than the previous one, which he achieved, leaving hits such as "He Tratado", "Dile A Ella", and "Asi Es La Mujer".

== Track listing ==
This information adapted from Allmusic.

No.	Title	Writer(s)	Length
1.	"Así es la Mujer"	Omar Alfanno	5:09
2.	"Dile a Ella"	Gil Francisco	5:05
3.	"Nuestra Historia"	D.R.	5:05
4.	"Le Haré Feliz"	Omar Alfanno	5:02
5.	"He Tratado"	Victor Manuelle	5:03
6.	"No Hace Falta Nada"	Rudy Perez	4:52
7.	"El Águila"	Manuel Simonet Pérez	4:55
8.	"Remix: Apiádate de Mí, Voy a Prometerme, Como Una Estrella, Hay Que Poner el Alma"	Llado; Lugo	7:58

== Chart performance ==
Chart (1997–1998)	Peak position
U.S. Billboard Top Latin Albums	9
U.S. Billboard Tropical Albums	2
U.S. Billboard Heatseekers Albums	50

== Certification ==
Region	Certification	Certified units/sales
United States (RIAA)	2× Platinum (Latin)	200,000^{^}
^{^} Shipments figures based on certification alone.
