= Con Amor Se Gana =

Studio album by Frankie Negrón
- Released: May 20, 1997
- Genre: Salsa
- Length: 34:25
- Label: Warner Music Latina
- Producer: Rene Leyva, Pedro Gonzalez

Frankie Negrón chronology
Con Amor Se Gana (1997)	No Me Compares (1998)

Singles from Con Amor Se Gana
- 1. "Inolvidable" Released: June 1997; 2. "Hoy Me Vuelto a Enamorar" Released: August 1997; 3. "Una Gota de Lluvia" Released: 1997

Con Amor Se Gana (With Love You Win) is the title of the debut album by American salsa singer Frankie Negrón released on May 20, 1997.

== Track listing ==
This information adapted from Allmusic.

No.	Title	Writer(s)	Length
1.	"Inolvidable"	F. Baldoni, G. Carella, G. De Stefani, A. Repetti	4:35
2.	"Una Gota de Lluvia"	Luis Daniel Cabarcas	4:18
3.	"Hoy Me He Vuelto a Enamorar"	Jorge Luis Piloto	4:18
4.	"Echame a Mi Culpa"	Frankie Negron	4:53
5.	"En Busca de la Noche"	Eddy Ganz, George Mena	3:53
6.	"Fría como el viento"	Juan Carlos Calderon	4:28
7.	"Dile"	Enrique Gonzalez	4:17
8.	"Overjoyed"	Stevie Wonder	3:44

== Chart performance ==
Chart (1997)	Peak position
U.S. Billboard Top Latin Albums	28
U.S. Billboard Tropical Albums	4

== Certification ==
Region	Certification	Certified units/sales
United States (RIAA)	Platinum (Latin)	100,000^{^}
^{^} Shipments figures based on certification alone.
