= Chichí Peralta =

Dominican musician (born 1966)

Chichi Peralta
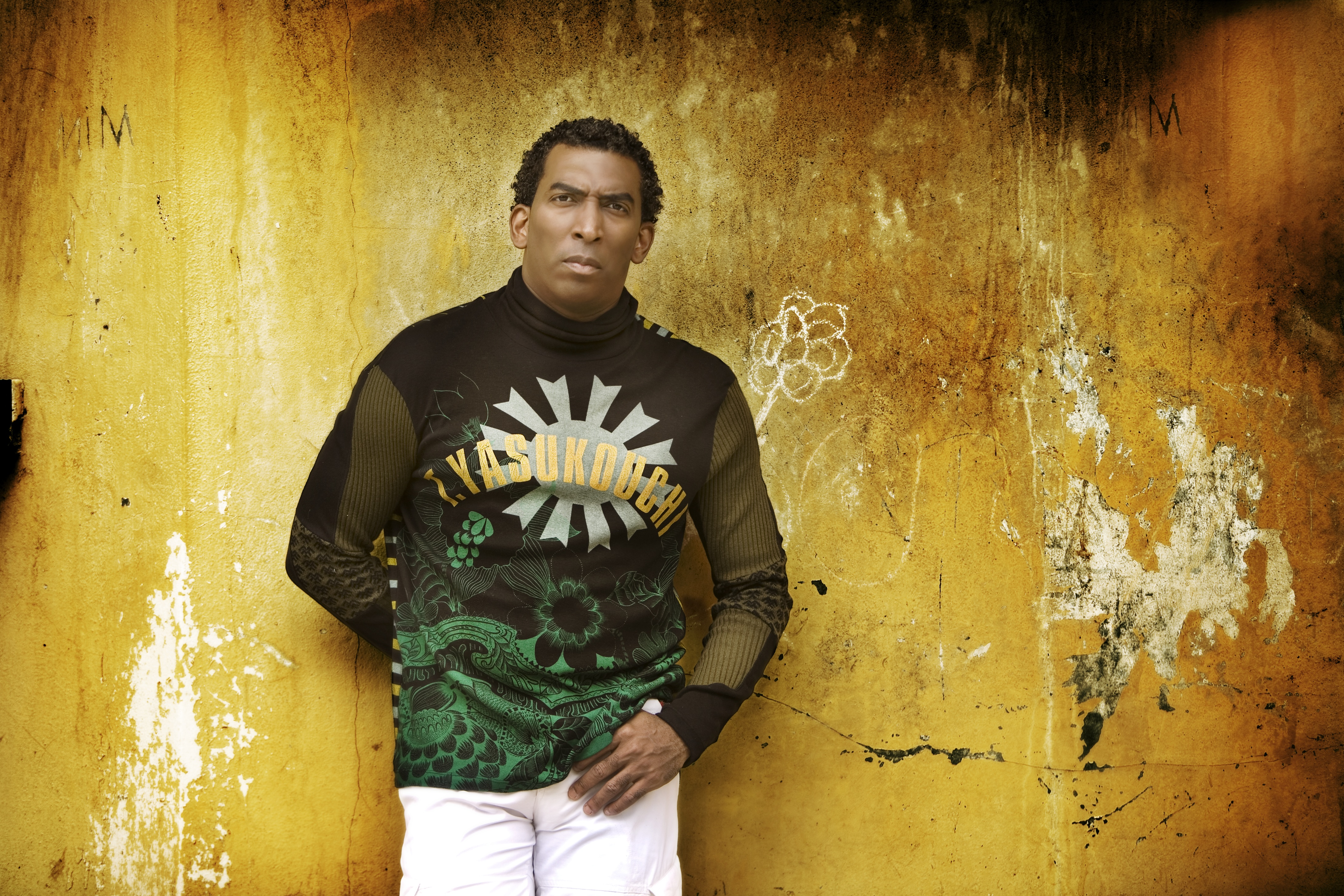
- Peralta in 2007

Background information
- Also known as: Chichi Peralta
- Born: Pedro René Peralta Soto; July 9, 1966 (age 60); Santo Domingo, Dominican Republic
- Origin: Santo Domingo, Dominican Republic
- Genres: Merengue, salsa, Latin pop, son, guaguancó, bachata
- Occupations: musician, songwriter, composer, record producer
- Instrument: Percussion
- Years active: 1995–present
- Labels: Sony Latin; Caiman Music
- Website: www.chichiperalta.com.do (in Spanish)

Pedro René Peralta Soto (born July 9, 1966), better known as Chichi Peralta, is a Dominican musician, songwriter, composer and producer.

His music is rich in fusion of Latin rhythms with elements of world music. He has combined the son music with jazz, merengue and pop, African rhythms, hip hop, rap, bachata, guaguancó, Brazilian rhythms, plena, salsa, vallenato, cumbia, symphonic textures, Arabic rhythms and exotic instruments from India and Japan, among others.

== Biography ==
Chichi Peralta was born on July 9, 1966, in Santo Domingo, capital of the Dominican Republic. His musical career began at the age of four, when he built his first drum.

The first album Peralta released was Trópico Adentro, but it was released independently and only in the Dominican Republic. His first album released internationally was Pa' Otro La'o, on which all the tracks were self-edited and produced. In 2000, he released the album De Vuelta al Barrio, which won the Best Merengue Album at the 2001 Latin Grammy Awards and great critical acclaim. In 2005 he released yet another album, Más Que Suficiente, which was nominated for Best Contemporary Tropical Album at the 2006 Latin Grammys, and also won many other international prizes. In 2007, Peralta was declared the Dominican Republic's goodwill ambassador for his contributions to Dominican culture. In 2009, he released his latest album De Aquel Lao' del Río which was released independently, and features a mixture of Dominican music genres with elements of world music. The album's first single was "Amor Samurai", which is a mix between Dominican bachata and Japanese music.

He has also composed the score of the documentaries Orgullo de Mi Tierra Samaná, Orgullo de Mi Tierra Puerto Plata and Orgullo de Mi Tierra Barahona and Camino a Higüey.

His iconic song Amor Narcotico was covered by the popular Latin American boy band CNCO for their 2021 cover album titled Déjà Vu.

== Discography ==
=== Studio albums ===
List of albums, with selected details
Title	Album details	Peak chart positions		Certifications
Title	Album details	US Latin	US Trop	Certifications
Pa' Otro La'o	Released: July 1, 1997; Label: Caiman Music; Format: CD, cassette	33	7	ASINCOL: 6× Platinum; CAPIF: 2× Platinum; IFPI CHI: Gold; IFPI PE: Platinum
De Vuelta al Barrio	Released: April 18, 2000; Label: Caiman Music; Format: CD	—	—	
Más Que Suficiente	Released: September 25, 2005; Label: Universal Music Latino; Format: CD	—	7	
De Aquel La'o del Río	Released: November 24, 2009; Label: 789 Music, Cutucupla-Records; Format: CD, digital download	—	—	
De Que Viene, Viene	Released: January 10, 2012; Label: 789 Music, Cutucupla-Records; Format: CD, digital download	—	—	

=== Singles ===
Song	Album
Fuego en la esquina Huellas; Llegó la hora Mosaico	Trópico Adentro
Amor Narcótico; La Ciguapa; Limón con sal Me enamoré Pa' otro la'o Procura; Sol de Verano	Pa' Otro La'o
Baila venga, Chichi; De Vuelta al Barrio; El beso de Judas; La Morena; Si no te veo	De Vuelta al Barrio
La Zalamera; Más Que Suficiente; Tamborada	Más Que Suficiente
Amor Samurái; La Negra Bella; Dominicano	De Aquel La'o del Río
Con Fe; La Hamaca de Dios; De Que Viene, Viene	De Que Viene, Viene
Inside Japan	Inside Japan Documentary
Mi ritmo Zumba; La Pastillita; Te Amaré	

== Awards ==
- Lo Nuestro Latin Music Awards, 1998 – Revelación del Año – Género Tropical (Breakthrough Artist of the Year – Tropical Genre)
- Latin Grammy Awards, 2001 – Best Merengue Album (De Vuelta al Barrio)
- Latin Grammy Awards, 2006 – Best Contemporary Tropical Album (Más que Suficiente)
- Lo Nuestro Latin Music Awards, 2007 – Tropical Merengue Artist of the Year
