= Con un mismo corazón =

Studio album by Ana Gabriel
- Released: 1997
- Recorded: 1997
- Genre: Rancheras; Regional
- Length: 39:20
- Label: Sony Internacional
- Producer: Ana Gabriel

Ana Gabriel chronology
| Vivencias (1996) | Con un mismo corazón (1997) | ...En la Plaza de Toros México (1998) |

Con un mismo corazón (English With the same heart) is the 13th studio album by Mexican pop singer Ana Gabriel. It was released on 1997. This material was produced by herself. Nine out of the 12 tracks were written by Gabriel herself, and these songs follow her typical way of lyrics about heartbreak and abandonment already established by composers like José Alfredo Jiménez. In fact, Gabriel covered one of Jimenez's songs with verve. The darkly toned "Me Equivoqué Contigo" (I made a mistake with you) shows the singer meeting the erroneous man at the altar of the church. It has the duet with the thunderous-voiced Vicente Fernández. Her delightfully raspy voice has never found a better companion. It was nominated for Regional/Mexican Album of the Year at the 10th Lo Nuestro Awards.

== Track listing ==
=== Original tracks ===
1. Con Un Mismo Corazón 03:37
2. Te Descubrí 02:47
3. Apesar de Todo 03:48
4. Guitarra Mía 03:34
5. Hasta Llegar Al Mar 02:59
6. Me Equivoqué Contigo 02:54
7. Gallo de Oro (Corrido) 02:31
8. Lo Poquito Que Me Queda 03:46
9. Paz en Este Amor 03:30
10. Por Un Error 03:19
11. Mi Amigo 03:09
12. Con Un Mismo Corazón 03:38 (duet with Vicente Fernández)

=== Bonus tracks ===
There is a special edition that includes one more song:

9- El Cigarrillo

== Album charts ==
| # | Chart | U.S. Peak Position |
|---|---|---|
| 1. | "Reg. Mex. Albums" | #1 |
| 2. | "Top Lat. Albums" | #7 |
| 3. | "Top Heatseekers (Pacific)" | #8 |
| 4. | "Heatseekers" | #47 |

- Note: This release reached the #1 position in Billboard Regional Mexican Albums staying for 35 weeks and it reached the #7 position in the Billboard Top Latin Albums staying for 39 weeks in the chart.

== Singles ==
- "Con Un Mismo Corazón" with Vicente Fernández
- "Paz en Este Amor"
- "Me Equivoqué Contigo"

== Certifications ==
| Region | Certification | Certified units/sales |
|---|---|---|
| Mexico (AMPROFON) | 2× Gold | 200,000^{‡} |
| United States (RIAA) | 2× Platinum (Latin) | 200,000^{^} |
^{^} Shipments figures based on certification alone.^{‡} Sales+streaming figures based on certification alone.
