= Frankie Negrón =

Salsa singer-songwriter

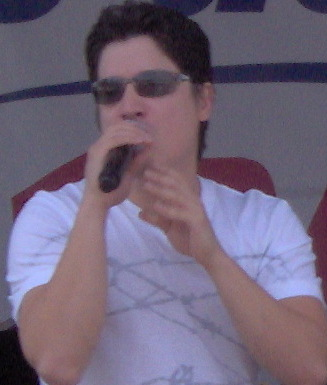

Background information
- Born: Frank Negrón; January 21, 1977 (age 49)
- Origin: Newark, New Jersey, United States; Puerto Rico
- Genres: Salsa music
- Occupation: Singer-songwriter
- Instrument: Vocals
- Years active: 1997–present
- Labels: WEA Latina, Univision, Airgo Music
- Website: frankienegron.com

Frankie Negrón (born January 21, 1977, in Newark, New Jersey) is a singer of salsa music and songwriter of Puerto Rican descent. He is among a group of notable young tropical singers and soneros who have woven a blend of pop, rock, gospel music, R&B, hip-hop, and reggaetón elements into their salsa, a group that includes Huey Dunbar, Charlie Cruz, and Kevin Ceballo. Siblings include a younger sister, Jaqueline Negrón (Jackie Negrón), who is also a singer and dancer, and a brother, David Negrón.

== Early life ==
Frankie attended Newark Arts High School in the early 90s gaining notoriety as part of an R&B singing group called Base Harmony (the other members at this time were Sean Pulley, Dionte Sutton, Kwhan Jarmond, and Bobby Bright). As part of Base Harmony, Frankie sang for audiences in the New Jersey Senate, Newark City Hall, The United in Group Harmony Association, and various clubs and venues around the tri-state area. It was during this period with Base Harmony that Frankie reinforced his already great vocal talents with an understanding of soul singing, complex group harmony, and stage performance that he'd draw from later in his musical career.

Fluent in both English and Spanish, Frankie was raised in New Jersey primarily as an English speaker, but developed his initial love of salsa from his father's record collection. He sings almost exclusively in Spanish, but converses and jokes with his audiences in both languages. The first of his seven studio albums to date, Con Amor Se Gana (roughly translatable as "Love Conquers All"), was released in May 1997. His last salsa release, Mejor Que Nunca ("Better than Ever"), was released in August 2006.

Frankie Negrón also has tried his hand at acting. Paul Simon, conducting an audition of Base Harmony for the Broadway musical The Capeman, immediately recognized Frankie as someone worth watching and gave him a supporting role in the play as part of the "Doo Wop Group Ensemble" (cast under the name Frank Negron ). Frankie and members of Base Harmony also participated in the recording of the play's soundtrack CD "Songs From The Capeman". Also, in 2000 Frankie starred as a struggling artist in the South Bronx in Val Lik's independent film, Boricua's Bond .

His singing career has been far more successful, evidenced by two Gold Album awards, for Con Amor Se Gana and No Me Compares ("Don't Compare Me"), and nine Billboard Top 40 Hot Latin Tracks to date. Frankie has also earned Grammy Award nominations, Billboard Award nods and two Premio Lo Nuestro Awards for Song of the Year. In an All Music Guide review, Frankie is referred to as "the genre's next definitive voice."

Negrón appeared on the American soap opera One Life to Live on August 5, 2009, to perform music from his then upcoming album Independence Day. on Airgo Music. The Jimmy Greco produced Independence Day was released in September 2009 as the singer's first crossover into the English market.

Negrón's CD got enthusiastic reviews, with Jon Pareles of the New York Times highlighting the CD in his Fall record release roundup. Airgo are currently in the process of re-releasing Independence Day with Negrón's performance of the Kara DioGuardi/David Cook penned song "No Reply," mixed by Tom Lord-Alge.

== Discography ==
=== Studio albums ===
- Con Amor Se Gana (1997)
- No Me Compares (1998)
- Lo Que Llevo Por Dentro (1999)
- Por Tu Placer (2001)
- Inesperado (2003)
- Amanecer Contigo (2005) (nominated at Lo Nuestro 2006 for the tropical album of the year)
- Mejor Que Nunca (2006) – produced by Sergio George & Diego Galé
- No Vuelvo Contigo (2007)
- Independence Day (2019)

=== Compilation ===
- Siempre Frankie (2003)

=== Singles ===
Sourcle: Allmusic 1997

- Inolvidable (Hot Latin Tracks No. 20, Latin Tropical Airplay #1)
- Hoy Me Vuelto a Enamorar (Hot Latin Tracks No. 5, Latin Tropical Airplay #1)
- Una Gota de Lluvia (Latin Tropical Airplay #14)

1998

- Agua Pasada (Hot Latin Tracks No. 3, Latin Tropical Airplay #1)
- Princesa (Hot Latin Tracks No. 8, Latin Tropical Airplay #2)

1999

- No Me Compares (Latin Tropical Airpaly #18)

2000

- Remolino (Hot Latin Tracks No. 28, Latin Tropical Airplay #6)
- Enamorado de Ti (Hot Latin Tracks No. 12, Latin Tropical Airplay #3)

2001

- Comerte a Besos (Hot Latin Tracks No. 25, Latin Tropical Airplay #2)
- Por Tu Placer (Hot Latin Tracks No. 30, Latin Tropical Airplay #5)

2003

- Mi Mulata (Latin Tropical Airplay #23)
- Hasta Que Te Enamores (Latin Tropical Airplay #13)

2005

- Lento (Latin Tropical Airplay #17)
- Todo Es Mentira (Latin Tropical Airplay #6)

2006

- No Vuelvo Contigo (Latin Tropical Airplay #24)

2009

- Holding on to Love/Adicto a Tu Piel (Latin Tropical Airplay #3)

2011

- Quemaré mi cama

== See also ==
- List of Puerto Ricans
