= List of Billboard Tropical Airplay number ones of 1994 and 1995 =

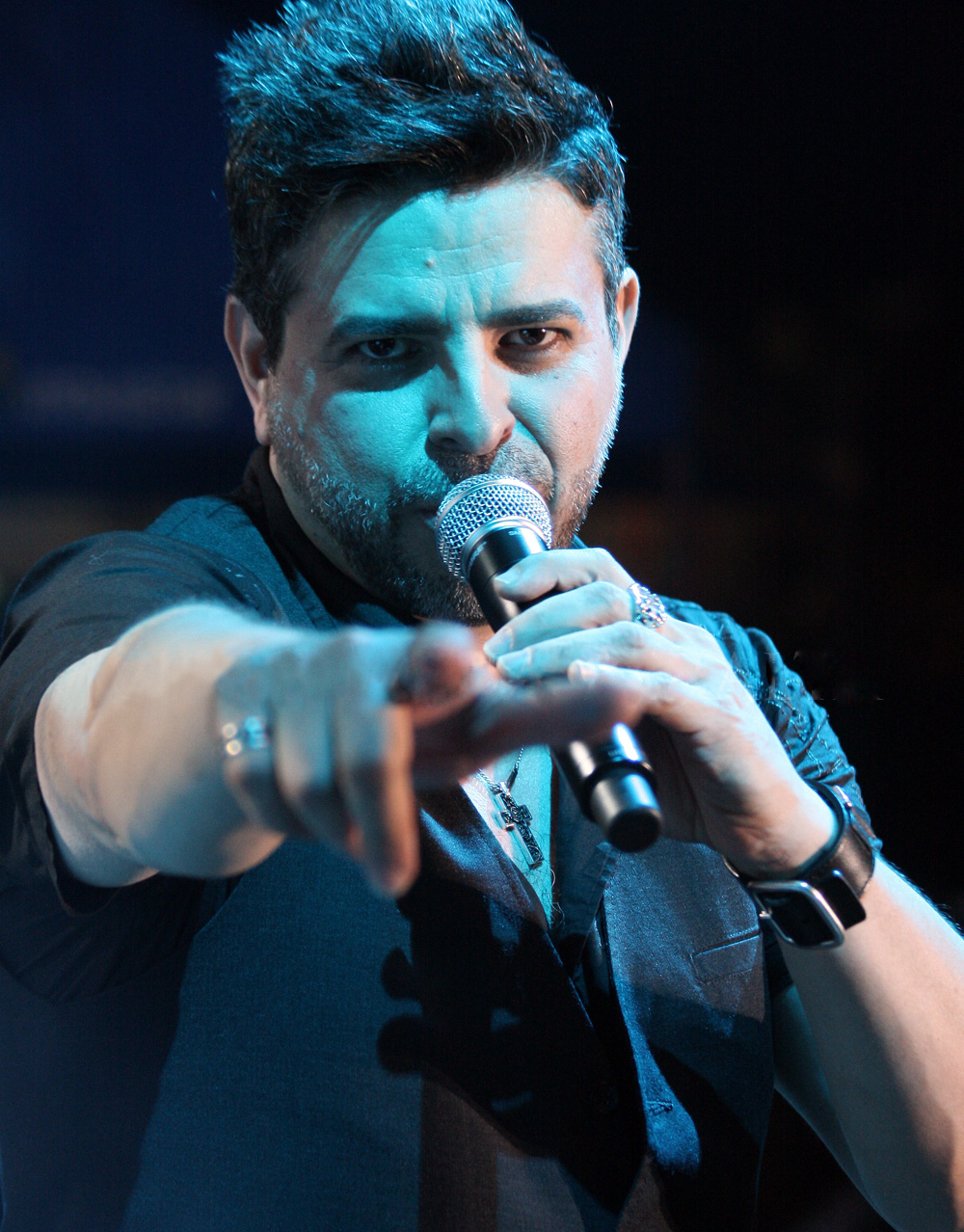
Luis Enrique was the first artist to reach number one on the Tropical Airplay chart in 1994.

In October 1994, Billboard magazine established Tropical Airplay, a chart that ranks the top-performing songs played on tropical radio stations in the United States based on weekly airplay data compiled by Nielsen's Broadcast Data Systems (BDS). It is a subchart of Hot Latin Songs, which lists the best-performing Spanish-language songs in the country. According to a 1985 article by Billboard, tropical music is the "sound of the Spanish-speaking Caribbean – though it extends beyond it". It usually encompasses dance genres such as salsa, merengue, bachata, vallenato, and the Colombian cumbia and tropical music in Mexico. Five songs topped the chart in 1994 and 12 tracks did the same in 1995. Until November 5, 1994, BDS ran test charts which only listed the number one song of the week on Billboard's electronic database.

The first song to reach number one on the Tropical Airplay chart was "Quién Eres Tú" by Luis Enrique which remained in the top spot for three weeks. It was replaced by La India's cover of "Nunca Voy a Olvidarte", making her the first female artist to reach the top of the chart. Both artists were the only acts to have more than one chart-topper in 1994. La India had the final number one song of the year with her rendition of "Ese Hombre" which was also the first at the start of 1995. La India and Gloria Estefan were the only female acts to reach number one in 1995.

Marc Anthony was the artist with the most songs at number one in 1995 with "Te Conozco Bien", "Se Me Sigue Olvidando", and "Nadie Como Ella". "Te Conozco Bien" held this position for the longest with eight weeks and was named the best-performing tropical song of the year by Billboard. Marc Anthony also had the final chart-topper of the year with "Nadie Como Ella". Cuban pianist Paquito Hechavarría collaborated with fellow Cuban artist Rey Ruiz on the track "Piano" for the 1995 album of the same name (although Ruiz was not credited for this release on Billboard's chart database) and spent six weeks on top of the chart. Ruiz himself achieved his first number one with "Estamos Solos". Edgar Joel and Johnny Rivera obtained their only chart-toppers in 1994 and 1995, respectively.

== Chart history ==
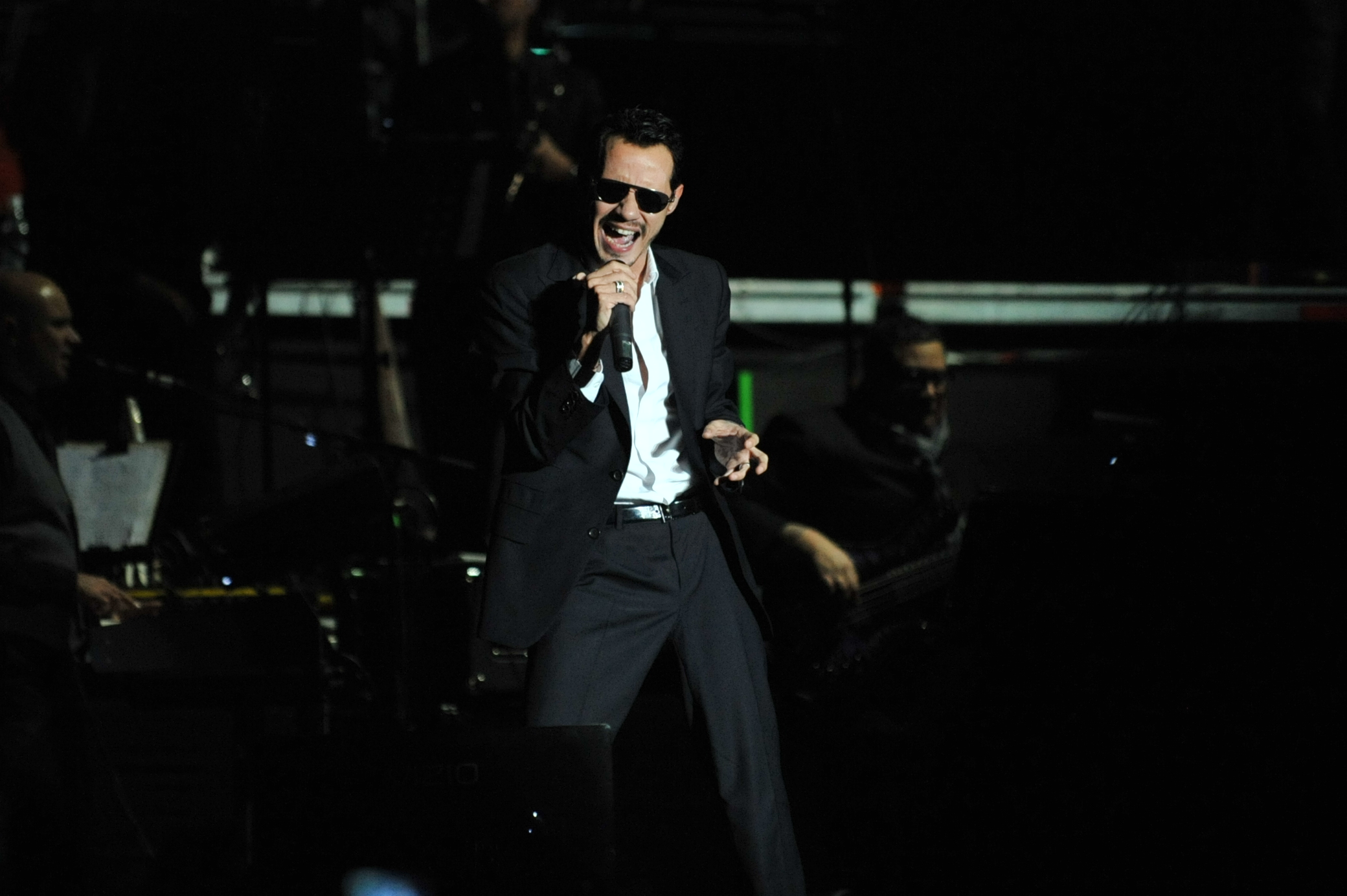
Marc Anthony had the most number one songs in 1995 with three.

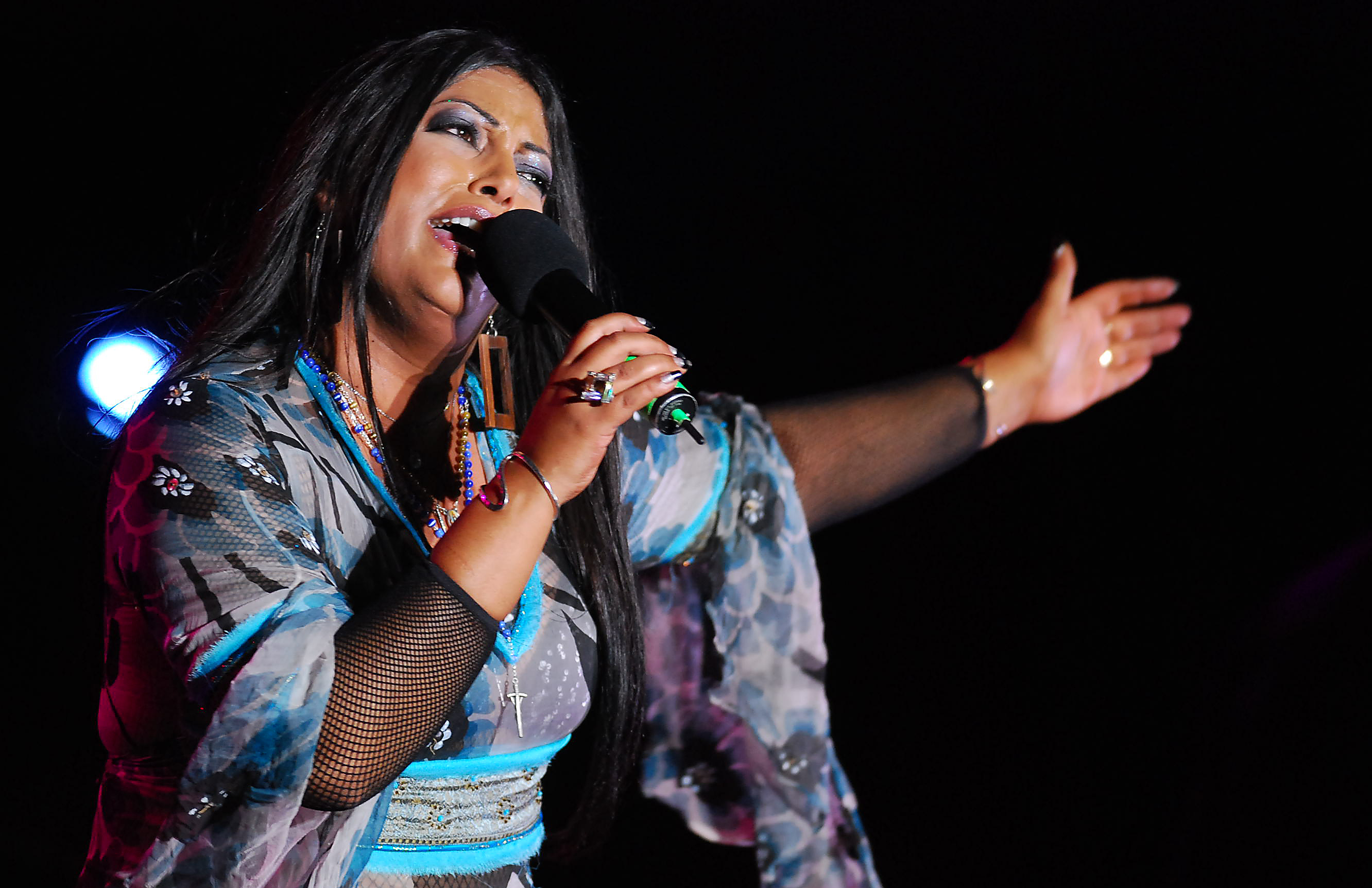
La India was the first female act to have a number one song on the Tropical Airplay chart.

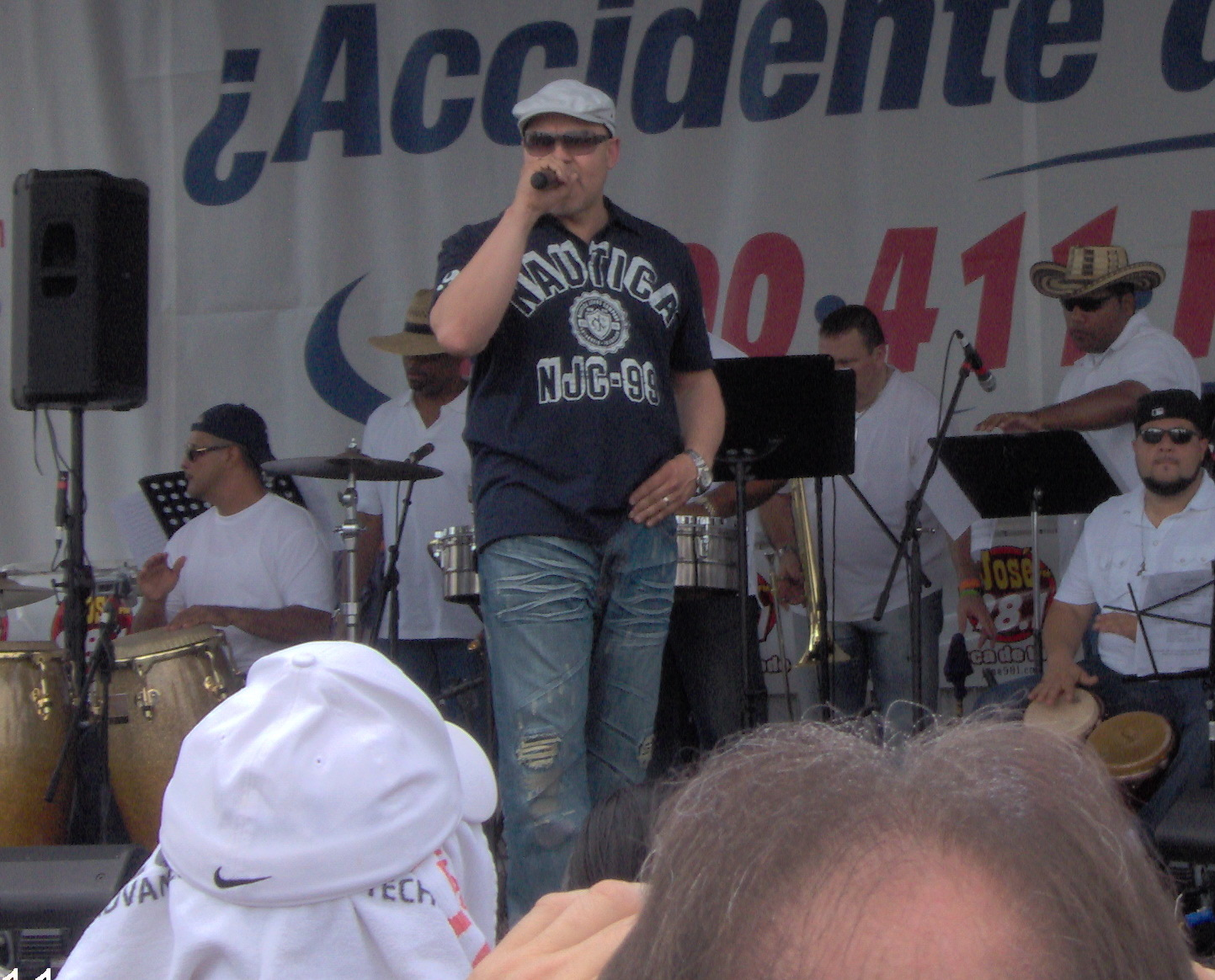
Edgar Joel achieved his only chart-topper in 1994 with "En las Nubes".

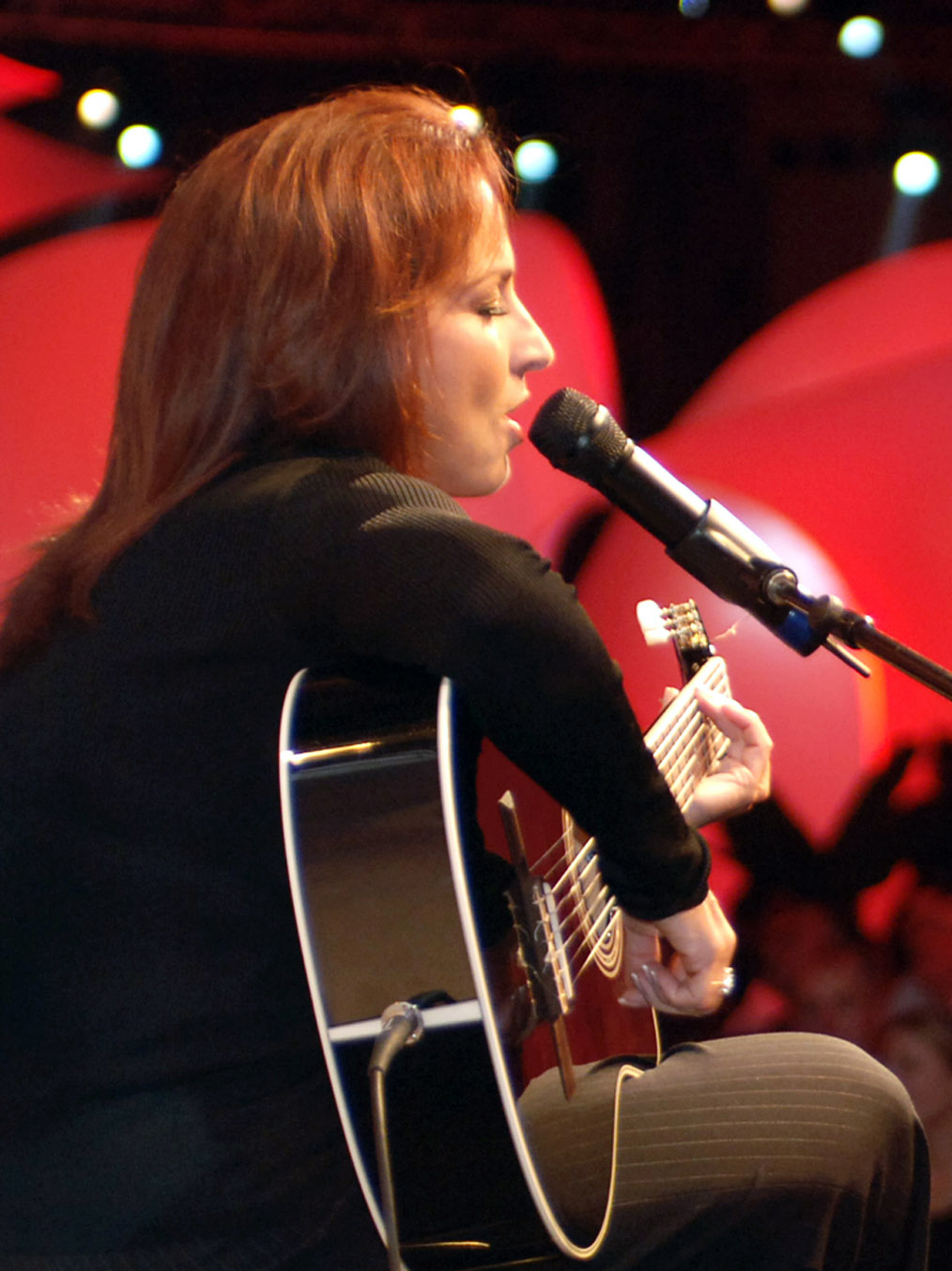
Gloria Estefan was one of two female acts to have a number one song in 1995.

Key
†	Indicates number 1 on Billboard's year-end tropical chart

Chart history
Issue date	Title	Artist(s)	Ref.
October 8, 1994	"Quién Eres Tú"	Luis Enrique	
October 15, 1994	"Quién Eres Tú"	Luis Enrique	
October 22, 1994	"Quién Eres Tú"	Luis Enrique	
October 29, 1994	"Nunca Voy a Olvidarte"	La India	
November 5, 1994	"Nunca Voy a Olvidarte"	La India	
November 12, 1994	"En las Nubes"	Edgar Joel	
November 19, 1994	"Así es la Vida"	Luis Enrique	
November 26, 1994	"Así es la Vida"	Luis Enrique	
December 3, 1994	"Así es la Vida"	Luis Enrique	
December 10, 1994	"Así es la Vida"	Luis Enrique	
December 17, 1994	"Así es la Vida"	Luis Enrique	
December 24, 1994	"Así es la Vida"	Luis Enrique	
December 31, 1994	"Ese Hombre"	La India	
January 7, 1995	"Ese Hombre"	La India	
January 14, 1995	"Ese Hombre"	La India	
January 21, 1995	"Ese Hombre"	La India	
January 28, 1995	"Ese Hombre"	La India	
February 4, 1995	"Mirándote"	Frankie Ruiz	
February 11, 1995	"Mirándote"	Frankie Ruiz	
February 18, 1995	"Mirándote"	Frankie Ruiz	
February 25, 1995	"Piano"	Paquito Hechavarría	
March 4, 1995	"Piano"	Paquito Hechavarría	
March 11, 1995	"Piano"	Paquito Hechavarría	
March 18, 1995	"Piano"	Paquito Hechavarría	
March 25, 1995	"Piano"	Paquito Hechavarría	
April 1, 1995	"Piano"	Paquito Hechavarría	
April 8, 1995	"Se Parecía Tanto a Ti"	Johnny Rivera	
April 15, 1995	"Se Parecía Tanto a Ti"	Johnny Rivera	
April 22, 1995	"Se Parecía Tanto a Ti"	Johnny Rivera	
April 29, 1995	"Se Parecía Tanto a Ti"	Johnny Rivera	
May 6, 1995	"Se Parecía Tanto a Ti"	Johnny Rivera	
May 13, 1995	"Estamos Solos"	Rey Ruiz	
May 20, 1995	"Estamos Solos"	Rey Ruiz	
May 27, 1995	"Estamos Solos"	Rey Ruiz	
June 3, 1995	"Estamos Solos"	Rey Ruiz	
June 10, 1995	"Estamos Solos"	Rey Ruiz	
June 17, 1995	"Te Conozco Bien" †	Marc Anthony	
June 24, 1995	"Te Conozco Bien" †	Marc Anthony	
July 1, 1995	"Te Conozco Bien" †	Marc Anthony	
July 8, 1995	"Te Conozco Bien" †	Marc Anthony	
July 15, 1995	"Te Conozco Bien" †	Marc Anthony	
July 22, 1995	"Te Conozco Bien" †	Marc Anthony	
July 29, 1995	"Te Conozco Bien" †	Marc Anthony	
August 5, 1995	"Te Conozco Bien" †	Marc Anthony	
August 12, 1995	"Esperándote"	Tito Rojas	
August 19, 1995	"Esperándote"	Tito Rojas	
August 26, 1995	"Esperándote"	Tito Rojas	
September 2, 1995	"Esperándote"	Tito Rojas	
September 9, 1995	"Se Me Sigue Olvidando"	Marc Anthony	
September 16, 1995	"Se Me Sigue Olvidando"	Marc Anthony	
September 23, 1995	"Se Me Sigue Olvidando"	Marc Anthony	
September 30, 1995	"Se Me Sigue Olvidando"	Marc Anthony	
October 7, 1995	"Se Me Sigue Olvidando"	Marc Anthony	
October 14, 1995	"Se Me Sigue Olvidando"	Marc Anthony	
October 21, 1995	"Abriendo Puertas"	Gloria Estefan	
October 28, 1995	"Abriendo Puertas"	Gloria Estefan	
November 4, 1995	"Abriendo Puertas"	Gloria Estefan	
November 11, 1995	"Si Una Vez"	Manny Manuel	
November 18, 1995	"Abriendo Puertas"	Gloria Estefan	
November 25, 1995	"Abriendo Puertas"	Gloria Estefan	
December 2, 1995	"Si Tú Superias"	Giro	
December 9, 1995	"Si Tú Superias"	Giro	
December 16, 1995	"Si Tú Superias"	Giro	
December 23, 1995	"Nadie Como Ella"	Marc Anthony	
December 30, 1995	"Nadie Como Ella"	Marc Anthony	

== See also ==
- 1994 in Latin music
- 1995 in Latin music
