= 1994 in Latin music =

This is a list of notable events in Latin music (music from Spanish- and Portuguese-speaking areas from Latin America, Europe, and the United States) that took place in 1994.

== Events ==
- March 1 – The 36th Annual Grammy Awards are held at the Radio City Music Hall in New York City.
  - Luis Miguel wins the Grammy Award for Best Latin Pop Album for his album Aries.
  - Gloria Estefan wins the Grammy Award for Best Tropical Latin Album for her album Mi Tierra
  - Selena wins the Grammy Award for Best Mexican-American Album for her album Live!.
- March 10 – BMI launches its own Latin music award to honor the best performing Latin songs of the year published by the company. "Otro Día Más Sin Verte" by Jon Secada is awarded Latin song of the year while Álvaro Torres is honored Latin songwriter of the year.
- May 16 - May 19 – The fifth annual Billboard Latin Music Conference is held at the InterContinental Hotel in Florida with the conference focusing on Brazilian music and Latin jazz for the first time.
  - The inaugural Billboard Latin Music Awards also takes place with Cuban-American singer Gloria Estefan being the biggest winners with three awards. Cuban singer Celia Cruz and Cuban musician Cachao are inducted into the Billboard Latin Music Hall of Fame.
- May 19 – The 6th Annual Lo Nuestro Awards are held at the James L. Knight Center in Miami, Florida. Cuban-American singer Gloria Estefan and American Tejano group La Mafia are the biggest winners of the ceremony with both receiving three awards.
- June 4 – National Academy of Recording Arts & Sciences approves a new category for Latin jazz album. The new award category is scheduled to debut on the following Grammy Award ceremony the next year. Despite being its appearance on the jazz field, Latin music committees are eligible to cast their vote on the award.
- June 18 – Selena became the first non-crossover act to have an album (Amor Prohibido; released March 1994) to enter the Billboard 200 since Luis Miguel's Aries (1993). The album was credited with popularizing Tejano music and catapulting the genre into an "unprecedented level of mainstream success"; eventually becoming the best-selling Tejano record of all-time. It holds the record for most weeks in the top ten of the Top Latin Albums chart—at 110 weeks—while the record holds the record for most weeks at number one on the Regional Mexican Albums chart at 96 weeks.
- November 12 – Billboard updates the methodology for the Hot Latin Tracks chart to incorporate the Nielsen Broadcast Data Systems (BDS). Billboard also launches three sub-charts of the Hot Latin Tracks chart: Latin Pop Airplay, Regional Mexican Airplay, and Latin Tropical Airplay.

== Bands formed ==
- Laura Pausini (Latin pop)
- Kairo (Latin pop)
- Mónica Naranjo
- Ana Bárbara
- Ezequiel Peña
- Giro
- Carlos Nuño

== Number-ones albums and singles by country ==
- List of number-one albums of 1994 (Spain)
- List of number-one singles of 1994 (Spain)
- List of number-one Billboard Top Latin Albums of 1994
- List of number-one Billboard Hot Latin Tracks of 1994

== Awards ==
- 1994 Premio Lo Nuestro
- 1994 Billboard Latin Music Awards
- 1994 Tejano Music Awards

== Albums released ==
=== First quarter ===
==== January ====
Day	Title	Artist	Genre(s)	Singles	Label
18	La Aventura	Orquesta de la Luz			RCA
25	El Tirador	Banda Vallarta Show	Banda, Cumbia, Ranchera		FonoVisa, FonoVisa
Unknown Day	Razones Para una Sonrisa	José Luis Rodríguez	Ballad, Soft Rock, Salsa		Sony Latin

==== February ====
Day	Title	Artist	Genre(s)	Singles	Label
2	Recuerda Siempre Que Te Quiero	Los Bondadosos	Cumbia		Mar International Records
16	Tu Ex-amor	El Tiempo	Ballad, Cumbia		Luna International, Luna International
22	Clasicos De La Provincia	Carlos Vives	Cumbia, Vallenato	"La Gota Fría" "Alicia Adorada" "El Cantor de Fonseca"	Sonolux

==== March ====
Day	Title	Artist	Genre(s)	Singles	Label
1	Mano a Mano	Silvio Rodríguez	Nueva Cancion, Nueva Trova		Ariola
13	Amor Prohibido	Selena	Tejano, Latin, Dance-Pop, Cumbia	"Amor Prohibido" "El Chico del Apartamento 512" "Techno Cumbia"	EMI Latin
15	Cariño De Mis Cariños	Lucero			FonoVisa

=== Second quarter ===
==== April ====
Day	Title	Artist	Genre(s)	Singles	Label
9	Da Lama ao Caos	Chico Science & Nação Zumbi	Hip Hop, Funk, Batucada		Chaos Recordings
12	¿Dónde Jugarán los Niños?	Maná	Pop rock	"Oye Mi Amor" "Vivir sin Aire" "Como Te Deseo" "Te Lloré un Rio"	Wea Latina
18	Zafra (1994)	Zafra Negra	Merengue		J&N Records, EMI Latin
19	Los Dos Plebes	Los Tigres del Norte			FonoVisa, FonoVisa

==== May ====
Day	Title	Artist	Genre(s)	Singles	Label
16	Tô Ligado Em Você	Sandy & Junior			

==== June ====
Day	Title	Artist	Genre(s)	Singles	Label
4	O Descobrimento Do Brasil	Legião Urbana	Pop rock		EMI, EMI
14	Piano de America, Vol. 2	Raúl di Blasio			
28	Gracias Por Esperar	Juan Gabriel			BMG, Ariola
28	Si Te Vas	Jon Secada	Ballad, Vocal		SBK Records, SBK Records, EMI Latin, EMI Latin
28	Una Mañana y un Camino	Ricardo Montaner	Ballad, Rumba, Vocal	"Quisiera" "No Te Pareces a Mi"	EMI Latin

=== Third quarter ===
==== July ====
Day	Title	Artist	Genre(s)	Singles	Label
11	Mucho Más Que Dos	Ana Belén and Víctor Manuel	Vocal		Ariola, BMG U.S. Latin
19	Recordando a Los Panchos	Vicente Fernández	Mariachi		Sony Discos, Sony Discos
22	Re	Café Tacuba		"El Aparato" "Esa Noche" "Ixtepec" "El Metro" "Las Flores"	Warner Music México, S.A. de C.V.

==== August ====
Day	Title	Artist	Genre(s)	Singles	Label
9	Ya Me Cansé	David Lee Garza y Los Musicales			
16	Luis Enrique	Luis Enrique	Salsa	"Así Son las Cosas" "Asi Es la Vida" "Quien Eres Tu"	Sony Tropical
23	Mónica Naranjo	Mónica Naranjo			Sony Latin
23	Amor Lunatico	Giro	Salsa		SDI
30	Esta Boca es Mía	Joaquín Sabina	Vocal		BMG Ariola S.A.

==== September ====
Day	Title	Artist	Genre(s)	Singles	Label
13	De Mi Alma Latina	Plácido Domingo	Classical		EMI, Angel Records, BMG Direct Marketing, Inc.
13	Sólo Contigo	Víctor Manuelle	Vocal	"Apiádate de Mí" "Voy a Prometerme" "Por Ejemplo"	Sony Tropical
20	Dicen Que Soy	La India	Salsa	"Nunca Voy a Olvidarte" "Ese Hombre" "Dicen Que Soy"	RMM Records
20	Formidables	Los Toros Band	Bachata, Merengue		Polydor

=== Fourth quarter ===
==== October ====
Day	Title	Artist	Genre(s)	Singles	Label
1	Sangrando	Caballeros de la Quema			Iguana Records
15	Calango	Skank	Reggae-Pop, Ska, Pop Music	"Jackie Tequila" "É Proibido Fumar"	Chaos
25	Siente el Amor...	Olga Tañón	Merengue	"Una Noche Mas" "Entre la Noche y el Día" "Es Mentiroso"	WEA Latina
25	Flaco Jiménez	Flaco Jiménez	Tejano		Aristas Texas

==== November ====
Day	Title	Artist	Genre(s)	Singles	Label
8	Navidad en las Americas	Various artists			
15	Siempre Contigo	Lucero	Vocal		FonoVisa
15	El Rey de Corazones	Manny Manuel		"Distanciado (La Foto)" "Pero Que Necesidad" "Se Acabo Lo Que Se Daba"	
22	De Cara al Viento	Gilberto Santa Rosa	Salsa		Sony Tropical
22	Tratar de Estar Mejor	Diego Torres			RCA, BMG U.S. Latin
29	Soundlife	Emilio Navaira	Tejano		EMI Latin

==== December ====
Day	Title	Artist	Genre(s)	Singles	Label
13	Maná en Vivo	Maná	Pop rock		WEA Latina
14	Myriam Hernández IV	Myriam Hernández			

=== Unknown ===
Title	Artist	Genre(s)	Singles	Label
Motivos del Alma	Vicente Fernández	Bolero		Sony Discos
Sexsacional...!	Lalo Rodríguez	Salsa		TH-Rodven
Love and Liberté	Gipsy Kings	Flamenco		Columbia
Guitar Passion	Charo			Universal Wave
Historias	Ricardo Arjona	Acoustic, Soft Rock, Pop rock	"Casa de Locos" "Historia del Portero" "Realmente No Estoy Tan Solo"	Sony Latin, Sony Latin
Palmas	Eddie Palmieri	Latin Jazz		Elektra Nonesuch
Severino	Os Paralamas do Sucesso	Folk		EMI, EMI, EMI
El Pan y la Sal	Presuntos Implicados			WEA Latina
El nervio del volcán	Caifanes	Alternative Rock	"Afuera" "Hasta Que Dejes de Respirar" "El Año del Dragon"	RCA
Master Sessions, Vol. 1	Cachao	Latin Jazz		Epic, Crescent Moon Records, CineSon
Fogaraté	Juan Luis Guerra & 4.40	Merengue, Salsa, Soukous		Karen Records
Pasiones	Ednita Nazario			EMI Latin
Crossroads	Jerry Gonzalez and the Fort Apache Band	Afro-Cuban Jazz	"Thelingus" "Viva Cepeda" "Elegua"	Milestone
El Camino del Alma	Cristian Castro	Soft Rock, Latin, Ballad		FonoVisa
Steel Rain	Jay Perez	Tejano		Sony Discos
Segundo Romance	Luis Miguel	Bachata, Bolero		WEA Latina, WEA Latina
Grandeza Mexicana	José José	Ballad		Ariola, BMG U.S. Latin
Recuerdo a Javier Solís	Vikki Carr	Bolero, Mariachi, Ranchera, Latin Pop		Globo Records, Sony Discos, Inc.
Influencias	Chayanne	Vocal, Ballad, Bolero, Samba		Sony Latin
Fina Estampa	Caetano Veloso	Tango, Rumba, Bolero	"Rumba Azul" "Contigo en la Distancia" "Fina Estampa"	Philips
Lo Nuevo y lo Mejor	Jerry Rivera	Salsa		Sony Tropical
Enamorate	Fama	Tejano		Sony Discos
Irrepetible	Celia Cruz	Salsa	"Bembelequa" "La Guagua"	RMM Records
Laura Pausini	Laura Pausini	Vocal, Ballad	"La Soledad"	WEA Latina
Explotó el Bombazo	Grupo Manía	Merengue		EM Records
Para Estar Contigo	Liberacion	Cumbia, Ballad, Ranchera		Fonovisa
Paulo Miklos	Paulo Miklos	Pop rock		WEA
A Mi Estilo	Tito Rojas	Salsa		Evesol
The Stonewall Celebration Concert	Renato Russo			EMI
Raimundos	Raimundos	Hardcore, Punk		Warner Music Brasil, Banguela Records
Samba Esquema Noise	Mundo Livre S/A		"Livre iniciativa" "Homero o junkie" "Musa da ilha grande" "Sob o Calçamento (Se espumar é Gente)"	Banguela Records
Verde, Anil, Amarelo, Cor de Rosa e Carvão	Marisa Monte	MPB		Metro Blue, EMI
Playero 37	DJ Playero	Reggaeton, Dancehall		Play Underground

== Best-selling records ==
=== Best-selling albums ===
The following is a list of the top 10 best-selling Latin albums in the United States in 1994, according to Billboard.

Rank	Album	Artist
1	Mi Tierra	Gloria Estefan
2	Segundo Romance	Luis Miguel
3	Love and Liberté	Gipsy Kings
4	Amor Prohibido	Selena
5	¿Dónde Jugarán los Niños?	Maná
6	Pura Sangre	Bronco
7	Gipsy Kings	Gipsy Kings
8	Romance	Luis Miguel
9	Inalcanzable	Marco Antonio Solís and Los Bukis
10	Vida	La Mafia

=== Best-performing songs ===
The following is a list of the top 10 best-performing Latin songs in the United States in 1994, according to Billboard.

Rank	Single	Artist
1	"Amor Prohibido"	Selena
2	"Vida"	La Mafia
3	"Luna"	Ana Gabriel
4	"Pero Qué Necesidad"	Juan Gabriel
5	"Si Te Vas"	Jon Secada
6	"Donde Quiera Que Estés"	The Barrio Boyzz and Selena
7	"Bidi Bidi Bom Bom"	Selena
8	"Quisiera"	Ricardo Montaner
9	"Detrás de Mi Ventana"	Yuri
10	"El Día Que Me Quieras"	Luis Miguel

== Births ==
- January 15 – Myke Towers, Puerto Rican rapper
- January 28 – Maluma, Colombian reggaeton singer
- March 10 – Bad Bunny, Puerto Rican reggaeton and trap rapper
- March 16 – Camilo, Colombian pop singer
- April 25 – Jay Wheeler, Puerto Rican reggaeton singer
- October 15 – Sebastián Yatra, Colombian pop singer

== Deaths ==
- February 8 – Amparo Ochoa, Mexican singer-songwriter
- July 17 – Sebastián Piana, Argentine tango composer
- November 21 – Santiago Chalar, Uruguayan physician traumatologist, poet, songwriter, musician, guitarist and singer
- December 8 – Antônio Carlos Jobim, Brazilian bossa nova composer

== Notes ==
- Novas, Himilce (1995). Remembering Selena (1st ed.). Sagebrush Education Resources. ISBN 0613926374.
- Richmond, Clint (1995). Selena! : The Phenomenal Life and Tragic Death of the Tejano Music Queen (1st ed.). New York, N.Y.: Pocket Books. ISBN 0671545221.
