= Estamos Solos =

1995 song by Rey Ruiz

"Estámos Solos"

Single by Rey Ruiz

from the album En Cuerpo y Alma
- Released: 1995
- Studio: Ocean VU Studio, Coral Gables, FL; Telesound, Hato Rey, Puerto Rico
- Genre: Salsa
- Length: 4:55
- Label: Sony Discos
- Songwriter: Jorge Luis Piloto
- Producer: Tommy Villarini

Rey Ruiz singles chronology
"Piano" (1995)	"Estámos Solos" (1995)	"Mitiendo" (1995)

"Estámos Solos" ("We're Alone") is a song written by Jorge Luis Pilot and performed by Cuban singer Rey Ruiz on his third studio album En Cuerpo y Alma. It was released as the first single from the album which Cashbox critic Héctor Reséndez called "simply perfect overall". Similarly, John Lannert of Billboard cited as "the album's best song". The track was recognized as one of the best-performing songs of the year at the 1996 ASCAP Latin Awards.

== Charts ==
Chart (1995)	Peak position
US Hot Latin Songs (Billboard)	14
US Tropical Airplay (Billboard)	1

=== Year-end charts ===
Chart (1995)	Position
US Tropical Airplay (Billboard)	4

== See also ==
- List of Billboard Tropical Airplay number ones of 1994 and 1995
