= Si Tú Supieras (Giro song) =

1995 song by Giro

Single by Giro

from the album Loco de Amor
- Released: 1995
- Studio: Ochoa Studios; Telesound Studios
- Genre: Salsa
- Length: 4:47
- Label: Sony Discos
- Songwriter: Omar Alfanno
- Producers: Johnny el Bravo, Cuto Soto

Giro singles chronology
"El Pasajero" (1995)	"Si Tú Supieras" (1995)	"Mi Forma de Sentir" (1996)

"Si Tú Supieras" ("If You Knew") is a song written by Omar Alfanno and performed by Puerto Rican salsa singer Giro for his studio album Loco de Amor (1995). It became his first number one song on the Tropical Airplay in the US. The track was recognized as one of the best-performing songs of the year at the 1996 ASCAP Latin Awards.

== Charts ==
Chart (1995)	Peak position
US Hot Latin Songs (Billboard)	15
US Tropical Airplay (Billboard)	1

=== Year-end charts ===
Chart (1995)	Position
US Tropical Airplay (Billboard)	15

== See also ==
- List of Billboard Tropical Airplay number ones of 1994 and 1995
