= Dicen Que Soy =

Studio album by La India
- Released: September 20, 1994
- Recorded: 1994
- Genres: Salsa, tropical
- Length: 44:52
- Language: Spanish
- Label: RMM
- Producer: Sergio George

La India chronology
Llego la India Via Eddie Palmieri (1992)	Dicen Que Soy (1994)	Jazzin' (1996)

Singles from Dicen Que Soy
- 1. "Nunca Voy a Olvidarte" Released: 1994; 2. "Ese Hombre" Released: 1994; 3. "Que Ganas de No Verte Más" Released: 1995; 4. "Dicen Que Soy" Released: 1995; 5. "O Ella o Yo" Released: 1995

Dicen Que Soy (They Say That I Am) is the third studio album by Puerto Rican recording artist La India released on September 20, 1994, by RMM Records. The album was produced by American musician Sergio George, who chose the songs for India to record with an emphasis on feminism to suit with her voice. The production mixes salsa music with other rhythms such as funk and timba. Five singles were released from the record with "Nunca Voy a Olvidarte" and "Ese Hombre" topping the Billboard Tropical Songs chart.

Dicen Que Soy was well received by music critics for the arrangement and selection of songs for the album. The success of the record led to India receiving a Billboard Latin Music Award and a Lo Nuestro nomination. In the United States, it peaked at number four and one on the Billboard Top Latin Albums and Tropical Albums charts respectively, and has sold over 140,000 copies as of 2000.

== Background ==
Following the release of her debut studio album, Breaking Night (1989), La India went on to produce When the Night is Over (1991), a collaboration between her then-husband Little Louie Vega and Marc Anthony. Both albums were recorded at the time when freestyle music's popularity was beginning to wane, and neither was a commercial success. India and Vega left Atlantic Records, as India wanted to pursue her singing career performing in Spanish. Three years later, American musician Eddie Palmieri, who had heard her singing on the radio, wrote and produced India's first Spanish-language record titled Llegó la India, via Eddie Palmieri (1992). Although it was a commercial success, her high-pitched vocals were criticized.

Subsequently, India was signed to Ralph Mercado's record label RMM. Her first recording under the label was a cover of Basilio's song "Vivir lo Nuestro", a duet with Anthony for the RMM compilation album Combinacion Perfecta (1993). It was released as a single where it peaked at number ten on the Billboard Hot Latin Songs chart. The record was produced by American musician Sergio George who picked the song for the duo as he felt it was the right track for them to perform, despite the pair not being close friends at the time. George said he took the recording as a "personal challenge" because he believed India's voice was "extraordinary".

== Recording and musical characteristics ==
Since house music at the time was her forte, I had her sing house style vocal riffs over the salsa tracks, even over where horn lines would normally go. Instead of hearing a horn "mambo" as usual, I gave you India doing her thing, which gave her an identity and sound that no one else had.

— Sergio George, Descarga.com.

For Dicen Que Soy, George picked songs that had been previously recorded by female Latin singers such as Rocío Jurado and Lupita D'Alessio, with a focus on feminist lyrics. George, India, and Shirley Marte also wrote love songs ("Dejate Amar" and "No Me Conviene") for the album and added India's cover of George Benson's song "I Just Want to Hang Around You" as a counterbalance, in case the feminist songs did not prove popular. When describing the production, India said that "This is me, my flavor in a tropical way, and showing what I can do with my voice." The theme of the title track's lyrics revolves the singer being criticized by gossips without caring about their opinions. Puerto Rican singer Tito Nieves is featured on the song "No Me Conviene" and "Vivir lo Nuestro" was included as a bonus track for the album. Musically, the production mixes romantic and hard salsa music along with funk and timba. The record took four months to complete.

== Singles ==
La India "Ese Hombre"
A 28 second sample of the track, "Ese Hombre", one of the songs that La India covers in the album.

"Nunca Voy a Olvidarte" was the first single to be released from the album. It peaked at number 11 on the Hot Latin Songs chart and number one on the Billboard Tropical Songs chart. The second single, "Ese Hombre", reached number 12 on the Hot Latin Songs chart and became her second number-one song on the Tropical Songs chart. "Que Ganas de No Verte Más" peaked at number 24 on the Hot Latin Songs and number two on the Tropical Songs charts. "Dicen Que Soy" and "O Ella o Yo" reached number five and seven respectively on the Tropical Songs chart.

== Reception ==
Professional ratings
Review scores
Source	Rating
AllMusic	4/5 stars
Latina	favorable

Even without a formal review, an editor for the website AllMusic gave Dicen Que Soy four stars out of five. An editor for Latina magazine wrote a positive review for the album calling her cover of "Nunca Voy a Olvidarte" "sensational" and "Vivir lo Nuestro" an "explosive live recording". India's recordings of "Ese Hombre" and "Dicen Que Soy" have been noted to be "anthems for female salsa lovers".

At the 6th Lo Nuestro Awards ceremony in 1995, Dicen Que Soy received a nomination for "Tropical Album of the Year", but lost to Siente el Amor... by Olga Tañón. In the same year, the album won the award for "Tropical/Salsa Album of the Year by a Female Artist" at the second annual Billboard Latin Music Awards. In the United States, it peaked at number four on the Billboard Top Latin Albums chart and number one on the Tropical Albums chart. According to Nielsen SoundScan, Dicen Que Soy has sold over 144,000 copies as of 2000.^{A}

== Track listing ==
All music is composed by Sergio George.

No.	Title	Writer(s)	Length
1.	"Nunca Voy A Olvidarte"	Roberto Belester	04:58
2.	"Que Ganas De No Verte Mas"	Alejandro Venazzi	04:50
3.	"Ese Hombre"	Manuel Alejandro; Ana Magdalena	04:41
4.	"Dicen Que Soy"	Guadalupe "Lupillo" Garcia; Sergio George	04:42
5.	"O Ella O Yo"	Juan Carlos Calderón	05:05
6.	"Dejate Amar"	George; India; Shirley Marte	05:05
7.	"I Just Want To Hang Around You"	Michael Sembello; Daniel Sembello	05:02
8.	"No Me Conviene" (Featuring Tito Nieves)	George; India; Marte	04:48
9.	"Vivir Lo Nuestro [Bonus track]" (With Marc Anthony)	Rudy Pérez	06:07

== Charts ==
=== Weekly charts ===
Chart (1995)	Peak position
US Top Latin Albums (Billboard)	4
US Tropical Albums (Billboard)	1

=== Year-end charts ===
Chart (1995)	Rank
US Top Latin Albums (Billboard)	13
US Tropical Albums (Billboard)	3

== Personnel ==
The following credits are from AllMusic and the Dicen Que Soy CD liner notes.

- Bobby Allende – bongos
- Richie Bastar – congas
- Luis Bonilla – trombone ("Nunca Voy a Olvidarte")
- Miguel Bonilla – arranger ("I Just Want to Hang Around You")
- William Cepeda – arranger ("Ese Hombre"), trombone
- Ronald Davidson – graphic design
- Eustace "Huey" Dunbar – background vocals
- Sammy García – congas
- Sergio George – arranger, music director, drum programming, engineer, keyboards, piano, producer, background vocals
- La India – lead vocals
- Ite Jerez – trumpet
- Ángel "Angie" Machado – trumpet ("Nunca Voy a Olvidarte")
- Damaris Mercado – art direction
- Ralph Mercado – executive producer
- Wes Naprstek – mixing assistant
- Tito Nieves – guest vocals ("No Me Conviene")
- Papo Pepin – congas
- Marc Quiñones – percussion, timbales
- Humberto Ramírez – arranger ("Que Ganas de No Verte Más")
- Johnny Rivera – background vocals
- Piro Rodriguez – trumpet
- Rubén Rodríguez – bass guitar
- Kurt Upper – mixing
- Albert Watson – photography

== See also ==
- 1994 in Latin music
- List of number-one Billboard Tropical Albums from the 1990s

== Note ==
A. According to the Recording Industry Association of America, sales for many salsa albums went unreported because venues selling the discs did not report to monitoring services.
