= Se Parecía Tanto a Ti =

1995 song by Johnny Rivera

Single by Johnny Rivera

from the album Déjame Intentarlo
- Released: 1995
- Studio: TeleSound Studios
- Genre: Salsa
- Length: 4:52
- Label: RMM
- Songwriter(s): Ricardo Vizuete
- Producer(s): Humberto Ramírez

Johnny Rivera singles chronology
"No Vale la Pena" (1994)	"Se Parecía Tanto a Ti" (1995)	"Esa Chica" (1995)

"Se Parecía Tanto a Ti" ("She Seems So Much Like You") is a song performed by American salsa singer Johnny Rivera on his studio album Déjame Intentarlo (1995). It was written by Ricardo Vizuete and released as the lead single from the album. José A. Estévez, Jr. of AllMusic listed as one of the album's highlights. The track was recognized as one of the best-performing songs of the year at the 1996 ASCAP Latin Awards. It became his first (and to date only) number-one song on the Tropical Airplay chart.

== Charts ==
=== Weekly charts ===
Chart (1995)	Peak position
US Hot Latin Songs (Billboard)	16
US Tropical Airplay (Billboard)	1

=== Year-end charts ===
Chart (1995)	Position
US Tropical Airplay (Billboard)	6

== See also ==
- List of Billboard Tropical Airplay number ones of 1994 and 1995
