= Nunca Voy a Olvidarte =

1993 single by Cristian Castro

Single by Cristian Castro

from the album Un Segundo en el Tiempo
- Released: 25 June 1993
- Genre: Latin pop
- Length: 5:07
- Label: Melody, Fonovisa
- Songwriter: Roberto Belester
- Producer: Alejandro Zepeda

Cristian Castro singles chronology
"Diez Mil Lagrimas" (1993)	"Nunca Voy a Olvidarte" (1993)	"Es Mejor Así" (1993)

Audio sample
- A 30-second sample of Nunca Voy a Olvidarte by Cristian Castro.: file; help

"Nunca Voy a Olvidarte"

Promotional single by Cristian Castro

from the album En Primera Fila: Día 1
- Released: 26 March 2013
- Recorded: 2012
- Genre: Latin pop
- Length: 3:57
- Label: Sony Music Latin
- Songwriter: Roberto Belester
- Producer: Aureo Baqueiro

"Nunca Voy a Olvidarte" (English: "I Am Never Going to Forget You") is a song written by Roberto Belester and first recorded by Mexican grupero band Bronco for their album Salvaje y Tierno (1991). In the song, the protagonist is leaving and vows to never forget the time he spent with his lover. In 1993, Mexican singer-songwriter Cristian Castro covered the song on his album, Un Segundo en el Tiempo. Castro's version peaked at number-one on the Billboard Hot Latin Songs chart in the United States, becoming his first number-one single.

The song received a Lo Nuestro and a Billboard Latin Music award for Pop Song of the Year. It earned an award for Latin Pop Song of the Year at the ASCAP Latin Awards of 1994. In the following year, Puerto Rican-American recording artist La India covered the song as the lead single from her album Dicen Que Soy which peaked at number eleven on the Hot Latin Songs chart, number thirteen on the Billboard Latin Pop Songs chart, and number-one on the Billboard Tropical Songs chart.

== Background and recording ==
"Nunca Voy a Olvidarte" was written by Mexican songwriter Roberto Belester for Bronco's album Salvaje y Tierno (1991). Belester composed songs for several well-known Mexican bands such as Los Yonic's and Los Bukis. The song tells of a protagonist who is leaving his lover and tells her that he is never going to forget her. In 1993, Mexican singer-songwriter Cristian Castro covered the song on his second studio album, Un Segundo en el Tiempo, which was produced by Alex Zepeda and released as the lead single from the album. According to Castro, he bought Salvaje y Tierno after hearing "Que No Quede Huella" on the radio and wanted to cover "Nunca Voy a Olvidarte" when he listened to it on the CD. The music video for Castro's cover was produced by Jorge Guerrero Fox Garza and filmed in Cuernavaca which features shots of Castro alone in an old country house near the fireplace and outside on the field remembering a woman he loved. The visual was nominated Latin Clip of the Year at the 1994 Billboard Music Video Awards, but ultimately lost to "Con Los Años Que Me Quedan" by Gloria Estefan.

== Reception ==
"Nunca Voy a Olvidarte" debuted in the Billboard Hot Latin Songs chart at number 31 in the week of 14 August 1993, climbing to the top ten two weeks later. The song peaked atop the chart 18 September 1993, replacing "Mi Tierra" by Gloria Estefan and was succeeded by "Guadalupe", by José & Durval, three weeks later. "Nunca Voy a Olvidarte" ended 1993 as the fourth best performing Latin single of the year in the United States. In Mexico City, the song reached number one on the ballads hit parade chart.

At the 6th Lo Nuestro Awards in 1994, "Nunca Voy a Olvidarte" won the award for Pop Song of the Year. In the same year, it was the Pop Song of the Year at the inaugural Billboard Latin Music awards. "Nunca Voy a Olvidarte" was also the "Song of the Year" at the 1994 Eres Awards. At the ASCAP Latin Awards of 1994, the song was awarded Latin Pop Song of the Year. In 2005, the title was used for a compilation album titled Nunca Voy a Olvidarte...Los Exitos. In 2009, the song was included on the compilation album La Historia de los Exitos by Fonovisa Records to celebrate the record label's 25th anniversary. In 2013, Castro re-recorded the song for his first live album En Primera Fila: Día 1. Four years later, Bronco performed the song live along with Castro on their album Primera Fila.

== Charts ==
=== Weekly charts ===
Chart (1993)	Peak position
US Hot Latin Songs (Billboard)	1

=== Year-end charts ===
Chart (1993)	Peak position
US Latin Songs (Billboard)	4

== Credits and personnel ==
Credits adapted from the Allmusic.

- Cristian Castro – vocals
- Roberto Belester – songwriting
- Alejandro "Alex" Zepeda – record producer, arranger

== La India version ==
"Nunca Voy a Olvidarte"

Single by La India

from the album Dicen Que Soy
- Released: 1994
- Recorded: 1994; DLG Studios (New Jersey)
- Genre: Salsa
- Length: 4:57
- Label: RMM
- Songwriter: Roberto Belester
- Producer: Sergio George

La India singles chronology
"Vivir lo Nuestro" (1994)	"Nunca Voy a Olvidarte" (1994)	"Ese Hombre" (1994)

In 1994, Puerto Rican-American recording artist La India covered the song on her album, Dicen Que Soy which was produced by Sergio George and released as the album's first single. It was picked by George for India to cover as he felt it was something women could relate to. India's version was included on the soundtrack for The 24 Hour Woman.

=== Reception ===
On the Hot Latin Songs chart, the song debuted at number twenty-one on the week of 15 October 1994 and peaked at number eleven three weeks later. On the Billboard Latin Pop Songs chart, the song debuted at number fifteen on the week of 5 November 1994 and peaked at number thirteen a week later. On the Billboard Tropical Songs, the song peaked at number-one on the week of 29 October 1994 replacing "Quien Eres Tú" by Luis Enrique and was succeeded by "En Las Nubes" by Edgar Joel two weeks later.

An editor for Latina magazine remarked India's cover as "sensational" and that it "flattens" Castro's version of the song.

=== Charts ===
Chart (1994)	Peak position
US Hot Latin Songs (Billboard)	11
US Latin Pop Airplay (Billboard)	13
US Tropical Airplay (Billboard)	1

== Credits and personnel ==
Credits adapted from the Allmusic and Dicen Que Soy liner notes.

- La India – vocals
- Roberto Belester – songwriting
- Sergio George – piano, keyboard programming, drum programming, chorus
- Ruben Rodriguez – bass guitar
- Papo Pepin – congas
- Sammy Garcia – congas
- Richie Bastar – congas
- Bobby Allende – bongos
- Marc Quiñones – timbales
- Ite Jerez – trumpet
- Angie Machado – trumpet
- Luis Bonilla – trombone
- William Cepeda – trombone
- Johnny Rivera – chorus
- Eustace "Huey" Dunbar – chorus

== See also ==
- Billboard Hot Latin Songs Year-End Chart
- List of number-one hits of 1993 (Mexico)
- List of number-one Billboard Hot Latin Tracks of 1993
- List of Billboard Tropical Airplay number ones of 1994 and 1995
