= En las Nubes =

1994 single by Gustavo Márquez

Song by Tito Livio

from the album Fíjate de Mi
- Released: 1993
- Genre: Latin pop
- Length: 3:22
- Label: Rodven
- Songwriter: Gustavo Márquez

"En las Nubes" ("In the Clouds") is a song written by Gustavo Márquez and first performed by Mexican ballad singer Tito Livio on his studio album Fíjate de Mi (1993). It was covered by Puerto Rican salsa singer Jerry Rivera on his fourth studio Cara de Niño(1993). Another salsa cover version of the song was recorded by American musician Edgar Joel on his studio album Me Atrapa la Noche (1994) with Anthony Colón providing the lead vocals for the song. Joel's version reached number-one on the Billboard Tropical Airplay chart. His cover was recognized as the best-performing song of the year at the 1995 ASCAP Latin Awards. Puerto Rican singer Julián singer covered it on his studio Siete Mañanas (1995). Julián's version peaked at number ten on the Latin Pop Airplay chart.

== See also ==
- List of Billboard Tropical Airplay number ones of 1994 and 1995
