= Quién Eres Tú =

Quién Eres Tú may refer to:

- "Quién Eres Tú" (Yuri song), 1990
- "Quién Eres Tú" (Luis Enrique song), 1994
- "Quién Eres Tú", 2004 song by Frank Reyes
- ¿Quién Eres Tú?", 2007 song by María José from the album María José
- ¿Quién eres tú?, a 2012 telenovela
