= Ese Hombre (Rocío Jurado song) =

1994 single by La India

Single by Rocío Jurado

from the album Señora
- A-side: "Señora"
- Released: 1980
- Recorded: 1979
- Label: RCA Records
- Songwriters: Manuel Alejandro, Ana Magdalena

"Ese Hombre" (English: "That Man") is a song written by Ana Magdalena and Manuel Alejandro and performed by Spanish recording artist Rocío Jurado for her studio album Señora (1979). It was released by RCA Records as a B-side to "Señora" in 1980. Lyrically, the song is about a womanizer who lures women into a wrongful relationship filled with lies and deceit.

In 1994, American salsa singer La India recorded the track for her first solo album, Dicen Que Soy (1994), which was produced by Sergio George. "Ese Hombre" is the salsa song responsible for La India's honorific title as the "Princess of Salsa", according to The New York Times. The recording received positive reviews and acclaim from media respondents. "Ese Hombre" peaked at number one on the US Billboard Tropical Songs chart and peaked within the top 20 on the US Billboard Hot Latin Tracks and Latin Pop Songs charts. The track became La India's second number-one single on the Tropical Songs chart behind, "Nunca Voy a Olvidarte".

== Background and release ==
In 1979, Rocío Jurado recorded "Ese Hombre" for her studio album Señora (1979). It was released by RCA Records as a B-side to "Señora" in 1980. The song was written by Manuel Alejandro and Ana Magdalena for the Spanish singer. Jurado sung a duet version with Rosario Mohedano during one of her live tours.

According to the lyrics, the protagonist is describing negative attributes about a former lover who uses a false identity to capture and lure women into deceitful ill-fated relationships.

== La India salsa version ==
"Ese Hombre"

Single by La India

from the album Dicen Que Soy
- Released: 1994
- Recorded: 1994
- Genre: salsa, tropical
- Length: 4:38
- Label: RMM
- Songwriters: Manuel Alejandro, Ana Magdalena
- Producer: Sergio George

La India singles chronology
"Nunca Voy a Olvidarte" (1995)	"Ese Hombre" (1994)	"Que Ganas de No Verte Más" (1995)
- La India "Ese Hombre" A 28 second sample of the track "Ese Hombre".

La India recorded the song for her second studio album, Dicen Que Soy (1994). Because of its heavy airplay on radios, the single boosted sales for the parent album.

RMM selected "Ese Hombre" among its top ten music videos for their compilation album RMM Best of Videos Vol. I (1997). "Ese Hombre" is a salsa song set in common time at 88 beats per minute.

=== Reception ===
Lise Waxer wrote in her book Situating Salsa: Global Markets and Local Meanings in Latin Popular Music, that "Ese Hombre" is a "strong feminist song". Virginia Marie Raymond wrote in her book Mexican Americans Write Toward Justice in Texas, 1973--1982 that the lyrics are "rousingly hostile", while John Lannert of Billboard magazine praised the recording's lyrical content calling it a "fiery, stand-up-to-that-man testimony". David Cazares of the Sun Sentinel called the track an "outrageous song that bashes an egotistical and womanizing man". Cazares believed the track suited La India because it revamped her salsa career.

Ramiro Burr of the San Antonio Express-News named "Ese Hombre" and another La India recording, "Nunca Voy Olvidarte" as "radio hits". Manuel Peter wrote that "Ese Hombre" is an "anthem for female salsa lovers". Larry Flick of Billboard, called the recording a "tropical purity". According to Jose Manuel Simian of The New York Times, "Ese Hombre" contributed to La India being named the "Princess of Salsa". Madeline Rodriguez of Gozamos.com named "Ese Hombre" the "perfect break-up song". Jim Allen of AllMusic, called the song a "propulsive, no-nonsense attack" that "deliver a resonant portrait of this contemporary salsa sensation."

=== Charts ===
Chart (1995)	Peak position
US Hot Latin Songs (Billboard)	12
US Latin Pop Airplay (Billboard)	8
US Tropical Airplay (Billboard)	1

=== Credits and personnel ===
Credits adapted from the Allmusic and Dicen Que Soy liner notes.

- La India – vocals
- Roberto Belester – songwriting
- Sergio George – piano, keyboard programming, drum programming, chorus
- Ruben Rodriguez - bass guitar
- Papo Pepin - congas
- Sammy Garcia - congas
- Richie Bastar - congas
- Bobby Allende - bongos
- Marc Quiñones - timbales
- Ite Jerez - trumpet
- Angie Machado - trumpet
- Luis Bonilla - trombone
- William Cepeda - trombone
- Johnny Rivera - chorus
- Eustace "Huey" Dunbar - chorus

== See also ==
- List of Billboard Tropical Airplay number ones of 1994 and 1995
