= Mirándote =

1994 song by Frankie Ruiz

Single by Frankie Ruiz

from the album Mirándote
- Released: 1994
- Studio: V.U. Recording
- Genre: Salsa
- Length: 5:02
- Label: Rodven
- Songwriter: Cheín García
- Producer: Vinny Urrutia

Frankie Ruiz singles chronology
"Hablame" (1994)	"Mirándote" (1994)	"Mi Formula de Amor" (1995)

"Mirándote" ("Looking At You") is a song written by Cheín García and performed by Puerto Rican salsa singer Frankie Ruiz on his 1994 studio album of the same name. AllMusic critic José. A Estévez cited the song as "one of his most popular ever". Héctor Reséndez of Cashbox noted that Ruiz "exploits his charismatic style" on the song. The track was recognized as one of the best-performing songs of the year at the 1996 ASCAP Latin Awards.

== Charts ==
Chart (1995)	Peak position
US Hot Latin Songs (Billboard)	17
US Tropical Airplay (Billboard)	1

=== Year-end charts ===
Chart (1995)	Position
US Tropical Airplay (Billboard)	8

== See also ==
- List of Billboard Tropical Airplay number ones of 1994 and 1995
