= Esperándote (Tito Rojas song) =

1995 song by Tito Rojas

Single by Tito Rojas

from the album Por Derecho Propio
- Released: 1995
- Studio: Tropical Brain, Puerto Rico
- Genre: Salsa
- Length: 5:17
- Label: Musical Productions
- Songwriter(s): Alicia Baroni
- Producer(s): Julio Gunda Merced

Tito Rojas singles chronology
"También Nos Duele" (1995)	"Esperándote" (1995)	"Lloraré" (1995)

"Esperándote" ("Waiting For You") is a song performed by Puerto Rican salsa singer Tito Rojas on his studio album Por Derecho Propio (1995). It was written by Alicia Baroni and released as the lead single from the album. The track was nominated in the category of Tropical Song of the Year at the 8th Annual Lo Nuestro Awards in the same year, ultimately losing to "Abriendo Puertas" by Gloria Estefan. The track was recognized as one of the best-performing songs of the year at the 1996 ASCAP Latin Awards. It became his first number one song on the Tropical Airplay chart.

== Charts ==
=== Weekly charts ===
Chart (1995)	Peak position
US Hot Latin Songs (Billboard)	12
US Tropical Airplay (Billboard)	1

=== Year-end charts ===
Chart (1995)	Position
US Tropical Airplay (Billboard)	7

== See also ==
- List of Billboard Tropical Airplay number ones of 1994 and 1995
