= Así es la Vida =

1994 song by Luis Enrique

Single by Luis Enrique

from the album Luis Enrique
- Released: 1994
- Studio: Power Light Studios, Puerto Rico
- Genre: Salsa
- Length: 4:42
- Label: Sony Discos
- Songwriter: Luis Enrique
- Producers: Cuto Soto, Luis Enrique

Luis Enrique singles chronology
"Quién Eres Tú" (1993)	"Así es la Vida" (1994)	"Románticos al Rescate" (1995)

"Así es la Vida" ("That's Life") is a song performed by Nicaraguan salsa singer Luis Enrique on his 1994 self-titled studio album of the same name. It was written by Omar Alfanno and released as the second single from the album. Lyrically, the song takes on a "humanistic tale". Its music video was filmed in Miami Beach and was nominated for Video of the Year at the 1995 Lo Nuestro Awards.

== Charts ==
=== Weekly charts ===
Chart (1994)	Peak position
US Hot Latin Songs (Billboard)	10
US Tropical Airplay (Billboard)	1

=== Year-end charts ===
Chart (1995)	Position
US Tropical Airplay (Billboard)	12

== See also ==
- List of Billboard Tropical Airplay number ones of 1994 and 1995
