= Piano (Paquito Hechavarría song) =

1994 song by Paquito Hechavarría featuring Rey Ruiz

Single by Paquito Hechavarría featuring Rey Ruiz

from the album Piano
- Released: 1994
- Genre: Salsa
- Length: 3:30
- Label: Sony Jazz
- Songwriters: Manny Benito, Jorge Luis Piloto
- Producer: Rey Nerio

"Piano" is a song written by Manny Benito and Jorge Luis Piloto and performed by Cuban musician Paquito Hechavarría for his studio album of the same name. The song features Cuban singer Rey Ruiz as the lead vocalist while an instrumental version of the song was included the album as well. The Cashbox critic Héctor Reséndez felt that the song "has all the right ingredients for success in the jazz and tropical music markets". However, Fernando Gonzalez of the Miami Herald called it a "generic salsa" and regarded Hechavarría's performance as "exact, if constrained, playing throughout. The track was recognized as one of the best-performing songs of the year at the 1996 ASCAP Latin Awards.

== Charts ==
Chart (1995)	Peak position
US Hot Latin Songs (Billboard)	20
US Tropical Airplay (Billboard)	1

=== Year-end charts ===
Chart (1995)	Position
US Tropical Airplay (Billboard)	3

== See also ==
- List of Billboard Tropical Airplay number ones of 1994 and 1995
