= Edgar Joel =

American salsa musician

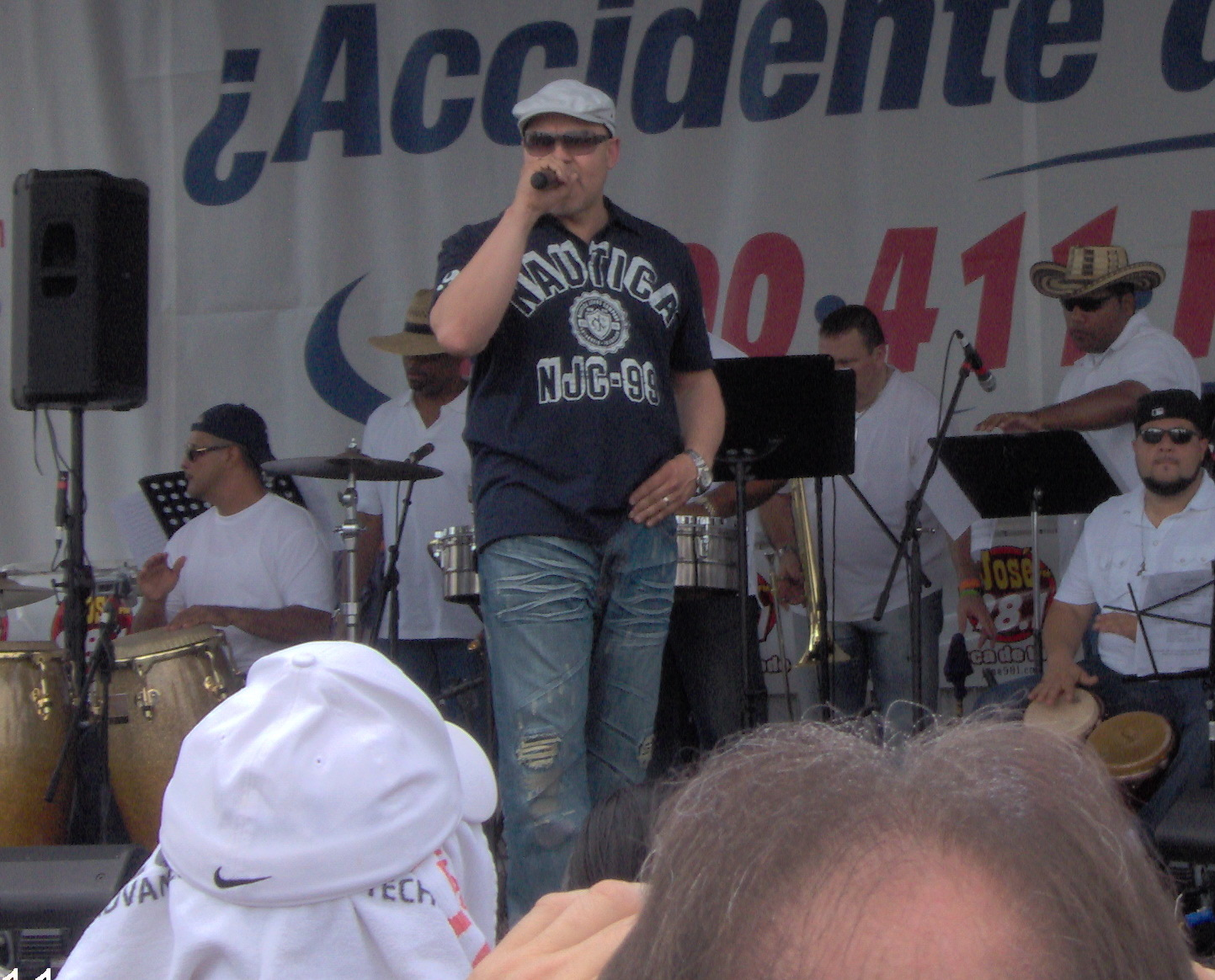
- Edgar Joel in 2011

Background information
- Born: August 30, 1961 (age 63); Philadelphia, Pennsylvania
- Genres: Salsa
- Instrument: Trombone
- Years active: 1990s–present
- Labels: Rodven

Edgar Joel (born August 30, 1961) is an American salsa musician, trombonist, and bandleader. He was born in Philadelphia to a Puerto Rican family originating from Barranquitas, Puerto Rico. As the bandleader of his self-titled band, he recruited Anthony Colón as the lead vocalist of the group. His first hit was a cover of Tito Livio's "Hasta El Sol De Hoy" which reached number 11 on the Billboard Hot Latin Songs which earned the band two Lo Nuestro nominations for Tropical New Artist of the Year and Tropical Song of the Year in 1994. Later in 1995, "En las Nubes" (also originally recorded by Livio) became their first number-one hit on the Billboard Tropical Airplay chart.
