= Paquito Hechavarría =

- Born: Francisco Hechavarría; 21 February 1939; Cárdenas, Matanzas, Cuba
- Died: 27 September 2012 (aged 73) Miami Beach, Florida, United States
- Genres: Latin jazz, Latin pop, big band, son cubano
- Occupation: Musician
- Instrument: Piano
- Labels: Panart, EGREM, Tania, Bongo Latino, Sony, Calle 54
- Formerly of: Orquesta Riverside, Conjunto Casino, Los Armónicos, Miami Sound Machine

Paquito Hechavarría (21 February 1939 – 27 September 2012) was a Cuban pianist. Hechavarría built his career in Cuba by playing in some of the most popular orchestras, including Conjunto Casino, Orquesta Riverside and Los Armónicos. However, he is primarily known for his later work with Miami Sound Machine, the band that catapulted Gloria Estefan to international stardom. He has collaborated with popular artists such as David Byrne, Santana and Christina Aguilera.

== Career ==
Paquito Hechavarría was born on 21 February 1939, in Cárdenas, Matanzas, Cuba. He moved to Havana to study piano at the Conservatory. In the 1950s, he began to play in important bands such as Orquesta Riverside, Conjunto Casino and Felipe Dulzaides y Los Armónicos. In 1960, he performed in Mongo Santamaría's Our Man in Havana and Walfredo de los Reyes' Cuban Jazz.

In 1962, Hechavarría moved to Miami. Two years later, he recorded a jazz album with percussionist Nelson "Flaco" Padrón, who was also a member of Los Armónicos and had moved to Miami as well. His first solo album, Piano sentimental came in 1965. In the 1970s, he was a member of Fly Out Band, recording the theme for ¿Qué Pasa, USA?. In 1978, he played the synthesizer on Ecué: Ritmos cubanos, an album by Louie Bellson and Walfredo de los Reyes. He recorded a solo LP, Piano alegre in 1980. In 1981, he formed a descarga ensemble called Walpataca with Walfredo de los Reyes, Cachao, and Tany Gil. He continued playing alongside Cachao, and he later played with Miami Sound Machine, recording the smash hit "Conga". He continued working with Gloria Estefan, appearing in albums such as Mi Tierra, Alma Caribeña and 90 Millas. In 1995, he collaborated with fellow Cuban singer Rey Ruiz on the song "Piano" from his album of the same name which topped the Billboard Tropical Airplay chart. He recorded his last solo album, Frankly, in 2009.

Paquito Hechavarría died on 27 September 2012, in his Miami Beach apartment.

== Discography ==
=== As leader ===
- Sentimental Piano (Bluebell, 1965)
- Piano alegre (Discolor, 1980)
- Paquito y su Tumbao: Latin Jazz (Bongo Latino/Kubaney, 1994)
- Piano (Sony, 1995)
- Frankly (Calle 54, 2009)

=== As sideman ===
With Louis Bellson and Walfredo de los Reyes

- Ecué: Ritmos Cubanos (Pablo, 1978)

With Jorge Cabrera y su Conjunto Yumurí

- La paella (Caney, 1980)
- Homenaje a Arsenio Rodríguez (Kubaney, 1981)

With Cachao

- Walpataca (Tania, 1981)
- Maestro de Maestros (Tania, 1986)

With Miami Sound Machine and Gloria Estefan

- Primitive Love (Epic, 1985)
- Let It Loose (Epic, 1987)
- Cuts Both Ways (Epic, 1989)
- Mi Tierra (Epic, 1993)
- Alma Caribeña (Epic, 2000)
- 90 Millas (Sony, 2007)
