= Caballeros de la Quema =

Argentine rock band

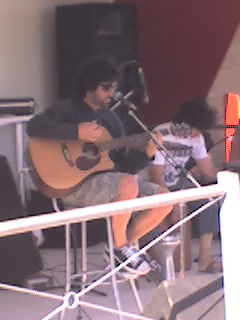
- Iván Noble, leader of the band

Background information
- Origin: Argentina
- Genres: Alternative rock
- Years active: 1990–2001
- Past members: Iván Noble (singer); Pablo Guerra (guitars); Martín Méndez (guitars); Alejandro Sorraires (sax); Martín “Cafusa” Staffolari (sax); Javier “Nene” Cavo (drums); Martín Carro Vila (bass)

Caballeros de la Quema (Spanish: Knights of the burning, "la quema" is a reference to the fans of Club Atlético Huracán) is an Argentine rock band, led by Iván Noble.

== Biography ==
The band was established in 1990, with the line-up of Iván Noble (singer), Pablo Guerra and Martín Méndez (guitars), Alejandro Sorraires and Martín “Cafusa” Staffolari (sax), Javier “Nene” Cavo (drums) and Martín Carro Vila (bass). They released their first CD, "Primavera Negra", in 1991. Their second work, "Manos vacías", was released in 1993, with the songs "Carlito" and "Patri". They played for Joaquín Sabina at the Arquitecto Ricardo Etcheverry stadium, and took part in a big concert with La Renga and Los Piojos at the 9 de Julio Avenue.

Carro Villa left the band, being replaced by Pato Castillo. The band made a new CD, "Sangrando", and played for Aerosmith. Sorraires left the band, which made another CD, "Perros, perros y perros". This CD included the song "No chamuyés" and had León Gieco as an invited artist.

"La paciencia de la araña" was recorded in 1998, with the famous song "Avanti morocha". The huge success led to a live album on the same year. The song does not have any political content, but it was used years later during the 2011 general election to promote the re-election of the president Cristina Fernández de Kirchner. They also included the song "Mothers", which talks about the Mothers of the Plaza de Mayo. Iván Noble became famous at the gossip magazines because of a brief romance with Natalia Oreiro. "Fulanos de nadie" was released in 2000, and "Otro jueves cobarde" in 2001. The band broke up in that year, and Iván Noble continued with a solo career.

== Members ==
- Iván Noble (singer)
- Pablo Guerra (guitars)
- Martín Méndez (guitars)
- Alejandro Sorraires (sax)
- Martín “Cafusa” Staffolari (sax)
- Javier “Nene” Cavo (drums)
- Patricio Castillo (bass)

== Discography ==
- Primavera negra - 1991
- Manos vacías - 1993
- Sangrando - 1994
- Perros, perros y perros - 1996
- La paciencia de la araña - 1998
- En Vivo Obras I&II - 1999 (Live album)
- Fulanos de nadie - 2000
- Obras cumbres I&II - 2006 (Greatest hits album)
