= Giro (singer) =

Puerto Rican musician (born 1971)

Jorge Manuel Lopez (born March 9, 1971), known as Giro Lopez, is a Puerto Rican salsa musician.

== Career ==
Lopez began his career as part of the Puerto Rican boy band Los Chicos. Two of his singles, "Si Tu Supieras" and "Mi Forma de Sentir", reached #1 on the Latin Tropical Airplay chart. In 1995, Lopez received a Lo Nuestro award for "New Tropical Singer of the Year", and he was nominated for "Best Male Tropical Singer of the Year" in 1996. He won a Gold Record at the New Jersey OTT Awards (National Songwriters Contest), presented by Billboard magazine.

He was signed to Sony Music (SDI - Sony Discos International) from 1988 until 2000.

His 2002 album, Mi Nostalgia, received a Latin Grammy nomination for "Best Salsa Album". His 2011 CD release on Giro Productions and Oriente Music Group "Todavia Hay Amor" was produced by Cuto Soto and Gunda Merced. It contains three compositions, "Se Que Perdi," "No Te Puedo Olvidar" and "Llegaste," by salsa songwriter and composer Pedro Azael and a re-recorded version of his early hit "Me he enamorado," written by Pepe Luis Soto. The song that received the most airplay on Latin music stations was a duet with La India of "Islas En El Mar," the Spanish version of "Islands in the Stream", first recorded by Kenny Rogers and Dolly Parton.

As a solo artist, Lopez has performed and collaborated with Marc Anthony, Ruben Blades, Luis Enrique, Willie Colón, Frankie Ruiz, Rey Ruiz, Eddie Santiago, Gilberto Santa Rosa, Tito Rojas, Víctor Manuelle, and Jerry Rivera. On February 12, 2011, he appeared at the 'Best of the 1990s' show at Trump Plaza in New York City, along with other salsa artists such as La India, Tito Nieves, Tony Vega, Jerry Rivera, Eddie Santiago, Lalo Rodriguez, and Tito Rojas. In May 2011 Lopez appeared at the New Orleans Jazz Festival.

In addition to large Latin music markets in the USA like Miami, Chicago, Los Angeles, Texas and New York City, Lopez has penetrated into Europe and Asia and also the Caribbean and Central and South American tropical music markets, spending six months in Brazil alone between São Paulo, Rio de Janeiro, and Recife, and touring heavily in 2011 throughout Colombia, Peru, Venezuela, Panama, Nicaragua, Costa Rica, the Dominican Republic, Canada and Puerto Rico. As of 2013, Lopez was managed by Chino Rodriguez.

== Discography ==
In the 1990s, Lopez launched a solo career, and has since released albums including:

- Simplemente Un Corazón (Sony U.S. Latin, 1993)
- Amor Lunático (Sony Latin, 1994)
- Loco Corazón (Sony U.S. Latin, 1995)
- Historias de Amor (Sony U.S. Latin, 1997)
- Giro (Sony Discos, 1999)
- Quinceañera (Sony Special, 1999)
- Mi Nostalgia (Musical Productions, 2002)
- Todavía Hay Amor (Oriente Music Group, 2010)
