= Quién Eres Tú (Luis Enrique song) =

1994 song by Luis Enrique

Single by Luis Enrique

from the album Luis Enrique
- Released: 1994
- Studio: Power Light Studios, Puerto Rico
- Genre: Salsa
- Length: 4:52
- Label: Sony Discos
- Songwriter: Luis Enrique
- Producers: Cuto Soto, Luis Enrique

Luis Enrique singles chronology
"La Mañana" (1993)	"Quién Eres Tú" (1994)	"Así es la Vida" (1994)

"Quién Eres Tú" ("Who Are You") is a song written and performed by Nicaraguan salsa singer Luis Enrique on his 1994 self-titled studio album of the same name. It was released as the first single from the album in 1994. "Quién Eres Tú" was the first number-one song on Billboard's Tropical Airplay upon the chart's debut on the week of 8 October 1994. It was recognized as the best-performing songs of the year at the 1995 ASCAP Latin Awards.

== Charts ==
Chart (1994)	Peak position
US Hot Latin Songs (Billboard)	7
US Tropical Airplay (Billboard)	1

== See also ==
- List of Billboard Tropical Airplay number ones of 1994 and 1995
