= Rey Ruiz =

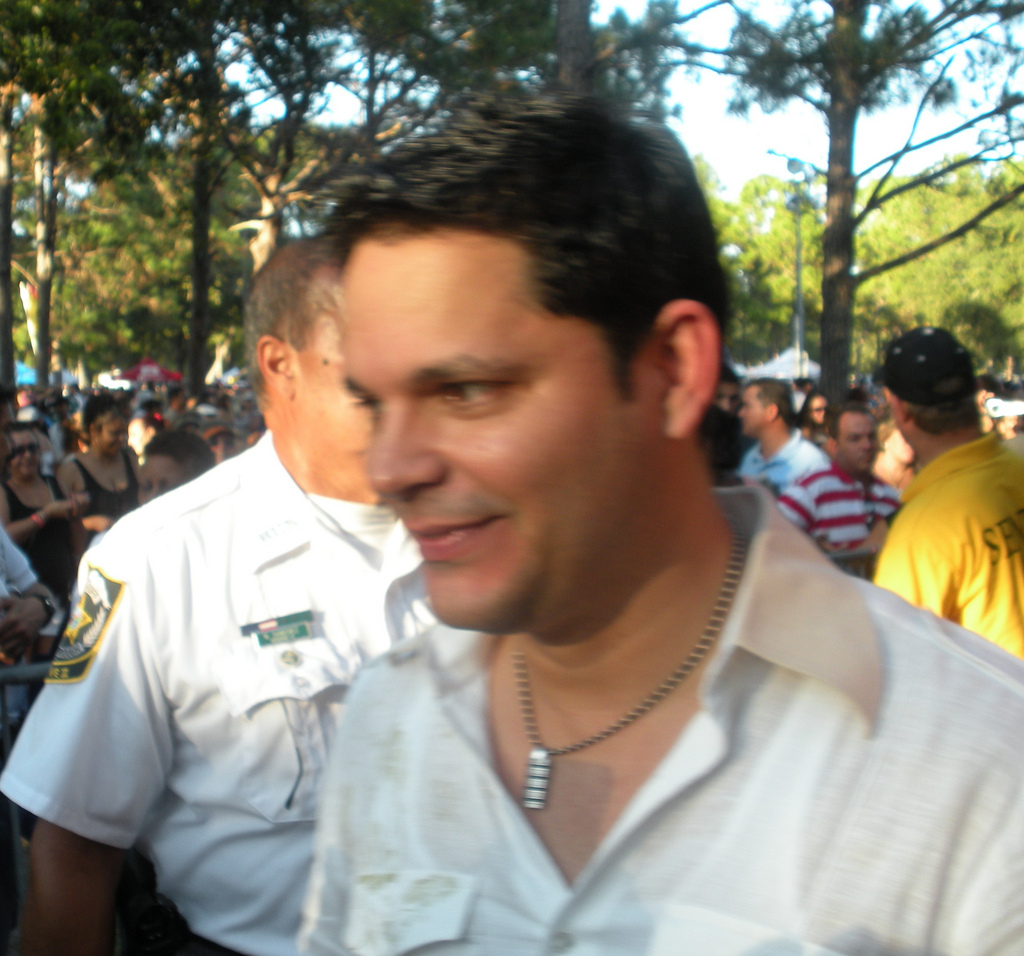

Background information
- Born: Reinerio Ruiz Santiago; June 21, 1966 (age 60); La Lisa, Havana, Cuba
- Genre: Salsa
- Occupations: Singer-Songwriter
- Years active: 1992–present

Rey Ruiz (Reinerio Ruiz born June 21, 1966 in La Lisa, Havana, Cuba) is a salsa singer from Cuba. Ruiz reached international fame across Latin America, Europe and among Hispanic music fans in the United States.

== Biography ==
Rey Ruiz demonstrated a lot of interest in becoming a salsa singer since he was a small child. Aside from an apparently normal childhood, Ruiz made his debut as a performer at a very young age; he was often showcased on Cuban television as a child, singing typical children's songs. Ruiz had his parents' full support, he was later on enrolled in Havana's Conservatorio de Música school. Eventually, Ruiz made his way to headlining a show at the Habana Libre Hotel.

Rey Ruiz performed in the well known "Cabaret Tropicana" music group. During a Cabaret Tropicana tour in the Dominican Republic, Ruiz defected, leaving the group to join some friends in the United States, later stating that a strong motivator for leaving Cuba was his desire for "money and democracy."

It took Ruiz three years after he arrived in the United States for him to release his first CD, and begin to gain fame as a solo salsa singer. The self-titled "Rey Ruiz" was produced by Sony Records and it earned Ruiz celebrity in such places as Puerto Rico, the Dominican Republic, Panama and Venezuela. The album also earned Ruiz a number of Billboard and Premios Lo Nuestro awards (including Tropical New Artist of the Year), and it was a platinum album. Rey Ruiz was named the "salsa singer of the year" for 1993 by a prestigious salsa music magazine and was known for hits such as "No Me Acostumbro" and "Amiga".

Ruiz's initial success as a singer translated into small screen success as well, as he was hired by Pepsi, Miller beer and his studio company, Sony, to film commercials announcing their brand. Ruiz's second album was a various artists' compilation dedicated to salsa singers from the 1960s and 1970s. The tribute album was named "Los Soneros de Hoy". loosely translated into "Today's (salsa) performers".

Also in 1993, Ruiz released his second album. "Mi Media Mitad" ("My Other Half") was a large hit in the United States and in Europe, once again, making the Billboard hits list in the States, and topping the European charts. "Mi Media Mitad" became Ruiz's second consecutive platinum album, and it helped make Ruiz popular in Colombia as well, with a single, "Si te Preguntan" ("If They Ask You") becoming a major hit song. Soon after that album's release, Ruiz made his debut at New York's Madison Square Garden. The same year, Ruiz earned the New Tropical/Salsa Artist of the Year award at the Lo Nuestro Awards.

Ruiz's third album, "En Cuerpo y Alma" ("Body and Soul"), was released in 1995. This was Ruiz's third platinum album in a row; his songs "Estamos Solos" ("We Are Alone") and "Vuelve de Nuevo Conmigo" ("Return Once Again With Me") were international hits, and many salsa experts consider this album to be Ruiz's most important release.

In 1996, with the collaboration of famed Colombian songwriter Omar Estefano and of Ricardo Quijano, Ruiz released his fourth consecutive platinum album, named "Destino" ("Destiny"). One of the most publicly acclaimed songs in that album was "Miénteme Otra Vez" ("Lie to me Again").

His next album, 1997's "Porque es Amor' ("Because it is Love") failed to have the commercial success Ruiz's four previous releases had, ending Ruiz's streak of platinum albums at four. It did, however, contain three major hit songs, including the title song, as well as "Mi Angel" ("My Angel") and "Tú no Sabes" ("You Don't Know").

In 1998, Ruiz released a greatest hits CD, named "Exitos del Rey" ("Rey's Hits", a name which can also be interpreted as "The King's hits", since Rey means king in Spanish). By then, Ruiz owned a recording company; his next album, "Ya Ves Quien Soy" ("Now You See Who I Am"), becoming one of the first CDs to be released by Ruiz's Luna Negra ("Dark Moon") record label. In that year, Sony U.S. Latin, released a compilation called "Salsa de Titanes" which included Rey Ruiz' single "Piano" featuring famous pianist Paquito Hechavarría.

"Ya Ves Quien Soy" was another commercial success for Ruiz, particularly in Brazil. Ruiz collaborated with Brazilian singer José Augusto in this album, when the pair recorded a duet song, "Siempre Mía" ("Always Mine").

In 2000, Ruiz joined the Bohemia Records label, releasing "Fenomenal" ("Phenomenal") under that label. In 2004, he released the album Mi Tentacion ("My Temptation"), that included the top hit "Creo en el Amor" ("I Believe in Love"), which was nominated for "Best Tropical Song" at the Latin Grammy Awards.

In 2008 Ruiz fulfilled a lifetime dream by performing on stage with some of his closest musical colleagues at the Adrian Arsht Center for the Performing Arts in Miami. Along with Grammy Winner Arturo Sandoval, Marlon (the winner of Objetivo Fama), and "Los Tres de La Habana", this musical collaboration was recorded for a soon to be released DVD. Ruiz signed on to a new recording contract which brought him back to his original label Sony/BMG with a highly anticipated album being produced by Cuco Pena, one of Puerto Rico's premier musical producers.

On June 7, 2024, renowned salsa artist Rey Ruiz released his single "La Guerra Acaba," marking a significant return to the music scene. This track showcases Ruiz's signature salsa rhythms, blending traditional elements with contemporary sounds to captivate both long-time fans and new listeners. In an exclusive interview, Ruiz discussed the inspiration behind "La Guerra Acaba," emphasizing its themes of love and resilience. The single is available on major streaming platforms

== See also ==
List of Cubans
