= Johnny Rivera =

American singer

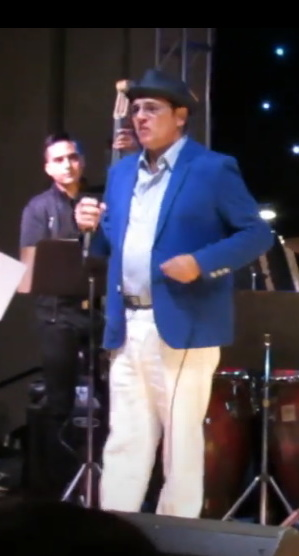
Johnnyrivera

Johnny Rivera is an American salsa singer of Puerto Rican descent.

Rivera was born in the Bronx, NY, and attended high school at Benjamin Franklin High School. He moved briefly to Puerto Rico before returning to New York City to begin a career in music. His first album was released in 1991, and since then he has scored fifteen hit singles, including the Billboard Latin Tropical #1 "Se Parecia Tanto a Ti" (1995). Rivera was nominated for Tropical New Artist of the Year at the 1994 Lo Nuestro Awards.

On June 11, 2020, Johnny Rivera was the featured singer on Norberto Vélez's YouTube channel titled "Sesiones Desde La Loma Ep. 9".

== Discography ==
- Tiburón with Grupo Fascinación (Rico Records, 198?)
- Salsa Vice with Grupo Fascinación (Rico Records, 1986)
- Clásico 88 with Conjunto Clasico (Lo Mejor, 1988)
- Más Clásico Que Nunca with Conjunto Clasico (Lo Mejor, 1989)
- Y Ahora de Verdad Sony Records, RMM Records, 1991)
- Encuentro Casual (Sony, RMM Records, 1992)
- Cuando Parará la Lluvia (RMM Records, 1993)
- Déjame Intentarlo (RMM Records, 1995)
- Paisajes de la Vida (RMM Records, 1996)
- Un Estilo Propio (RMM Records, 1998)
- Estoy Aquí (RMM Records, 2000)
- Palladium Series Live (RMM Records, 2001)
- Vivo Por Ti (Coalition Music, Universal Music Group, 2007)
- El Noble de la Salsa (Universal Music Group, 2011)

== Compilations ==
- Los Maestros de la Salsa (RMM Records, 1996)
- Serie Cristal: Greatest Hits (RMM Records, 1997)
- Serie 32 (2002)
- Pura Salsa (2006)
