= Billboard tropical charts =

The Billboard tropical charts began in 1985 when an album chart were introduced as Tropical Albums in the June 29 issue of the magazine. In October 1994, Billboard then established Tropical Airplay, which initially rank the most-played songs played on tropical radio stations before switching to an audience-based methodology in January 2017. As the music and radio industries, as well as the technology to monitor and measure sales and airplay, have evolved, Billboard currently publishes three different tropical charts. On April 8, 2025, Billboard debuted the Hot Tropical Songs chart, which ranks the best-performing tropical songs across streaming, digital, and airplay from all radio stations in the United States.

According to Billboard, tropical music refers to music originating from the Spanish-speaking areas of the Caribbean, namely salsa, merengue, bachata, cumbia, and vallenato.

== History ==
=== Tropical Albums ===
The Tropical Albums chart was established on the issue dated June 29, 1985. Initially, it was published on a fortnightly basis with its positions being compiled by sales data from Latin retailers and distributors. The methodology for the chart was amended with the effect from the week of July 10, 1993, to have its sales compiled by Nielsen SoundScan, basing it on electronic point of sale data. At the same time, the chart began to be published weekly and became a sub chart of Top Latin Albums (which was established in the same week as the methodology change). Billboard also imposed a linguistic rule requiring an album to have 70% of its content in Spanish (later reduced to 50%) to be eligible to rank on the chart. On January 26, 2017, Billboard updated the Tropical Albums, along with the other genre album charts, to incorporate track equivalent albums (TEA) and streaming equivalent albums (SEA) to match the current Billboard 200 methodology.

The first number-one album on the Tropical Albums chart was Innovations by El Gran Combo de Puerto Rico.

=== Tropical Airplay ===
The Tropical Airplay was established on October 8, 1994, as a subchart of the Latin Airplay chart. It ranked the top-performing songs played on tropical radio stations in the US based on weekly airplay data compiled by Nielsen's Broadcast Data Systems (BDS). With the issue dated January 21, 2017, Billboard revamped the chart to reflect overall airplay of tropical music on Latin radio stations. Instead of ranking songs being played on tropical stations, rankings are determined by the amount of airplay tropical songs receive on stations that play Latin music regardless of genre.

The first number-one song on the Tropical Airplay chart was "Quien Eres Tu" by Luis Enrique.

=== Hot Tropical Songs ===
On the issue dated April 12, 2025, Billboard established Hot Tropical Songs which ranks the best-performing tropical songs which follows the methodology of the Billboard Hot 100 by incorporating digital download sales, streaming data, and radio airplay of tropical songs over all formats. The first number-one song on the Hot Tropical Songs chart was "Baile Inolvidable" by Bad Bunny.
