= 1998 in Latin music =

This is a list of notable events in Latin music (i.e. music from the Spanish- and Portuguese-speaking areas Latin America, Europe, and the United States) that took place in 1998.

== Events ==
- February 25 – The 40th Annual Grammy Awards are held at the Radio City Music Hall in New York City. This is the first award ceremony where members of the Latin Academy of Recording Arts & Sciences (LARAS) are eligible to vote in the Latin field of the Grammy Award categories. In addition, a new category for Latin rock and alternative music was established.
  - Luis Miguel wins the Grammy Award for Best Latin Pop Performance for his album Romances.
  - Ry Cooder wins the Grammy Award for Best Tropical Latin Performance for his production of Buena Vista Social Club.
  - La Mafia wins the Grammy Award for Best Mexican-American/Tejano Music Performance for their album En Tus Besos.
  - Los Fabulosos Cadillacs wins the Best Latin Rock/Alternative Performance for their album Fabulosos Calavera.
  - Roy Hargrove's band Crisol wins the Grammy Award for Best Latin Jazz Performance for their album Habana.
- April 5 — The 9th Annual Billboard Latin Music Conference is held at the Biscayne Bay Marriott hotel.
  - The 5th Billboard Latin Music Awards are also held in the same week. Marc Anthony is the only artist with multiple wins with two awards. Mexican singer Vicente Fernández is inducted into the Billboard Latin Music of Fame.
- May 14 — The 10th Annual Lo Nuestro Awards are held at the James L. Knight Center in Miami, Florida. Alejandro Fernández is the biggest winner with five awards.

October 10–17 – Due to damage to the Broadcast Data Systems monitors in Puerto Rico caused by Hurricane Georges, no charts for the Hot Latin Songs are published by Billboard.

== Bands disbanded ==
- Mazz

== Number-ones albums and singles by country ==
- List of number-one albums of 1998 (Spain)
- List of number-one singles of 1998 (Spain)
- List of number-one Billboard Top Latin Albums of 1998
- List of number-one Billboard Hot Latin Tracks of 1998

== Awards ==
- 1998 Premio Lo Nuestro
- 1998 Billboard Latin Music Awards
- 1998 Tejano Music Awards

== Albums released ==
=== First quarter ===
==== January ====
Day	Title	Artist	Genre(s)	Singles	Label
13	Celebrando 25 Años de Juan Gabriel: En Concierto en el Palacio de Bellas Artes	Juan Gabriel	Ballad, bolero, flamenco, mariachi, ranchera	"Así Fue" "Amor Eterno" "Te Sigo Amando" "Costumbres"	Ariola, BMG U.S. Latin
27	Como Te Recuerdo	Los Temerarios			Fonovisa Records
27	Tracción Acústica	Enanitos Verdes	Pop rock		Rodven
27	Hasta la Eternidad	Los Acosta	Conjunto		Disa

==== February ====
Day	Title	Artist	Genre(s)	Singles	Label
3	Sol	Los Tiranos del Norte			
3	Prefiero el Futbol	El Morro			FonoVisa
3	Toda Mi Vida	Jay Perez	Tejano		Sony Discos
10	Los Primera	Servando & Florentino	Salsa	"Una Fan Enamorada" "Los Hermanos Primera" "Aliviame"	WEA Latina
12	Vuelve	Ricky Martin	Merengue, boogaloo, bolero, soft rock, ballad		Sony Discos
24	Cerca de ti	Lucero	Ranchera		Universal
24	Hoy Quiero Cantanrte	Tony Vega			

==== March ====
Day	Title	Artist	Genre(s)	Singles	Label
10	Desde el Corazon de Texas	La Tropa F	Tejano, conjunto, cumbia		EMI Latin, In The House Productions Inc.
10	Como Pez en el Agua	Grupo Mojado	Cumbia		FonoVisa
17	Aires de Mi Norte	Los Huracanes del Norte			
24	Ana José Nacho	Mecano	Chanson, synth-pop		BMG U.S. Latin, Ariola
24	Instantes	Patricia Navidad	Mariachi		Melody
24	The New Sound of the Venezuelan Gozadera	Los Amigos Invisibles	Bossa nova, Latin jazz, jazz-funk, disco	"Ultra-Funk" "Groupie" "Cha-Chaborro"	Luaka Bop, Warner Bros. Records
24	Dale Cara a la Vida	Tito Nieves	Salsa		RMM Records
24	Estos Si Son Corridazos	Los Originales de San Juan		"El Rey del Cristal" "Los Cuatro de Michoacán" "100 Kilos de Reina"	
31	Confesiones de Amor	Los Ángeles Azules	Cumbia		Disa, EMI Latin
31	Róbame un Beso	Graciela Beltrán	Tejano	"Róbame un Beso"	EMI Latin
31	A Gozar Con Sabrosura	Fito Olivares			EMI Latin
31	A Pasito Lento!	Los Toros Band			Rodven

=== Second quarter ===
==== April ====
Day	Title	Artist	Genre(s)	Singles	Label
14	Suavemente	Elvis Crespo	Hip-house, merengue	"Suavemente" "Luna Llena" "Tu Sonrisa"	Sony Discos
14	Vida Loca	Francisco Céspedes	Ballad		Wea Latina, Inc.
14	Entrega Total	OV7			
14	Te Seguire	Los Palominos	Tejano	"Te Seguiré" "Cuando Tu Me Quieras" "Quiero Ser"	Sony
14	¿Por Qué Dismular?	Jeans			
21	Todo el Amor	Myriam Hernández	Ballad, romantic, vocal		Sony
28	Es Mi Tiempo	Manny Manuel	Salsa, merengue	"Como Duele" "Corazón Partído" "Desvelo de Amor"	Merengazo Records

==== May ====
Day	Title	Artist	Genre(s)	Singles	Label
4	Arena en los Bolsillos	Manolo García	Folk rock, acoustic, pop rock		BMG U.S. Latin
12	Ironias	Víctor Manuelle	Salsa	"Se Me Rompe el Alma" "Qué Habría Sido de Mí" "La Dueña de Mis Amores"	Sony Discos
19	Carlos Ponce	Carlos Ponce	Ballad, soft rock, tribal house		Capitol/EMI Latin
19	Juntos (1998)	Sergio Vargas and Gisselle			
19	Hot House	Arturo Sandoval	Big Band	"Rhythm of Our World" "Sandunga"	N2K Encoded Music
19	Obsesión	David Sánchez	Latin jazz, contemporary jazz, easy listening		Columbia
19	No Mas Contigo	Ezequiel Peña			
26	Sin Documentos	Los Rodríguez	Pop rock		GASA
26	Un Segundo Sentimiento	Charlie Zaa	Ballad, bolero		Sony Discos, Sonolux
28	Um sonhador	Leandro e Leonardo	Country		RCA
29	Sin Daños a Terceros	Ricardo Arjona	Acoustic, soft rock, pop rock	"Mentiroso" "Desnuda" "Dime Que No"	Sony

==== June ====
Day	Title	Artist	Genre(s)	Singles	Label
2	Enemigos íntimos	Fito Páez and Joaquín Sabina	Soft rock, pop rock		BMG U.S. Latin, Ariola
2	Lagrimas de Sangre	Banda Maguey	Ranchera		RCA, BMG Entertainment Mexico, S.A. De C.V.
2	Gargolas 1: El Comando Ataca	Alex Gargolas	Reggaeton		VI Music
15	Equilíbrio Distante	Renato Russo	Acoustic		EMI, EMI
15	O Último Solo	Renato Russo	Vocal, pop rock		EMI, EMI
16	La Llorona	Lhasa de Sela	Neofolk		Atlantic
16	Ozomatli	Ozomatli	Latin	"Cut Chemist Suite" "Cumbia de los Muertos" "Chango"	Almo Sounds
16	Intocable	Intocable	Tejano	"Amor Maltido" "Perdedor" "Huracán"	EMI Latin
16	Un Regalo de Amor	Liberación	Cumbia, ballad, norteno, ranchera		Disa
16	Hey Na Na	Os Paralamas do Sucesso	Pop rock		EMI, EMI
16	Antes de Partir	La Arrolladora Banda El Limón			
16	Mais do Mesmo	Legião Urbana	Pop rock		EMI
30	Amor Platónico	Los Tucanes de Tijuana	Cumbia, merengue, ranchera, ballad, bolero	"Espejeando" "La Traigo Muerta"	EMI Latin
30	Entre el Amor y Yo	Vicente Fernández	Ranchera		Sony
30	Viento a Favor	Sentidos Opuestos	Europop, dance-pop		EMI Latin
30	No Lo Voy a Olvidar	Brenda K. Starr	Salsa	"Hombre Mío, Hombre Ajeno" "No lo Voy a Olvidar"	Parcha Records, Platano Records
30	Aquamosh	Plastilina Mosh	Acid jazz, electro, big beat	"Niño Bomba" "Encendedor" "Aquamosh"	Capitol Records
30	Caribe Atómico	Aterciopelados	New wave, pop rock, post-rock	"Caribe Atómico" "El Estuche" "Maligno"	BMG
30	Lo Mas Romantico de Ayer Con Los...	Guardianes del Amor	Cumbia, ballad		RCA, BMG U.S. Latin
30	Distancia	José José	Ballad		BMG U.S. Latin, Ariola
30	Frente a Mi	Edith Márquez	Ballad		WEA

=== Third quarter ===
==== July ====
Day	Title	Artist	Genre(s)	Singles	Label
1	Violencia Musical	Hector y Tito	Reggaeton		VI Music
21	Esperanto	Kabah	Euro house, synth-pop		Rodven
28	Por Mujeres Como Tu	Pepe Aguilar	Mariachi		Musart, Musart
28	A Caballo	Kinito Méndez	Merengue		J&N Records, Sony

==== August ====
Day	Title	Artist	Genre(s)	Singles	Label
4	Todo Por Ti	Priscila y Sus Balas de Plata	Ballad, cumbia, norteno, ranchera		FonoVisa
11	Dancemania '99: Live at Birdland	Tito Puente	Salsa, mambo		RMM Records
13	Dance with Me: Music from the Motion Picture	Various artists	Soundtrack, salsa, cha-cha, hip-house, Latin, merengue, samba, dance-pop		Epic, Sony Discos, Sony Music Soundtrax
18	Exclusivo	Toño Rosario	Merengue, bachata		WEACaribe, Wea Latina, Inc.
25	Nacimiento y Recuerdo	Frankie Ruiz	Salsa		Rodven
25	Señor Bolero	José Feliciano	Bolero		PolyGram
25	El Rumbero del Piano	Eddie Palmieri	Afro-Cuban jazz, salsa, plena, Latin jazz	"Cafe"	RMM Records
25	Un Juego de Amor	Grupo Bryndis	Cumbia		Disa
25	Por Amor	Plácido Domingo	Romantic, vocal, ballad		WEA

==== September ====
Day	Title	Artist	Genre(s)	Singles	Label
1	...En la Plaza de Toros México	Ana Gabriel	Vocal		Sony, Sony
1	Vive	Milly Quezada	Merengue, bachata		Sony Tropical
1	Euforia	La Mafia	Tejano		Sony
8	Central Avenue	Danilo Pérez	Afro-Cuban jazz, Latin jazz	"Blues for the Saints" "Lush Life"	Impulse!
8	Amor del Bueno	Banda Arkángel R-15	Ranchera		Luna Music
8	En Vivo: Desde Monterrey Mexico	Bobby Pulido	Tejano		EMI Latin
8	Tengo Una Ilusion	Banda el Recodo	Ranchera		FonoVisa, FonoVisa
15	Desde Mexico	Raúl di Blasio	Latin jazz		BMG Venezuela, Ariola
15	Comenzaré	Luis Fonsi		"Si Tu Quisieras" "Perdoname" "Dime Como" "Me Ire"	Universal
15	Lo Mejor de la Vida	Compay Segundo	Afro-Cuban, Cubano, Latin jazz		Nonesuch
15	Los Super Seven	Los Super Seven		"Deportee (Plane Wreck at Los Gatos)" "La Madrugada (The Dawn)"	BMG Entertainment, RCA
15	Reencarnacion	¡Cubanismo!	Afro-Cuban jazz, mambo, son, descarga		Hannibal Records
15	Sombras de la China	Joan Manuel Serrat	Vocal		BMG U.S. Latin
18	Tu Ya Lo Conoces	Julio Preciado y su Banda del Pacifico			
22	Todo o Nada	Lucía Méndez	Bolero, ballad		Azteca Music
22	El Privilegio de Amar	Manuel Mijares	Ballad		Rodven
22	Cosas del Amor	Enrique Iglesias	Latin pop, ballad	"Nunca Te Olvidaré" "Esperanza" "Para de Jugar"	FonoVisa
22	Mi Vida Es Cantar	Celia Cruz	Salsa, Afro-Cuban		RMM Records
22	Fin de Siglo	El Tri	Blues rock		WEA
22	Cuantas Veces	Mazz	Tejano, ranchera, cumbia, conjunto		EMI Latin
22	Ven a Mi Mundo	Los Mismos			EMI Latin
29	Dónde Están los Ladrones?	Shakira	Pop rock, vocal, Latin pop	"Ciega, Sordomuda" "Si Te Vas" "No Creo" "Ojos Así"	Sony
29	No Me Compares	Frankie Negrón	Salsa		WEA Latina, Inc.
29	Afro-Cuban Fantasy	Poncho Sanchez	Latin jazz	"Subway Harry" "Afro-Cuban Fantasy"	Concord Picante
29	Atado a Tu Amor	Chayanne	Salsa, ballad		Sony Latin, Sony Latin, Sony Latin

=== Fourth quarter ===
==== October ====
Day	Title	Artist	Genre(s)	Singles	Label
6	Bloque	Bloque			Warner Bros. Records, Luaka Bop
13	Yo Voy Por Ti	Karis	Merengue		EMD Music Inc.
20	Mi respuesta	Laura Pausini	Ballad, soft rock, vocal		CGD East West, Wea Latina, Inc.
20	De Corazón a Corazón	Grupo Límite	Tejano, norteno		PolyGram Discos, S.A. De C.V.
27	Te Acordarás de Mí	Olga Tañón		"Tu Amor" "Escondidos" "Hielo y Fuego" "El Niño"	Wea Latina, Inc.
27	En la Mira	Ilegales	Merengue, Latin, hip-house		BMG U.S. Latin, Ariola
27	The Album II	Alabina	Flamenco, Cubano	"Ya Mama Ya Mama" "Lolole (Don't Let Me Be Misunderstood)"	Astor Place
27	Exitos en Vivo	Banda Maguey	Cumbia, ranchera, bolero		BMG U.S. Latin, RCA
30	Big Band Ríos	Miguel Ríos	Rock & roll		Rock & Rios Discos, Bat Discos, Azteca Music

==== November ====
Day	Title	Artist	Genre(s)	Singles	Label
3	De Otra Manera	Jerry Rivera			Sony
3	El Color de los Sueños	Fey	Euro house, synth-pop		Sony Latin, Sony Latin
3	Puro Pueblo	Michael Salgado	Tejano		Sony, Discos Joey International
3	Ayer, Hoy Y Siempre...Con Amor	Los Trios			
3	Mariposa	Jennifer y Los Jetz	Tejano	"Tengo Miedo"	EMI Latin
10	Atada	Gisselle	Merengue, ballad	"Atada" "Dame un Beso" "No Es Cuestion de Sexo"	BMG U.S. Latin, Ariola
10	The Dynasty	Grupo Manía	Merengue	"Como Baila" "Niña Bonita" "Voy a Ganar Su Amor" "Magia"	Sony Discos Inc.
10	Al Despertar	Mercedes Sosa			Mercury
10	Livro	Caetano Veloso	MPB	"Manhata (Para Lulu Santos) (For Lulu Santos)" "Doideca" "Não Enche"	Nonesuch
10	All Star	Los Rabanes	Ska		Kiwi Records, BMG U.S. Latin
17	Aventurero	Pedro Fernández	Mariachi		Rodven, PolyGram
17	Con los Pies Sobre la Tierra	Melina León	Merengue		Sony Discos, Tropix Music Records
17	Los Más Buscados	Los Tucanes de Tijuana	Norteno		EMI
17	Luna nueva	Rosana	Vocal		Universal
24	Superfantástico	Tatiana			Rodven
24	Acústico MTV	Rita Lee	MPB		Mercury, PolyGram

==== December ====
Day	Title	Artist	Genre(s)	Singles	Label
1	Pollomania	Ivonne Avilez			EMI Latin
1	Aquel Que Había Muerto	Vico C	Reggaeton	"Aquel Que Había Muerto" "Calla"	EMI Latin
1	Pasaporte Musical	El Gran Combo de Puerto Rico			
8	Con la Banda...El Recodo	Juan Gabriel and Banda el Recodo			
15	Ni Es Lo Mismo Ni Es Igual	Juan Luis Guerra & 4.40	Merengue, salsa, bachata		Karen Records
15	Vuela Más Alto	OV7			
15	The Original Rude Girl	Ivy Queen	Reggaeton		Sony Discos
30	Enrique Iglesias	Enrique Iglesias	Ballad, soft rock		FonoVisa, Mercury, FonoVisa, Mercury

=== Unknown ===
Title	Artist	Genre(s)	Singles	Label
Imitação da vida	Maria Bethânia	MPB		EMI, EMI
Necesito Decirte	Conjunto Primavera	Cumbia, norteno		FonoVisa
Bele Bele En La Habana	Chucho Valdés	Afro-Cuban jazz, bolero, Afro-Cuban, Latin jazz		Blue Note
Clandestino	Manu Chao	Folk rock, reggae, downtempo, leftfield	"Bongo Bong" "Mentira..." "Mama Call"	Ark 21 Records
A Quien Pueda Interesar	Fiel a la Vega	Latin, pop rock		Joripatipe
Cuidadito	Michael Salgado	Tejano		Discos Joey International
A mi gente	Soledad Pastorutti	Folk		Columbia, Sony Music
Depende	Jarabe de Palo	Pop rock		EMI Latin
Reencuentro	Joe Veras	Bachata		Guitarra Records

== Best-selling records ==
=== Best-selling albums ===
The following is a list of the top 10 best-selling Latin albums in the United States in 1998, according to Billboard.

Rank	Album	Artist
1	Me Estoy Enamorando	Alejandro Fernández
2	Vuelve	Ricky Martin
3	Buena Vista Social Club	Buena Vista Social Club
4	Contra la Corriente	Marc Anthony
5	Sueños Líquidos	Maná
6	Romances	Luis Miguel
7	Dance with Me: Music from the Motion Picture	Various artists
8	Suavemente	Elvis Crespo
9	Sentimientos	Charlie Zaa
10	Más	Alejandro Sanz

=== Best-performing songs ===
The following is a list of the top 10 best-performing Latin songs in the United States in 1998, according to Billboard.

Rank	Single	Artist
1	"Así Fue"	Juan Gabriel
2	"Si Tú Supieras"	Alejandro Fernández
3	"A Pesar de Todos"	Ana Gabriel
4	"Vuelve"	Ricky Martin
5	"Por Mujeres Como Tú"	Pepe Aguilar
6	"No Sé Olvidar"	Alejandro Fernández
7	"Yo Nací Para Amarte"	Alejandro Fernández
8	"En El Jardín"	Alejandro Fernández featuring Gloria Estefan
9	"Por Qué Te Conocí"	Los Temerarios
10	"Suavemente"	Elvis Crespo

== Births ==
- January 2 – Christell, Chilean singer
- April 12 – Paulo Londra, Argentine trap singer
- May 29 – Lucía Gil, Spanish singer and actress
- July 18 – Luísa Sonza, Brazilian pop singer
- August 25 – Abraham Mateo, Spanish pop singer

== Deaths ==
- January 22 – Anselmo Sacasas, Cuban jazz pianist and bandleader, 85
- March 15 – Tim Maia, Brazilian MPB singer, 55
- April 18 – Nelson Gonçalves, Brazilian samba singer and songwriter, 79
- June 23 – Leandro, Brazilian sertanejo singer of sibling duo Leandro e Leonardo
- August 4 – Carmen Delia Dipini, Puerto Rican bolero singer
- August 9 – Frankie Ruiz, Puerto Rican salsa singer
