= Suavemente =

1998 studio album by Elvis Crespo

Studio album by Elvis Crespo
- Released: April 14, 1998
- Studio: AQ-30 Studio (Bayamón)
- Genre: Merengue
- Length: 41:38
- Language: Spanish
- Label: Sony Discos
- Producers: Elvis Crespo; Luis A. Cruz; Roberto Cora; Papo Ríos

Elvis Crespo chronology
Suavemente (1998)	Píntame (1999)

Singles from Suavemente
- 1. "Suavemente" Released: April 4, 1998; 2. "Tu Sonrisa" Released: July 1998; 3. "Luna Llena" Released: November 1998; 4. "Nuestra Canción" Released: 1999

Suavemente (English: Smoothly) is the debut studio album by American merenguero recording artist Elvis Crespo. Released by Sony Music Latin on April 14, 1998, the album established Crespo as a leading artist in the Latin music market. He collaborated with several songwriters and record producers to create an overall tropical music-flavored recording.

With romantic ballads and uptempo songs, Suavemente received favorable reviews from music critics who found the recording to contain energetic and catchy tracks. The album was commercially successful; it became the first merengue recording to peak at number one on the United States Billboard Top Latin Albums chart. Suavemente peaked at number 106 on the U.S. Billboard 200 chart. Two of its singles, "Suavemente" and "Tu Sonrisa", topped the U.S. Billboard Hot Latin Songs chart; Crespo was recognized as becoming the first artist to have placed two merengue singles at number one. Suavemente was Crespo's commercial breakthrough, introducing him to the popular music market with the Spanglish remix of its title track.

The album received several accolades, including Billboard Latin Music Awards for Album of the Year and New Artist Album of the Year and a nomination for the Grammy Award for Best Tropical Performance. It won five Lo Nuestro Awards, including Tropical Album of the Year. The recording has been certified platinum by the Recording Industry Association of America (RIAA), and has sold more than 4 million copies worldwide. Its title song remains a staple at Latin music nightclubs and festivals, while Suavemente has been ranked among the most essential Latin albums of the past 50 years by Billboard magazine.

== Background ==
In 1993, brothers Héctor and Oscar Serrano formed Grupo Manía in Puerto Rico. They enlisted Alfred Cotto, Reynaldo Santiago, and Elvis Crespo to tour and record two-step merengue music, popularizing the genre to a younger audience. In 1996, Crespo left Grupo Manía and signed with Sony Music Latin (the company which signed his former band), beginning his solo career. He said in a May 1999 Billboard interview that leaving the band was "a very hard decision", since they worked well together. Crespo originally intended for "Suavemente" and "Tu Sonrisa", the singles which brought him international recognition, to be recorded with Grupo Manía.

== Release and promotion ==
The album was released in the United States on April 14, 1998. Suavemente and American merengue singer Manny Manuel's album, Es Mi Tiempo, increased U.S. tropical-music sales by 27 percent over the previous year. On November 28, the Recording Industry Association of America (RIAA) certified Suavemente gold for shipments of 500,000 copies, the first merengue record certified gold. The album was certified gold in Chile, platinum in Venezuela, and platinum in Central America. During the 1998 Christmas season, Suavemente was among the top-selling Latin albums in the United States. On February 20, 1999, Sony Discos president Oscar Llord expressed an interest in promoting Suavemente in Latin America and Europe since he believed that the album would sell over one million copies. In May, it sold 1,500,000 copies worldwide. As of October 2017 Suavemente has sold over 879,000 copies in the United States, making it the 11th bestselling Latin album in the country according to Nielsen SoundScan. Worldwide, it had sold more than 4 million of copies.

Crespo performed at the 23rd New York Salsa Festival at Madison Square Garden on September 5, 1998, with El Gran Combo de Puerto Rico, and Latin jazz recording artist Eddie Palmieri. He was part of the Hot Latin Nights show at Walt Disney World's Pleasure Island on September 19, which was broadcast as a two-part Telemundo special on December 14 and 31. On October 11 Crespo (performing with other Latin acts) sang "Suavemente" on the seven-hour Puerto Rico Se Levanta, a benefit concert broadcast live on Telemundo which raised $13 million for victims of Hurricane Georges on Hispaniola. He performed "Suavemente" at the 1999 Billboard Latin Music Awards. Crespo's appearance was praised by Billboard's John Lannert, who believed that it foreshadowed possible dominance at future music awards. He appeared at El Concierto Del Amor, an annual tropical-music festival held at the Continental Airlines Arena in East Rutherford, New Jersey, on February 14, 1999, with fellow salsa singers Jerry Rivera, Frankie Negron, Tito Nieves, and Michael Stuart. To promote Suavemente Crespo toured Uruguay, Argentina, Chile, Colombia, and Peru in the first quarter of the year, and he performed at Billboard's 10th annual Latin Music conference on April 20, 1999.

== Reception ==
Professional ratings
Review scores
Source	Rating
AllMusic	4/5 stars

In Billboard, Latin music contributor John Lannert called the album a "merengue-bomba disc" and Crespo a "midtempo pop/merengue" artist. In his 2003 book, The Latin Beat, Ed Morales described the title song as a "salsa classic or pop hit." True crime novelist M. William Phelps called "Suavemente" a "romantic Latin ballad" in his 2008 book, I'll Be Watching You. In her 2005 book, Pop Culture Latin America, Lisa Shaw called "Suavemente" "an example of some of the best merengue with a rock-pop sound." According to Batanga magazine, Suavemente is "intoxicating, feverish, pure sabroso merengue. Sizzle in the summer streets to the fast-paced beats, ear busting horns and percussive stamina"; Latina magazine noted the album's "feverish beat". Spanish-language magazine Vistazo called Crespo the new sensation of merengue music, and his album a favorite of listeners who enjoy pachanga.

Sony Music International Latin America president Frank Welzer called Crespo a "genius" who wrote "catchy fan-pleasing" songs. Terry Jenkins of AllMusic praised the album's "seductive Latin ballads" and found the focal mode of the recording to be sentimental, strong, lively, and swinging. Business Wire noted its popularity in the American and Latino markets. The Los Angeles Times called Suavemente and Crespo's repertoire "energy-packed". Billboard's Lannert wrote that other Latin acts tried to emulate Crespo's style.

== Chart history ==
Suavemente debuted at number six on the U.S. Billboard Top Latin Albums chart for the week ending May 2, 1998. In its second week the album rose to number five, selling 3,000 copies. Suavemente was number three on the chart for the week ending May 16, selling 5,000 copies (a 60-percent increase). The following week the album rose to number two, behind Selena's Anthology box set, and sold 7,000 copies. The sales increase placed Suavemente at number 188 on the U.S. Billboard 200 chart, only the second merengue album to make that chart. In its fifth week, album sales fell 50 percent and it dropped to number eight. The following week (which included the Memorial Day weekend), Suavemente moved up to number six. For the week ending June 13, the album re-entered the Billboard 200 chart at number 170 and peaked at number one on the Top Latin Albums chart. The next week it dropped to number three and 197 on the Top Latin Albums and Billboard 200 charts, respectively. Suavemente sold 6,000 copies for the week ending June 13, rising to number two on the Top Latin Albums chart behind Ricky Martin's Vuelve. The album dropped to third the following week. Suavemente sold 6,000 copies the next week, rising to number two behind Vuelve. After five weeks behind Vuelve, Suavemente passed it on the Top Latin Albums chart when its sales increased 16 percent to 8,600 copies. For the week of August 8, 1998, it fell back to number two behind Vuelve. After three weeks of declining sales, Suavemente was number three when it sold 5,000 copies as "Tu Sonrisa" (its second single) topped the Hot Latin Songs chart. It ended 1998 as the year's eighth-bestselling Latin album. Suavemente spent 98 consecutive weeks in the top 10 of the Top Latin Albums chart, the second-longest run in history.

The album remained atop the U.S. Tropical Albums chart for seven consecutive weeks after its release. It began sliding down the chart, but remained near the top. Suavemente returned to the top of the Tropical Albums chart after twelve weeks behind the Dance with Me soundtrack. The following week it sold 4,000 copies, remaining at number one. In the album's fourth consecutive week atop the chart, it sold 6,500 copies. During its fifth straight week atop the Tropical Albums chart, it sold 6,000 copies, down 16 percent. Suavemente ended 1998 as the fourth-bestselling tropical-music album. In its ninth consecutive week atop the Tropical Albums chart the album sold 7,000 copies, down 17 percent from the previous week. The following week, its tenth consecutive at number one, it sold 7,500 copies (up seven percent). For the week ending February 6, 1999, although sales of Suavemente dipped 13 percent to 6,500 copies the album remained atop the chart. On the February 27, 1999, chart, album sales increased by 67 percent. The following week sales decreased 30 percent to 7,000 copies, but Suavemente remained atop the Tropical Albums chart for its fourteenth straight week.

The album debuted at number 43 on the U.S. Billboard Heatseekers Albums chart for the week ending May 2, 1998; the following week, it rose to number 39. For the week ending May 16, the album jumped to number 13; the following week, it rose to number nine. In subsequent weeks, the album continued to rise up the chart; for the week ending June 13, it was number five.

== Singles ==
After "Suavemente" debuted at number 15 on the U.S. Billboard Hot Latin Songs chart for the week ending April 25, 1998, the magazine's John Lannert predicted that Crespo could "easily win a new artist award" in 1999. Billboard music analyst Karl Ross called the album's title song "a sultry [track] about the power of a kiss". For the week ending May 16 "Suavemente" peaked at number one, displacing "Una Fan Enamorada" by Servando y Florentino. Crespo became the first merengue recording artist with a number-one single on the Hot Latin Songs chart since Dominican singer Juan Luis Guerra's "El Costo De la Vida" six years earlier. "Suavemente" remained at number one with 13 million audience impressions, a four-percent increase over the previous week. The song broke the record for most weeks at number one for a tropical-music recording on the Hot Latin Songs chart (six) since Billboard began monitoring Latin airplay in 1986, and it was number one on the Tropical Songs chart for nine consecutive weeks. "Suavemente" ended 1998 as the year's most-successful tropical single. Sony Discos president Oscar Llord told Billboard about the "carefulness" of crossing over into the English-language market, calling the lead single a process done "naturally" as a result of two U.S. radio stations (in Miami and New) York requesting a Spanglish version. The bilingual version was released in Germany in the second quarter of 1999. "Suavemente" became Crespo's most-popular song and a "teenage anthem" in the Latino community. It was the first Sony Music Latin release to debut on the U.S. Billboard Hot 100 chart, peaking at number 84.

The album's second single, "Tu Sonrisa", was distributed to U.S. radio stations in the second week of July 1998. It debuted at number 21 on the U.S. Hot Latin Tracks chart, as "Suavemente" remained in the top five. The song peaked at number one on the Tropical Songs chart, Crespo's second number one. "Tu Sonrisa" topped the Hot Latin Tracks chart in its sixth week, the singer's second number one on that chart. It displaced "Te Quiero Tanto Tanto" by Mexican Latin pop group Onda Vaselina, and Crespo became the first merengue artist with two number-one Hot Latin Tracks singles. After a week at number one, "Tu Sonrisa" was displaced by Gloria Estefan's "Oye!". A week later it again topped the chart for one week before being displaced by "Perdido Sin Ti", Martin's fourth single from Vuelve. After the success of "Suavemente"'s bilingual version, Sony Music distributed a club mix of "Tu Sonrisa" to radio stations in February 1999. Billboard Latin music contributor Leila Cobo called the song "catchy" and (with "Suavemente") "irresistible". "Tu Sonrisa" is the fifteenth-most-successful Sony Discos single on the Hot Latin Tracks chart since the chart was established in 1999.

"Luna Llena", Suavemente's third single, debuted and peaked at number 29 on the Hot Latin Tracks chart for the week ending December 12, 1998. It dropped off the chart after a week before charting on Hot Latin Tracks and Tropical Songs at 33 and 13, respectively, for the week ending January 16, 1999. The song peaked at 26 and 11 on the Hot Latin Songs and Tropical Songs charts, respectively. The fourth and final single from the album, "Nuestra Cancion", was less successful; it peaked at number 17 on the Tropical Songs chart in 1999.

== Impact ==
Suavemente is considered to have revolutionized merengue music, making it a popular subgenre of Latin music, and the album brought Crespo international recognition in the merengue market. The singer is the first merengue artist with an album atop the U.S. Top Latin Albums chart, and two number-one songs on the U.S. Hot Latin Songs chart. Billboard cited Crespo and American singer-actor Carlos Ponce as jump-starting the US market with their albums. According to Billboard's Karl Ross, Crespo transcended the U.S. Latino market and his success may have been felt in Europe and the Pacific Rim. Sony Discos president Oscar Llord called Suavemente the "most successful debut album of a Tropical artist in history." Suavemente was listed as the third best-charting and -selling Sony Discos album during the Top Latin Albums twenty-fifth year in 1999. Crespo was ranked fifth on the Hot Latin Songwriters in 1998, eleventh on the Top Latin Albums Artists, seventh on the Hot Latin Tracks Artists, fourth on the Top Tropical Album Artists, and second on the Tropical Tracks Artists lists. Suavemente has been named one of the most essential Latin albums of the past 50 years by Billboard, and its title song became a staple in Latin-music nightclubs. The lead single also became a popular tune in Mexico, where it was used in festivals around the country. "Suavemente" ranked number 219 on Pitchfork's list of the 250 best songs of the 1990s. According to contributor Gio Santiago, "Suavemente" catapulted merengue into the mainstream, introducing it to a wider audience, and ending the genre's waning popularity. Since its release, the song has become a staple at any Latino gathering and elicits attendees to dance once the a cappella opening of the song begins, which is followed by an explosion of horns, güira, and percussion that evokes an endless state of euphoria, according to Santiago.

At the 1999 Billboard Latin Music Awards Crespo received four nominations (including Album of the Year and Hot Latin Track of the Year), tying him with Selena for the most nominations in a single year; the record was later broken by Tito El Bambino, with 18 nominations in 2010. He won New Artist Album of the Year and Latin Dance Maxi-Single of the Year. Crespo was the Latin 50 Artist of the Year at the 2000 Billboard Latin Music Awards (the top-selling Latin artist from January 1999 to January 2000). He was nominated for the Grammy Award for Best Tropical Latin Performance in 1999, losing to Marc Anthony's Contra la Corriente. At the 11th Premio Lo Nuestros, Crespo received six nominations and won five awards: Tropical Album of the Year, Tropical Song of the Year, Tropical Male Artist of the Year, Tropical-Salsa Duo or Group of the Year (shared with Milly Quezada), and Tropical New Artist of the Year.

== 20th anniversary ==
On April 11, 2019, the album was re-released to celebrate its 20th anniversary. Nine of its tracks were redone into a salsa or mambo version. The song "Abracadabra" was added.

== Track listing ==
No.	Title	Writer(s)	Length
1.	"Suavemente"	Elvis Crespo	4:28
2.	"Nuestra Canción"	Homero d'Rodriguez	3:30
3.	"Luna Llena"	Raldy Vázquez	4:26
4.	"Me Arrepiento"	Luis A. Cruz	3:47
5.	"Princesita"	Juan L. Guzman	4:49
6.	"Tu Sonrisa"	Elvis Crespo	4:34
7.	"Yo Me Moriré"	Juan Perez	3:33
8.	"Llorando"	Elvis Crespo	3:57
9.	"Por Qué?"	Vázquez	4:25
10.	"Te Vas"	Vázquez	4:19

20th Anniversary
No.	Title	Length
11.	"Abracadabra"	4:25

- Alternate version of Track #1-9 were made for this edition.
- The song "Te Vas" was the only song from the original edition not included nor remade. It was replaced by the song Abracadabra released in 2019. It was the only merengue in this edition as the other 9 songs were remade for another genre.

== Personnel ==
Adapted from AllMusic.

Vocals

- Elvis Crespo – vocals, backing vocalist, composer, producer
- Juan "Tun Tun" Castro – backing vocalist, arranger
- Roberto Cora – backing vocalist, arranger, mixing, producer
- Henry Garcia – backing vocalist
- Raldy Vasquez – backing vocalist

Musicians

- Luis Aquino – trumpet
- Jose Dario del Rosario – trumpet
- Jose Diaz – saxophone
- Luis A. Cruz – piano, producer
- Alexis Fratacelli – guitar
- Miguel Gonzalez – bass
- Hector Herreras – congas, percussion

Production

- Marcos Careera – arranger
- Israel Raynoso Casado – arranger
- Jose Gazmey – executive producer
- Richard Marcell – arranger, bass, director, keyboards, piano
- Maximo Torres – requinto
- Ricky Marti – engineer
- Papo Rios – mixing, producer

Design

- Rafi Claudio – photography
- Ed Coreano – designer

== Charts ==
=== Weekly charts ===
Chart (1998)	Peak position
US Billboard 200	106
US Billboard Top Latin Albums	1
US Billboard Tropical Albums	1
US Billboard Top Heatseekers	4

=== Quarterly charts ===
Chart (1998)	Peak position
US Billboard Top Latin Albums	11

=== Year-end charts ===
Chart (1998)	Peak position
US Billboard Top Latin Albums	8
US Billboard Tropical Albums	4
Chart (1999)	Peak position
US Billboard Top Latin Albums	2
US Billboard Tropical Albums	1
Chart (2000)	Peak position
US Billboard Top Latin Albums	23

== Certifications and sales ==
Region	Certification	Certified units/sales
Argentina (CAPIF)	2× Platinum	181,000
Central America (CFC)	Platinum	
Mexico (AMPROFON)	Platinum+Gold	350,000^{^}
Spain (Promusicae)	Gold	150,000
United States (RIAA)	26× Platinum (Latin)	879,000
Uruguay (CUD)	2× Platinum	12,000^{^}
Summaries
Europe	—	500,000
^{^} Shipments figures based on certification alone.

== See also ==
- 1998 in Latin music
- List of number-one Billboard Top Latin Albums from the 1990s
- List of number-one Billboard Tropical Albums from the 1990s
- List of best-selling Latin albums
- List of best-selling Latin albums in the United States

== Sources ==
- Morales, Ed (2003). The Latin Beat: The Rhythms And Roots Of Latin Music From Bossa Nova To Salsa And Beyond. Da Capo Press. ISBN 0-7867-3020-X.
- Pritchard, Connor; Russo, Dominic (2010). The Party Bible: The Good Book for Great Times. Adams Media. ISBN 978-1-4405-0812-7.
- Phelps, M. William (2008). I'll Be Watching You. Pinnacle Books. ISBN 978-0-7860-2718-7.
- Santana, Ramón Antonio Glass (2005). Merengue: ritmo que contagia! : historia del merengue en México. Plaza y Valdes. ISBN 970-722-419-3.
- Sellers, Julie A. (2004). Merengue and Dominican Identity: Music as National Unifier. McFarland & Company. ISBN 0-7864-1815-X.
- Brusca, Donny (2011). Dj Music List Essentials (2 ed.). Lulu.com. ISBN 978-1-257-11069-8.
- Shaw, Lisa; Dennison, Stephanie (2005). Pop Culture Latin America!: Media, Arts, and Lifestyle. ABC-CLIO. ISBN 1-85109-504-7.
