= List of Billboard Regional Mexican Albums number ones of 1999 =

The Regional Mexican Albums, published in Billboard magazine, is a record chart that features Latin music sales information for regional styles of Mexican music. This data are compiled by Nielsen SoundScan from a sample that includes music stores, music departments at department stores and verifiable sales from concert venues in the United States.

== Albums ==
This chart is for 1999.

Issue Date	Album	Artist	Reference
January 2	Entre El Amor Y Yo	Vicente Fernández	
January 9	Con la Banda...El Recodo	Juan Gabriel with Banda El Recodo	
January 16	Con la Banda...El Recodo	Juan Gabriel with Banda El Recodo	
January 23	Con la Banda...El Recodo	Juan Gabriel with Banda El Recodo	
January 30	Con la Banda...El Recodo	Juan Gabriel with Banda El Recodo	
February 6	Con la Banda...El Recodo	Juan Gabriel with Banda El Recodo	
February 13	El Amor Y Yo †	Vicente Fernández	
February 20	El Amor Y Yo †	Vicente Fernández	
February 27	El Amor Y Yo †	Vicente Fernández	
March 6	El Amor Y Yo †	Vicente Fernández	
March 13	Nuestro Amor	Los Tri-o	
March 20	Nuestro Amor	Los Tri-o	
March 27	All My Hits Vol. 1	Selena	
April 3	All My Hits Vol. 1	Selena	
April 10	All My Hits Vol. 1	Selena	
April 17	All My Hits Vol. 1	Selena	
April 24	All My Hits Vol. 1	Selena	
May 1	All My Hits Vol. 1	Selena	
May 8	All My Hits Vol. 1	Selena	
May 15	All My Hits Vol. 1	Selena	
May 22	All My Hits Vol. 1	Selena	
May 29	All My Hits Vol. 1	Selena	
June 5	All My Hits Vol. 1	Selena	
June 12	All My Hits Vol. 1	Selena	
June 19	All My Hits Vol. 1	Selena	
June 26	All My Hits Vol. 1	Selena	
July 3	All My Hits Vol. 1	Selena	
July 10	Herencia de Familia	Los Tigres del Norte	
July 17	Herencia de Familia	Los Tigres del Norte	
July 24	Herencia de Familia	Los Tigres del Norte	
July 31	Herencia de Familia	Los Tigres del Norte	
August 7	Herencia de Familia	Los Tigres del Norte	
August 14	Contigo	Intocable	
August 21	Herencia de Familia	Los Tigres del Norte	
August 28	Contigo †	Intocable	
September 4	All My Hits Vol. 2	Selena	
September 11	All My Hits Vol. 2	Selena	
September 18	Norteno 2000	Los Huracanes del Norte	
September 25	Norteno 2000	Los Huracanes del Norte	
October 2	Norteno 2000	Los Huracanes del Norte	
October 9	Norteno 2000	Los Huracanes del Norte	
October 16	All My Hits Vol. 2 †	Selena	
October 23	Y Los Mas Grandes Exitos De Los Dandy's	Vicente Fernández	
October 30	Y Los Mas Grandes Exitos De Los Dandy's	Vicente Fernández	
November 6	Y Los Mas Grandes Exitos De Los Dandy's	Vicente Fernández	
November 13	Lo Mejor De Mi Vida	Banda El Recodo	
November 20	Lo Mejor De Mi Vida	Banda El Recodo	
November 27	Lo Mejor De Mi Vida	Banda El Recodo	
December 4	Lo Mejor De Mi Vida	Banda El Recodo	
December 11	Lo Mejor De Mi Vida	Banda El Recodo	
December 18	Lo Mejor De Mi Vida	Banda El Recodo	
December 25	Lo Mejor De Mi Vida	Banda El Recodo	
