= Equilíbrio Distante =

Studio album by Renato Russo
- Released: December 1995
- Recorded: 1995
- Genre: Pop music, acoustic rock, classical crossover
- Length: 65:12 (according to FUSCALDO, 2016); 64:38 (according to the booklet)
- Language: Italian
- Label: EMI
- Producer: Renato Russo, Carlos Trilha

Renato Russo chronology
The Stonewall Celebration Concert (1994)	Equilíbrio Distante (1995)	O Último Solo (1997)

Equilibrio Distante (English: Distant Balance) is the second solo album by Brazilian singer Renato Russo (and the last released before his death), released in December 1995. It consists of covers of Italian songs originally released by musicians from that country. The album came after a troubled period for Russo, who was struggling with depression at that time, and its recording took nine months. It sold 200 thousand copies little after its release.

== Production ==
=== Background ===
Russo mentioned the project for the first time to keyboardist Carlos Trilha (who toured with his main band, Legião Urbana, and who had participated in his solo debut, The Stonewall Celebration Concert) after a Legião's show at Metropolitan, in Rio de Janeiro.

He had never listened to Italian music before, but he bought 12 CDs in a local store in Rio de Janeiro and learned that the Italian singing style was similar to his own, and that the lyrics dealt with similar themes to those of Legião Urbana.

=== Trip to Italy ===
Following a suggestion by label EMI-Odeon, Russo traveled to Italy to deepen his researches for the album. Initially, he was reluctant because he feared being mistaken for a terrorist due to his looks – indeed, he was randomly picked for a search at Milan's Airport.

He ended up accepting the proposal after he had the opportunity to invite Gilda Mattoso to come long. Mattoso had been a press agent for labels Ariola Discos and PolyGram and in 1989 she had opened an office with her business partner Marcus Vinícius to do PR to artists such as Gilberto Gil, Cazuza, Caetano Veloso, Elba Ramalho, among others. Previously, she had lived and studied in Italy, helping producer Franco Fontana take Brazilian artists to the country. She eventually married one of them – Vinicius de Moraes.

In the comuna of Sesto ed Uniti (more precisely in the municipality of Sesto Cremonese), Russo learned his ancestors were peasants, and not noble people as he believed. He was less disturbed, however, after he was informed that it was there that the Stradivarius violins were created.

The trip, which consisted in four nights in Milan and another four in Rome, resulted in visits to Italian musicians and a big quantity of acquired albums – over 200. He also took the chance to obtain some necessary documents from his great-grandparents Maria and Piero to acquire Italian citizenship for him and his son.

The chosen repertoire, according to Italians Russo approached during his researches, does not represent Italy. On the other hand, names such as Laura Pausini gained some popularity in Brazil after being revealed on the album.

=== Recording ===
The album's recording took place throughout 1995, and was done by computer and then transferred to magnetic tapes, since the arrangements involved more instruments and the channels at that time were limited.

The first recording problems involved the bass guitar. Russo wouldn't approve Marcos Pessoa's work. Trilha found a solution in Arthur Maia, who would refine the desired parts. Bruno Araújo, another Legião Urbana supporting member, also played the instrument, apart from Russo himself.

Besides, Trilha recalls having to deal with the unpredictability of Russo, never being able to predict whether he would like something or not. The vocals became another problem: not used to that kind of music (compared to his work with Legião Urbana), Russo disliked the first recording, abandoned the studio for some time and cancelled sessions. He was also lacking confidence due to the accent he believed he had. In order to work his way around it, he took private Italian lessons.

By the time of the album's release, however, Russo said in an interview with International Magazine that "their [Italians] singing style is very similar to mine" and that their thematic was similar to that of Legião Urbana, "which is that thing of speaking about ethics, love songs that have a social background... Always that thing of the subject confused with the world, trying to solve the matters of the world".

"Passerà" was one of the first songs Russo showed Trilha. About it, the keyboardist commented:

[...] it's a song that required a lot of work. I hated this song afterwards, because it's got a weird harmony. [...] The shorter way between two points is not a straight line, but eight notes. The Italians have this school of making the harmony more sophisticated and use modulation. On the keyboard, to prepare an arrangement, when there's modulation, everything changes. It required a lot of work.

Many other songs were recorded (a total of 21 were conceived for the album), however, they didn't have their arrangements ready and were cut from the final track list. They were later finished and released on O Último Solo, his first posthumous solo album.

Equilíbrio Distante came out in December 1995, a month before Russo had to return to the studio to commence work on those which would be the last Legião Urbana albums.

== Cover art ==
The album cover features drawings by Giuliano Manfredini, Russo's son (who was 6 around that time), in textured paper. They depict the Sugar Loaf, the Maracanã Stadium, the Colosseum and the Tower of Pisa (spelled Tower of "Pizza").

The booklet came shaped as a small book per Russo's idea, containing initial letters inspired by 19th century typography. It also had pictures of Russo's ancestors and pictures resulted from his research. The artistic director Egeu Laus said that was the first time a Brazilian album featured such a graphic project. Only one printing company in Rio de Janeiro had the necessary equipment to print that booklet.

== Reception ==
In a brief review, Folha de S.Paulo said the album "fails to repeat the delicate lyricism of The Stonewall Celebration Concert" and defines it as "tacky", listing as possible reasons "the language, the mellow arrangements and the repertoire choice".

== Track list ==
No.	Title	Writer(s)	Original artist	Length
1.	"Gente"	Cheope, Marco Marati, Angelo Valsiglio	Laura Pausini	5:30
2.	"Strani Amori"	Roberto Buti, Cheope, Marco, Angelo	Laura Pausini	4:10
3.	"I Venti del Cuore"	Piero Fabrizi, Massimo Bubola	Fiorella Mannoia	4:40
4.	"Scrivimi"	Nino Buonocore	Nino Buonocore	3:58
5.	"Dolcissima Maria"	Mauro Pagani, Flavio Franco Premoli, Franco Mussida	Premiata Forneria Marconi	7:58
6.	"Lettera"	Cheope, Marco, Giovanni Salvatori, Angelo	Laura Pausini	3:36
7.	"La Solitudine"	Federico Cavalli, Pietro Cremonesi, Angelo	Laura Pausini	4:10
8.	"Passerà"	Falagiani, Bigazzi, Aleandro Baldi	Aleandro	4:47
9.	"Come Fa Un'Onda"	Nelson Motta, Lulu Santos (version: Massimiliano de Tomassi)	Massimiliano ("Come Fa Un'Onda") / Tom Jobim ("Wave")	3:31
10.	"La Forza della Vita"	Dati, Paulo Vallesi	Paulo and Beppe Dati	5:17
11.	"Due"	Cheope, Testa, Raf	Raf	5:06
12.	"Più o Meno"	Renato Zero	Renato Zero	3:23
13.	"La Vita È Adesso"	Claudio Baglioni	Claudio	9:03
Total length:				65:12

== Personnel ==
Adapted from the booklet and from FUSCALDO, 2016:

=== Musicians ===
- Renato Russo
  - Vocals on all tracks;
  - Acoustic guitar on "Gente", "Dolcissima Maria", "Lettera", "La Solitudine" and "La Forza Della Vita";
  - Bass on "Gente"
  - Twelve-string guitar on "I Venti Del Cuore";
  - Keyboards on "Gente", "I Venti Del Cuore", "Dolcissima Maria", "Passerà", "Come Fa Un'Onda", "Due" and "La Vita É Adesso";
  - Lauto on "I Venti Del Cuore"; (Note: The booklet is almost entirely in Italian and it states Russo played "lauto" on this track, but such word does not exist in Italian. Presumably, it was referring to a flute ("flauto") or a lute ("liuto").)
  - Pandeireta on "La Vita É Adesso".
- Carlos Trilha – keyboards on all tracks except "Più o Meno", in which he played the piano; programming on all tracks except "Strani Amori", "Lettera" and "Più o Meno"; rhythm-track on "Due"
- Paulo Lourenço – guitar on "Strani Amori", "Due"; acoustic guitar on "Strani Amori"
- Paulo Loureiro – acoustic guitar on "Scrivimi" (Note: The booklet says "Paulo Loureiro" played the acoustic guitar on this track, but it could have been a typographical error and it actually meant Paulo Lourenço.)
- Ricardo Palmeira – acoustic guitar on "Dolcissima Maria" and "La Vita É Adesso"
- Cláudio Jorge – acoustic guitar on "Come Fa Un'Onda"
- Arthur Maia – bass guitar on "Strani Amori", "Scrivimi", "Passerà", "Come Fa Un'Onda", "La Forza Della Vita" and "Due"
- Bruno Araújo – bass guitar on "Dolcissima Maria" and "La Vita É Adesso"
- Marcos Pessoa – bass guitar on "I Venti Del Cuore"
- Eduardo Constant – drums on "Gente", "Strani Amori", "I Venti Del Cuore", "Dolcissima Maria", "Passerà", "Due" and "La Vita É Adesso"
- Jota Moraes – arrangement and conducting on "Più o Meno"
- Pareschi – spalla
- José Alves, Vidal, Daltro, Perrotta and Bernardo Bessler – violins
- Jairo and Marie Bessler – violas
- Alceu Reis and Marcelo Salles – cellos
- Denner Campolina – acoustic double bass
- Betina Graziani, Nair de Cândia and Jurema de Cândia – choir
- Robert Shaw, Renato Cellini, Robert Shaw Chorale, RCA Victor Orchestra – choir on "La Vita È Adesso"

=== Technical personnel ===
- Renato Russo – production, execution, arrangements, graphic project
- Carlos Trilha – production, execution, arrangements
- Edu de Oliveira – mixing
- Ricardo Garcia – mastering
- Fábio Henriques and Guilherme Reis – sound engineering
- João Augusto – A&R
- Mano Produções Artísticas – management
- Egeu Laus – artistic management and graphic project
- Giuliano Manfredini – drawings
- Flávio Colker – double page photograph
- Marcos Prado – Renato Russo photograph
- Tarcisio Mattos – Carlos Trilha photograph

== Bibliography ==
- Conversações com Renato Russo. Campo Grande: Letra Livre. 1996. ISBN 978-85-86399-02-2.
- Fuscaldo, Chris (2016). Discobiografia Legionária. LeYa. ISBN 978-85-441-0481-1.
