= List of number-one Billboard Regional Mexican Songs of 1999 =

The Billboard Regional Mexican Songs chart ranks the best-performing Regional Mexican singles in the United States. Published weekly by Billboard magazine, it ranks the "most popular regional Mexican songs, ranked by radio airplay audience impressions as measured by Nielsen Music."

== Chart history ==
Key
†	Indicates number 1 on Billboard's year-end Latin pop chart

Issue date	Song	Artist(s)	Ref.
January 2	"La otra parte del amor"	Grupo Límite	
January 9	"La otra parte del amor"	Grupo Límite	
January 16	"La otra parte del amor"	Grupo Límite	
January 23	"La otra parte del amor"	Grupo Límite	
January 30	"Creí"	Tiranos del Norte	
February 6	"Creí"	Tiranos del Norte	
February 13	"Creí"	Tiranos del Norte	
February 20	"Adorable mentirosa"	Juan Gabriel & Banda el Recodo	
February 27	"Adorable mentirosa"	Juan Gabriel & Banda el Recodo	
March 6	"Adorable mentirosa"	Juan Gabriel & Banda el Recodo	
March 13	"Adorable mentirosa"	Juan Gabriel & Banda el Recodo	
March 20	"Adorable mentirosa"	Juan Gabriel & Banda el Recodo	
March 27	"Adorable mentirosa"	Juan Gabriel & Banda el Recodo	
April 3	"Necesito decirte" †	Conjunto Primavera	
April 10	"Necesito decirte" †	Conjunto Primavera	
April 17	"Necesito decirte" †	Conjunto Primavera	
April 24	"Necesito decirte" †	Conjunto Primavera	
May 1	"Necesito decirte" †	Conjunto Primavera	
May 8	"Necesito decirte" †	Conjunto Primavera	
May 15	"Necesito decirte" †	Conjunto Primavera	
May 22	"Necesito decirte" †	Conjunto Primavera	
May 29	"Necesito decirte" †	Conjunto Primavera	
June 5	"Necesito decirte" †	Conjunto Primavera	
June 12	"Necesito decirte" †	Conjunto Primavera	
June 19	"Lágrimas"	Los Tigres del Norte	
June 26	"Necesito decirte" †	Conjunto Primavera	
July 3	"Necesito decirte" †	Conjunto Primavera	
July 10	"Lágrimas"	Los Tigres del Norte	
July 17	"Necesito decirte" †	Conjunto Primavera	
July 24	"Lágrimas"	Los Tigres del Norte	
July 31	"Lágrimas"	Los Tigres del Norte	
August 7	"Lágrimas"	Los Tigres del Norte	
August 14	"Lágrimas"	Los Tigres del Norte	
August 21	"Necesito decirte" †	Conjunto Primavera	
August 28	"Lágrimas"	Los Tigres del Norte	
September 4	"Necesito decirte"	Conjunto Primavera	
September 11	"El peor de mis fracasos"	Marco Antonio Solís	
September 18	"Lágrimas"	Los Tigres del Norte	
September 25	"Necesito decirte" †	Conjunto Primavera	
October 2	"Necesito decirte" †	Conjunto Primavera	
October 9	"Necesito decirte" †	Conjunto Primavera	
October 16	"Necesito decirte" †	Conjunto Primavera	
October 23	"Necesito decirte" †	Conjunto Primavera	
October 30	"Te quiero mucho"	Los Rieleros del Norte	
November 6	"Te quiero mucho"	Los Rieleros del Norte	
November 13	"Te quiero mucho"	Los Rieleros del Norte	
November 20	"Te quiero mucho"	Los Rieleros del Norte	
November 27	"Te quiero mucho"	Los Rieleros del Norte	
December 4	"Te ofrezco un corazón"	Banda el Recodo de Cruz Lizárraga	
December 11	"Te quiero mucho"	Los Rieleros del Norte	
December 18	"Te ofrezco un corazón"	Banda el Recodo de Cruz Lizárraga	
December 25	"Te quiero mucho"	Los Rieleros del Norte	
