= The Stonewall Celebration Concert =

Studio album by Renato Russo
- Released: 1994
- Recorded: The album was recorded and mixed late February and March 1994, at Discover Studio, Rio de Janeiro.
- Genres: Rock, folk
- Length: 68:12
- Label: EMI
- Producers: Carlos Trilha, Renato Russo

Renato Russo chronology
The Stonewall Celebration Concert (1994)	Equilíbrio Distante (1995)

Professional ratings
Review scores
Source	Rating
AllMusic	4/5 stars

The Stonewall Celebration Concert is the debut studio album by Brazilian singer Renato Russo, released in 1994. The album had a sale of 250,000 copies in the first year of its release. It was one of the first Brazilian albums to be entirely recorded with computers. and it sees Russo covering English-language songs by Madonna, Bob Dylan, Nick Drake, Billy Joel, among others.

For his performance in the album, he was voted Best Singer by the APCA in 1994.

== Background and planning ==
Russo took inspiration from a Nick Drake album to create his solo debut. Because the economical moment was favorable, the label gave him total freedom to create his material.

The original plan was to do a special show with Russo singing accompanied by Carlos Trilha on the piano in order to raise funds to the Ação da Cidadania Contra a Fome, a Miséria e Pela Vida (Citizen Action Against Hunger and Poverty and for Life) campaign, created by Herbert de Souza, who died in 1997 of AIDS-related issues.

After an initial performance at actor Marco Nanini's house and after listening to Trilha's keyboard programming for the show, Russo decided to register the project in studio while keeping its fundraising objectives towards that campaign.

48 songs were prepared for the album, but only 21 made it to the final track list. Four had to be cut in the last minute due to a 70-minute limitation imposed by the CD factory; these were later released on the posthumous solo album O Último Solo (the source says 30 of the 48 songs were disposed of).

Russo believed he was the only one to know "Cathedral Song" at that time, but singer Zélia Duncan released her self-titled debut album that same year and it contained a Portuguese-language version of it.

== Concept ==
The album was a tribute to twenty five years of the Stonewall riots in New York City.

The cover is a tribute to Rock 'n' Roll, by John Lennon, and shows Russo by the door of his building at Rua Nascimento Silva. The building's number was digitally removed later in order to preserve the musicians privacy. The booklet provides information twenty-nine social entities, including the Gay Group of Bahia, ISER (Instituto de Estudos da Religião/Institute of Religious Studies), Greenpeace, Sociedade Viva Cazuza (Cazuza Viva Society) and ABIA (Associação Brasileira Interdisciplinar de AIDS/Brazilian Interdisciplinary AIDS Association).

== Songs ==
The repertoire brings standards of American music and songs featured in films - of which many were part of his musical education. Some of the songs included are: "Cathedral Song", Tanita Tikaram's music phenomenon of the 90's; "Miss Celie's Blues", from the soundtrack of The Color Purple, composed by Lionel Richie, Quincy Jones and Rod Temperton; his own version of the theme of Walt Disney's Pinocchio, "When You Wish upon a Star", written by Ned Washington and Leigh Harline;"Cherish", Madonna's success, but with a more folk tune and his strong vocal impression; and Bob Dylan's record "If You See Her, Say Hello", from the original 1975 album Blood on the Tracks, with the title changed to "If You See Him, Say Hello".

== Track listing ==
No.	Title	Length
1.	"Send in the Clowns" (Stephen Sondheim)	3:40
2.	"Clothes of Sand" (Nick Drake)	2:42
3.	"Cathedral Song" (Tanita Tikaram)	2:57
4.	"Love Is" (Anna McGarrigle, Jane McGarrigle, Kate McGarrigle)	3:52
5.	"Cherish" (Madonna, Patrick Leonard)	4:34
6.	"Miss Celie's Blues" (Lionel Richie, Quincy Jones, Rod Temperton)	2:09
7.	"The Ballad of the Sad Young Men" (Fran Landesman, Tommy Wolf)	3:40
8.	"If I Loved You" (Richard Rodgers, Oscar Hammerstein II)	1:55
9.	"And So It Goes" (Billy Joel)	3:06
10.	"I Get Along Without You Very Well" (Hoagy Carmichael)	2:32
11.	"Somewhere in My Broken Heart" (Billy Dean, Richard Leigh)	2:42
12.	"If You See Him, Say Hello" (Bob Dylan)	3:47
13.	"If Tomorrow Never Comes" (Garth Brooks, Kent Blazy)	5:00
14.	"The Heart of the Matter" (Don Henley, JD Souther, Mike Campbell)	5:36
15.	"Old Friend" (Gretchen Cryer, Nancy Ford)	3:20
16.	"Say It Isn't So" (Irving Berlin)	3:35
17.	"Let's Face the Music and Dance" (Irving Berlin)	1:32
18.	"Somewhere" (Leonard Bernstein, Stephen Sondheim)	4:42
19.	"Paper of Pins" (Traditional)	1:57
20.	"When You Wish upon a Star" (Leigh Harline, Ned Washington)	3:16
21.	"Close the Door Lightly When You Go" (Eric Andersen)	2:21

== Personnel ==
- Renato Russo - Lead, acoustic guitar, occasional keyboards, percussion
- Carlos Trilha - keyboards and arrangements

=== Technical staff ===
- Carlos Trilha - producing, programming
- Renato Russo - producing, arranging
- Fábio Henriques - engineering, mixing and mastering
- Márcio Tavares de Lima - studio assistant
- Reginaldo Ferreira da Costa - personal assistant
- Renato Russo, Egeus Laus, Maurício Valladares - graphic design
- João Augusto - A & R Production

== Bibliography ==
- Conversações com Renato Russo. Campo Grande: Letra Livre. 1996. ISBN 978-85-86399-02-2.
- Fuscaldo, Chris (2016). Discobiografia Legionária. LeYa. ISBN 978-85-441-0481-1.
