= Nino Buonocore =

Italian singer-songwriter

- Born: 26 July 1958 (age 68); Naples
- Occupation: singer-songwriter

Nino Buonocore (born 26 July 1958) is an Italian singer-songwriter, best known for the songs "Rosanna" and "Scrivimi".

== Life and career ==
Born Adelmo Buonocore in Naples, he debuted at 20 years old with an auto-produced single "Sferisterio". Put under contract by RCA, he released several albums with a style close to British new wave and synthpop music of the time. His 2nd album was produced by Simon Boswell. The turning point of his career was his participation in the 1987 Sanremo Music Festival with the song "Rosanna", which was his first real commercial success and marked a transition towards a more melodic and sophisticated style. His biggest hit was the 1990 romantic ballad "Scrivimi", a song which was covered in twelve languages and which sold about 4 million copies.

== Discography ==
=== Studio albums ===
- 1980 - Acida (RCA)
- 1982 - Yaya (RCA)
- 1983 - Nino in copertina (RCA)
- 1984 - Nino Buonocore (EMI)
- 1988 - Una città tra le mani (EMI)
- 1990 - Sabato, domenica e lunedì (EMI)
- 1992 - La naturale incertezza del vivere (EMI)
- 1993 - Un po' di più (EMI)
- 1998 - Alti e bassi (Easy Records-RTI Music)
- 2004 - Libero passeggero, as Nino Buonocore Sextet (Cd+DVD) (La Canzonetta Record)
- 2009 - Scrivimi "Greatest Studio Unplugged", as Nino Buonocore Sextet (Azzurra Music)
- 2013 - Segnali di umana presenza (Hydra Music)
- 2021 - Nino Buonocore in Jazz "live" (Egea Music)

=== Compilation albums ===
- 1998 - Il meglio di Nino Buonocore (RCA-BMG)
- 2004 - Made in Italy (EMI Italiana)
- 2007 - Solo grandi successi (EMI Italiana)
- 2009 - Made in Italy - New Version (EMI Italiana)
