= Dance with Me (soundtrack) =

Dance with Me: Music from the Motion Picture

Soundtrack album by Various Artists
- Released: August 11, 1998
- Genre: Latin music
- Label: Sony

Professional ratings
Review scores
Source	Rating
Allmusic	3/5 stars

Dance with Me: Music from the Motion Picture is the soundtrack album released on August 11, 1998 by Sony Music. It includes the songs used on the movie Dance with Me starring Vanessa L. Williams and Chayanne. The movie and soundtrack were promoted with the song "Refugio de Amor", performed by Williams and Chayanne, which peaked at number 4 in the Billboard Latin Pop Songs chart. The album peaked at number one on the Billboard Top Latin Albums chart for six consecutive weeks.

== Track listing ==
No.	Title	Writer(s)	Performer	Length
1.	"Magalenha"	Carlinhos Brown	Sérgio Mendes	3:39
2.	"Heaven's What I Feel (Dance Mix)"	Kike Santander	Gloria Estefan	5:09
3.	"You Are My Home"	Diane Warren	Vanessa L. Williams and Chayanne	5:10
4.	"Jibaro (Dance With Me '98 Remix)"	León Marín "Nelson", Javier Marín "Elkin"	Electra	4:36
5.	"Fiesta Pa'Los Rumberos"	Roberto Blades, Emilio Estefan, Jr.	Albita	5:03
6.	"Want You, Miss You, Love You"	Rob Mathes	Jon Secada	4:01
7.	"Jazz Machine"	P. Landro, M. Percall	Black Machine	3:31
8.	"Echa Pa' Lante (Spanish Cha-Cha Mix)"	Roberto Blades, Emilio Estefan, Jr., Pablo Flores, Javier Garza	Thalía	3:53
9.	"Atrévete (No Puedes Conmigo)"	Manny Benito, Sergio George	DLG	4:11
10.	"Eres Todo en Mí (You're My Everything)"	Jean-Manuel De Scarano, Raymond Donnez, Leroy Gomes	Ana Gabriel	5:13
11.	"Refugio de Amor (You Are My Home)"	Warren	Vanessa L. Williams and Chayanne	5:30
12.	"Tres Deseos (Three Wishes) (12 Remix)"	Kike Santander	Gloria Estefan	5:00
13.	"Patria"	Rubén Blades	Rubén Blades	4:10
14.	"Pantera en Libertad (Radio Edit)"	Mónica Naranjo, Cristobal Sansano, José M. Navarro	Mónica Naranjo	3:26
15.	"Suavemente"	Elvis Crespo, Roberto Cora	Elvis Crespo	4:17

== Chart performance ==
Chart (1998)	Peak position
US Billboard Top Latin Albums	1
US Billboard Tropical Albums	1
US Billboard 200	54

== See also ==
- List of number-one Billboard Top Latin Albums from the 1990s
- List of number-one Billboard Tropical Albums from the 1990s
