= Scrivimi =

Single by Nino Buonocore

from the album Sabato, domenica e lunedì
- B-side: "Abitudini"
- Released: 1990
- Label: EMI Italiana
- Songwriters: Nino Buonocore; Michele De Vitis
- Producer: Willy David

Nino Buonocore singles chronology
"Con l'acqua alla gola" (1988)	"Scrivimi" (1990)	"Il mandorlo" (1992)

Audio
- "Scrivimi" on YouTube

"Scrivimi" (lit. 'Write to me') is a 1990 song composed and performed by Italian singer-songwriter Nino Buonocore.

== Background ==
The signature song of Bonocore, it has been described as an "elegant acoustic ballad", characterized by "sincere and effective lyrics" and "sophisticated yet simple music". The song has sold a total of over 4 million copies.

Artists who covered the song include Laura Pausini, Mango, Bruno Lauzi, Anna Oxa, Renato Russo and Fabio Concato; Argentine singer Patricia Sosa covered the song in Spanish as "Escribeme" and Marco Borsato covered it in Dutch as "Denk aan mij". The song should be not confused with a song with the same title launched in 1948 by Luciano Tajoli.

== Track listing ==
No.	Title	Length
1.	"Scrivimi"	3:56
2.	"Abitudini"	4:19

== Charts ==
=== Weekly charts ===
Chart (1990)	Peak position
Italy (Musica e dischi)	2
Italy Airplay (Music & Media)	2
