= Nuestra Canción =

Single by Monsieur Periné featuring Vicente García

from the album Caja de música
- Released: April 28, 2015
- Recorded: 2015
- Studio: Sony Music
- Length: 4:20
- Label: Sony Music
- Songwriter: Catalina García
- Producer: Eduardo Cabra

Official video
- "Nuestra Canción" on YouTube

"Nuestra Canción" (English: "Our Song") is a single by Colombian band Monsieur Periné featuring Vicente García, from the studio album Caja de Música (2015). In October 2021, the song gained popularity due to its use in an edit of Bugs Bunny dressed as a woman, which led to its widespread use on the video-sharing app TikTok, receiving over 12 million views for the month.

== Background ==
Despite being released in April 2015, the song became a sleeper hit and gained popularity in October 2021 due to widespread use on the app TikTok.

== Music video ==
The music video was released on April 7, 2016 on YouTube. It was filmed near the Neusa reservoir in the Cundinamarca region of Colombia, and was directed by Christian Schmid Rincon. The video depicts a flower festival.

== Charts ==
Chart (2021)	Peak position
US Hot Latin Songs (Billboard)	13

== Certifications ==
Region	Certification	Certified units/sales
United States (RIAA)	2× Platinum (Latin)	120,000^{‡}
^{‡} Sales+streaming figures based on certification alone.
