= Tu Sonrisa =

Single by Elvis Crespo

from the album Suavemente
- Released: July 1998
- Recorded: AQ-30 Studio de Ricardo Marty, Bayamon, Puerto Rico
- Genre: Merengue
- Length: 4:33
- Label: Sony Discos
- Songwriter: Elvis Crespo

Elvis Crespo singles chronology
"Suavemente" (1998)	"Tu Sonrisa" (1998)	"Luna Lena" (1998)

"Tu Sonrisa" (English: Your Smile) is a song recorded and composed by the American merengue music artist Elvis Crespo. It was released as the second single from his first solo album Suavemente (1998).

== Chart performance ==
"Tu Sonrisa" was released onto U.S. radios in the second week of July 1998. It debuted at number 21 on the U.S. Hot Latin Tracks chart, while "Suavemente" remained in the top five. "Tu Sonrisa" jumped to number 10 the following week. On its third week on the chart, "Tu Sonrisa" climbed to number five. On the Tropical/Salsa Songs chart, the song peaked at number one, giving Crespo his second number one song after "Suavemente". "Tu Sonrisa" peaked at number one on the Hot Latin Tracks chart on its sixth week, giving Crespo his second number one on the chart. The song displaced "Te Quiero Tanto Tanto" by the Mexican Latin pop group Onda Vaselina, while Crespo became the first merengue recording artist to have two number one Hot Latin Tracks singles. After spending one week at number one, "Tu Sonrisa" was displaced by the Cuban pop singer Gloria Estefan's "Oye!". However, in the following week it topped the chart. It was displaced once more by Martin's fourth single from his Vuelve album "Perdido Sin Ti" the following week.

== Charts ==
=== Weekly charts ===
Chart (1998)	Peak position
US Billboard Hot Latin Tracks	1
US Billboard Latin Pop Airplay	4
US Billboard Tropical Songs	1

=== Year-end charts ===
Chart (1998)	Peak position
US Billboard Hot Latin Tracks	15
US Billboard Tropical Songs	2
