= O Último Solo =

Studio album by Renato Russo
- Released: October 1997
- Recorded: 1994, 1995 and 1997
- Studio: Discover Digital Studio (Rio de Janeiro); Abbey Road Studios (London)
- Genre: Rock, pop
- Length: 28:27
- Language: Portuguese
- Label: EMI
- Producer: Carlos Trilha

Renato Russo chronology
Equilíbrio Distante (1995)	O Último Solo (1997)	Presente (2003)

O Último Solo (English: The Last Solo) is the third solo album by Brazilian singer Renato Russo, released in 1997, one year after his death. It is composed of songs recorded for his two previous solo albums, The Stonewall Celebration Concert (1994, entirely in English) and Equilíbrio Distante (1995, entirely in Italian). It has a new, interactive track containing a video of "Strani amori" (from Equilíbrio Distante), parts of an interview with Russo and information about the album.

== Production and recording ==
According to a text signed by João Augusto and published on the booklet, to record more tracks than what would really be featured in the final products was standard procedure for Russo. He himself would comment that his albums were born triple, became doubles and ended up released as single ones.

The selected songs didn't have their arrangements finished. Carlos Trilha, a keyboardist and Russo's regular solo musical partner, worked on them for eight months, taking into account ideas Russo had left before dying and ideas Trilha himself deduced would be of his friend's taste. Trilha cried many times as he listened to Russo's works. Three songs had to be disposed due to their quality, which was deemed below the album's league.

Some tracks that had been recorded with guide vocals (low-quality vocals recorded only so the producers or other musicians can better understand the song) only had to undergo a long process of technical adjustments so they could be released. Some still retained the metronome click, for example. It was to correct such details that O Último Solo became the first Brazilian album to use Auto-Tune.

For two tracks ("The Dance" and "Il Mondo Degli Altri"), an orchestra with over 40 musicians was hired and their performance was recorded at Studio 1 at Abbey Road Studios – one of the ideas left by Russo. According to Trilha, at that time it was cheaper to go to London and record the orchestra than to host a session in Brazil. Augusto and Trilha returned to the studio to master the album with Nick Webb (Paul McCartney, Genesis, Oasis, Pink Floyd, The Rolling Stones).

During the album preparation, Trilha discussed it with O Globo journalist Antônio Carlos Miguel, which infuriated the EMI board of directors, since the project was considered a secret back than. The feud was settled later, before the album release.

=== Title and cover ===
The title O Último Solo was chosen by Renato Manfredini, Russo's father, and it possesses a double entendre: it suggests it is the last solo album by Russo and it is also a reference to the soil ("solo", in Portuguese) filled with flowers around which he wanted his ashes to be scattered.

The cover is signed by Egeu Laus again and it is based on a painting by Carmem Teresa Manfredini, Russo's sister (he used to say in his life that the painting was his and that one day he would take it to his apartment). The booklet also features pictures of some of Russo's personal objects, taken by a photographer hired by Laus. The pictures were taken at Russo's apartment with permission from his father.

== Track list ==
No.	Title	Writer(s)	Length
1.	"Hey, That's no Way to Say Goodbye"	Leonard Cohen	3:02
2.	"The Dance"	Tony Arata	2:41
3.	"Il Mondo Degli Altri"	A. Civai, F. Palmieri	4:22
4.	"Ti Chiedo Onestà"	A. Civai, G. Bigazzi, M. Falagiani	5:00
5.	"Lettera"	A. Valsiglio, Cheope, G. Salvatori, M. Marati	3:29
6.	"I Loves You, Porgy"	DuBose Heyward, George Gershwin, Ira Gershwin	3:29
7.	"E Tu Come Stai?"	Claudio Baglioni	3:44
8.	"Change Partners"	Irving Berlin	2:40
Total length:			28:27

== Personnel ==
- Renato Russo – vocals
- Tom Capone – guitars
- Paulo Loureiro – acoustic guitars
- Arthur Maia – bass
- Marcos Pessoa – bass
- Carlos Trilha – keyboards, production
- Eduardo Constant – drums
- Florencia Saraiva – technical assistance
- Egeu Laus – cover
