= Suavemente (Elvis Crespo song) =

1998 single by Elvis Crespo

Single by Elvis Crespo

from the album Suavemente
- Released: April 4, 1998
- Recorded: AQ-30 Studio de Ricardo Marty, Bayamón, Puerto Rico
- Genre: Merengue
- Length: 4:27
- Label: Sony Discos
- Songwriter: Elvis Crespo
- Producer: Roberto Cora

Elvis Crespo singles chronology
"Suavemente" (1998)	"Tu Sonrisa" (1998)

"Suavemente" (English: "Softly") is a song recorded and composed by Puerto Rican merengue singer Elvis Crespo on his first solo album, Suavemente, which followed his departure from Grupo Manía. Released as the lead single, "Suavemente" reached number one on the Billboard Hot Latin Tracks on May 16, 1998, and remained atop the chart for six weeks. Crespo re-recorded it with Spanglish lyrics. The song also hit the Billboard Hot 100 as well as received a Premios Lo Nuestro award and two Latin Billboard Music Awards the following year. "Suavemente" was the tenth best-performing Latin single of 1998. The song has been covered by several artists, some of whom also charted.

== Background ==
Elvis Crespo started his singing career as a backup vocalist for merengue singers Willie Berrios, Lenny Perez, and Toño Rosario. In 1995, he joined Puerto-Rican merengue band, Grupo Manía as lead vocalist. He composed "Linda Eh'" for the group which reached number-eight on Hot Latin Tracks in 1996. In 1997, he left the band to pursue a solo career and recorded his first album, Suavemente, on the Sony Discos label. Crespo credited his son for the success of the song stating that his son spent the entire afternoon singing it and told his father that the song would be a hit. The Spanglish version was featured in the 1998 film, Dance with Me. Two music videos were made: the original version with various background montages, the other one a remix with Spanglish lyrics. In 2008, the song served as the intro and outro for the live album, Elvis Crespo Lives: Live at Las Vegas and the title reappeared in the title for his tenth anniversary compilation album, Suavemente... Los Éxitos.

== Track listings ==
CD, maxi

- Side A
1. "Suavemente" [Spanglish Dance Mix] – (4:19)
2. "Suavemente" [Spanglish Edit] – (4:27)
- Side B
1. "Suavemente" [The Factory Dance Mix] – (6:40)
2. "Suavemente" [Dance Radio Edit] – (4:19)

12"

1. "Suavemente" [Cibola Mix] – (3:30)
2. "Suavemente" [Hot Head Mix] – (3:17)
3. "Suavemente" [Cibola Extended Club] – (5:35)
4. "Suavemente" [Dance Sugar Mix] – (4:19)

== Chart performance ==
"Suavamente" debuted at number 15 on the Hot Latin Tracks in April 1998 and jumped to number six a week later. On May 16, 1998, the song peaked at number one for six consecutive weeks. The song reached number 10 on the Billboard Top Latin Songs year-end chart of 1998. It became the second merengue song to reach number-one on Hot Latin Tracks after Juan Luis Guerra's "El Costo de la Vida".

Chart (1998–1999)	Peak position
U.S. Billboard Hot 100	84
U.S. Billboard Hot Latin Tracks	1
U.S. Billboard Latin Tropical/Salsa Airplay	1
U.S. Billboard Hot Dance Music/Maxi-Singles Sales	7
U.S. Billboard Dance Music/Club Play Singles	46

== Certifications ==
Region	Certification	Certified units/sales
Italy (FIMI) sales since 2009	Gold	50,000^{‡}
^{‡} Sales+streaming figures based on certification alone.

== Reception ==
"Suavemente" received generally positive reviews from critics. Terry Jenkins of AllMusic notes it as one of the highlights of the album of "wonderfully seductive" songs. In 1999, "Suavamente" received Lo Nuestro award for "Tropical Song of the Year" and two Billboard Latin Music awards for "Tropical/Salsa Hot Latin Track of the Year" and "Latin Dance Max-Single of the Year". Crespo responded to the success by stating that "It took me by surprise, although I had many years of experience, first in the chorus and then as a singer in Grupomanía. I believe that it's a challenge because I have to take on the responsibility to be consistent in my future projects."

== Scooter version ==
"Suavemente"

Single by Scooter

from the album Mind the Gap
- B-side: "Trance-Atlantic (Club Mix)"
- Released: 7 March 2005
- Recorded: 2004
- Length: 3:35
- Label: Sheffield Tunes
- Songwriters: Elvis Crespo; H. P. Baxxter; Rick J. Jordan; Jay Frog; Jens Thele
- Producers: Rick J. Jordan; Jay Frog; H.P. Baxxter

Scooter singles chronology
"One (Always Hardcore)" (2004)	"Suavemente" (2005)	"Hello! (Good to Be Back)" (2005)

In 2005, German group Scooter covered the song on their album Mind the Gap. It was released as the fourth and final single from the album. The music video for "Suavemente" features a tropical scene, with the three band members at the time (H. P. Baxxter, Rick J. Jordan, and Jay Frog) celebrating.

=== Track listings ===
CD single and digital download

1. "Suavemente" (Radio Edit) – 3:35
2. "Suavemente" (Extended) – 5:42
3. "Suavemente" (Club Mix) – 6:48
4. "Suavemente" (Original Club) – 3:30
5. "Trance-Atlantic" (Club Mix) – 4:05

12"

1. "Suavemente" (Extended) – 5:42
2. "Suavemente" (Club Mix) – 6:48

=== Chart performance ===
Chart (2005)	Peak position
Austria (Ö3 Austria Top 40)	27
Belgium (Ultratop 50 Flanders)	25
Belgium (Ultratip Bubbling Under Wallonia)	7
Denmark (Tracklisten)	10
European Hot 100 Singles (Billboard)	79
Germany (GfK)	22
Hungary (Single Top 40)	4
Hungary (Dance Top 40)	9
Netherlands (Single Top 100)	18
Spain (Promusicae)	17
Sweden (Sverigetopplistan)	58
Switzerland (Schweizer Hitparade)	39

== Other versions ==
- Brixx's version of the song features German singer Paul Cless reached number 28 the European Hot 100 Singles Chart.
- In 2017, American rapper Travis Scott referenced "Suavemente" on the remix of Puerto Rican singer Farruko's "Krippy Kush", which also features American rapper Nicki Minaj and Puerto Rican rappers Rvssian and Bad Bunny.
- Mexican-American rapper Snow Tha Product sampled the song's vocals and instrumental on her song of the same title.
- Bad Bunny paid tribute to the "Suavemente" music video on his song "Neverita" in 2022.

== See also ==
- List of number-one Billboard Hot Latin Tracks of 1998
- List of number-one Billboard Hot Tropical Songs from the 1990s
