= Con la Banda...El Recodo =

Studio album by Juan Gabriel with Banda el Recodo
- Released: December 8, 1998
- Recorded: 1998
- Genre: Banda
- Label: RCA Records
- Producer: Juan Gabriel

Juan Gabriel Compilations chronology
Por Mi Orgullo (1998)	Con la Banda...El Recodo (1998)	¡Románticos! (1999)

Banda el Recodo chronology
Con la Banda...El Recodo (1998)

Con la Banda...El Recodo (English With the band...El Recodo) is the twenty-fourth studio album by Mexican singer Juan Gabriel, released on December 8, 1998. Mexican Banda Sinaloense group Banda El Recodo provided the music for the album.

== Track listing ==
No.	Title	Length
1.	"El Sinaloense"	3:09
2.	"Te Acuerdas? Popurri: Te Dedico Esta Canción/Costumbres/La Más Querida/No Me Vuelvo a Enamorar/Fue Un Placer Conocerte/He Venido a Pedirte Perdón"	5:54
3.	"Me Gustas Mucho"	2:32
4.	"Huerfano Soy"	2:51
5.	"Ahora Con La Banda Popurri...: Te Voy a Olvidar/Ya Para Que/La Farsante"	5:02
6.	"Adorable Mentirosa"	2:39
7.	"Infidelidad"	3:07
8.	"Adiós al Amigo"	2:49
9.	"Don Germán Lizarraga"	0:12
10.	"Te Doy las Gracias"	2:19
11.	"Ya Me Voy"	2:19

== Charts ==
Chart (1999)	Peak position
US Top Latin Albums (Billboard)	6
US Regional Mexican Albums (Billboard)	1
US Heatseekers Albums (Billboard)	25

== Sales and certifications ==
Region	Certification	Certified units/sales
Mexico (AMPROFON)	Platinum+Gold	350,000^{^}
United States (RIAA)	2× Platinum (Latin)	200,000^{^}
^{^} Shipments figures based on certification alone.
