= List of awards and nominations received by Jenni Rivera =

Jenni Rivera awards and nominations
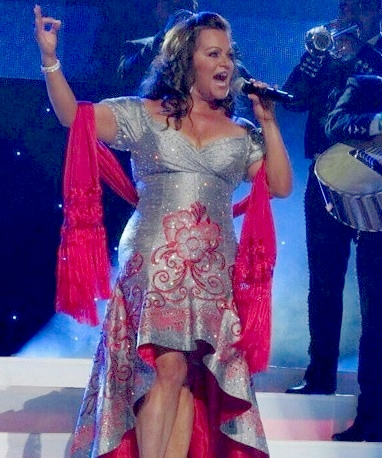
Awards and nominations
Award	Wins	Nominations
Billboard Music Awards	2	6
Billboard Latin Music Awards	22	35
Billboard Mexican Music Awards	11	14
BMI Latin Awards	1	1
Imagen Awards	1	1
Juventud Awards	5	13
Latin Grammy Awards	0	4
Lo Nuestro Awards	18	21
Oye! Awards	2	9
Premios de la Radio	7	7
Premios Tu Mundo	0	2

Totals (Note: Certain award groups do not simply award one winner. They acknowledge several different recipients, have runners-up, and have third place. Since this is a specific recognition and is different from losing an award, runner-up mentions are considered wins in this award tally. For simplification and to avoid errors, each award in this list has been presumed to have had a prior nomination.)
- Wins: 69
- Nominations: 113

Jenni Rivera was an American regional Mexican singer. She was nicknamed "La Diva de la Banda" for her work in the banda genre. She has garnered nominations and awards at some of the most prestigious award ceremonies such as the Latin Grammys, Oye! Awards, Billboard Music Awards, Latin Billboard Music Awards, and Lo Nuestro Awards.

She has released twelve studio albums over a 10 year-span of her career; Si Quieres Verme Llorar (1999), Reyna De Reynas (1999), Que Me Entierren Con la Banda (2000), Déjate Amar (2001), Se las Voy a Dar a Otro (2001), Homenaje a Las Grandes (2003), Parrandera, Rebelde y Atrevida (2005), Mi Vida Loca (2007), Jenni (2008), La Gran Señora (2009), Joyas Prestadas: Banda (2011), and Joyas Prestadas: Pop (2011), along with a posthumous studio album, Misión Cumplida (2023).

Rivera was nominated for 113 awards, with 69 wins. She won 22 Billboard Latin Music Awards, 18 Lo Nuestro Awards, 11 Billboard Mexican Music Awards, and one BMI Award.

== Billboard Music Awards ==
The Billboard Music Awards are awarded annually by the Billboard magazine in the United States. Rivera received two awards from six nominations posthumously.

Year	Nominee / work	Award	Result
2013	Jenni Rivera (herself)	Top Latin Artist	Won
2013	La Misma Gran Señora	Top Latin Album	Won
2013	Joyas Prestadas: Pop	Top Latin Album	Nominated
2013	Joyas Prestadas: Banda	Top Latin Album	Nominated
2014	Jenni Rivera (herself)	Top Latin Artist	Nominated
2014	1969 - Siempre, En Vivo Desde Monterrey, Parte 1	Top Latin Album	Nominated

== Billboard Latin Music Awards ==
The Billboard Latin Music Awards are awarded annually by the Billboard magazine in the United States. The Billboard awards are the Latin music industry's longest running and most prestigious award. Rivera received 22 awards from 35 nominations. 15 awards have been awarded posthumously.

Year	Nominee / work	Award	Result
2007	"De Contrabando"	Regional Mexican Airplay Song of the Year	Won
2008	Mi Vida Loca	Regional Mexican Album Of The Year	Won
2008	"Mirame"	Regional Mexican Airplay Song Of The Year	Won
2009	"Culpable O Inocente"	Hot Latin Song of the Year, Female	Nominated
2009	"Inolvidable"	Hot Latin Song of the Year, Female	Nominated
2009	Jenni (album)	Top Latin Album of the Year, Female	Won
2010	Jenni Rivera (herself)	Top Latin Albums Artist of the Year, Female	Won
2010	Jenni Rivera (herself)	Regional Mexican Airplay Artist of the Year, Female	Won
2012	Jenni Rivera (herself)	Female Songs, Artist of the Year	Nominated
2012	Jenni Rivera (herself)	Female Album, Artist of the Year	Nominated
2012	Jenni Rivera (herself)	Regional Mexican: Artist of the Year, Solo	Nominated
2013	Joyas Prestadas: Pop	Album of the Year	Won
2013	Jenni Rivera (herself)	Artist of the Year	Won
2013	Jenni Rivera (herself)	Regional Mexican Albums Artist of the Year, Solo	Won
2013	La Misma Gran Señora	Regional Mexican Album of the Year	Won
2013	Joyas Prestadas: Banda	Regional Mexican Album of the Year	Nominated
2013	Jenni Rivera (herself)	Regional Mexican Song Artist of the Year, Solo	Won
2013	Jenni Rivera (herself)	Latin Pop Albums of the Year, Solo	Won
2013	Joyas Prestadas: Pop	Latin Pop Album of the Year	Won
2013	Jenni Rivera (herself)	Albums Artist of the Year, Female	Won
2013	La Misma Gran Señora	Album of the Year	Won
2013	Jenni Rivera (herself)	Artist of the Year	Won
2014	La Misma Gran Señora	Regional Mexican Album of the Year	Won
2014	Jenni Rivera (herself)	Top Latin Albums Artist of the Year, Female	Won
2014	Jenni Rivera (herself)	Regional Mexican Albums Artist of the Year, Solo	Won
2014	Jenni Rivera (herself)	Artist of the Year	Nominated
2014	Jenni Rivera (herself)	Hot Latin Songs Artist of the Year, Female	Nominated
2014	La Misma Gran Señora	Top Latin Album of the Year	Nominated
2014	Joyas Prestadas: Pop	Top Latin Album of the Year	Nominated
2014	Joyas Prestadas: Pop	Latin Pop Album of the Year	Nominated
2014	Jenni Rivera (herself)	Latin Pop Albums Artist of the Year, Solo	Nominated
2015	Jenni Rivera (herself)	Hot Latin Songs Artist of the Year, Female	Nominated
2015	Jenni Rivera (herself)	Top Latin Albums Artist of the Year, Female	Won
2015	Jenni Rivera (herself)	Regional Mexican Albums Artist of the Year, Solo	Won
2015	1969 - Siempre, En Vivo Desde Monterrey, Parte 2	Regional Mexican Album of the Year	Nominated

== Billboard Mexican Music Awards ==
The Billboard Mexican Music Awards are awarded annually by the Billboard magazine in the United States. Rivera received eleven awards from fourteen nominations.

Year	Nominee / work	Award	Result
2011	Jenni Rivera (herself)	Star Award (Honorary award)	Won
2011	Jenni Rivera (herself)	Artist of the Year, Female	Won
2011	La Gran Señora en Vivo	Ranchero/Mariachi Album of the Year	Nominated
2011	"Él"	Ranchero/Mariachi Song of the Year	Nominated
2011	Jenni Rivera (herself)	Ranchero/Mariachi Artist of the Year	Nominated
2012	Jenni Rivera (herself)	Artist of the Year, Female	Won
2012	Joyas Prestadas: Banda	Banda Album of the Year	Won
2013	Jenni Rivera (herself)	Artist of the Year	Won
2013	Jenni Rivera (herself)	Artist of the Year, Female	Won
2013	Jenni Rivera (herself)	Digital Download Artist of the Year	Won
2013	La Misma Gran Señora	Album of the Year	Won
2013	Jenni Rivera (herself)	Artist of the Year, Albums	Won
2013	La Misma Gran Señora	Banda Album of the Year	Won
2013	Jenni Rivera (herself)	Banda Artist of the Year	Won

== Broadcast Music, Inc. Awards ==
Broadcast Music, Inc. (BMI) annually hosts award shows that honor the songwriters, composers and music publishers of the year's most-performed songs in the BMI catalog. Rivera received one award from one nomination.

Year	Nominee / work	Award	Result
2013	"La Gran Señora"	BMI Latin Music Award	Won

== Imagen Awards ==
The Imagen Awards are administered by the Imagen Foundation, an organization dedicated to encouraging and recognizing the positive portrayals of Latinos in the entertainment industry. Rivera has received one award from one nomination.

Year	Nominee / work	Award	Result
2012	Jenni Rivera	President's Award	Won

== Juventud Awards ==
The Juventud Awards are awarded annually by the television network Univision in the United States. Rivera received 5 awards out of 13 nominations, 4 were awarded posthumously.

Year	Nominee / work	Award	Result
2007	Jenni Rivera (herself)	Favorite Mexican Artist	Nominated
2008	Jenni Rivera (herself)	Favorite Mexican Artist	Won
2009	Jenni Rivera (herself)	My Favorite Concert	Nominated
2009	Jenni Rivera (herself)	Favorite Regional Mexican Artist	Nominated
2010	Jenni Rivera (herself)	Favorite Regional Mexican Artist	Nominated
2010	Jenni Rivera & Esteban Loaiza	Hottest Romance	Nominated
2012	Joyas Prestadas	Favorite Album	Nominated
2012	Jenni Rivera (herself)	Favorite Regional Mexican Artist	Nominated
2013	"La Misma Gran Senora"	Favorite Ringtone	Won
2013	Jenni Rivera (herself)	Favorite Pop Artist	Won
2013	Jenni Rivera (herself)	Favorite Regional Mexican Artist	Won
2013	Jenni Rivera (herself)	Most Talked About on Social Media	Won
2014	Filly Brown	Favorite Movie with Hispanic Actors and/or Director	Nominated

== Latin Grammy Awards ==
The Latin Grammy Awards are awarded annually by the Latin Academy of Recording Arts & Sciences in the United States. Rivera has received four nominations.

Year	Nominee / work	Award	Result
2002	Se las Voy a Dar a Otro	Best Banda Album	Nominated
2008	La Diva en Vivo	Best Ranchero Album	Nominated
2010	La Gran Señora	Best Ranchero Album	Nominated
2011	La Gran Señora en Vivo	Best Banda Album	Nominated

== Lo Nuestro Awards ==
The Lo Nuestro Awards are awarded annually by the television network Univision in the United States. Rivera has received eighteen awards from twenty-one nominations. By 2015 (nearly three years after her death), she has received nine accolades posthumously. In 2007, she won Regional Female Artist of the Year, repeating her success in that category eight times, the most in the awards history.

Year	Nominee / work	Award	Result
2003	Jenni Rivera (herself)	Best Female Artist	Nominated
2007	Jenni Rivera (herself)	Regional Mexican Female Artist of the Year	Nominated
2007	"De Contrabando"	Regional Mexican Song of the Year	Nominated
2007	Jenni Rivera (herself)	Banda Artist of the Year	Nominated
2008	Jenni Rivera (herself)	Regional Mexican Female Artist of the Year	Won
2009	Jenni Rivera (herself)	Regional Mexican Female Artist of the Year	Won
2009	Jenni Rivera (herself)	Banda Artist of the Year	Won
2010	Jenni Rivera (herself)	Regional Mexican Female Artist of the Year	Won
2011	Jenni Rivera (herself)	Regional Mexican Female Artist of the Year	Won
2011	Jenni Rivera (herself)	Ranchera Artist of the Year	Won
2012	Jenni Rivera (herself)	Ranchera Artist of the Year	Won
2012	Jenni Rivera (herself)	Regional Mexican Female Artist of the Year	Won
2013	Jenni Rivera (herself)	Artist of the Year	Won
2013	Jenni Rivera (herself)	Pop Female Artist of the Year	Won
2013	Jenni Rivera (herself)	Regional Mexican Female Artist of the Year	Won
2013	Joyas Prestadas: Pop	Pop Album of the Year	Won
2013	"A Cambio de Qué"	Pop Song of the Year	Won
2014	"Detrás de Mi Ventana"	Pop Song of the Year	Won
2014	Jenni Rivera (herself)	Pop Female Artist of the Year	Won
2014	Jenni Rivera (herself)	Regional Mexican Female Artist of the Year	Won
2015	Jenni Rivera (herself)	Regional Mexican Female Artist of the Year	Won

== Oye! Awards ==
Oye! Awards are presented annually by the Academia Nacional de la Música en México for outstanding achievements in the Mexican record industry. The equivalent of Premios Oye! (Spanish, meaning "Hear! Awards") to the United States's Grammy Awards. Rivera received awarded two awards posthumously from nine nominations.

Year	Nominee / work	Award	Result
2009	Jenni (album)	Popular Album of the Year	Nominated
2009	"Culpable ó Inocente"	Record of the Year	Nominated
2009	Jenni Rivera (herself)	Banda Artist of the Year	Nominated
2010	Jenni Rivera (herself)	Ranchera Artist of the Year	Nominated
2010	La Gran Señora	Popular Album of the Year	Nominated
2013	Jenni Rivera (herself)	Banda Artist of the Year	Won
2013	Jenni Rivera (herself)	Pop Female Artist of the Year	Nominated
2013	Joyas Prestadas: Banda	Popular Album of the Year	Won
2013	"La Misma Gran Señora"	Popular Song of the Year	Nominated

== Premios de la Radio ==
Premios de la Radio are presented by the Estrella TV for outstanding musicians in the Regional Mexican genre in the United States.

Year	Nominee / work	Award	Result
2011	Jenni Rivera (herself)	Female Artist of the Year	Won
2012	"Basta Ya"	Mejor Canción con Banda	Won
2012	Jenni Rivera (herself)	Female Artist of the Year	Won
2012	Joyas Prestadas: Banda	Banda Album of the Year	Won
2013	Jenni Rivera (herself)	Artist of the Year	Won
2013	No Llega el Olvido	Collaboration of the Year	Won
2014	Jenni Rivera (herself)	Female Artist of the Year	Won

== Premios Tu Mundo ==
Premios Tu Mundo is produced by Telemundo awarded annually from the American Airlines Arena in Miami, Florida.

Year	Nominee / work	Award	Result
2013	I Love Jenni	Best Reality Moment	Nominated
2013	Jenni Rivera - Filly Brown	Fandango Cine Presents Latino Pride in Hollywood	Nominated
