= Jenni Rivera discography =

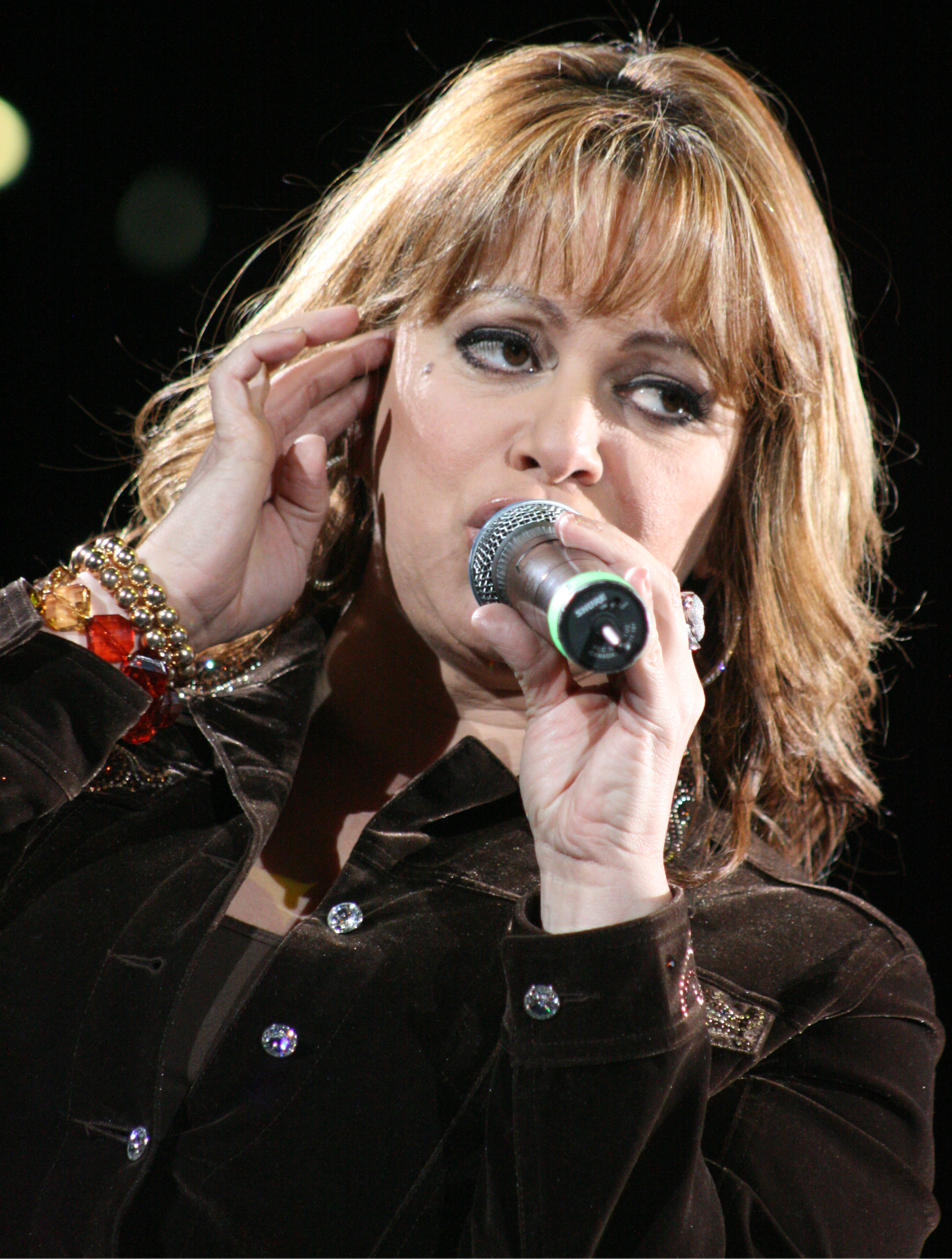
- Rivera performing in 2009
- Studio albums: 13
- Soundtrack albums: 1
- Live albums: 14
- Compilation albums: 6
- Singles: 42
- Reissues: 2

The discography of American singer Jenni Rivera consists of thirteen studio albums, two reissues, fourteen live albums, six compilation albums, one soundtrack album, and 42 singles. Rivera has been said to be the top-selling Regional Mexican female star of her generation by Billboard with more than 20 million albums sold.

== Albums ==
=== Studio albums ===
List of studio albums, with selected details, chart positions, and certifications
Title		Details	Chart positions					Certifications
Title		Details	US	US Latin	US Latin Pop	MEX Reg.	MEX	Certifications
Si Quieres Verme Llorar		Released: May 25, 1999; Label: Sony Music, Cintas Acuario	—	—	—	—	—	
Reyna De Reynas		Released: August 3, 1999; Label: Sony Music, Cintas Acuario	—	—	—	—	—	
Que Me Entierren con la Banda		Released: March 27, 2000; Label: Fonovisa	—	—	—	—	—	
Dejate Amar		Released: March 19, 2001; Label: Fonovisa	—	—	—	—	—	
Se las Voy a Dar a Otro		Released: December 5, 2001; Label: Fonovisa	—	—	—	—	—	
Homenaje a Las Grandes		Released: April 1, 2003; Label: Fonovisa	—	37	—	20	—	
Parrandera, Rebelde y Atrevida		Released: September 20, 2005; Label: Fonovisa	146	10	—	2	—	RIAA: 2× Platinum (Latin); AMPROFON: Gold
Mi Vida Loca		Released: March 20, 2007; Label: Fonovisa	162	2	—	1	—	RIAA: Platinum (Latin)
Jenni		Released: September 9, 2008; Label: Universal Latin Entertainment	31	1	—	1	27	AMPROFON: Platinum+Gold
La Gran Señora		Released: December 1, 2009; Label: Fonovisa	118	2	—	1	9	RIAA: Platinum (Latin); AMPROFON: 2× Platinum+Gold
Joyas Prestadas	Pop	Released: November 21, 2011; Label: Fonovisa	51	1	1	—	1	RIAA: 2× Platinum (Latin); AMPROFON: 4× Platinum+Gold
Joyas Prestadas	Banda	Released: November 21, 2011; Label: Fonovisa	74	2	—	1	3	RIAA: 2× Platinum (Latin); AMPROFON: 3× Platinum
Misión Cumplida		Released: June 30, 2023; Label: Sony Music Latin; Formats: Digital download, streaming, CD, LP	—	—	—	—	—	RIAA: Gold (Latin)
"—" denotes releases that did not chart or were not released.

=== Live albums ===
List of live albums, with selected details, chart positions, and certifications
Title	Details	Chart positions				Certifications
Title	Details	US	US Latin	MEX Reg.	MEX	Certifications
Besos y Copas Desde Hollywood	Released: September 12, 2006	— (Note: Besos y Copas Desde Hollywood did not enter the Billboard 200 chart, but peaked at number 27 on the Heatseekers Albums chart.)	19	5	—	
En Vivo Desde Hollywood	Released: April 4, 2006	— (Note: En Vivo Desde Hollywood did not enter the Billboard 200 chart, but peaked at number 50 on the Heatseekers Albums chart.)	39	13	—	
La Diva en Vivo	Released: November 6, 2007	—	33	11	—	
La Gran Señora en Vivo	Released: November 22, 2010	—	8	2	—	AMPROFON: Platinum
1969 – Siempre, En Vivo Desde Monterrey, Parte 1	Released: December 3, 2013	25	1	1	2	RIAA: Platinum (Latin); AMPROFON: Platinum+Gold
1969 – Siempre, En Vivo Desde Monterrey, Parte 2	Released: July 1, 2014	27	1	1	—	
1 Vida – 3 Historias: Metamorfosis – Despedida de Culiacán – Jenni Vive 2013	Released: December 2, 2014	—	1	1	—	
Paloma Negra Desde Monterrey	Released: September 30, 2016	178	1	1	—	
"—" denotes releases that did not chart or were not released.

=== Compilation albums ===
List of compilation albums, with selected details, chart positions, and certifications
Title	Details	Chart positions				Certifications
Title	Details	US	US Latin	MEX Reg.	MEX	Certifications
Simplemente La Mejor	Released: September 28, 2004	198	29	20	—	
La Misma Gran Señora	Released: December 11, 2012	38	1	1	1	RIAA: 2× Platinum (Latin); AMPROFON: 2× Platinum+Gold
La Más Completa Colección	Released: December 18, 2012	38	1	1	7	AMPROFON: Platinum
Ni Tu Esposa, Ni Tu Amante, Ni Tu Amiga	Released: July 2, 2015; Label: Cintas Acuario	—	—	—	—	
Angel Baby	Released: December 5, 2017	—	—	—	—	
Las Cuentas Claras	Released: September 28, 2018	—	—	—	—	
"—" denotes releases that did not chart or were not released.

=== Reissues ===
List of re-releases, with selected details and chart positions
Title	Details	Chart positions	
Title	Details	US Latin	MEX Reg.
Jenni: Super Deluxe	Released: July 28, 2009	13	9
Joyas Prestadas: Pop Deluxe	Released: August 28, 2012	—	—
"—" denotes releases that did not chart or were not released.

=== Soundtrack albums ===
List of soundtrack albums, with selected details and chart positions
Title	Details	Charts	
Title	Details	MEX Reg.	US Latin
Mariposa de Barrio (Soundtrack De La Serie)	Released: March 5, 2021; Label: Jenni Rivera Enterprises	5	31
"—" denotes releases that did not chart or were not released.

== Music videos ==
As lead artist
Title	Year	Album	Director
La Chacalosa	1997	Poco a Poco	
La Maestra	1997	La Maestra (reissued as No Vuelvo Ni De Chiste)	Danny Suarez
Reina de Reinas	1999	Reina de Reinas	Danny Suarez
Que Me Entierren Con La Banda (ft. Lupillo Rivera)	2000	Que Me Entierren Con La Banda	Danny Suarez
Las Malandrinas	2000	Que Me Entierren Con La Banda	Danny Suarez
Una Noche Me Embriagué	2001	Déjate Amar	Jesús Soltero Rodriguez
Querida Socia	2001	Déjate Amar	Jesús Soltero Rodriguez
Se Las Voy A Dar A Otro	2001	Se Las Voy A Dar A Otro	Jesús Soltero Rodriguez
A Escondidas	2003	Homenaje A Las Grandes	Jesús Soltero Rodriguez
A Escondidas (Versión Norteña)	2003	Homenaje A Las Grandes	Jesús Soltero Rodriguez
La Papa Sin Catsup	2003	Homenaje A Las Grandes	Betty Kepler
Amiga Si Lo Ves	2004	Simplemente La Mejor	
De Contrabando	2006	Parrandera, Rebelde y Atrevida	
Que Me Vas A Dar	2006	Parrandera, Rebelde y Atrevida	
Mírame	2007	Mi Vida Loca	J. Gómez & B. del Villar
Inolvidable	2007	Mi Vida Loca	
Ahora Que Estuviste Lejos	2007	Mi Vida Loca	
Culpable O Inocente	2008	Jenni	
¿Por Qué No Le Calas?	2009	La Gran Señora	José Serrano
Yo Soy Una Mujer	2009	La Gran Señora	
Basta Ya (Banda)	2011	Joyas Prestadas (Banda)	Ricardo Moreno
Basta Ya (Pop)	2011	Joyas Prestadas (Pop)	Ricardo Moreno
Dos Botellas de Mezcal	2013	1969 - Siempre en Vivo Desde Monterrey Parte 1	
Resulta (En Vivo)	2015	1969 - Siempre en Vivo Desde Monterrey Parte 2	Pedro Rivera
Aparentemente Bien	2019	Misión Cumplida	Marlon Villar
Engañemoslo	2020	Misión Cumplida	Marlon Villar
Quisieran Tener Mi Lugar	2020	Misión Cumplida	Lino Quintana
Motivos	2021	Misión Cumplida	Marlon Villar & Lino Quintana
Misión Cumplida	2022	Misión Cumplida	Marlon Villar
Pedacito de Mi (ft. Chiquis & Jacquie Rivera)	2023	Misión Cumplida	Marlon Villar
Ovarios (Banda)	2024	Non-album single	

== Singles ==
=== As lead artist ===
List of singles as lead artist, with selected chart positions, and album name
Title	Year	Peak chart positions			Certifications	Album
Title	Year	US Latin	MEX Reg.	MEX	Certifications	Album
"Querida Socia"	2001	—	18	—		Dejate Amar
"Angel Baby"	2002	—	16	—		Se las Voy a Dar a Otro
"A Escondidas"	2003	—	23	—		Homenaje a Las Grandes
"Juro Que Nunca Volveré"	2004	—	37	—		Homenaje a Las Grandes
"Amiga Si Lo Ves"	2005	—	35	—		Simplemente... La Mejor
"Que Me Vas a Dar"	2005	31	7	—		Parrandera, Rebelde y Atrevida
"De Contrabando"	2006	14	1	—		Parrandera, Rebelde y Atrevida
"No Vas a Creer"	2006	49	13	—		Parrandera, Rebelde y Atrevida
"Besos y Copas"	2006	46	10	—		Besos y Copas Desde Hollywood
"La Sopa del Bebe"	2007	—	23	—		Mi Vida Loca
"Mirame"	2007	19	8	—		Mi Vida Loca
"Ahora Que Estuviste Lejos"	2008	9	3	—		Mi Vida Loca
"Inolvidable"	2008	13	5	—		Mi Vida Loca
"Culpable o Inocente"	2008	15	4	16		Jenni
"Chuper Amigos"	2009	37	19	—		Jenni
"Tu Camisa Puesta"	2009	24	13	28		Jenni
"Ovarios"	2009	22	13	—		Jenni: Super Deluxe
"Ya lo Se"	2009	16	7	—		La Gran Señora
"Por Que No le Calas"	2010	46	22	28		La Gran Señora
"Dejame Volver Contigo"	2010	—	31	50		La Gran Señora
"Amarga Navidad"	2011	—	25	—		La Gran Señora
"La Gran Señora"	2011	44	23	—		La Gran Señora
"¡Basta Ya!"	2011	14	6	3		Joyas Prestadas
"A Cambio de Que"	2012	49	21	21		Joyas Prestadas
"A Que No le Cuentas"	2012	37	—	—		Joyas Prestadas
"Así Fue"	2012	33	—	—		Joyas Prestadas
"Como Tu Mujer"	2012	28	—	—		Joyas Prestadas
"Detrás de Mi Ventana"	2012	12	6	30		Joyas Prestadas
"La Misma Gran Señora"	2012	9	6	5		La Misma Gran Señora
"Dos Botellas de Mezcal"	2013	27	—	5		1969 - Siempre, En Vivo Desde Monterrey, Parte 1
"Amiga Si Lo Ves"	2013	—	—	—		1969 - Siempre, En Vivo Desde Monterrey, Parte 1
"Resulta"	2014	14	2	—		1969 - Siempre, En Vivo Desde Monterrey, Parte 1
"Paloma Negra"	2016	—	—	38		Paloma Negra Desde Monterrey
"Sufriendo a Solas"	2016	—	—	—		Paloma Negra Desde Monterrey
"La Mentada Contestada"	2016	—	—	—		Paloma Negra Desde Monterrey
"Aparentemente Bien"	2019	32	7	2	RIAA: Platinum (Latin)	Misión Cumplida
"Engañémoslo"	2020	—	6	13	RIAA: Gold (Latin)	Misión Cumplida
"Quisieran Tener Mi Lugar"	2020	—	—	—		Misión Cumplida
"Motivos"	2021	—	27	—		Misión Cumplida
"Misión Cumplida"	2022	—	—	—		Misión Cumplida

=== As featured artist ===
List of singles as featured artist, showing year released and album name
Title	Year	Album
"Mami Te Quiero" (Down AKA Kilo featuring Jenni Rivera)	2004	Jefes & Bosses
"Cosas del Amor" (regional version) (Olga Tañón featuring Jenni Rivera)	2007	Exitos en 2 Tiempos
"Algo Sucedió" (banda version) (El Gringo featuring Jenni Rivera)	2007	Algo Sucedió
"Algo Sucedió" (pop version) (El Gringo featuring Jenni Rivera)	2007	Algo Sucedió
"El Amor" (regional version) (Tito El Bambino featuring Jenni Rivera	2009	El Patrón: La Victoria
"Ni Rosas Ni Juguetes" (banda version) (Paulina Rubio featuring Jenni Rivera)	2009	Non-album singles
"Lo Mejor de Mi Vida Eres Tú" (banda version) (Ricky Martin featuring Jenni Rivera)	2011	Non-album singles
"Ajustando Cuentas" (Diana Reyes featuring Jenni Rivera)	2011	Ajustando Cuentas
"El Destino" (La Original Banda El Limón De Salvador Lizárraga featuring Jenni Rivera)	2011	El Primer Lugar
"Eternamente Bella" (Alejandra Guzman featuring Moderatto and Jenni Rivera)	2011	20 Años de Éxitos En Vivo Con Moderatto
"Quisieran Tener Mi Lugar" (Chiquis Rivera featuring Jenni Rivera)	2018	Entre Botellas
"Que Me Entierren Cantando" (Lupillo Rivera featuring Jenni Rivera)	2020	Borracho De Primera

== Other charted songs ==
List of other charted songs, with selected chart positions, and album name
Title	Year	Chart positions	Album
Title	Year	MEX Reg.	Album
"El Que Hoy Está en Tu Lugar"	2023	8	Misión Cumplida

== Guest appearances ==
List of non-single guest appearances, with other performing artists, showing year released and album name
Title	Year	Other performer(s)	Album
"Taquito de Ojo"	2003	Akwid	Proyecto Akwid
"Nada Gano con Negarlo"	2004	Don Francisco	Mi Homenaje Grande a la Musica Norteña
"Cosas del Amor"	2007	Olga Tañón	Exitos en 2 Tiempos
"Algo Sucedió"	2007	El Gringo	Algo Sucedió
"El Amor"	2009	Tito El Bambino	El Patrón: La Victoria
"El Destino"	2010	La Original Banda el Limón de Salvador Lizárraga	Las Número Uno
"Eternamente Bella"	2011	Alejandra Guzmán	20 Años de Éxitos En Vivo con Moderatto
