= Reyna de Reynas =

Reina de Reinas

Studio album by Jenni Rivera
- Released: August 3, 1999
- Genre: Pacific Norteño
- Label: Sony Music/Cintas Acuario

Jenni Rivera chronology
| Si Quieres Verme Llorar (1999) | Reina de Reinas (1999) | Que Me Entierren Con la Banda (2000) |

Reina de Reinas ("Queen of Queens") is the second major label studio album released by regional Mexican singer Jenni Rivera on August 3, 1999, by Sony Music. It was re-released by Cinta Acuario in 2008.

== Track listing ==
| No. | Title | Writer(s) | Length |
|---|---|---|---|
| 1. | "Reina de Reinas" | Pedro Rivera | 03:05 |
| 2. | "El Desquite" | Mario Saucedo Bucio | 03:08 |
| 3. | "El Orgullo de Mi Padre" | Jenni Rivera | 02:59 |
| 4. | "Popurrí de Chelo" | D.A.R | 06:13 |
| 5. | "Los Traficantes" | Paulino Vargas Jiménez | 03:40 |
| 6. | "La Reina es el Rey" | Gregorio Hernández | 04:04 |
| 7. | "La Matrina (ft. Las Voces del Rancho)" | Consuelo Castro | 03:08 |
| 8. | "El Bato Gacho" | Magdalena Oliva | 02:40 |
| 9. | "La Maestra del Contrabando" | Jenni Rivera | 03:54 |
| 10. | "Saludame a la Tuya" | Manuel Eduardo Toscano | 02:34 |
| 11. | "Las Cachanillas" | Jenni Rivera | 02:49 |
