= Déjate Amar =

Déjate Amar may refer to:

- Déjate Amar (album), 2001 album by Jenni Rivera
- "Déjate Amar", 1982 song by Guillermo Dávila
- "Déjate Amar", 1994 song by La India from the album Dicen Que Soy
- "Déjate Amar", 2005 song by Intocable
- "Déjate Amar", 2013 song by Yandel from the album De Líder a Leyenda
