= Mariposa de Barrio =

American telenovela

- Genre: Telenovela
- Created by: Rossana Negrín
- Based on: Unbreakable: My Story, My Way by Jenni Rivera
- Written by: Ilay Eskinazi; Alejandro Vergara; Sergio Mendoza
- Directed by: Luis Manzo; Ricardo Schawarz; Nicolás Di Blasi
- Creative director: Erasmo Colón
- Starring: See list
- Opening theme: "Mariposa de Barrio" by Jenni Rivera
- Country of origin: United States
- Original language: Spanish
- No. of seasons: 1
- No. of episodes: 91

Production
- Executive producers: Carmen Cecilia Urbaneja; David Posada; Carlos Lamus
- Producers: Rosie Rivera; Ernesto Cabrera; Aimeé Godínez
- Cinematography: Arturo Silva
- Editor: Ellery Albarrán
- Camera setup: Multi-camera
- Production companies: Telemundo Studios; Jenni Rivera Enterprises

Original release
- Network: Telemundo
- Release: June 27 – November 6, 2017

Related
- Su nombre era Dolores, la Jenn que yo conocí

Jenni Rivera: Mariposa de Barrio, la serie, or simply Mariposa de Barrio, is an American biographical telenovela based on the autobiography Unbreakable: My Story, My Way authored by Jenni Rivera before her death and was published posthumously in July 2013. It stars Angélica Celaya as the titular character, and it started airing on American broadcast channel Telemundo on June 27, 2017, and concluded on November 6, 2017.

The first season of the series was made available on Netflix on December 15, 2017, with other regions streaming the series from January 1, 2021.

== Cast ==
=== Main characters ===
- Angélica Celaya as Jenni Rivera
- Gabriel Porras as Pedro Rivera
- Rosalinda Rodríguez as Rosa Saavedra de Rivera
- Samadhi Zendejas as Jenni Rivera (13-25 Years old)
- Tony Garza as José Trinidad Marín
- Regina Orquín as Jenni Rivera (9-12 Years old)
- Enrique Montaño as Pedro "Pete" Rivera (19-30 Years old)
- Adrián Carvajal as Pedro "Pete" Rivera (31-48 Years old)
- Adriano Zendejas as Gustavo Rivera (17-28 Years old)
- Emmanuel Morales as Gustavo Rivera (29-46 Years old)
- Xavier Ruvalcaba as Lupillo Rivera (15-22 Years old)
- Raúl Sandoval as Lupillo Rivera (23-40 Years old)
- Mauricio Novoa as Juan Rivera (15-20 Years old)
- Uriel del Toro as Juan Rivera (21-34 Years old)
- Ana Wolfermann as Rosie Rivera (12-17 Years old)
- Stephanie Arcila as Rosie Rivera (18-31 Years old)
- Vanessa Pose as Chiquis Rivera (14-27 Years old)
- Alma Matrecito as Jackie Rivera (13-23 Years old)
- Pepe Gámez as Juan Manuel López
- Christopher Millán as Fernando Ramírez
- Ricardo Kleinbaum as Esteban Loaiza Vega
- Julio César Otero as Trinidad "Mikey" Marín Rivera (14-21 Years old)
- Gabriela Sepúlveda as Jenicka López Rivera (12-15 Years old)
- Gael Sánchez as Juan Ángel “Johnny” López Rivera (8-11 Years old)

=== Recurring characters ===
- Gabriela González as Ramona Suárez (28-45 Years old)
- Paloma Márquez as Patricia Benitez (26-43 Years old)
- Laura Vieira as Brenda Martínez (20-34 Years old)
- Diana Marcoccia as Gladyz
- Yrahid Leylanni as Fabiola Llerandi
- Sonia Noemí as Consuelo Ramírez
- Ronald Reyes as Gabriel Vásquez
- Carlos Guerrero as Pete Salgado
- Alexis Venegas as Adán Terriquez
- Eduardo Antonio as Jaime Terriquez
- Tony Vela as Pepe Garza
- Jeyson Rodríguez as Jacob Yebale
- Oliver Gutiérrez as Jorge Sánchez
- Julio Ocampo as Pedro Rivera (17-34 Years old)
- Adriana Bermúdez as Rosa Rivera (15-32 Years old)
- Braulio Hernández as Pedro Rivera Saavedra (14-17 Years old)
- John Díaz as Gustavo Rivera (12-15 Years old)
- Noah Rico as Lupillo Rivera (6-9 Years old)
- Nicholas Forero as Lupillo Rivera (11-13 Years old)
- Martín Fajardo as Juan Rivera (5-7 Years old)
- Kevin Cabrera as Juan Rivera (9-14 Years old)
- Mauricio Novoa as Juan Rivera (15-20 Years old)
- Orlyana Rondón as Rosie Rivera (4-7 Years old)
- Luz de Sol Padula as Rosie Rivera (8-11 Years old)
- Maya Idarraga as Chiquis Rivera (2-3 Years old)
- Paola Real as Chiquis Rivera (4-7 Years old)
- Dariana Fustes as Chiquis Rivera (8-13 Years old)
- Fabiana Lion as Jacquelin Melina Marín Rivera (4-6 Years old)
- Samantha Lopez as Jacquelin Melina Marín Rivera (9-12 Years old)
- David Hernández as Trinidad Marín Rivera (5-6 Years old)
- Miguel Cubillos as Trinidad Marín Rivera (7-10 Years old)
- Christian Alfonso as Trinidad Marín Rivera (11-13 Years old)
- Isabela Hernández as Jenicka López Rivera (3-4 Years old)
- Giana Deftereos as Jenicka López Rivera (5-7 Years old)
- Daniel García as Jhonny Ángel López Rivera (4-7 Years old)
- Thamara Aguilar as Ramona Suárez (18-27 Years old)

=== Special guest stars ===
- Don Francisco as himself
- Charytín Goyco as herself

== Production ==
The series is created by the Venezuelan writer Rossana Negrín, based on the autobiography Unbreakable: My Story, My Way written by Jenni Rivera published in July 2013. It is the only authorized version on the life of Rivera, based also on some testimonies published in the books "My Broken Pieces: Mending the Wounds From Sexual Abuse Through Faith, Family and Love" written by her sister, Rosie Rivera and "Forgiveness" written by Chiquis Rivera, her daughter. 90 episodes were ordered for broadcast.

== Episodes ==
No.	Title	Original release date	US viewers (millions)
Part 1
1	"El sueño de Jenni"	June 27, 2017	1.63
2	"Sobredosis"	June 28, 2017	1.43
3	"Custodia en un hilo"	June 29, 2017	1.43
4	"El debut de Jenni"	June 30, 2017	1.07
5	"Machista arrepentido"	July 3, 2017	1.03
6	"La idea de ser cantante"	July 4, 2017	1.01
7	"Carrusel de emociones"	July 5, 2017	1.28
8	"Decisión insospechada"	July 6, 2017	1.18
9	"Jenni regresa con Trino"	July 7, 2017	1.00
10	"Malditos celos"	July 10, 2017	1.20
11	"La segunda es la vencida"	July 11, 2017	1.23
12	"Noticia bomba para Trino"	July 12, 2017	1.28
13	"Dolores de parto"	July 13, 2017	1.22
14	"Niñez interrumpida"	July 14, 2017	1.29
15	"El secreto de Jenni"	July 17, 2017	1.34
16	"Trino apuesta a las dos"	July 18, 2017	1.49
17	"Paternidad negada"	July 19, 2017	1.32
18	"El futuro amoroso de Jenni"	July 20, 2017	1.33
19	"El amor todo lo puede"	July 21, 2017	1.29
20	"Trino no cambia"	July 24, 2017	1.48
21	"Llamada de emergencia"	July 25, 2017	N/A
22	"Sabor a fama"	July 26, 2017	1.49
23	"Oportunidad para Lupillo"	July 27, 2017	1.38
Part 2
24	"Jenni mide su talento"	July 28, 2017	1.40
25	"Difícil comienzo"	July 31, 2017	1.20
26	"Desgracia para Los Rivera"	August 1, 2017	1.48
27	"Jenni apuesta de nuevo al amor"	August 2, 2017	1.25
28	"Jenni pone los frenos"	August 3, 2017	1.23
29	"La radio le da la espalda"	August 4, 2017	1.13
30	"Trino, “padre protector”"	August 7, 2017	1.68
31	"Sin suerte en el amor"	August 8, 2017	1.60
32	"Se abre una puerta para Jenni"	August 9, 2017	1.58
33	"Jenni la pasa mal"	August 10, 2017	1.50
34	"A Jenni le roban la dignidad"	August 11, 2017	1.48
35	"Matrimonio forzado"	August 14, 2017	1.59
36	"Abuso al descubierto"	August 15, 2017	1.52
37	"Jenni quiere matar a Trino"	August 16, 2017	1.76
38	"Ansiedad por su arresto"	August 17, 2017	1.61
39	"Matrimonio arruinado"	August 18, 2017	1.35
40	"Jenni busca pruebas"	August 21, 2017	1.77
41	"Jenni confirma el engaño"	August 22, 2017	1.68
42	"Jugosa oferta"	August 23, 2017	1.58
43	"Jenni, profesional de la canción"	August 25, 2017	1.66
44	"Jenni se hace famosa"	August 28, 2017	1.63
45	"Jenni nominada al Latin Grammy"	August 29, 2017	1.70
46	"Infieles"	August 30, 2017	1.54
47	"A las puertas del divorcio"	August 31, 2017	1.39
48	"Jenni busca otro mánager"	September 1, 2017	1.25
49	"Nacida para triunfar"	September 4, 2017	1.45
50	"Rosie cae en depresión"	September 6, 2017	1.58
51	"Jenni tiene un nuevo amor"	September 7, 2017	1.59
52	"Los Rivera conocen a Fernie"	September 8, 2017	1.39
53	"Jenni piensa como empresaria"	September 11, 2017	1.53
54	"Pedro aún quiere a Rosa"	September 12, 2017	1.38
55	"Una vida juntos"	September 13, 2017	1.34
56	"Machista desenmascarado"	September 14, 2017	1.33
57	"Jenni desacredita a una colega"	September 15, 2017	1.31
58	"Jenni en el ojo de huracán"	September 18, 2017	1.43
59	"Jenni se desquita"	September 19, 2017	1.49
60	"“Divina”, por una buena causa"	September 20, 2017	1.44
61	"Rosie desaparece"	September 21, 2017	1.37
62	"Todos van por Trino"	September 22, 2017	1.18
63	"Denuncian al violador"	September 25, 2017	1.33
64	"Acorralan a Trino"	September 26, 2017	1.38
65	"Ruptura"	September 27, 2017	1.49
66	"El FBI detrás de Trino"	September 28, 2017	1.51
67	"Trino insiste en su inocencia"	September 29, 2017	1.26
68	"Chiquis, testigo clave"	October 2, 2017	1.40
69	"La defensa de Trino"	October 3, 2017	1.41
70	"Trino en el estrado"	October 4, 2017	1.44
71	"Fernie es otro"	October 5, 2017	1.40
72	"Otra decepción para Jenni"	October 6, 2017	1.29
73	"Alucinaciones"	October 9, 2017	1.54
74	"La disquera en disputa"	October 11, 2017	1.48
75	"Alegato final"	October 12, 2017	1.61
76	"La generosidad de Jenni"	October 13, 2017	N/A
77	"Más sufrimiento para Jenni"	October 16, 2017	1.44
78	"Flaquea la carrera de Jenni"	October 17, 2017	N/A
79	"La ira de Pedro"	October 18, 2017	1.39
80	"Juegan a ser coyotes"	October 19, 2017	1.44
81	"Microfonazo en defensa propia"	October 20, 2017	1.39
82	"La conquista"	October 23, 2017	N/A
83	"Amor a todas luces"	October 24, 2017	N/A
84	"Jenni rompe con Esteban"	October 25, 2017	N/A
85	"Jenni, inflexible"	October 27, 2017	1.25
86	"Proyecto:“La Gran Señora”"	October 30, 2017	1.41
87	"Crece la familia Rivera"	October 31, 2017	N/A
88	"Sorpresa para Jenni"	November 1, 2017	1.29
89	"Amenaza de secuestro"	November 2, 2017	1.52
90	"Enredos de familia"	November 3, 2017	1.48
91	"Ovación y despedida"	November 6, 2017	1.79

== Music ==
Mariposa de Barrio (Soundtrack de la Serie)

Soundtrack album by Jenni Rivera
- Released: March 5, 2021
- Genres: Regional Mexican; banda
- Length: 52:09
- Language: Spanish
- Label: Sony Latin
- Producers: Juan Rivera; Rosie Rivera; Lino Quintana Pineda

Jenni Rivera chronology
Las Cuentas Claras (2018)	Mariposa de Barrio (Soundtrack de la Serie) (2021)	Misión Cumplida (2023)

An official soundtrack album for the series was released on March 5, 2021. It peaked at number five on the Billboard Regional Mexican Albums chart, earning 2,000 album-equivalent units within its first week, marking Rivera's first charting since 2016.

=== Track listing ===
Mariposa de Barrio (Soundtrack de la Serie) track listing
No.	Title	Length
1.	"Mariposa de Barrio"	4:30
2.	"Besos y Copas"	3:13
3.	"Con Él"	3:30
4.	"Culpable o Inocente"	3:37
5.	"Dama Divina"	2:22
6.	"De Contrabando"	3:22
7.	"Inolvidable"	2:38
8.	"La Primera Piedra"	3:21
9.	"Amiga Si Lo Ves"	5:13
10.	"Mirame"	3:25
11.	"Mudanzas"	3:25
12.	"No Me Pregunten por Él"	3:01
13.	"Que Me Vas a Dar Si Vuelvo"	3:27
14.	"Se las Voy a Dar a Otro"	3:27
15.	"Ya Lo Se"	3:31
Total length:		52:09

=== Charts ===
Chart performance for Mariposa de Barrio (Soundtrack de la Serie)
Chart (2021)	Peak position
US Regional Mexican Albums (Billboard)	5
US Top Latin Albums (Billboard)	31

== Reception ==
=== Ratings ===
Viewership and ratings per season of Mariposa de Barrio
Season	Timeslot (ET)	Episodes	First aired		Last aired		Avg. viewers (millions)
Season	Timeslot (ET)	Episodes	Date	Viewers (millions)	Date	Viewers (millions)	Avg. viewers (millions)
1	Mon–Fri 8:00 p.m.	91	June 27, 2017	1.63	November 6, 2017	1.79	TBD

=== Awards and nominations ===
Year	Award	Category	Nominated	Result
2018	International Emmy Award	Best Non-English Language U.S. Primetime Program	Mariposa de Barrio	Nominated
