= Angel Baby (album) =

Compilation album by Jenni Rivera
- Released: December 5, 2017
- Genre: Mariachi
- Length: 41:00
- Language: Spanish
- Label: Cintas Acuario
- Producer: Pedro Rivera

Jenni Rivera chronology
Paloma Negra Desde Monterrey (2016)	Angel Baby (2017)	Las Cuentas Claras (2018)

Angel Baby is a posthumous compilation album by regional Mexican singer Jenni Rivera, released on December 5, 2017, it was released on streaming services and also released on a limited CD edition, exclusively released in the United States.

== Tracklist ==
No.	Title	Writer(s)	Length
1.	"Ahora Vengo a Verte"	Antonio Palacios	3:24
2.	"Amiga Si Lo Ves"	Yaredt Leon	4:32
3.	"Angel Baby"	Rose Hamlin	3:31
4.	"Con Los Ojos Cerrados"	Gloria Trevi	4:03
5.	"De Parte De Quien"	Federico Méndez	2:31
6.	"Al Ver Que Te Vas (Diferencias Sociales)"	Jaime Ignacio Penunuri	2:54
7.	"Hacer El Amor Con Otro"	Consuelo Arango, Marella Cayre	4:02
8.	"La Hija De Nadie"	Felipe Jiménez López	2:55
9.	"No Me Queda Más"	Ricky Vela	3:28
10.	"Papa Sin Ketchup"	Eduardo Cesar Malo Lazcano	3:27
11.	"Por Un Amor"	Gilberto Parra	3:47
12.	"Where Did Our Love Go?"	Holland-Dozier-Holland	2:56
Total length:			41:00
