= Jenni Rivera Fashion =

Web-based fashion boutique

- Type: Fashion Boutique
- Industry: Fashion
- Founded: Los Angeles, California, U.S. (November 9, 2013)
- Founder: Jenni Rivera
- Area served: Brea, California(physical); United States(web)
- Key people: Jenni Rivera (CEO) [deceased] Jacqie Rivera (Acting CEO)
- Products: Music and fashion
- Website: Jenni Rivera Boutique

Jenni Rivera Fashion is a South California and web-based fashion boutique. The company's CEO is Jacqie Rivera, the daughter of deceased Hispanic singer Jenni Rivera.

== History ==
The boutique was officially opened to the public on November 9, 2013 in Panorama City, California. The idea and initial planning was done by Jenni Rivera before she died in December 2012, and ultimately taken over by her sister Rosie Rivera and other family members.

The boutique features designs and styles of American texture and exotic clothing styles which became Jenni Rivera's trademark on stage. The boutique features clothes with the singer's initials, J-R, an exclusive line of Jenni jeans, and Jenni Rivera perfume. The store also carries a complete line of cosmetics like white and pink lip gloss, makeup, powder and eye shadows with her name on them. Jenni Rivera's albums are also available at the boutique. The boutique was located in the 8500 block of Van Nuys Boulevard in Panorama City, California.

In August 2022, it was announced that the boutique will close temporarily amid an 80,000 USD theft that left the company bankrupt. Chiquis Rivera, daughter of Jenni Rivera, said that the company plans to reopen again in a new location.

The new location opened in November 2022 at Brea Mall, in Brea, CA.
