= A Cambio de Que =

Song by Xavier Santos Córtes
- Genre: Latin
- Songwriter: Xavier Santos Córtes

"A Cambio de Que" (transl. In Exchange for What) is a song written by Xavier Santos Córtes and first recorded in 1983 by Mexican band Los Diablos. American born singer Marisela sang a version modified to reflect a female voice in her studio album Completamente Tuya. The song has been covered by several artists which have ranked on the music charts. Latin pop band Corvo covered the song in 1999 which reached number 18 on the Hot Latin Songs chart in the United States. American singer Huey Dunbar recorded "A Cambio de Que" on his debut studio album Yo Si Me Enamoré (2001). This version peaked at number 16 on the Tropical Songs chart. Mexican duranguense band Alacranes Musical covered the song on the album of the same name in 2004 which reached number 25 on the Regional Mexican Airplay chart.

== Los Diablos original version ==
"A Cambio de Que"

Song by Los Diablos

from the album Endiabladamente Románticos
- Released: 1983
- Recorded: 1983
- Studio: GES Records
- Genre: Latin
- Label: GES Records Girol
- Songwriter: Xavier Santos Córtes
- Producer: Los Diablos

In 1983, the U.S. based band Los Diablos took the airwaves by storm with the release for the first time of "A Cambio de Que" a single part of the album Endiabladamente Románticos. This was their second studio album with their new lead singer Juan Antonio Barriga. "A Cambio de Que" was an immediate hit that surpassed all expectations. Thanks to the album, Los Diablos resurfaced after a period of absence, returning with great strength.

== Jenni Rivera version ==
"A Cambio de Que"

Single by Jenni Rivera

from the album Joyas Prestadas
- Released: August 28, 2011
- Recorded: 2011
- Genre: Latin pop; Banda
- Length: 4:12 (Pop version); 4:03 (Banda version)
- Label: Fonovisa
- Songwriter: Xavier Santos Córtes
- Producer: Enrique Martinez

Jenni Rivera singles chronology
"¡Basta Ya!" (2011)	"A Cambio de Que" (2011)	"Detrás de Mi Ventana" (2012)

In 2011, Mexican-American singer Jenni Rivera covered "A Cambio de Que" on her twelfth studio album Joyas Prestadas. She recorded the song in Latin pop and banda for both the pop and banda versions of Joyas Prestadas. Both versions of "A Cambio de Qué" were released as the second single from the album on August 29, 2011. In the United States, the song peaked at number 49 on the Billboard Hot Latin Songs chart and number 21 on the Billboard Regional Mexican Songs chart. The song was awarded a Lo Nuestro award for Pop Song of the Year.

=== Chart performance ===
Chart (2011)	Peak position
US Billboard Hot Latin Tracks	49
US Billboard Regional Mexican Songs	21

Chart (2013)	Peak position
US Billboard Hot Latin Tracks	37
