= Simplemente La Mejor =

Simplemente... La Mejor

Compilation album by Jenni Rivera
- Released: September 28, 2004
- Genre: Banda, norteño, Latin pop
- Label: Univision Music Group
- Producer: Jenni Rivera

Jenni Rivera chronology
Homenaje a Las Grandes (2003)	Simplemente... La Mejor (2004)	Parrandera, Rebelde y Atrevida (2005)

Professional ratings
Review scores
Source	Rating
Allmusic	4/5 stars

Simplemente La Mejor (stylized as Simplemente… La Mejor) is a compilation album by regional Mexican singer Jenni Rivera, released in 2004. It came with a bonus DVD.

== Track listing ==
1. Querida Socia
2. Las Malandrinas
3. Se las Voy a Dar a Otro
4. Cuando Abras los Ojos
5. Chicana Jalisciense
6. Que Me Entierren con la Banda
7. Se Marchó
8. Mi Vida Loca
9. Tristeza Pasajera (Illusion Pasajera)
10. Angel Baby
11. Reina de Reinas
12. La Chacalosa
13. Las Mismas Costumbres (new version)
14. Amiga Si Lo Ves (new version)
15. Simplemente La Mejor (new version)
16. Las Mismas Costumbres (norteña version)
17. Amiga Si Lo Ves (norteña version)
18. Amiga Si Lo Ves (pop version)

== DVD ==
1. Las Malandrinas (video)
2. Se las voy a Dar a Otro (video)
3. A Escondidas (video)
4. Que Me Entierren con La Banda (video featuring Lupillo Rivera)
5. Photo Gallery
6. Biography
