= Se las Voy a Dar a Otro =

Studio album by Jenni Rivera
- Released: December 5, 2001
- Genre: Banda
- Label: Fonovisa

Jenni Rivera chronology
Déjate Amar (2001)	Se las Voy a Dar a Otro (2001)	Homenaje a Las Grandes (2003)

Singles from Se las Voy a Dar a Otro
- 1. "Se las Voy a Dar a Otro" Released: 2002; 2. "Angel Baby" Released: 2002

Professional ratings
Review scores
Source	Rating
Allmusic	4/5 stars

Se las Voy a Dar a Otro (If I'm Going to Give Them Someone Else) is the fifth major label studio album by regional Mexican singer Jenni Rivera, released by Fonovisa on December 5, 2001. Se las Voy a Dar a Otro earned Rivera a nomination for Best Banda Album at the 3rd Annual Latin Grammy Awards.

== Track listing ==
No.	Title	Writer(s)	Length
1.	"Angel Baby"	Jenni Rivera	3:29
2.	"No Vas a Jugar"	Ariel Barreras	2:37
3.	"Cuando Abras los Ojos"	Guadalupe Brisas	3:42
4.	"El Nopal"	José Manríquez Mendoza	3:11
5.	"Tristeza Pasajera"	Pedro Rivera	2:38
6.	"Chicana Jalisciense"	Miriam Godinez	2:21
7.	"Ni Tu Esposa, Ni Tu Amante, Ni Tu Amiga"	Miguel Ángel Burgueño	3:02
8.	"Se las Voy a Dar a Otro"	Rose Hamlin & Hilde Lara	3:34
9.	"Se Marcho"	Ignacio Padilla	2:30
10.	"Escandalo"	Rafael Cárdenas	3:46

== Personnel ==
Personnel list based on the booklet

- Jenni Rivera - Voz
- Pedro Rivera - Executive Coordinator
- Pedro Iñiguez - Idea Director
- José Ángel Cabrera - Mixing Engineer and Artistic Director
- Ramón Meza - Assistant Engineer
- Vicente Diarte - Assistant Engineer
- Los Coyonqueños de Vicente Diarte - Instrumentals
- Esteban Igntczyk - Photography and Design
- Jaime Terriquez - Make-Up
