= Unbreakable: My Story, My Way =

- Author: Jenni Rivera
- Language: English & Spanish
- Publisher: Pocket Books
- Publication date: July 2, 2013
- Publication place: United States
- Media type: Print (Paperback, hardcover), ebook,
- Pages: 240
- ISBN: 978-1-4767-4475-9

Unbreakable: My Story, My Way is a 2013 New York Times best-selling autobiography written by Mexican-American singer-songwriter Jenni Rivera. It was published by Pocket Books. Rivera died in a plane crash in December 2012. The autobiography was released on July 2, 2013, which would have been her 44th birthday, the first after her death.

According to her family, the book was written on napkins and loose papers between tours and work travels. In its first week on the U.S. market it was in the top 25 most purchased books. According to Nielsen BookScan, Unbreakable: My Story, My Way reached the No. 12 position by selling more than 6,000 copies. The Spanish-language version, Inquebrantable: Mi Historia, A Mi Manera reaching the No. 2 overall spot on Amazon.
