= La Gran Señora =

Studio album by Jenni Rivera
- Released: December 1, 2009
- Recorded: September–October 2009
- Genre: Mariachi
- Length: 44:55
- Language: Spanish
- Label: Fonovisa
- Producer: Jenni Rivera (executive)

Jenni Rivera chronology
Jenni (2009)	La Gran Señora (2009)	La Gran Señora en Vivo (2010)

Alternate cover
- La Gran Señora (Banda)

Singles from La Gran Señora
- 1. "Ya Lo Sé" Released: November 17, 2009; 2. "Por Que No le Calas" Released: April 12, 2010; 3. "Déjame Volver Contigo" Released: September 23, 2010; 4. "Amarga Navidad" Released: 2011; 5. "La Gran Señora" Released: 2011

La Gran Señora (English: The Great Lady) is the tenth major label studio album by regional Mexican singer Jenni Rivera, released on December 1, 2009, by Fonovisa Records. After being a long-time performer of banda music, Rivera decided to record an album of mariachi tracks in order to appeal to her fanbase.

La Gran Señora reached number two on the Billboard Top Latin Albums chart in the United States and number nine on the Mexican Albums Chart. Five singles were released from the album: "Ya Lo Sé", "Por Que No Le Calas", "Déjame Volver Contigo", "La Gran Señora", and "Amarga Navidad". Alex Henderson of Allmusic gave the album a positive review and said, "La Diva de la Banda has no problem excelling in a mariachi-oriented environment." It has sold 112,000 copies in the United States as of November 2011. It was named the best-selling Regional Mexican Album of 2010 by Billboard.

The album earned a Latin Grammy nomination for Best Ranchero Album at the 11th Annual Latin Grammy Awards in 2010. It also received a nomination at the 2010 Oye! Awards for Popular Album of the Year. A sold-out promotional tour led to the recording of the live album La Gran Señora en Vivo, Rivera's follow-up album.

== Background and recording ==
Although Jenni Rivera's previous recordings mainly consisted of banda music, she had also performed mariachi music live on her concerts. Therefore, Rivera decided to record an album in mariachi to appeal its fan base. The album was recorded in September and October 2009. It consists of twelve cover tracks originally performed by other singers, with the exception of the title track, which was composed by Rivera. The follow-up album La Gran Señora en Vivo was released on November 22, 2010, which contains a DVD of her performing the album live at the Nokia Theatre in Los Angeles, California.

== Composition ==
The first track, "Yo Soy una Mujer", was first recorded by Cuban singer Maggie Carles on her album Canto Amo Sueno (1998). The second track, "Por Que No Le Calas", was first performed by Mexican band Los Invasores de Nuevo León on their album Amor Aventurero (2008). "Before the Next Teardrop Falls" was originally recorded by Duane Dee in 1968. Rivera also recorded a Spanish-language version of the song as "Estaré Contigo Cuando Triste Estés". "Déjame Volver Contigo" was first performed by Mexican singer Dulce on her album Heridas. "La Cara Bonita" was first performed by Mexican singer Mercedes Castro, on her album Que Todo Mexico Se Entere (2004).

"Ya Lo Sé" was originally recorded by her brother Lupillo Rivera on his album El Tiro de Gracia (2008). "Ni Princesa Ni Esclava" was originally performed by American singer Vikki Carr on her album Simplemente Mujer (1985). "No Llega El Olvido" was originally recorded by Mexican band Cuisillos on their album Vive y Déjame Vivir (2008). "La Escalera", was originally recorded by Argentinian singer, Amanda Miguel, on her album, Rompecorazones (1992). The title track was composed by Rivera herself. "Amarga Navidad" was originally recorded by Mexican singer Amalia Mendoza, on her album La Tariácuri (1958).

== Release and promotion ==
To promote the album, Rivera launched a tour throughout Mexico and the United States. The tour proved to be a success. La Gran Señora and La Gran Señora en Vivo both garnered Latin Grammy nominations in the Regional Mexican category and went platinum in Mexico and the United States. Rivera performed "Ya Lo Sé" and "Porque No Le Calas" at the 11th Annual Latin Grammy Awards. She also performed "Ya Lo Sé" at the 2010 Lo Nuestro Awards.

Years after Rivera's death by a plane crash on December 9, 2012, and to coincide with the album's 15th anniversary, Rivera's son Johnny Lopez announced that the album would receive a physical release on November 29, 2024, pressed on neon pink vinyl to match Rivera's lipstick color on the album cover. On December 5, 2025, Rivera's estate released a banda rendition of La Gran Señora.

=== Singles ===
"Ya Lo Sé" was released as the lead single from the album on November 17, 2009. In the United States, the song peaked at number sixteen on the Billboard Hot Latin Songs chart and number seven on the Billboard Regional Mexican Songs chart. "Por Que No le Calas" was the second single from the album, released on April 12, 2010. A music video was released for it, which was directed by Jose Serrano and filmed in Los Angeles, California. In the United States, it peaked at number forty-six on the Billboard Hot Latin Songs chart and number twenty-two on the Billboard Regional Mexican Songs chart.

"Déjame Volver Contigo" was released as the third single from the album on September 23, 2010. In the United States, it peaked at number thirty-one on the Billboard Regional Mexican Songs chart. "Amarga Navidad" was the third single from the album, released in 2011. In the United States, the song peaked at number thirty-three in 2011 and number twenty-five in 2012 on the Billboard Regional Mexican Songs chart. "La Gran Señora" was the fourth and final single released from the album. In the United States, it peaked at number forty-four on the Billboard Hot Latin Songs chart and number twenty-three on the Billboard Regional Mexican Songs chart.

== Critical reception ==
Professional ratings
Review scores
Source	Rating
Allmusic	4/5 stars

Alex Henderson of AllMusic gave the album four out of five stars and said, "La Diva de la Banda has no problem excelling in a mariachi-oriented environment." Leila Cobo of Billboard magazine said, "Rivera,... went out on a limb on her first ranchera album and delivered a jewel." The album earned a Latin Grammy nomination for Best Ranchero Album at the 11th Annual Latin Grammy Awards in 2010, which went to Vicente Fernández for Necesito de Tí. It also received a nomination at the 2010 Oye! Awards for Popular Album of the Year, but lost to Alejandro Fernández for Dos Mundos: Evolución + Tradición. Rivera also received a nomination for Ranchero Artist of the Year.

Rivera was awarded Female Regional Mexican Artist of the Year at the 2010 Lo Nuestro Awards. At the 2010 Latin Billboard Music Awards, she was awarded Top Latin Albums Artist of the Year, Female and Regional Mexican Airplay Artist of the Year, Female. In 2025, Rolling Stone included La Gran Señora on their list "The 250 Greatest Albums of the 21st Century So Far", with writer Tomás Mier stating that it "served in many ways as Rivera's magnum opus".

== Commercial performance ==
In Mexico, La Gran Señora peaked at number nine on the Top 100 Mexico albums chart. It was certified double platinum and gold by AMPROFON for shipping 150,000 copies in the country. In the United States, it peaked at number two on the Billboard Top Latin Albums and number one on the Billboard Regional Mexican Albums charts. The albums was certified platinum (Latin field) by the Recording Industry Association of America (RIAA) for shipments of 100,000 copies. La Gran Señora was the best-selling regional Mexican album of 2010 in the United States. The album has sold 112,000 copies in the United States as of November 2011.

After Rivera's death, La Gran Señora reached a new peak position of number six on the Top 100 Mexico albums chart, and also peaked at number 118 on the Billboard 200.

== Track listing ==
No.	Title	Writer(s)	Producer(s)	Length
1.	"Yo Soy Mujer"	Jesus Rafael	Rivera	4:16
2.	"Por Que No le Calas"	Agustin Cejudo	Rivera	3:23
3.	"Before the Next Teardrop Falls"	Vivian Keith, Ben Peters	Rivera	3:41
4.	"Déjame Volver Contigo"	Rafael Pérez Botija, Maria Enriqueta Ramos	Rivera	3:58
5.	"La Cara Bonita"	Manuel Duran, Manuel Duran Duran	Rivera	2:14
6.	"Ya Lo Sé"	Pepe Garza	Rivera	3:24
7.	"Ni Princesa Ni Esclava"	Ruben Fuentes Gassom	Rivera	3:57
8.	"No Llega el Olvido"	Espinoza Paz	Rivera	3:13
9.	"Amaneciste Conmigo" (aka Sentirte En Mi Frio)	Luis Antonio López pez	Rivera	3:40
10.	"La Escalera"	Jorge Macías	Rivera	2:59
11.	"La Gran Señora"	Jenni Rivera	Rivera	4:10
12.	"Amarga Navidad"	José Alfredo Jiménez	Rivera	3:07
13.	"Estaré Contigo Cuando Triste Estés" (Before The Next Teardrop Falls) (Spanish version)	Keith, Peters, Rivera	Rivera	3:41

== Charts ==
=== Weekly charts ===
2009 weekly chart performance for La Gran Señora
Chart (2009)	Peak position
Mexico (Top 100 Mexico)	9
US Regional Mexican Albums (Billboard)	1
US Top Latin Albums (Billboard)	2

2013 weekly chart performance for La Gran Señora
Chart (2013)	Peak position
Mexico (Top 100 Mexico)	6
US Billboard 200	118

=== Year-end charts ===
2010 year-end chart performance for La Gran Señora
Chart (2010)	Position
US Top Latin Albums (Billboard)	7

2011 year-end chart performance for La Gran Señora
Chart (2011)	Position
Mexico (Top 100 Mexico)	62
US Top Latin Albums (Billboard)	56

== Certifications ==
Region	Certification	Certified units/sales
Mexico (AMPROFON)	2× Platinum+Gold	150,000^{^}
United States (RIAA)	Platinum (Latin)	112,000
^{^} Shipments figures based on certification alone.

== Credits ==
Based on liner notes.

- Mario Hernández – Guitarrón
- Anthony Zuniga – Vihuela and Guitarra
- Danny Ramos – Accordion, Arrangement, Artistic Direction and Mixing Engineer
- Cristóbal Contreras – Violin
- Juan José Contreras – Violin
- Luis Jauregui – Violin
- Oscar Arellano – Violin
- Jorge Contreras – Trumpet
- Jenni Rivera – Principal Artist, Vocals and Executive Producer
- Salvador Sandoval – Mastering
