= Mi Vida Loca (album) =

Studio album by Jenni Rivera
- Released: March 20, 2007
- Recorded: 2006–2007
- Genre: Banda
- Label: Fonovisa
- Producer: Jenni Rivera

Jenni Rivera chronology
Besos y Copas Desde Hollywood (2006)	Mi Vida Loca (2007)	La Diva En Vivo (2007)

Professional ratings
Review scores
Source	Rating
Allmusic	4/5 stars

Mi Vida Loca (My Crazy Life) is the eighth major label studio album released by regional Mexican singer Jenni Rivera in 2007 by Fonovisa Records. There is a spoken intro before each song, as well as a final message at the end of the album. Mi Vida Loca earned Rivera the award Regional Mexican Album Of The Year at the 2008 Latin Billboard Music Awards.

== Track listing ==
No.	Title	Writer(s)	Length
1.	"Intro: Escúchame"		0:16
2.	"Mi Vida Loca"	Jenni Rivera	3:31
3.	"Intro: Mi Primer Amor"		0:20
4.	"Ahora Que Estuviste Lejos"	Demetrio Vite	3:38
5.	"Intro: Look At Me Now"		0:39
6.	"Mírame"	Bruno Danza	3:43
7.	"Intro: Nuestro Padre"		0:12
8.	"Sangre de Indio" (featuring Lupillo Rivera)	José A. Rodriguez	3:06
9.	"Intro: Que Bonito Se Siente"		0:15
10.	"La Sopa del Bebé"	Lupercio López	3:33
11.	"Intro: La Manutención"		0:16
12.	"¿Cuánto Te Debo?"	Oswaldo Villareal	2:41
13.	"Intro: Equivocada"		0:15
14.	"I Will Survive"	Dino Fekaris, Freddie Perren	3:22
15.	"Intro: Mi Madre y Yo"		0:25
16.	"Déjame Vivir"	Vicente Uvalle	3:31
17.	"Intro: Mis Hermanos y Yo"		0:34
18.	"Hermano Amigo"	María Felicitas	3:48
19.	"Intro: Yo Era Su Reina"		0:22
20.	"Dama Divina"	Jenni Rivera	2:36
21.	"Intro: Pimienta y Especias"		0:31
22.	"Inolvidable"	Espinoza Paz	2:59
23.	"Intro: Madre y Padre"		0:17
24.	"Sin Capitan"	Luis Elizalde	3:16
25.	"Intro: Metamorfósis"		0:20
26.	"Mariposa de Barrio"	Jenni Rivera	3:58
27.	"Agradecimientos: Gracias Mi Gente"		0:17

== Personnel ==
Personnel list based on Allmusic

- Jenni Rivera - Voz
- Daniel Ramos - Arranger, Art Direction, Engineer and Music Director
- Tony Espinoza - Arranger and Music Director
- Fernando Jiménez - Clarinet, Trombone, Trumpet and Tuba
- Francisco Agnaldo Ramos - Engineer, Percussion and Battery
- Caesar Lima - Photography
- Adriana Rebold - Art Direction and Graphic Design
- Oscar Sotelo Jr. - Arranger and Music Director

== Chart performance ==
Chart (2007)	Peak position
U.S. Billboard 200	113
U.S. Billboard Top Latin Albums	2
U.S. Billboard Regional Mexican Albums	1

Chart (2013)	Peak position
U.S. Billboard 200	164

== Certifications ==
Region	Certification	Certified units/sales
United States (RIAA)	Platinum (Latin)	100,000^{^}
^{^} Shipments figures based on certification alone.
