= La Diva en Vivo =

Live album by Jenni Rivera
- Released: November 6, 2007
- Genre: Regional Mexican
- Label: Fonovisa

Jenni Rivera chronology
Mi Vida Loca (2007)	La Diva en Vivo (2007)	Jenni (2008)

Professional ratings
Review scores
Source	Rating
Allmusic	4/5 stars

La Diva en Vivo is a live album released by regional Mexican singer Jenni Rivera. It was recorded in Gibson Amphitheatre, Universal City, California in 2006. La Diva en Vivo earned Rivera a nomination for the Best Ranchero Album at the 9th Annual Latin Grammy Awards.

== Track listing ==
1. Sufriendo a Solas
2. Popurri: Por un Amor/Cucurrucucu Paloma
3. La Differencia
4. Innocente Pobre Amiga
5. Paloma Negra
6. Libro Abierto
7. Me Siento Libre
8. Brincos Dieras
9. Que Me Vas a Dar
10. De Contrabando
11. La Mentada Contestada
12. Navidad Sin Ti

== Chart performance ==
Chart (2007)	Peak position
U.S. Billboard Top Latin Albums	33
U.S. Billboard Regional Mexican Albums	11
