= La Gran Señora en Vivo =

Live album by Jenni Rivera
- Released: November 22, 2010
- Genre: Regional Mexican
- Label: Fonovisa
- Producer: Jenni Rivera

Jenni Rivera chronology
La Gran Señora (2009)	La Gran Señora en Vivo (2010)	Joyas Prestadas (2011)

La Gran Señora en Vivo is a live album released by regional Mexican singer Jenni Rivera. It was recorded at the Nokia Theater in Los Angeles, California and released on November 22, 2010. La Gran Señora en Vivo earned Rivera a nomination for the Best Banda Album at the 12th Annual Latin Grammy Awards.

== Track listing ==
1. Mi Vida Loca 2 - Banda
2. ¿Cuanto Te Debo? - Banda
3. Cuando Me Acuerdo de Ti - Banda
4. Tu Camisa Puesta - Banda
5. Chuper Amigos - Banda
6. Dama Divina - Banda
7. Ni Me Viene, Ni Me Va - Banda
8. Como Tu Mujer - Mariachi
9. ¿Por Qué No le Calas? - Mariachi
10. La Gran Señora - Mariachi
11. Ya Lo Sé - Mariachi
12. ¿Qué Me Vas a Dar? - Banda
13. Inolvidable - Banda
14. Mudanzas - Banda
15. Él (Banda Version)
16. Él (Album Version)

== Charts ==
=== Weekly charts ===
Chart (2010)	Peak position
US Top Latin Albums (Billboard)	8
US Regional Mexican Albums (Billboard)	2

=== Year-end charts ===
Chart (2011)	Peak position
Mexican Albums Chart	62
US Billboard Top Latin Albums	42

== Sales and certifications ==
Region	Certification	Certified units/sales
Mexico (AMPROFON)	Platinum	60,000^{^}
^{^} Shipments figures based on certification alone.
