= Jenni (album) =

Studio album by Jenni Rivera
- Released: September 9, 2008
- Recorded: 2007–2008
- Genre: Banda, Latin pop
- Length: 43:38
- Label: Universal Music Latin Entertainment
- Producer: Jenni Rivera, Amerika Jimenez, Dany Tomas, Yaredt Leon, Manuel E. Eduardo, Javier Sanroman, Espinoza Paz.

Jenni Rivera chronology
La Diva en Vivo (2007)	Jenni (2008)	La Gran Señora (2009)

Singles from Jenni
- 1. "Culpable o Inocente" Released: September 9, 2008; 2. "Chuper Amigos" Released: 2009; 3. "Tu Camisa Puesta" Released: 2009

Singles from Jenni: Super Deluxe
- 1. "Ovarios" Released: July 14, 2009

Jenni is the ninth major label studio album by regional Mexican singer Jenni Rivera, released on September 9, 2008, by Universal Music Latin Entertainment. The album features the hit banda song "Chuper Amigos" and the hit single "Culpable o Inocente".

Jenni reached number one on the Billboard Top Latin Albums Chart in the United States. It reached number 27 on the Top 100 chart in Mexico. It was nominated for Popular Album of the Year at the 2009 Premios Oye!, whereas "Culpable o Inocente" was nominated for Record of the Year. Jenni won Top Latin Album of the Year at the 2009 Billboard Latin Music Awards. It achieved Platinum status in Mexico.

== Critical reception ==
Professional ratings
Review scores
Source	Rating
Allmusic	3.5/5 stars
Billboard	(positive)

Billboard's writer Ayala Ben-Yehud gave the album a positive review, writing "Banda diva Jenni Rivera has trademarked a swingy, midtempo groove on her brass-heavy tunes and a cackling bluntness that other regional Mexican singers of her generation don't even approach." Allmusic gave the album 3.5 out of 5 on Jenni, calling it "her best work in the past decade".

== Chart performance ==
In its first week of release, the album entered on the Billboard 200 albums chart at number thirty-one in the United States and number one on the U.S. Top Latin Albums. It moved 16,000 copies in its first week at retail, giving Rivera her first Top Latin Album number one album and best sales week ever.

== Track listing ==
Jenni
No.	Title	Writer(s)	Length
1.	"Chuper Amigos"	Jenni Rivera	4:04
2.	"Culpable o Inocente"	Camilo Sesto	3:31
3.	"Envuelvete"	Danny Tomas, Rivera, Yaredt Leon	3:39
4.	"Tu Camisa Puesta"	Rivera, Leon	3:10
5.	"Ni Me Viene Ni Me Va"	Manuel Eduardo	2:27
6.	"Con Él"	Javier Sanroman	3:45
7.	"Cuando Me Acuerdo de Ti"	Espinoza Paz	3:20
8.	"Fraude"	Rivera, Leon	2:58
9.	"Trono Caido"	Joan Sebastian	2:37
10.	"Vale la Pena"	Pepe Garza	2:50
11.	"La Cama"	Paz	3:57
12.	"Mudanzas"	C. Reynoso, Sergio Sa, Vanusa, Ponco Perez	3:13
13.	"Culpable o Inocente (Pop Version)"		4:08
14.	"La Primera Piedra"	Rivera, Sergio Cárdenas	3:32

Jenni: Super Deluxe
No.	Title	Writer(s)	Length
1.	"Chuper Amigos"		4:04
2.	"Culpable o Inocente"		3:31
3.	"Envuelvete"		3:39
4.	"Tu Camisa Puesta"		3:10
5.	"Con Él"		3:45
6.	"La Primera Piedra"		3:32
7.	"Fraude"		2:58
8.	"Vale la Pena"		2:50
9.	"Mudanzas"		3:13
10.	"Lo Pasado Pasado"	Juan Gabriel	3:43
11.	"La Re-Mentada"	Jenni Rivera	2:47
12.	"Ovarios"	Jenni Rivera	2:55

Jenni: Super Deluxe Bonus DVD
No.	Title	Length
1.	"Culpable o Inocente (Music Video)"
2.	"Inolvidable (Music Video)"
3.	"Ahora Que Estuviste Lejos"
4.	"Con Él"
6.	"Imagenes de la Vida Diaria"
7.	"Fraude"
8.	"Culpable o Inocente (Behind the Scenes)"
9.	"Photo Gallery"
10.	"Gallery"

== Personnel ==
- Daniel Ramos - Arranger, music director, Mixing Engineer, Recording Engineer and Keyboards
- Adriana Rebold - Art Direction
- Efrén Villareal - Art Direction
- Gigi Jara - Assistant
- Fernando "El Colorín" Jiménez - Clarinet, Trombone, Sousaphone and Trumpet
- Jenni Rivera - Executive Producer
- Chiquis Rivera - Concept
- Jacob Yebale - Make-Up
- Francisco Ramos - Percussion and Battery
- Caesar Lima - Photography
- Iván Montero - Stylist

== Chart performance ==
Chart (2008)	Peak position
Mexico Top 100	27
U.S. Top Latin Albums	1
U.S. Billboard 200	31
U.S. Billboard Regional Mexican Albums	1

== Sales and certifications ==
Region	Certification	Certified units/sales
Mexico (AMPROFON)	Platinum+Gold	120,000^{^}
^{^} Shipments figures based on certification alone.

== See also ==
- List of number-one Billboard Top Latin Albums of 2008
