= Que Me Entierren Con la Banda =

Studio album by Jenni Rivera
- Released: March 27, 2000
- Genre: Banda
- Label: Fonovisa

Jenni Rivera chronology
Reyna De Reynas (1999)	Que Me Entierren Con la Banda (2000)	Déjate Amar (2001)

Que Me Entierren con la Banda (Eng.: "Bury Me with the Band") is the third major label studio album by regional Mexican singer Jenni Rivera, released on March 27, 2000.

== Track listing ==
No.	Title	Length
1.	"Que Me Entierren con la Banda (Featuring Lupillo Rivera)"	02:54
2.	"Como Tú Decidas"	02:33
3.	"Que un Rayo te la Parta"	02:06
4.	"Las Malandrinas"	02:12
5.	"Son Habladas"	02:24
6.	"Rosita Alvírez"	02:34
7.	"Mañana (Te Acordaras)"	03:37
8.	"Sólo Sé de Amor"	02:30
9.	"Sinaloa... Princesa Norteña"	02:27
10.	"Ni Estando Loca"	03:18
11.	"La Reina del Palenque"	03:01
