= Joyas Prestadas =

- Joyas Prestadas: Pop

Studio album by Jenni Rivera
- Released: November 21, 2011
- Recorded: 2011 at the Twin Recording Studio in Burbank, California
- Genre: Latin pop; banda
- Length: 48:02 (Joyas Prestadas: Pop); 46:15 (Joyas Prestadas: Banda)
- Language: Spanish
- Label: Fonovisa
- Producer: Enrique Martinez

Jenni Rivera chronology
La Gran Señora en Vivo (2010)	Joyas Prestadas (2011)	La Misma Gran Señora (2012)

Alternate cover
- Joyas Prestadas: Banda

Singles from Joyas Prestadas
- 1. "¡Basta Ya!" Released: August 29, 2011; 2. "A Cambio de Qué" Released: February 28, 2012; 3. "Detrás de Mi Ventana" Released: July 3, 2012

Joyas Prestadas: Pop and Joyas Prestadas: Banda (Borrowed Jewels) are the 11th and 12th studio albums by recording artist Jenni Rivera, released on November 21, 2011, by Fonovisa Records. Joyas Prestadas is a double album consisting of eleven cover songs, each recorded in two distinct styles of music, those being pop and banda. The album was produced by Enrique Martinez. Rivera chose to cover these specific songs after being enamored with them while working as a cashier in a record store.

Recorded in 2011 at Twin Recording Studio in Burbank, California, Joyas Prestadas features a guest appearance from Mexican singer-songwriter Marco Antonio Solís on his written tracks "¡Basta Ya!" and "Como Tu Mujer". The former was released as the album's lead single, along with "A Cambio de Qué", and "Detrás de Mi Ventana" as its second and third singles. David Jeffries of AllMusic gave the album a positive review, calling its production "polished". Joyas Prestadas: Pop reached number one on the Mexican Albums Chart and number one on the Billboard Top Latin Albums chart in the United States. While Joyas Prestadas: Banda peaked at number three on the Mexican Albums Chart and number two on the Billboard Top Latin Albums chart.

Joyas Prestadas: Pop received a Lo Nuestro award for Pop Album of the Year and Billboard Latin Music Award nomination for Latin Pop Album of the Year and a nomination for Pop Album of the Year by a Female Artist at the 2013 Oye! Awards. Joyas Prestadas: Banda was awarded two Oye! awards for Banda Albums of the Year and Popular Album of the Year and a Billboard Latin Music Award nomination for Regional Mexican Album of the Year. In April 2013, both albums received Latin-field double platinum certifications by the Recording Industry Association of America (RIAA), and by December 2013, both albums would sell over 300,000 combined copies. These albums would be Rivera's final full-length recordings until 2023, when her estate posthumously released Misión Cumplida.

== Background ==
On August 23, 2011, Jenni Rivera renewed her contract with Universal Music Latin Entertainment/Fonovisa Records. To celebrate this event, she performed at the Staples Center in Los Angeles, California, becoming the first female Regional Mexican singer to do so. Rivera also announced she would be recording two albums in pop and banda titled Joyas Prestadas. The album was her first production to include ballads in a recording.

== Recording and covers ==
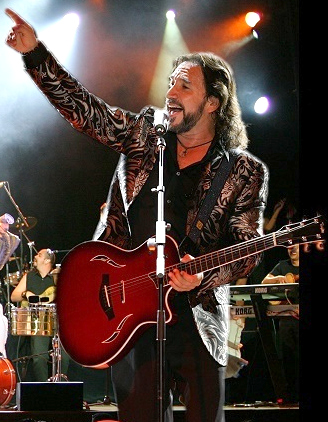
Marco Antonio Solís (pictured) appears as a guest artist on covers of "¡Basta Ya!" and "Como Tu Mujer", which he composed.

Joyas Prestadas is a double album consisted of eleven tracks originally performed by other singers. Rivera recorded these songs on two versions: pop and banda. According to her, the songs she chose were recordings she listened to while working as a record store cashier. The albums were produced by Enrique Martinez and were recorded at the Twin Recording Studio in Burbank, California. A deluxe version of Joyas Prestadas: Pop was released on August 28, 2012, which contains a DVD of her performing the album live at the Teatro de la Ciudad in Mexico City, Mexico.

The first track, "A Cambio de Qué", was first recorded by Mexican singer Marisela on her album Completamente Tuya (1985). The second track, "A Que no le Cuentas", was first performed by Puerto Rican singer Ednita Nazario on her album, Ednita (1982). "Así Fue" and "Resulta" were both composed by Mexican singer-songwriter Juan Gabriel and originally performed by Isabel Pantoja and Lucha Villa respectively. Rivera also covers Pantoja's song, "Porque Me Gusta a Morir". "¡Basta Ya" and "Como Tu Mujer" were composed by Mexican singer-songwriter Marco Antonio Solís and first performed by Olga Tañón and Rocío Dúrcal. Rivera had previously collaborated with Tañón with their cover of "Cosas del Amor" on the latter's album Exitos en 2 Tiempos (2007). Solís himself appears on both tracks.

The sixth track, "Detrás de Mi Ventana", was written by Ricardo Arjona in 1993 and included in Nueva era (1993), a studio album by Mexican singer Yuri, who performed the song for the first time. Melina Leon also performed the song for Arjona in his compilation album Trópico, released in 2009. "Lo Siento Mi Amor" and "Señora" are covers of Rocío Jurado's songs. "Que Ganas de No Verte Más" was first performed by Argentine singer Valeria Lynch.

== Release and promotion ==
Jenni Rivera performed the pop version of "¡Basta Ya!" live at La Voz... México on November 27, 2011. Four months later at the end of Yuri's concert at the National Auditorium, Rivera was invited to sing with her. After which Rivera took over the concert and performed ballads from the album as well as songs from her career. At the 19th Latin Billboard Awards ceremony, Rivera performed the pop versions of "Como Tu Mujer" and "Asi Fue". The tour for the album officially began on May 18, 2012, where she performed throughout concerts Mexico and the United States. It abruptly ended on December 9, 2012, after her concert in the Monterrey Arena when a plane carrying her and five other members crashed near Near Iturbide, Nuevo León killing her and everyone else on board.

=== Singles ===
Jenni Rivera "¡Basta Ya!" (2011)
A 24 second sample of the pop version for "¡Basta Ya!" featuring the beginning of the chorus.

Both versions of "¡Basta Ya!" were released as the lead single from the album on August 29, 2011. In the United States, the song peaked at number fourteen on the Billboard Hot Latin Songs chart and number six on the Billboard Regional Mexican Songs chart. In Mexico, the song reached number one the Monitor Latino charts and number three on the Billboard Mexican Airplay chart. A music video was released for the pop version of the song which was directed by Ricardo Moreno and filmed in Los Angeles, California. "A Cambio de Qué" was the second single to be released from the album on February 28, 2012. In the United States, the song peaked at number forty-nine on the Hot Latin Songs chart and at number twenty-one on the Regional Mexican Songs chart. In Mexico, the song peaked at number twenty-one on the Mexican Airplay chart. "Detrás de Mi Ventana" was the final single released from the album on July 3, 2012. The song peaked at number sixteen on the Hot Latin Songs chart and number six on the Regional Mexican Songs chart.

== Critical reception ==
Professional ratings
Review scores
Source	Rating
Allmusic	3.5/5 stars

David Jeffries of Allmusic gave the album a 3.5 of 5 stars and called the productions for both album "polished". At the 2012 Juventud Awards, the album received a nomination for Best Music Album. At the second Billboard Mexican Music Awards in 2012, Joyas Prestadas: Banda received an award for Banda Album of the Year and a nomination for Album of the Year. At the 25th Lo Nuestro Awards in 2013, Rivera was posthumously awarded Pop Female Artist of the Year, Pop Album of the Year for Joyas Prestadas: Pop and Pop Song of the Year for her cover of "A Cambio de Qué". A tribute to Rivera was made during the ceremony.

At the 2013 Latin Billboard Awards, Joyas Prestadas: Pop was awarded Album of the Year by a Female Artist while both albums were nominated Latin Pop Album of the Year and Regional Mexican Album of the Year. At the 2013 Mexican Oye! Awards, Joyas Prestadas: Banda was recognized Popular Album of the Year and Banda Album of the Year by a Soloist or Group, while Joyas Prestadas: Pop was nominated Pop Album of the Year by a Female Artist. Joyas Prestadas: Banda was nominated Album of the Year and Banda Album of the Year at the third Billboard Mexican Music Awards. Joyas Prestadas: Pop was nominated Top Latin Album of the Year and Latin Pop Album of the Year at the 2014 Billboard Latin Music Awards.

== Commercial performance ==
In Mexico, Joyas Prestadas: Pop peaked at number one on the Top 100 Mexico albums chart while Joyas Prestadas: Banda peaked at number three on the Top 100 Mexico albums chart. Joyas Prestadas: Pop was certified quadruple platinum and gold by AMPROFON for shipping 270,000 copies in the country while Joyas Prestadas: Banda was certified triple platinum by AMPROFON for shipping 180,000 copies. In the United States, Joyas Prestadas: Pop peaked at number one on the Billboard Top Latin Albums and number one on the Billboard Latin Pop Albums charts. Similarly, Joyas Prestadas: Banda peaked at number two on the Top Latin Albums chart and number one on the Billboard Regional Mexican Albums chart. Within the week of her death, sales for both albums soared in the United States selling over 2,000 copies. Both albums were certified double platinum (Latin field) by the Recording Industry Association of America (RIAA) for shipments of 200,000 copies. Joyas Prestadas: Pop was the best-selling Latin pop album of 2013 in the United States. As of December 2013, both albums have sold over 300,000 copies combined.

== Track listing ==
Joyas Prestadas: Pop
No.	Title	Writer(s)	Length
1.	"A Cambio de Qué"	Xavier Santos Cortés	04:00
2.	"A Que No le Cuentas"	Laureano Brizuela; Alejandro Vezzani	04:09
3.	"Así Fue"	Alberto Aguilera Valadez	04:38
4.	"¡Basta Ya!" (Featuring Marco Antonio Solís)	Marco Antonio Solís	04:13
5.	"Como Tu Mujer" (Featuring Marco Antonio Solís)	Solís	04:19
6.	"Detrás de Mi Ventana"	Ricardo Arjona	04:23
7.	"Lo Siento Mi Amor"	Manuel Alejandro; Ana Magdalena	04:11
8.	"Que Ganas de No Verte Nunca Más"	Vezzanni	03:54
9.	"Resulta"	Valadez	05:20
10.	"Señora"	Alejandro; Magdalena	03:56
11.	"Porque Me Gusta a Morir"	Alejandro	05:10
Total length:			48:03

Joyas Prestadas: Banda
No.	Title	Writer(s)	Length
1.	"A Cambio de Qué"	Cortés	04:25
2.	"A Que No le Cuentas"	Brizuela; Vezzani	04:03
3.	"Así Fue"	Valadez	04:35
4.	"¡Basta Ya!" (Featuring Marco Antonio Solís)	Solís	04:04
5.	"Como Tu Mujer" (Featuring Marco Antonio Solís)	Solís	04:26
6.	"Detrás de Mi Ventana"	Arjona	04:38
7.	"Lo Siento Mi Amor"	Alejandro; Magdalena	04:04
8.	"Que Ganas de No Verte Nunca Más"	Vezzanni	03:44
9.	"Resulta"	Valadez	03:44
10.	"Señora"	Alejandro; Magdalena	03:40
11.	"Porque Me Gusta a Morir"	Alejandro	05:03
Total length:			46:16

Joyas Prestadas: Pop Deluxe CD/DVD En Vivo Desde El Teatro De La Ciudad De Mexico (Disc 1 - CD)
No.	Title	Writer(s)	Length
1.	"¡Basta Ya!" (Featuring Marco Antonio Solís)	Solís	04:13
2.	"Así Fue"	Valadez	04:38
3.	"Resulta"	Valadez	05:20
4.	"Que Ganas de No Verte Nunca Más"	Vezzanni	04:08
5.	"Como Tu Mujer" (Featuring Marco Antonio Solís)	Solís	04:19
6.	"A Cambio de Qué"	Cortés	04:00
7.	"Señora"	Alejandro; Magdalena	03:56
8.	"A Que No le Cuentas"	Alejandro; Magdalena	04:09
9.	"Detrás de Mi Ventana"	Arjona	04:23
10.	"Porque Me Gusta a Morir"	Alejandro	05:10
11.	"Lo Siento Mi Amor"	Alejandro; Magdalena	04:11
Total length:			48:03

Joyas Prestadas: Pop Deluxe CD/DVD En Vivo Desde El Teatro De La Ciudad De Mexico (Disc 2 - DVD)
No.	Title	Writer(s)	Length
1.	"Introducción"		01:22
2.	"¡Basta Ya!"	Solís	04:59
3.	"Así Fue"	Valadez	04:50
4.	"Resulta"	Valadez	05:23
5.	"Que Ganas de No Verte Nunca Más"	Vezzanni	03:54
6.	"Como Tu Mujer"	Solís	04:28
7.	"A Cambio de Qué"	Cortés	04:00
8.	"Señora"	Alejandro; Magdalena	03:57
9.	"A Que No le Cuentas"	Brizuela; Vezzani	04:19
10.	"Detrás de Mi Ventana"	Arjona	04:28
11.	"Porque Me Gusta a Morir"	Alejandro	05:08
12.	"Lo Siento Mi Amor"	Alejandro; Magdalena	04:36
13.	"Entrevista"		06:38
14.	"Menú Principal/Jenni Riversa/Joyas Prestadas Pop Deluxe"		01:01
Total length:			59:04

== Credits and personnel ==
The following credits are from AllMusic:

- Federico Ramos - acoustic and electric guitars
- Peggy Baldwin - cello
- Oscar Benavides - chorus
- Robert Bernstein - dobro, pedal steel
- Jorge Brauet - saxophone, soloist
- Alan Busteed - violin
- Mark Cargill - violin
- Juan Pablo Castillo - coros
- Susan Chapman - violin
- Rebecca Chung - violin
- Gustavo Farias - Fender Rhodes, Hammond B3
- Paula Fehrenbach - cello
- Martín Flores- drums
- Alfredo "Pollo" Fuentes - mixing
- Nicole Garcia - violin
- Ilona Geller - viola
- Terry Glenny - violin
- Paul Grundman - mastering
- Rob Hardt - saxophone
- Juan Manuel Cortez - conductor
- Pablo Hopenhaya - violin
- Ami Levy - violin
- Enrique Martinez - arrangements, chorus, director, Fender Rhodes
- Sylvana Martínez - chorus
- Neli Nikolaeva - violin
- Boryana Popova - violin
- Shelly Ren - violin
- Jenni Rivera - vocals (main), primary artist
- Kathleen Robertson - violin
- Carlos Rodgarman - synthesizer
- Javier Rodriguez - flugelhorn
- Kathleen Sloan- violin
- Jean Smit - mixing
- Arturo Solar - conductor, flugelhorn, soloist
- Marco Antonio Solís - guest vocals (tracks 4 and 5)
- Marisa Ann Sorajja - violin
- Allison Speith - viola
- Jenny Takamatsu - violin
- Jonathan Thomson - cello
- Francisco Torres - trombone
- Ina Veli - violin
- Javier Vergara - sax (alto), sax (tenor)
- Dynell Weber - violin
- Dorthy Won - violin
- Chris Woods - viola
- Alwyn Wright - violin
- Nick Yee - viola
- Amanda Zidow - cello
- Ito Serrano – guitar
- Charlie Sierra – percussion, bongos, timbales
- William Thompson – conga
- Maximo Torres – guitar, requinto
- Raffi Torres – trombone
- Yanira Torres – vocals, coro

== Charts ==
=== Weekly charts ===
Joyas Prestadas: Pop

Weekly chart performance for Joyas Prestadas: Pop
Chart (2011–2013)	Peak position
Mexican Albums Chart (AMPROFON)	1
US Billboard 200	51
US Latin Pop Albums (Billboard)	1
US Top Latin Albums (Billboard)	1

Joyas Prestadas: Banda

Weekly chart performance for Joyas Prestadas: Banda
Chart (2011–2013)	Peak position
Mexican Albums Chart (AMPROFON)	3
US Billboard 200	74
US Regional Mexican Albums (Billboard)	1
US Top Latin Albums (Billboard)	2

=== Year-end charts ===
Joyas Prestadas: Pop

Chart (2011)	Position
Mexican Albums Chart (AMPROFON)	71

Chart (2012)	Position
Mexican Albums Chart (AMPROFON)	3
US Top Latin Albums (Billboard)	12
US Latin Pop Albums (Billboard)	3

Chart (2013)	Position
Mexican Albums Chart (AMPROFON)	10
US Billboard 200	196
US Top Latin Albums (Billboard)	3
US Latin Pop Albums (Billboard)	1

Joyas Prestadas: Banda

Chart (2011)	Position
Mexican Albums Chart (AMPROFON)	47

Chart (2012)	Position
Mexican Albums Chart (AMPROFON)	15
US Top Latin Albums (Billboard)	4
US Regional Mexican Albums (Billboard)	2

Chart (2013)	Position
Mexican Albums Chart (AMPROFON)	57
US Top Latin Albums (Billboard)	4
US Regional Mexican Albums (Billboard)	2

== Certifications ==
Joyas Prestadas: Pop

Region	Certification	Certified units/sales
Mexico (AMPROFON)	4× Platinum+Gold	270,000^{^}
United States (RIAA)	2× Platinum (Latin)	200,000^{^}
^{^} Shipments figures based on certification alone.

Joyas Prestadas: Banda

Region	Certification	Certified units/sales
Mexico (AMPROFON)	3× Platinum	180,000^{^}
United States (RIAA)	2× Platinum (Latin)	200,000^{^}
^{^} Shipments figures based on certification alone.

== Release history ==
Regions	Dates	Format(s)	Label(s)	Edition(s)
United States	November 21, 2011	CD, digital download	Fonovisa	Pop & Banda
United States	August 28, 2012	CD, digital download	Fonovisa	Pop Deluxe

== See also ==
- 2011 in Latin music
- List of number-one albums of 2013 (Mexico)
- List of number-one Billboard Latin Albums from the 2010s
- List of number-one Billboard Latin Pop Albums from the 2010s
