= Homenaje a Las Grandes =

Studio album by Jenni Rivera
- Released: April 1, 2003
- Genre: Banda, norteño
- Label: Fonovisa

Jenni Rivera chronology
Se las Voy a Dar a Otro (2001)	Homenaje a Las Grandes (2003)	Simplemente... La Mejor (2004)

Singles from Homenaje a Las Grandes
- 1. "A Escondidas" Released: 2003; 2. "Juro Que Nunca Volvere" Released: 2004

Professional ratings
Review scores
Source	Rating
Allmusic	4/5 stars

Homenaje a Las Grandes (Homage of the Greatest) is the sixth major label studio album by regional Mexican singer Jenni Rivera, released by Fonovisa on April 1, 2003. It is a tribute album.

== Track listing ==
No.	Title	Length
1.	"La Papa Sin Catsup"	3:11
2.	"A Escondidas"	3:22
3.	"Por un Amor, Cucurrucucu Paloma"	3:39
4.	"Ese Hombre"	3:07
5.	"Juro Que Nunca Volvere"	2:37
6.	"La Tequilera"	2:44
7.	"Ahora Vengo a Verte"	3:16
8.	"Hacer el Amor con Otro"	3:48
9.	"Homenaje a Mi Madre"	3:20
10.	"Where Did Our Love Go"	2:58
11.	"La Papa Sin Catsup (Norteña Version) [Bonus Track]"	3:10
12.	"A Escondidas (Norteña Version) [Bonus Track]"	3:22
13.	"Juro Que Nunca Volvere (Norteña Version) [Bonus Track]"	3:03
14.	"Hacer el Amor con Otro (Norteña Version) [Bonus Track]"	3:52

== Charts ==
Chart (2004)	Peak Position
US Top Latin Albums (Billboard)	37
