= Parrandera, Rebelde y Atrevida =

Studio album by Jenni Rivera
- Released: September 20, 2005
- Genre: Banda
- Length: 38:03
- Label: Fonovisa Records
- Producer: Pedro Rivera

Jenni Rivera chronology
Simplemente... La Mejor (2004)	Parrandera, Rebelde y Atrevida (2005)	En Vivo Desde Hollywood (2006)

Singles from Parrandera, Rebelde y Atrevida
- 1. "Qué Me Vas a Dar" Released: 2005; 2. "De Contrabando" Released: 2006; 3. "No Vas a Creer" Released: 2006

Professional ratings
Review scores
Source	Rating
Allmusic	4/5 stars

Parrandera, Rebelde y Atrevida (English: Party Girl, Rebel and Daring) is the seventh major label studio album by regional Mexican singer Jenni Rivera, released on September 20, 2005 by Fonovisa Records. The album was produced by Rivera's father, Pedro Rivera.

Parrandera, Rebelde y Atrevida reached number ten on the Billboard Top Latin Albums Chart in the United States. It was certified double platinum in the United States and certified gold in Mexico. Alex Henderson of Allmusic gave the album a rating of 4 out of 5 and described Rivera as "...a delightfully ironic and unique figure in regional Mexican music."

== Track listing ==
No.	Title	Writer(s)	Length
1.	"Parrandera, Rebelde Y Atrevida"	Jenni Rivera	02:55
2.	"Que Me Vas A Dar"	Alfonso Garcia, Ramon Ortega	03:14
3.	"De Contrabando"	Joan Sebastian	03:05
4.	"Brincos Dieras"		03:19
5.	"La Mentada Contestada"	Jenni Rivera	02:48
6.	"No Vas A Creer"	Vicente Fernández	02:58
7.	"Imbécil"	Guadalupe Ramos	03:24
8.	"No Me Pregunten Por Él"	Carlos Peña	03:39
9.	"Jefa De Jefas"	Jenni Rivera	02:59
10.	"Me Siento Libre"	Jenni Rivera	02:22
11.	"Cuando Muere Una Dama"	Jenni Rivera	04:05
Total length:			38:04

== Charts ==
Weekly chart performance for Parrandera, Rebelde y Atrevida
Chart (2005)	Peak position
US Heatseekers Albums (Billboard)	17
US Regional Mexican Albums (Billboard)	10
US Top Latin Albums (Billboard)	2

2013 weekly chart performance for Parrandera, Rebelde y Atrevida
Chart (2013)	Peak position
US Billboard 200	146

== Certifications ==
Region	Certification	Certified units/sales
Mexico (AMPROFON)	Gold	50,000^{^}
United States (RIAA)	2× Platinum (Latin)	200,000^{^}
^{^} Shipments figures based on certification alone.
