= Si Quieres Verme Llorar =

Studio album by Jenni Rivera
- Released: May 25, 1999
- Recorded: 1998–1999
- Genre: Mariachi, Latin pop
- Label: Sony Music/Cintas Acuario

Jenni Rivera chronology
| Si Quieres Verme Llorar (1999) | Reyna De Reynas (1999) |

Si Quieres Verme Llorar (transl. "If You Want to See Me Cry") is the major label debut studio album released by regional Mexican singer Jenni Rivera on May 25, 1999, by Sony Music. It was re-released in 2008 by Cintas Acuario.

== Reception ==
Professional ratings
Review scores
| Source | Rating |
|---|---|
| AllMusic | 2.5/5 stars |

David Jeffries, in his review for AllMusic, calls Rivera's Si Quieres Verme Llorar "a low point in her discography". She does flirt with mariachi and ranchera music, a sound she "wouldn't experiment with again until 2009", but the album should be considered a "transitional work" in Rivera's career.

== Track listing ==
| No. | Title | Writer(s) | Length |
|---|---|---|---|
| 1. | "Brincos Dieras" | Obdulia Pena López | 02:43 |
| 2. | "Perdonar Es Olvidar" | Eva Torres | 02:40 |
| 3. | "Llanto Rojo" | Jorge Montano | 02:40 |
| 4. | "Lágrimas, Sudor y Sangre" | Jenni Rivera | 02:47 |
| 5. | "La Puerta de Alcalá" | Bernando Fuster, Francisco Villar, Luis Mendo Muñoz, Miguel Angel | 02:21 |
| 6. | "Si Quieres Verme Llorar" | Johny Herrera | 03:07 |
| 7. | "Vivir Sin Tu Cariño (Without You)" | Jenni Rivera | 04:35 |
| 8. | "Nosotros" | Nargo Bolado, Pedro Junco Jr. | 03:30 |
| 9. | "Como Vivir Sin Verte (How Do I Live)" | Diane Warren, Rudy Perez | 04:26 |
| 10. | "Tonto" | Ismael Armenda | 03:06 |
| 11. | "Yo Te Agradezco" | Ángel Heriberto | 05:09 |
