= Jenni Rivera =

American singer (1969–2012)

- Rivera in 2009
- Born: Dolores Janney Rivera; July 2, 1969; Long Beach, California, U.S.
- Died: December 9, 2012 (aged 43); Iturbide, Nuevo León, Mexico
- Cause of death: Plane crash
- Resting place: All Souls Cemetery, Long Beach, California, U.S.
- Monuments: En Memoria de la Diva de la Banda; Jenni Rivera Memorial Park
- Other names: La Diva de la Banda (The Diva of Band); La Primera Dama del Corrido (The First Lady of Corrido); La Gran Señora (The Great Lady)
- Education: California State University, Long Beach
- Occupations: Singer; songwriter; actress; businesswoman; producer
- Years active: 1992–2012
- Spouses: José Trinidad Marín (m. 1984; div. 1992) Juan López (m. 1997; div. 2003) Esteban Loaiza (m. 2010; sep. 2012)
- Children: 5, including Chiquis
- Family: Lupillo Rivera (brother); Juan Rivera (brother); Rosie Rivera (sister)
- Awards: List of awards and nominations
- Musical career
- Genre: Regional Mexican
- Instrument: Vocals
- Label: Sony Latin
- Website: jennirivera.com

Signature
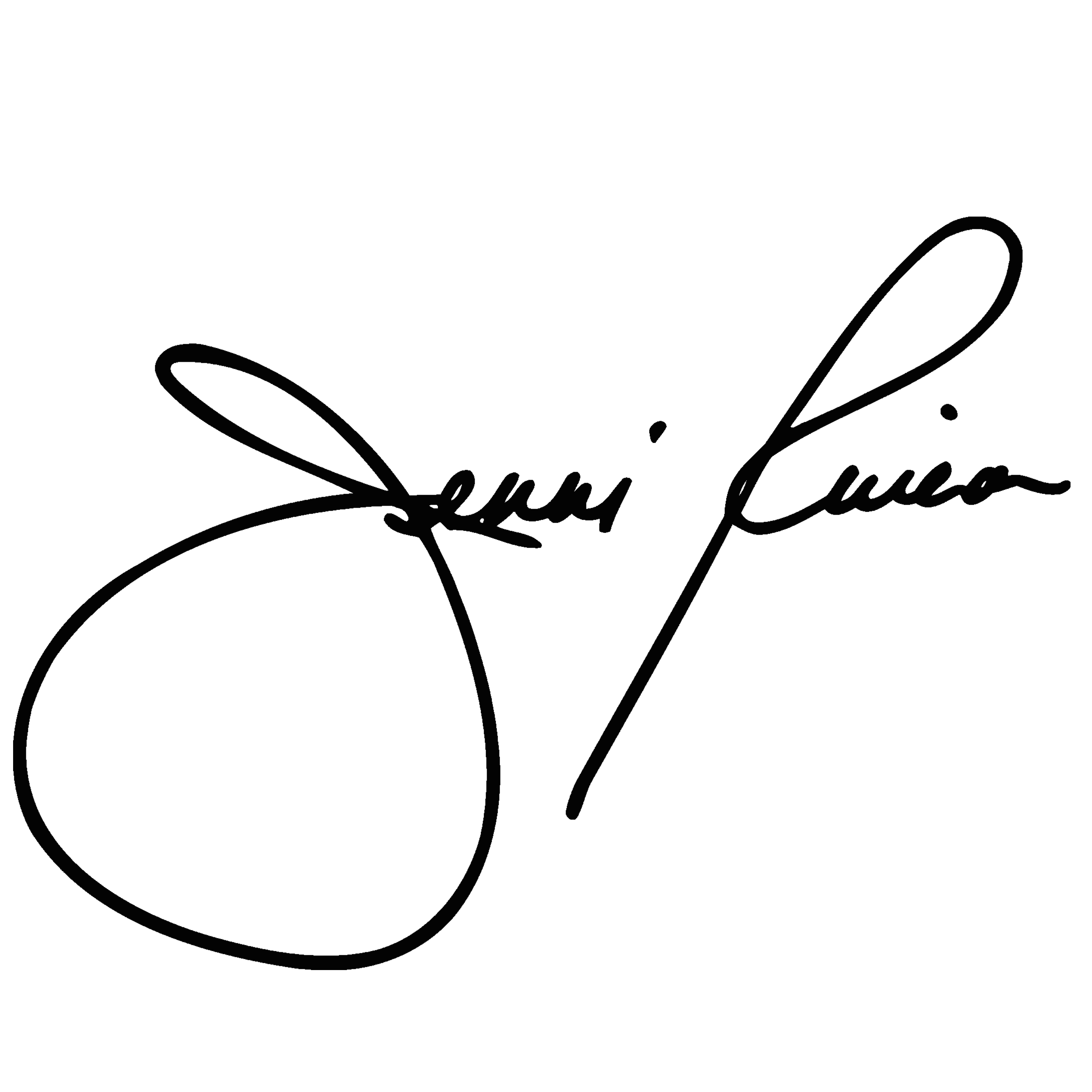

Dolores Janney "Jenni" Rivera (July 2, 1969 – December 9, 2012) was an American singer, songwriter, actress, businesswoman, and producer known for her work within the regional Mexican music genre, specifically in the styles of banda, mariachi and norteño. In life and death, several media outlets including CNN, Billboard, Fox News, and The New York Times have labeled her the most important female figure and top-selling female artist in regional Mexican music. Billboard magazine named her the "Top Latin Artist of 2013", and the "Best Selling Latin Artist of 2013".

Rivera began recording music in 1992. Her recordings often had themes of social issues, infidelity, tax evasion and inflation. Rivera released her first studio album, Poco a Poco, in the mid 1990s, failing to attain commercial success; however, she rose to prominence in the United States and Mexico with her 2005 album, Parrandera, Rebelde y Atrevida. In the mid to late 1990s, she was often criticized and was refused bookings at venues across California for performing Banda music—a male-dominated music genre. However, her popularity grew after she released her song "Las Malandrinas", which received airtime on the radio. She gained more popularity when she won the Lo Nuestro Award for Regional Mexican Female Artist of the Year in 2007, which she won nine consecutive times. Her tenth studio album, Jenni (2008), became her first No.1 record on the Billboard Top Latin Albums chart in the United States. In 2010, she appeared in and produced the reality TV show Jenni Rivera Presents: Chiquis & Raq-C. She also appeared in and produced I Love Jenni starting in 2011 through 2013 and Chiquis 'n Control in 2012. Her acting debut was in the film Filly Brown, which was released in 2013.

Over the course of her career, Rivera was awarded two Oye! Awards (Mexico's equivalent to the United States' Grammy Awards), two Billboard Music Awards, twenty-two Billboard Latin Music Awards, eleven Billboard Mexican Music Awards and eighteen Lo Nuestro Awards. She received four Latin Grammy nominations. She has a star on the Hollywood Walk of Fame, Las Vegas Walk of Stars, and she is one of the best-selling regional Mexican artists of all time, having sold more than 15 million records worldwide, also making her the highest-earning banda singer of all time.

Aside from music, she was active in her community and donated her time to civic causes. The National Coalition Against Domestic Violence appointed her its spokesperson in the United States. A proclamation was given officially naming August 6 "Jenni Rivera Day" by the Los Angeles City Council for all her charity work and community involvement.

Rivera, along with six others, died in a plane crash near Monterrey, on December 9, 2012. An investigation was unable to determine the causes of the accident. Lawsuits involving the owners of the plane, Rivera's estate, and family members of those on board with Rivera were filed.

== Life and career ==
=== 1969–1991: Childhood ===
Dolores Janney Rivera was born and raised in Long Beach, California, to Rosa Saavedra and Pedro Rivera, both from Mexico. Her parents raised Rivera and her sister and four brothers in a tight-knit, musical household; her brother Lupillo is also a regional Mexican musician. Rivera spoke both English and Spanish fluently. Her family introduced her to traditional Mexican music, including the genres of banda, norteña, and ranchera. Rivera earned straight A's in school until her sophomore year, when at 15 she became pregnant with the first of her five children, Janney "Chiquis" Marin. She supported the two of them by selling CDs at flea markets, while working toward her GED at a continuation school and graduating as class valedictorian. Speaking in 2003 of her experiences as a teenage mother, Rivera explained:

Usually, when a young girl is pregnant, she drops out of school and concentrates on being a mother. I thought that's what I had to do, but my counselors told me there was no way they would let me drop out. I had too much promise.

She attended Long Beach City College before transferring to California State University, Long Beach, where she obtained a degree in business administration. Prior to working for her father's record label, she worked in real estate. Her father was a bartender and businessman who created the record label Cintas Acuario in 1987, which launched the career of Mexican singer and songwriter Chalino Sánchez.

=== 1992–2004: Beginnings in music ===
Rivera was introduced to music in 1992 when she recorded as a Father's Day present to her father; she made more recordings and signed to Capitol/EMI's Latin division. Her first album, "Somos Rivera" ("We Are Rivera"), was released in 1992.

At the onset of her musical career, she was told many times she would not make it. At that time and still today, the genre known as regional Mexican music was and is dominated by men. In a 2011 interview with Billboard magazine, she stated, "It was hard knocking on those doors to get my music played. One radio programmer in L.A., the meanest son of a bitch in the world, threw my CD in the trash right in my face." Those were the kind of issues Rivera faced as a female trying to crack the regional Mexican genre. She then released the albums La Maestra, Poco a Poco, Por Un Amor, La Chacalosa, and Adios a Selena, the latter a tribute album to Tejano music singer Selena, who was murdered in 1995.

She signed to Balboa Records in 1993, Sony Music in the late 1990s, and then with Fonovisa Records in 2000; in the same year, Rivera released her first commercial album with Fonovisa, titled Que Me Entierren Con la Banda, featuring local hit "Las Malandrinas". Rivera stated that she wrote "Las Malandrinas" to pay homage to her female fans. She also said, "The song blew up. People became interested. That's when Jenni Rivera the artist was actually born."

In 2001, she released the records Dejate Amar and Se las Voy a Dar a Otro, which garnered her her first Latin Grammy nomination for Best Banda Album. She became the first American-born artist to be nominated for the award in 2003. Her 2003 release Homenaje a Las Grandes (in English "Homage to the Great Ones") was a tribute album to female Mexican singers.

In 2004, she released her first compilation disc, titled Simplemente... La Mejor, which became her first record to detonate a chart in the United States.

=== 2005–2010: Parrandera, Rebelde y Atrevida, Mi Vida Loca, Jenni and La Gran Señora ===
She began to attain more substantial success with the record Parrandera, Rebelde y Atrevida, released in 2005, which peaked at No. 10 on the Billboard Top Latin Albums chart. Since its release it has been certified double-platinum in the Latin field by the Recording Industry Association of America. The second single released from the album, "De Contrabando", became her first and only number-one song to hit the Latin Regional Mexican Airplay in the United States. It is also said to be one of her most known songs.

In 2007, she released Mi Vida Loca, which debuted at number 1 on the Regional Mexican Albums chart and number 2 on the Top Latin Albums chart in the United States. The album garnered an award for Regional Mexican Album of the Year at the 2008 Latin Billboard Music Awards. In a 2011 interview with Billboard magazine she stated, "That was more of Jenni telling her story through music. My life has been so put out there by the media that I figured I might as well put it out there myself, in my own words and through my music. I wanted to clear up speculations about my private life." The album also garnered Rivera her first Lo Nuestro Award for Regional Mexican Female Artist of the Year, an award she would dominate for the rest of her life. The same year she released La Diva en Vivo, a live album that consisted of songs recorded with a mariachi band, which garnered her her second Latin Grammy nomination for Best Ranchero Album. That year she was the only female singer nominated in that category. The album was recorded at The Gibson Amphitheater in Universal City, California. Rivera sold out the concert, the first female banda singer to do so. Her tenth studio album, Jenni, released in 2008, became her first No. 1 record on the Billboard Top Latin Albums chart in the United States. The album won Rivera her second Lo Nuestro Award for Banda Artist of the Year, the first (and, to date, only) female act to win the accolade.

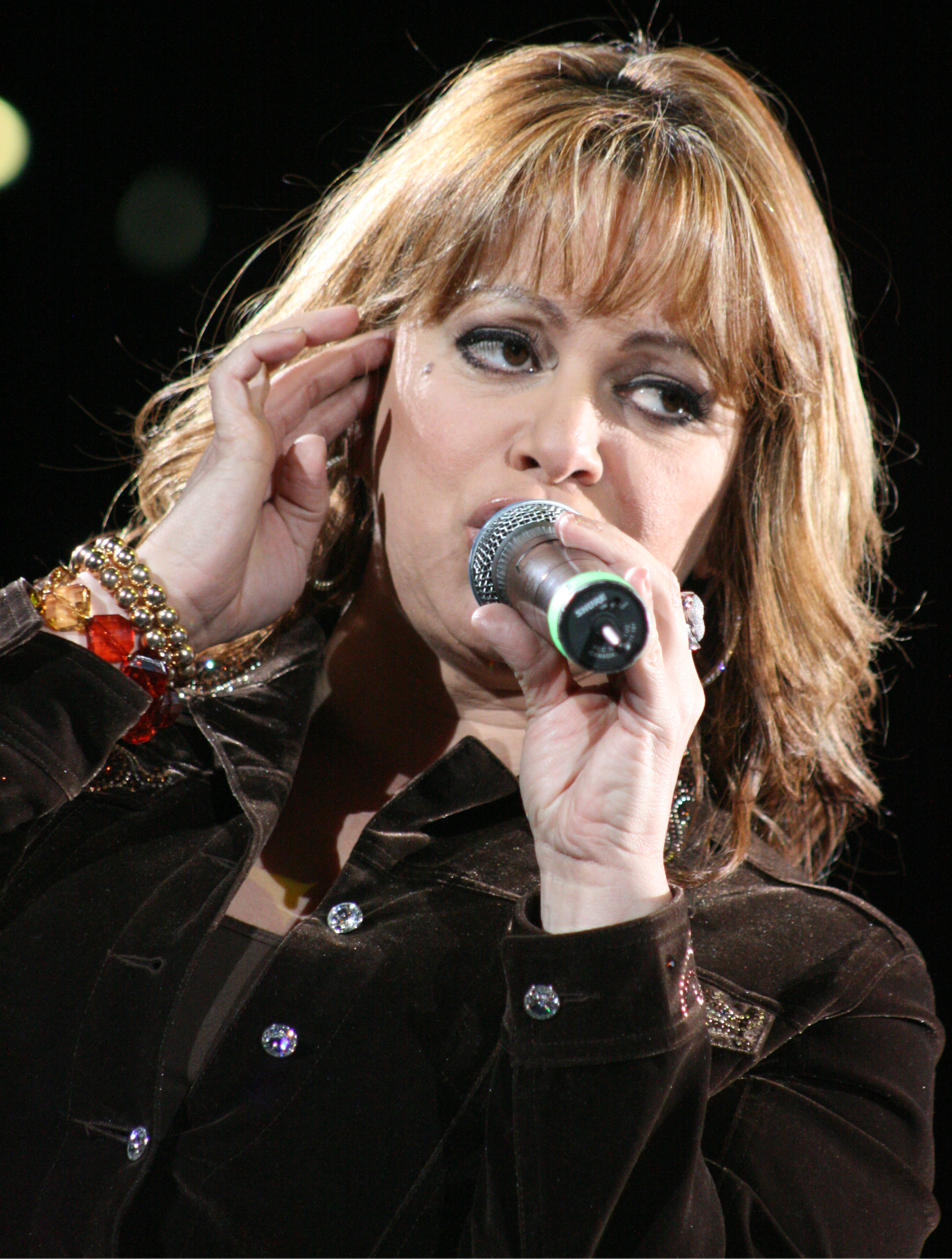
Rivera performing at the Pepsi Center in 2009

In 2009, she changed course and recorded her first full mariachi studio album titled La Gran Señora, which garnered a Latin Grammy nomination for Best Ranchero Album. It peaked at No. 2 on the Billboard Top Latin Albums chart in the United States. In an interview Rivera said that releasing the album was very daring and marked her career in a positive way. She said she wanted to grow as an artist and the people that listen to banda will listen to mariachi if they find a good album that they feel is worth buying. She went on to say there are certain nationalities that will listen to mariachi and not banda. Those were the people that she was going after. She also stated, "Commercializing a ranchera album is much harder. There had not been a successful female mariachi artist in a long time. It was a big risk, but it was a risk that I was willing to take. La Gran Señora ended up being the biggest-selling [regional Mexican] album of 2010."

=== 2010–2012: Reality shows, Las Vegas Star, Joyas Prestadas, and La Voz Mėxico ===
In 2010, she announced she would be going on tour to promote her latest album, La Gran Señora. At the end of the tour, she released La Gran Señora en Vivo, a live album that consisted of hits in banda and mariachi. It debuted at No. 8 on the Top Latin Albums chart in the United States. She recorded the album and became the first Latin artist to sell out two back-to-back nights at the Nokia Theatre in Los Angeles, on August 6–7, 2010.

She also became the first Latin artist to sell out the Nokia Theatre on July 9, 2009. The tour proved to be a success. La Gran Señora and La Gran Señora en Vivo both garnered Latin Grammy nominations in the Regional Mexican category and went platinum in Mexico and the United States.

On August 23, 2011, she renewed her contract with Universal Music Latin Entertainment/Fonovisa Records.

To celebrate this event, she performed at and sold out the Staples Center in Los Angeles, becoming the first female Regional Mexican singer to do so.

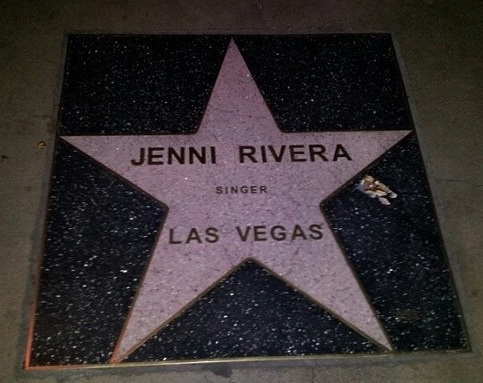
Rivera's star on the Las Vegas Walk of Stars

At the concert, she announced she would be recording Joyas Prestadas, which consists of eleven cover versions, with the first album being recorded in Latin pop, while the second was recorded in banda. Both albums were produced by Enrique Martinez. According to Rivera, the songs she chose to cover were those she was enamored with while working as a cashier in a record store. It was her first production to include ballad recordings. She has also sold out Mexico's National Auditorium, a feat few female singers in her genre ever achieve.

Rivera was a producer on the Mun2 reality TV show Chiquis & Raq-C, featuring her oldest daughter Chiquis. She then appeared in the spin-off show I Love Jenni. Rivera worked as coach in the second season of the Mexican talent show La Voz... México, based upon The Voice franchise. In October 2012, People en Español named her one of the Top 25 most powerful women.

In December 2012, Rivera was only the third singer to place three albums on the entire top three on the Billboard Top Latin Albums chart with her albums No.1 La Misma Gran Señora, No. 2 Joyas Prestadas: Pop, and No. 3 Joyas Prestadas: Banda. She joins two other leading singers, who also achieved the feat only in death: Celia Cruz and Selena Quintanilla. In life and death, several media outlets including CNN, Billboard, Fox News, and The New York Times have labeled Rivera the most important female figure and top-selling female artist in the regional Mexican music genre.

=== 2013–present: Posthumous movie, book, and album releases ===
By early 2013 Rivera had sold some 15 million albums worldwide. On December 11, 2012, two days after her death, Fonovisa Records released La Misma Gran Señora. The album debuted at No.1 on Billboard's Top Latin Albums chart, No.1 on Billboard Regional Mexican Albums chart and No.1 on Mexico's Top 100 chart. Since its release, it has been awarded one Billboard Music Award, three Latin Billboard Music Awards, and two Mexican Billboard Music Awards. At the 2013 Billboard Music Awards it was awarded the Top Latin Album accolade.

Since her death in 2012, she has earned a spot on the Forbes Top Earning Dead Celebrities of 2013, making an estimated 7 million dollars. Posthumously, Rivera has been awarded two Oye! Awards (Mexico's equivalent to the Grammy Awards). Posthumously, Billboard magazine named her the "Top Latin Artist of 2013".

Her long career included such honors as 20 million albums sold worldwide, making her the highest-earning banda singer of all time.

On April 19, 2013, her debut film, Filly Brown, was released. Rivera played a drug-addicted mother in prison. Oscar-nominated actor Edward James Olmos, who served as executive producer on the film, called Rivera's performance "Oscar-worthy".

On July 2, 2013, Unbreakable/Inquebrantable, Rivera's official autobiography, arrived. Rivera had been working on it for years, and after her death her family put it together and turned it into a full book that became an instant New York Times bestseller. The total sales from Jenni Rivera's autobiography's different editions (including English and Spanish) made it the top-selling book in the United States the week of its release, Univision reported. Rivera's family has released two parts of her last concert in Monterrey, titled 1969 - Siempre, En Vivo Desde Monterrey, Parte 1 and 1969 - Siempre, En Vivo Desde Monterrey, Parte 2. Both albums have been commercially successful, in the United States and Mexico. Both albums peaked at No. 1 on Billboard's Top Latin Albums chart, No. 1 on the Regional Mexican Albums chart, and No. 2 on Mexico's Top 100 chart. Rivera was ranked in at number 1 on Billboard's "Top 10 Regional Mexican Musicians 2009-2014" list.

On July 1, 2014, Rivera's album 1969 - Siempre, En Vivo Desde Monterrey, Parte 2 went on sale and sold over 10,000 in the week ending July 6, according to Nielsen SoundScan. Since the album's release, Rivera has tied with Selena Quintanilla for most no. 1s by a female on the Regional Mexican Albums chart. Billboard magazine named Rivera the highest-ranked woman on the year-end Top Latin Artists chart of 2014, ranking at No. 5.

At the 2015 Billboard Latin Music Awards Rivera was awarded Top Latin Albums Female Artist of the Year and Regional Mexican Artist of the Year.

In November 2018, Jenni Rivera Enterprises signed a music distribution deal with Sony Music Entertainment (through its Sony Music Latin and The Orchard labels).

In June 2023, Rivera's family released Misión Cumplida which is her first, and posthumous, studio album in eleven years since the release of Joyas Prestadas.

== Style ==
Rivera's musical style was classified as Banda, a form of traditional Mexican music popular in Mexico and parts of the United States with large Hispanic populations. Banda music originated in the state of Sinaloa and the music sound is primarily instruments such as tuba, clarinets and trumpets, exemplified by bands such as Banda El Recodo and Banda La Costena. However, according to Leila Cobo of Billboard, her music contained a "contemporary, outspoken flair". She sang in both Spanish and English and often addressed personal themes such as her struggles with domestic violence, divorce, and her weight.

Rivera described speaking openly with her fans about her personal issues as a "primary part" of her career. Discussing her unconventional approach and her single "Las Malandrinas", Rivera explained, "It was the late 1990s and the early 2000s and the female singers were singing ballads and romantic fare. So I figured, I'm not typical at all in any way, so I'm going to do what the guys do but in a different voice." She was given names such as "La Diva de la Banda" and "La Primera Dama del Corrido" for her work in the banda and corrido genre.

Although banda was her main focus, she also released albums in norteño and mariachi.

== Personal life ==
=== Marriages and children ===
Rivera was married three times and had five children. She gave birth to her first child, Janney "Chiquis" (born 1985), while still in high school. She later married the baby's father, José Trinidad Marín, and they had two more children, but she ended the marriage in 1992 citing physical and emotional abuse. In 1997 her younger sister Rosie confessed that Jenni's ex-husband (Marín) used to sexually abuse her, and was now doing the same to Chiquis. Physical examination showed he had done the same with Jacqie. The molestation case was opened in 1997 and Marín spent 9 years as a fugitive before he was apprehended in April 2006, convicted of sexual assault and rape and sentenced to more than 31 years in prison without parole.

Rivera married her second husband, Juan López, in 1997. They had two children before they divorced in 2003. In 2007, López was convicted of selling drugs. He died from complications of pneumonia while in prison in 2009.

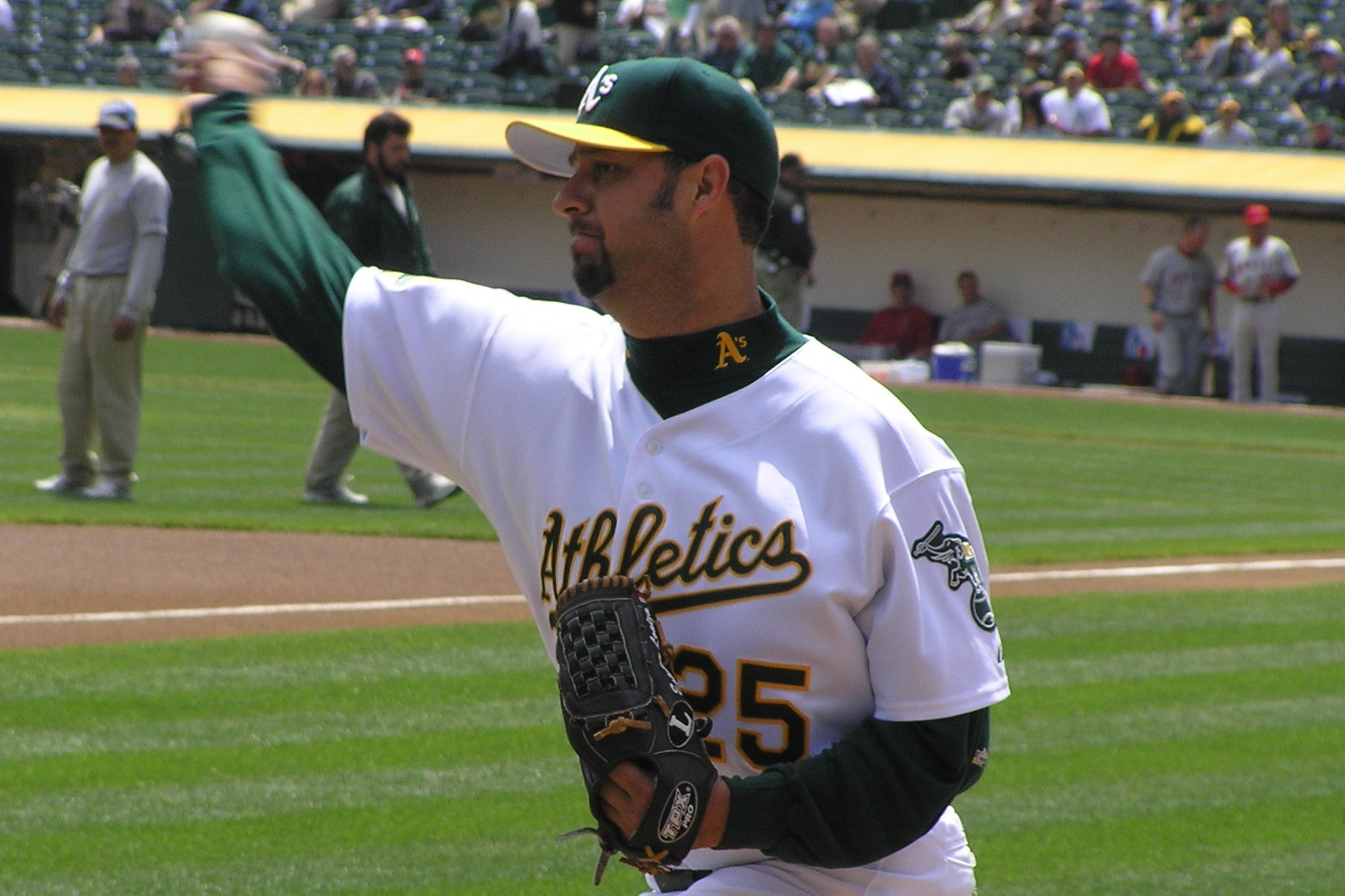
Rivera's third husband, baseball pitcher Esteban Loaiza

Rivera married baseball player Esteban Loaiza in 2010. They filed for divorce in 2012 just months before her death, but it was never finalized.

=== Charity work ===
On August 6, 2010, Rivera was named spokeswoman for the National Coalition Against Domestic Violence. A proclamation was given "officially naming" August 6 “Jenni Rivera Day” by the Los Angeles City Council. This was a tribute to her significant contributions to the community, particularly her advocacy for women and children affected by violence. In addition to her work with the NCADV, Rivera was deeply involved with Children's Hospital Los Angeles, where she supported the hospital’s mission and fundraising efforts, and was honored by being added to the hospitals wall of fame. Rivera was a Roman Catholic. However, her brother Pedro Rivera Jr. is the pastor of the Primer Amor Church in Whittier, California further cementing the family's ties to both faith and community service..

=== Legal issues ===
In June 2008, Univisión reported that Rivera was arrested after a concert in Raleigh, North Carolina, for allegedly hitting a fan. Media reports state the incident occurred after Rivera was hit on her right leg with a beer can that was thrown by someone in the crowd. Rivera made the culprit climb up on stage, and allegedly started assaulting him physically and verbally. After the altercation, the fan called the police, and Rivera was arrested after wrapping up the concert. Rivera was detained for a few hours, but released shortly after paying $3,000 bail.

In October 2008, a sex video featuring Rivera began circulating.

Rivera was arrested on May 18, 2009, by customs authorities at the international airport in Mexico City. She failed to declare $52,467 cash in her purse. Rivera later paid a fine of $8,400 and was released. According to New York Daily News, Rivera worked as a performer for drug cartel parties in 2009.

In late 2014, controversy and accusations continued to surround the circumstances of her death. Her widower, Esteban Loaiza, has sued Starwood for wrongful death. A request by his attorneys to dismiss the case was granted in late October, court records show. Loiaza's suit contended the pilots flying Rivera.

Rivera's estate has launched a copyright lawsuit against her former manager Laura Lucio. The plaintiffs are asking a judge to instruct law enforcement officials to confiscate Rivera's writings and interviews from Lucio so she cannot use them for a book project. In January 2014, Lucio filed a lawsuit claiming Rivera's estate published a biography of Rivera using the writings and interviews that she helped put together before Rivera passed. Lucio alleged her book project, Mi Vida Loca, which she claimed to have written with Rivera, was shelved following Rivera's death but was later published under a new title, Unbreakable: My Story, My Way, without her permission. Rivera's estate subsequently had the lawsuit moved out of a state court and into federal court, but in September 2014, U.S. District Judge George Wu granted Lucio's request to have the case moved back to state court. She then published the materials and Rivera's estate are now claiming they are the rightful owners of them. The lawsuit reads, "Defendant even falsely listed herself as the author of these copyrighted works, created by Jenni Rivera and/or owned by Jenni Rivera Enterprises, in a registration of a manuscript titled Jenni Rivera, Mi Vida Loca (My Crazy Life) as told to Laura Lucio; with the Writer's Guild of America's Intellectual Property Registry. Rivera's Estate and Lucio settled the case out of court in September 2015. The terms of the settlement are confidential.

On December 9, 2014, the estate of Rivera sued the owners of the plane that was carrying her. The negligence case is against Starwood Management Inc., which owned the Learjet 25 jet that crashed in northern Mexico, after plunging more than 28,000 feet (8,500 m). The case is also against the companies that serviced the aircraft, Bombardier Inc. and Learjet Inc. Rivera's parents and her five children are plaintiffs in the case. The suit seeks unspecified damages on their behalf. Rivera's estate has also been sued along with Starwood by relatives of those killed in the crash, including her attorney, hairstylist, publicist and makeup artist and one of the plane's pilots.

== Death and funeral ==
Rivera died in an aircraft accident in the early hours of December 9, 2012, when the Learjet 25 she was traveling in with six others crashed near Monterrey, Mexico. She was in the city to perform at Monterrey Arena the previous evening. After holding a press conference at the end of the show, she and four other staff and two pilots departed from Monterrey Airport at around 3:20am local time on December 9 to fly to Toluca, Mexico, for an appearance on La Voz, a Mexican singing competition TV series. Around 15 minutes later, contact with the jet was lost, and later in the day its wreckage was found near Iturbide, Nuevo León. There were no survivors.

A public memorial service was held at the Gibson Amphitheatre on December 19, 2012. Rivera was buried on December 31, 2012, at All Souls Cemetery in Long Beach, California. Her father told Telemundo that legal issues had caused this delay. Her death made international headlines for weeks.

The investigation by the Mexican authorities, assisted by the U.S. National Transportation Safety Board, (normal protocol when a U.S. aircraft or U.S. citizen is affected) was closed in December 2014, without determining the cause of the crash. The aircraft had completely disintegrated after hitting the ground in a nosedive at speeds of approximately 1,000 mph (1,600 km/h), and the flight recorder was destroyed in the impact, while the cockpit voice recorder was never found. The probable cause was stated to be "loss of control of the aircraft for undetermined reasons."

=== Reactions ===
Stories of Rivera's disappearance and death appeared on Telemundo and Univisión, the United States' leading Spanish-language networks, as well as CNN, MSNBC, ABC and near the top of The New York Times website. Shortly after her death, CNN en Español reported that Rivera started to become more known internationally, with her name trending on Twitter worldwide and a surge of sales in her albums being bought from people outside of Mexico and the United States.

Universal Music Group (Fonovisa's Parent Company) also released a statement, saying: "The entire Universal Music Group family is deeply saddened by the sudden loss of our dear friend Jenni Rivera. The world rarely sees someone who has had such a profound impact on so many. From her incredibly versatile talent to the way she embraced her fans around the world, Jenni was simply incomparable. Her talent will be missed; but her gift of music will be with us always." United States Senator Marco Rubio made a statement about Rivera's life and death on the Senate floor, where he said Rivera was "a real American success story". Celebrities such as Mario Lopez and Gloria Estefan tweeted their condolences to Rivera's family.

== Cultural impact ==
Jenni Rivera was one of the early women in the industry to sing narcocorridos. Her music centered on testimonies of gender nonconformity. She was also one of the few women, at the time, who openly sang about “non-traditional” behaviors among women. Feminist media scholar, Yessica Garcia Hernandez, describes the way Latinas party, celebrate, sing, undress, and mourn Jenni’s music are ways they are rejecting the “obedient womanhood”. Hernandez further argues how Jenni's music allows Latina women express a different way of love and pleasure for themselves.

For instance, her song “La Chacalosa” led to a rise in popular online social groups for women who self-identified as behaving in non-traditional modes. This gave women a space to express their anti-patriarchal forms of femininity through a more progressive lens. In another example, Jenni said in an interview that her song “Las Malandrinas” “...paid homage to her female fans… The type of girls that go clubbing, drink lots of tequila and stand up for themselves.”

Rivera's music was a source of empowerment for young Latinas and Chicanas who saw their stories reflected in her music. Through songs such as “La Gran Senora” girls can reflect on their relationships with their mothers who may have gone through relationship problems such as infidelity, single parenthood, social stigma.

Additionally, Rivera's fans, as reported by Arlen Davila in Contemporary Latina/o Media: Production, Circulation, Politics, “played her music to transmit undisciplined desires, endorse immigrants civil rights, and protest women’s abuse.”

== Posthumous honors ==
=== Award ceremonies ===
On the 25th anniversary of Premio Lo Nuestro, Univision dedicated the awards ceremony to her. She received a tribute by various artists singing the songs that she performed. She was awarded five awards, including Artist of the Year. At the 2013 Latin Billboard Music Awards she was posthumously awarded seven awards, including Artist of the Year. Her brother, Juan Rivera, performed one of her songs titled "No Llega el Olvido" at the ceremony.

=== The Grammy Museum ===
On May 12, 2013, The Grammy Museum opened new exhibits dedicated to her. On display were a broad array of items including stage costumes she had worn, her personal bible, her driver's license, credit cards, rare photographs of her both on and off stage, handwritten notes, award trophies, ticket stubs, concert posters, tour books, fan memorabilia, and video footage from live performances and television appearances. A spokesman from The Grammy Museum told The Los Angeles Times that the exhibit had become one of the most popular attractions in the museum's five-year history. The spokesman also stated that this was the first exhibition that the museum has devoted entirely to a Latino or Latin American artist. The exhibit was closed on May 11, 2014.

=== Jenni Rivera Memorial Park ===
Jenni Rivera was a true Long Beach legend. Her music, and her many philanthropic contributions, touched so many people in our city and around the world. Naming this park after Jenni honors the legacy of one of our city’s most inspiring native daughters.

— Robert Garcia, Mayor of Long Beach, California

On October 8, 2014, Long Beach, California Councilman Dee Andrews pushed to name a park in memorial of Rivera. Andrews proposed to name a public right of way park in central Long Beach at Walnut Avenue and 20th Street the “Jenni Rivera Memorial Park.” The request was heard at the following City Council's meeting. The agenda item was cosponsored by Councilwoman Suzie Price and Councilman Roberto Uranga. Councilman Andrews said, "Jenni was an inspiration to us all. By honoring Jenni Rivera with a Memorial Park, the City of Long Beach will be paying tribute to a great citizen of our city who was a remarkable entertainer, inspirational leader and an amazing ambassador of all of Long Beach.” Andrews’ office released a written statement from the Rivera family in regard to the park name proposal, stating, “We are honored and humbled to have a great community asset named after our mother, daughter and sister in the greatest City of the world. Jenni always considered herself a chic from Long Beach with pride, no matter how many millions of albums she sold. She always knew she’d return to her hometown, but this exceeded her dreams. We are forever grateful.”

On October 17, 2014, The Long Beach City Council voted 8–0 in favor of moving forward with 6th District Councilmember Dee Andrews's item requesting the Council consider naming a park in the 6th District in honor of Rivera.

On July 2, 2016, Long Beach city officials hosted a grand opening ceremony of the park. The ceremony featured a 125-foot-long (38 m) mural of Rivera.

=== Hollywood Walk Of Fame ===
In 2024, Jenni Rivera received a star on the Hollywood Walk of Fame.

=== Jenni Rivera Performing Arts Center ===
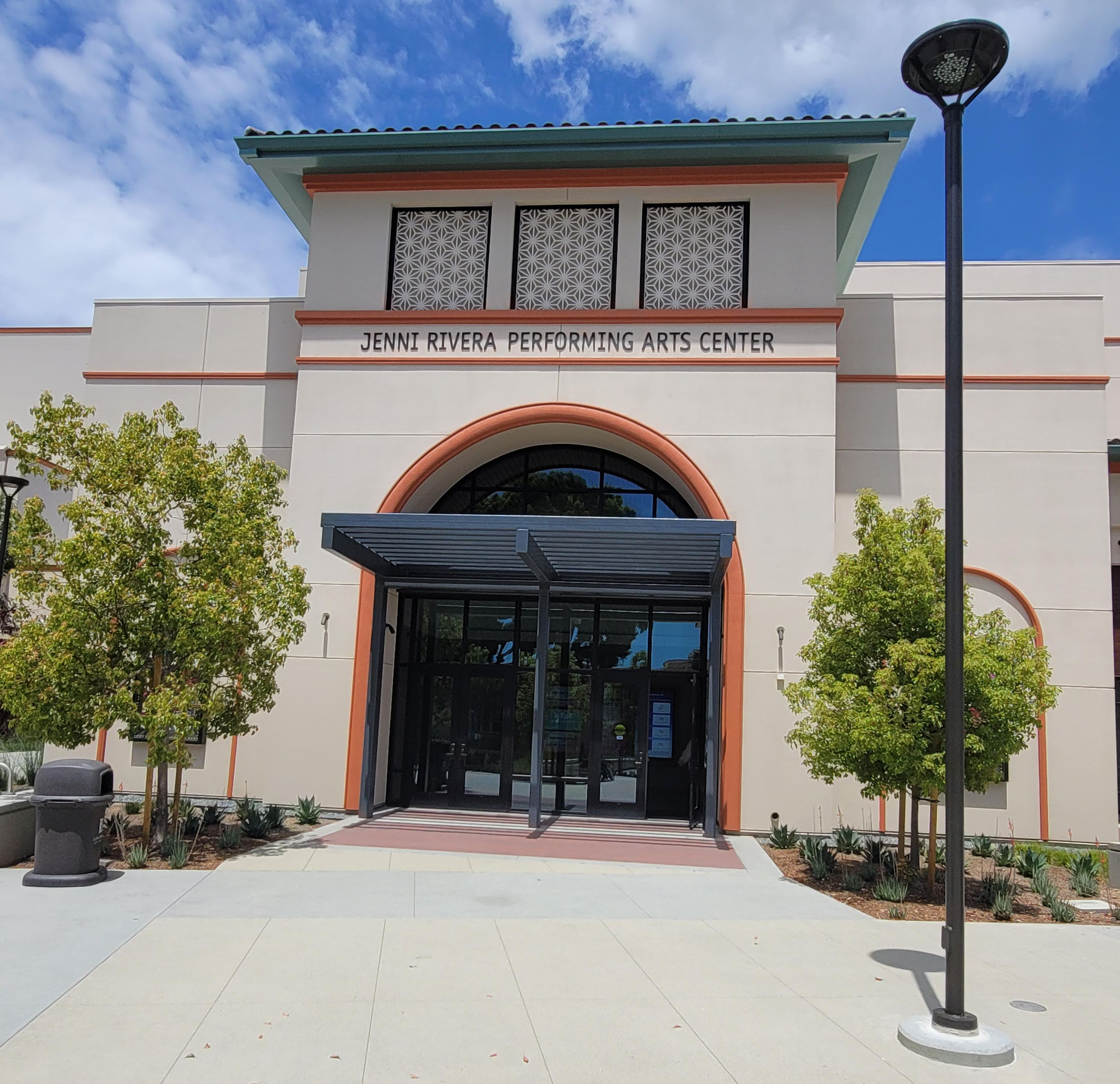
The Jenni Rivera Performing Arts Center at the Long Beach City College Liberal Arts Campus

In 2026, the Long Beach City College opened a new performing arts center at its Liberal Arts Campus and named the center after Rivera. In exchange for the naming, Jenni Rivera Enterprises committed to donating $2 million to the college's foundation over the course of a decade. During the grand opening ceremony on March 26, two of Rivera's daughters, Jacqie and Chiquis, participated in the inaugural performance. Jacqie commented that her mother's life story has been one of resilience, not of perfection.

== Legacy ==
=== Love Foundation ===
Rivera was known for giving back to the community. She used her Love Foundation to help women and children that went through domestic violence, sexual, physical, or emotional abuse.

In 2012, Rivera was honored at Children's Hospital Los Angeles with a spot on the "wall of fame" for her continued support and donations to the hospital. After her death, the foundation continues to help women and children in need through refuge centers, fundraisers, and more.

=== Jenni Vive ===
Jenni Vive is an annual fundraiser and tribute concert hosted by the Jenni Rivera Love Foundation. The first Jenni Vive event was held on December 9, 2013, in Arena Monterrey, the same arena Rivera had sold out in her last concert exactly a year before. Performers included Rivera's family and friends, such as Larry Hernandez, Tito El Bambino, Diana Reyes and La Original Banda Limon. The second event was held on July 2, 2015, in Long Beach, California. Performers included the singer's daughters, Chiquis and Jacqie, Latin pop artist Becky G, Banda Los Recoditos, Los Tucanes de Tijuana, Los Horóscopos de Durango, and Regulo Caro. All earnings from Jenni Vive events go to the Jenni Rivera Love Foundation.

I remember having conversations with my mom talking about that she wanted to convert our house in Corona into a women's shelter. That was her dream. I mean this was in 2001.

— Chiquis Rivera, Jenni's daughter, at the opening of Jenni's Refuge.

=== Jenni's Refuge ===
In May 2016, The Jenni Rivera Love Foundation, in partnership with New Life Beginnings, opened Jenni's Refuge, a women and children's refuge center in Long Beach, California. The refuge center is dedicated to helping women and children that have gone through domestic violence, physical, emotional, or sexual abuse. Jenni's Refuge was built with earnings from Jenni Vive 2015.

=== Tequila La Gran Señora ===
In 2009, Rivera began work on her own tequila. Rivera partnered with 3 Crowns Distributors, planned, tasted, and approved the tequila from 2009 to 2012. The tequila was released in September 2013 as Tequila La Gran Señora. In 2014, Tequila La Gran Señora won Best in Class for its versions in Blanco and Reposado. It also took a Tequila Añejo Gold award for its Añejo form. It took the award from Don Julio. Rivera's Tequila has appeared in music videos from her daughter, Chiquis, to fellow celebrities such as Mario "El Cachorro" Delgado, Snow The Product, and more.

In July 2016, at Noche de La Gran Señora, an event celebrating Rivera's birthday, Rivera's family presented a new bottle of Tequila La Gran Señora. The bottle was approved by Rivera herself. The new bottle was expected to go on sale in late 2016.

=== Biopic Film ===
Rivera is the subject of a ViX biographical film, Jenni (2024) directed by Gigi Saul Guerrero and starring Annie Gonzalez in the title role, with J. R. Villarreal playing Juan 'Cinco' Lopez. Gonzalez received approval from Rivera's children after singing to them on zoom.

== Bibliography ==
On July 2, 2013, Rivera's family released Unbreakable: My Story, My Way by Rivera. A New York Times bestseller, the Spanish-language paperback sold over 9,000 copies in its first week with the English-language hardcover and paperback editions selling over 10,000 copies combined.

== Discography ==
=== Studio albums ===
- Somos Rivera (1992)
- La Maestra (1993)
- Por Un Amor (1994)
- Poco A Poco (1994)
- Adiós... A Selena (1995)
- Si Quieres Verme Llorar (1999)
- Reyna de Reynas (1999)
- Que Me Entierren Con la Banda (2000)
- Déjate Amar (2001)
- Se las Voy a Dar a Otro (2001)
- Homenaje a Las Grandes (2003)
- Parrandera, Rebelde y Atrevida (2005)
- Mi Vida Loca (2007)
- Jenni (2008)
- La Gran Señora (2009)
- Joyas Prestadas: Pop (2011)
- Joyas Prestadas: Banda (2011)
- Misión Cumplida (2023; posthumously released)

== Filmography ==
=== Film ===
| Year | Title | Role | Notes |
|---|---|---|---|
| 1994 | La Dinastía De Los Perez | Cantante Palenque | Cameo |
| 2013 | Filly Brown | María Tenorio | Acting debut (posthumous release) |

=== Television ===
==== Appearances as self in life ====
| Year | Title | Role | Notes |
|---|---|---|---|
| 2004-2012 | Premios de la Radio | herself | Honoree |
| 2007-2011 | Lo Nuestro Awards | herself | Honoree |
| 2007 and 2009 | Sábado Gigante | herself | Music performer guest |
| 2007 and 2011 | El Show de Cristina | herself | Music performer guest |
| 2008 and 2010 | Latin Grammy Awards | herself | Music performer guest |
| 2010 | Jenni Rivera Presents: Chiquis & Raq-C | herself | Mun2 reality TV show about Jenni Rivera's daughter and her friend, Jenni Rivera appeared in and produced |
| 2011 | El Show de Jenni Rivera | herself | Host her own show and interview other celebrities After a couple of episodes she decided to cancel the show |
| 2011 | Eva Luna | herself | Singer |
| 2011-2013 | I Love Jenni | herself | Mun2 reality TV show about Jenni Rivera's life, also produced by Jenni Rivera |
| 2012 | Chiquis 'N Control | herself | Mun2 reality TV show about daughter Chiquis. Rivera executive produced. |
| 2012 | La Voz... México | herself (coach and judge) | Season 2 |
| 2012 | Billboard Latin Music Awards | herself | Music performer guest |
| 2016 | The Riveras | herself | NBC Universo reality TV show about Rivera's children. Features archive footage of Rivera. |

==== Tribute concerts, concert films, and biographical programming ====
| Year | Title | Role | Notes |
|---|---|---|---|
| 2010 | La Gran Señora en Vivo | herself | Televised concert at the Nokia Theatre in August 2010. This is the only film created during her lifetime. |
| 2013 | La Diva en Concierto | herself | Televised concert that was filmed in November 2011 |
| 2014 | La Vida de una Diva | herself | Documentary |
| 2017 | Su Nombre Era Dolores | — | Biographical telenovela starring Luz Ramos |
| 2017 | Mariposa de Barrio | — | Biographical telenovela starring Angelica Celaya |

== See also ==
- Honorific nicknames in popular music
- List of Billboard Social 50 number-one artists
- List of fatalities from aviation accidents
- List of best-selling Latin music artists
- Jenni Rivera Fashion
- Women in Latin music
