= Billboard Latin Music Award for Top Latin Album of the Year =

Annual American music award

- Current: 2024 Billboard Latin Music Awards
- Awarded for: the best performing Latin albums in Billboard magazine
- Country: United States
- Presented by: Billboard
- First award: 2008
- Final award: 2024
- Currently held by: Nadie Sabe Lo Que Va a Pasar Mañana by Bad Bunny (2024)

Highlights
- Most awards: Bad Bunny (3)
- Most nominations: Bad Bunny (6)
- Website: billboardevents.com

The Billboard Latin Music Award for Top Latin Album of the Year is an honor presented annually at the Billboard Latin Music Awards, a ceremony which honors "the most popular albums, songs, and performers in Latin music, as determined by the actual sales, radio airplay, online streaming and social data that informs Billboard's weekly charts." The award is given to the best performing albums on Billboard's Top Latin Albums chart, which measures the most popular Spanish-language recordings in the United States based on a multi-metric system that blends sales and album-equivalent units. The list was established by the magazine on July 10, 1993 and was originally based on album sales until February 11, 2017. From 1994 to 2007, each music genre's field (pop, tropical, Regional Mexican, jazz, rap, and reggaeton) had their own Album of the Year category, separated between male, female, and duo or group categories.

Bad Bunny is the most awarded act in the category with three wins. Bad Bunny is also the most nominated artist, with six. Jenni Rivera, Juan Gabriel, Ozuna, and Bad Bunny are the only acts with two nominated albums in the same year, a milestone achieved twice by Rivera. Bad Bunny is the only act to also have a total of three albums nominated in the same year (2021). Bad Bunny has won Top Latin Album of the Year three times in a row, with Juan Gabriel winning twice in a row. In 2023 Karol G became the first female artist to win this award. As of 2024, the holder is Bad Bunny for the album Nadie Sabe Lo Que Va a Pasar Mañana.

== Recipients ==
Year	Performing artist(s)	Work	Nominees	Ref.
2008	Daddy Yankee	El Cartel: The Big Boss	Camila – Todo Cambió; Jennifer Lopez – Como Ama Una Mujer; Wisin & Yandel – Los Extraterrestres	
2009	Enrique Iglesias	Enrique Iglesias: 95/08 Éxitos	Aventura – Kings of Bachata: Sold Out at Madison Square Garden; Flex – Te Quiero: Romantic Style in da World; Maná – Arde El Cielo	
2010	Aventura	The Last	El Trono de México – Almas Gemelas; Tito El Bambino – El Patrón; Wisin & Yandel – La Revolución	
2011	Enrique Iglesias	Euphoria	Camila – Dejarte de Amar; Marc Anthony – Íconos; Shakira – Sale El Sol	
2012	Prince Royce	Prince Royce	Cristian Castro – Viva El Príncipe; Maná – Drama y Luz; Romeo Santos – Fórmula, Vol. 1	
2013	Romeo Santos	Fórmula, Vol. 1	Jenni Rivera – Joyas Prestadas; Jenni Rivera – La Misma Gran Señora; Prince Royce – Phase II	
2014	Marc Anthony	3.0	Alejandro Fernández – Confidencias; Jenni Rivera – Joyas Prestadas; Jenni Rivera – La Misma Gran Señora"	
2015	Romeo Santos	Fórmula, Vol. 2	Enrique Iglesias – Sex and Love; Santana – Corazón; Various – Las Bandas Románticas de América 2014	
2016	Juan Gabriel	Los Dúo	Gerardo Ortíz – Hoy Más Fuerte; Maná – Cama Incendiada; Ricky Martin – A Quien Quiera Escuchar	
2017	Juan Gabriel	Los Dúo 2	Banda Sinaloense MS – Qué Bendición; Juan Gabriel – Vestido de Etiqueta por Eduardo Magallanes; Los Plebes del Rancho – Recuerden Mi Estilo	
2018	Nicky Jam	Fénix	J Balvin – Energía; Ozuna – Odisea; Shakira – El Dorado	
2019	Ozuna	Odisea	Anuel AA – Real Hasta La Muerte; J Balvin – Vibras; Ozuna – Aura	
2020	Bad Bunny	X 100pre	J Balvin & Bad Bunny - Oasis; Luis Fonsi - Vida; Sech - Sueños	
2021	Bad Bunny	YHLQMDLG	Anuel AA - Emmanuel; Bad Bunny - El Último Tour Del Mundo; Bad Bunny - Las que no iban a salir; Maluma - Papi Juancho	
2022	Bad Bunny	Un Verano Sin Ti	Farruko - La 167; J Balvin - Jose; Karol G - KG0516; Rauw Alejandro - Vice Versa	
2023	Karol G	Mañana Será Bonito	Fuerza Regida - Pa Que Hablen; Iván Cornejo - Dañado; Peso Pluma - Génesis; Rauw Alejandro - Saturno	
2024	Bad Bunny	Nadie Sabe Lo Que Va a Pasar Mañana	Karol G - Mañana Será Bonito (Bichota Season); Junior H - $ad Boyz 4 Life II; Grupo Frontera - El Comienzo; Fuerza Regida - Pa Las Baby's y Belikeada	

== Records ==
=== Most nominations ===
Nominations	Act
7	Bad Bunny
4	Jenni Rivera
4	J Balvin
3	Enrique Iglesias
3	Juan Gabriel
3	Karol G
3	Maná
3	Ozuna
3	Romeo Santos
2	Aventura
2	Camila
2	Marc Anthony
2	Prince Royce
2	Shakira
2	Wisin & Yandel
2	Anuel AA
2	Fuerza Regida
2	Rauw Alejandro

=== Most awards ===
Awards	Act
4	Bad Bunny
2	Enrique Iglesias
2	Juan Gabriel
2	Romeo Santos

== See also ==
- Billboard Music Award for Top Latin Album
- Latin Grammy Award for Album of the Year
