= List of Billboard Regional Mexican Albums number ones of 2014 =

Regional Mexican Albums is a record chart published in Billboard magazine that features Latin music sales information for regional styles of Mexican music. This data are compiled by Nielsen SoundScan from a sample that includes music stores, music departments at department stores and verifiable sales from concert venues in the United States.

== Number-one albums ==
Issue date	Album	Artist(s)	Reference(s)
January 4	1969 – Siempre, En Vivo Desde Monterrey, Parte 1	Jenni Rivera	
January 11	1969 – Siempre, En Vivo Desde Monterrey, Parte 1	Jenni Rivera	
January 18	1969 – Siempre, En Vivo Desde Monterrey, Parte 1	Jenni Rivera	
January 25	1969 – Siempre, En Vivo Desde Monterrey, Parte 1	Jenni Rivera	
February 1	1969 – Siempre, En Vivo Desde Monterrey, Parte 1	Jenni Rivera	
February 8	Las Bandas Romanticas de America	Various Artists	
February 15	Las Bandas Romanticas de America	Various Artists	
February 22	Las Bandas Romanticas de America	Various Artists	
March 1	Las Bandas Romanticas de America	Various Artists	
March 8	Las Bandas Romanticas de America	Various Artists	
March 15	Las Bandas Romanticas de America	Various Artists	
March 22	Las Bandas Romanticas de America	Various Artists	
March 29	Las Bandas Romanticas de America	Various Artists	
April 5	Corridos Time, Season One: Soy Parrandero	Los Tucanes de Tijuana	
April 12	Globall	3BallMTY	
April 19	En Vivo	Siggno	
April 26	Las Bandas Romanticas de America	Various Artists	
May 3	Las Bandas Romanticas de America	Various Artists	
May 10	Mi Nina	Roberto Tapia	
May 17	Mi Nina	Roberto Tapia	
May 24	Mis 40 en Bellas Artes	Juan Gabriel	
May 31	Mis 40 en Bellas Artes	Juan Gabriel	
June 7	Mis 40 en Bellas Artes	Juan Gabriel	
June 14	Mis 40 en Bellas Artes	Juan Gabriel	
June 21	Contigo	Calibre 50	
June 28	La Balanza	Noel Torres	
July 5	La Balanza	Noel Torres	
July 12	De Alumno A Maestro	Remmy Valenzuela	
July 19	1969 – Siempre, En Vivo Desde Monterrey, Parte 2	Jenni Rivera	
July 26	1969 – Siempre, En Vivo Desde Monterrey, Parte 2	Jenni Rivera	
August 2	1969 – Siempre, En Vivo Desde Monterrey, Parte 2	Jenni Rivera	
August 9	1969 – Siempre, En Vivo Desde Monterrey, Parte 2	Jenni Rivera	
August 16	1969 – Siempre, En Vivo Desde Monterrey, Parte 2	Jenni Rivera	
August 23	Alegre y Enamorado	El Dasa	
August 30	1969 – Siempre, En Vivo Desde Monterrey, Parte 2	Jenni Rivera	
September 6	1969 – Siempre, En Vivo Desde Monterrey, Parte 2	Jenni Rivera	
September 13	Directo 93-13, Vol. 1	Pesado	
September 20	Sueno XXX	Banda Los Recoditos	
September 27	Sueno XXX	Banda Los Recoditos	
October 4	Mi Vida En Vida	Remmy Valenzuela	
October 11	El Fenomeno	La Maquinaria Nortena	
October 18	Quiero ser tu dueño	Luis Coronel	
October 25	Quiero ser tu dueño	Luis Coronel	
November 1	Realidades	Los Tigres del Norte	
November 8	Realidades	Los Tigres del Norte	
November 15	Senzu-Rah	Regulo Caro	
November 22	Radio Exitos: El Disco del Ano 2014	Various Artists	
November 29	Realidades	Los Tigres del Norte	
December 6	Radio Exitos: El Disco del Ano 2014	Various Artists	
December 13	Radio Exitos: El Disco del Ano 2014	Various Artists	
December 20	1 Vida – 3 Historias: Metamorfosis – Despedida de Culiacán – Jenni Vive 2013	Jenni Rivera	
December 27	1 Vida – 3 Historias: Metamorfosis – Despedida de Culiacán – Jenni Vive 2013	Jenni Rivera	
