= List of number-one Billboard Latin Albums from the 2010s =

The Billboard Top Latin Albums chart, published by Billboard magazine, is a record chart that ranks the performance of Latin music albums in the United States. The data is compiled by Nielsen SoundScan from a sample that includes music stores, music departments at electronics and department stores, Internet sales (both physical and digital) and verifiable sales from concert venues in the United States. On the week ending January 31, 2017, Billboard updated the methodology to compile the Top Latin Albums chart into a multi-metric methodology to include track equivalent album units and streaming equivalent album units.

The first number-one album of the decade was Dos Mundos: Evolución by Mexican singer Alejandro Fernández. The following number-one album was The Last by Aventura, which spent six non-consecutive weeks at the top of the chart in 2010 and ended the year as the best-selling Latin album in the United States. Euphoria, a bilingual album released by Spanish singer-songwriter Enrique Iglesias, peaked at number ten in the Billboard 200 chart and spent eleven weeks at the top of the Latin Albums chart. Iglesias earned the Latin Artist of the Year award at the 2011 Billboard Latin Music Awards, a category that combines both sales and airplay, while the aforementioned album won for Latin Album and Latin Pop Album of the Year. Also in 2010, Poquita Ropa by Guatemalan performer Ricardo Arjona debuted atop the chart and also peaked at number one in Mexico. That same year, Mexican singer-songwriter Marco Antonio Solís reached the top of the chart for the tenth time with his studio album En Total Plenitud, the most for any performer. The album received four nominations for the 12th Latin Grammy Awards.

Ricky Martin gained his sixth number-one album on the chart, Música + Alma + Sexo, in February 2011. The album also reached a peak of number three on the Billboard 200. In 2011, Mexican singer Gerardo Ortíz peaked for the first time at number one in the chart with the live album Morir y Existir: En Vivo, two weeks after surviving an ambush attempt in Mexico that left his cousin and business manager dead. Ortíz reached number one for the second time with the album Entre Dios y el Diablo, also in 2011. One notable feat that year was accomplished by Latin pop star Prince Royce, whose self-titled debut album reached the top of the chart 58 weeks after its release. Likewise in 2011, Mexican rock band Maná debuted atop the chart with their eight studio album Drama y Luz, while its lead single "Lluvia al Corazón" also debuted at number one on the Billboard Hot Latin Songs chart.

== Number one albums ==
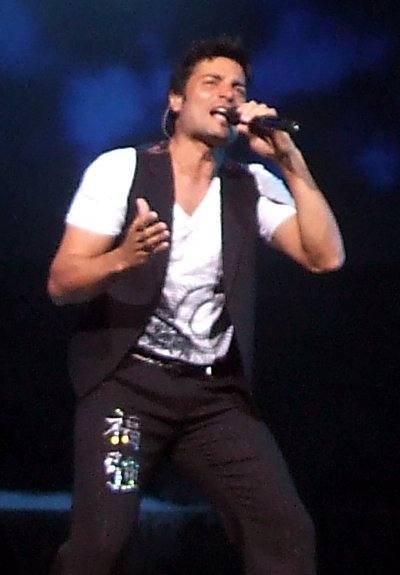
Puerto Rican recording artist Chayanne landed two number-one albums during the 2010s decade with No Hay Imposibles (2010), and En Todo Estaré (2014).

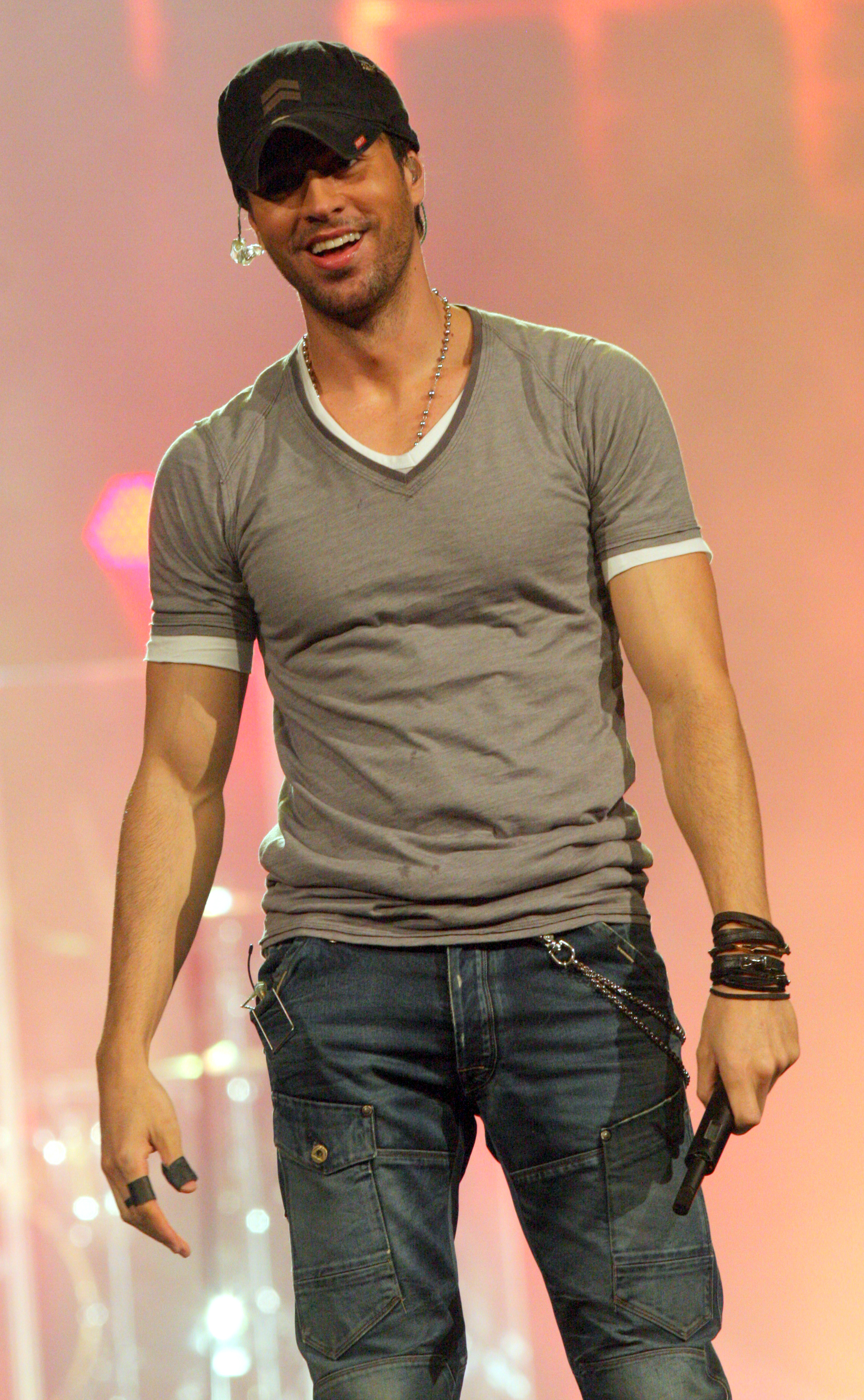
Spanish pop star Enrique Iglesias reached number-one on the Billboard Top Latin Albums chart this decade with Euphoria in 2010, and Sex and Love between 2014 and 2015.

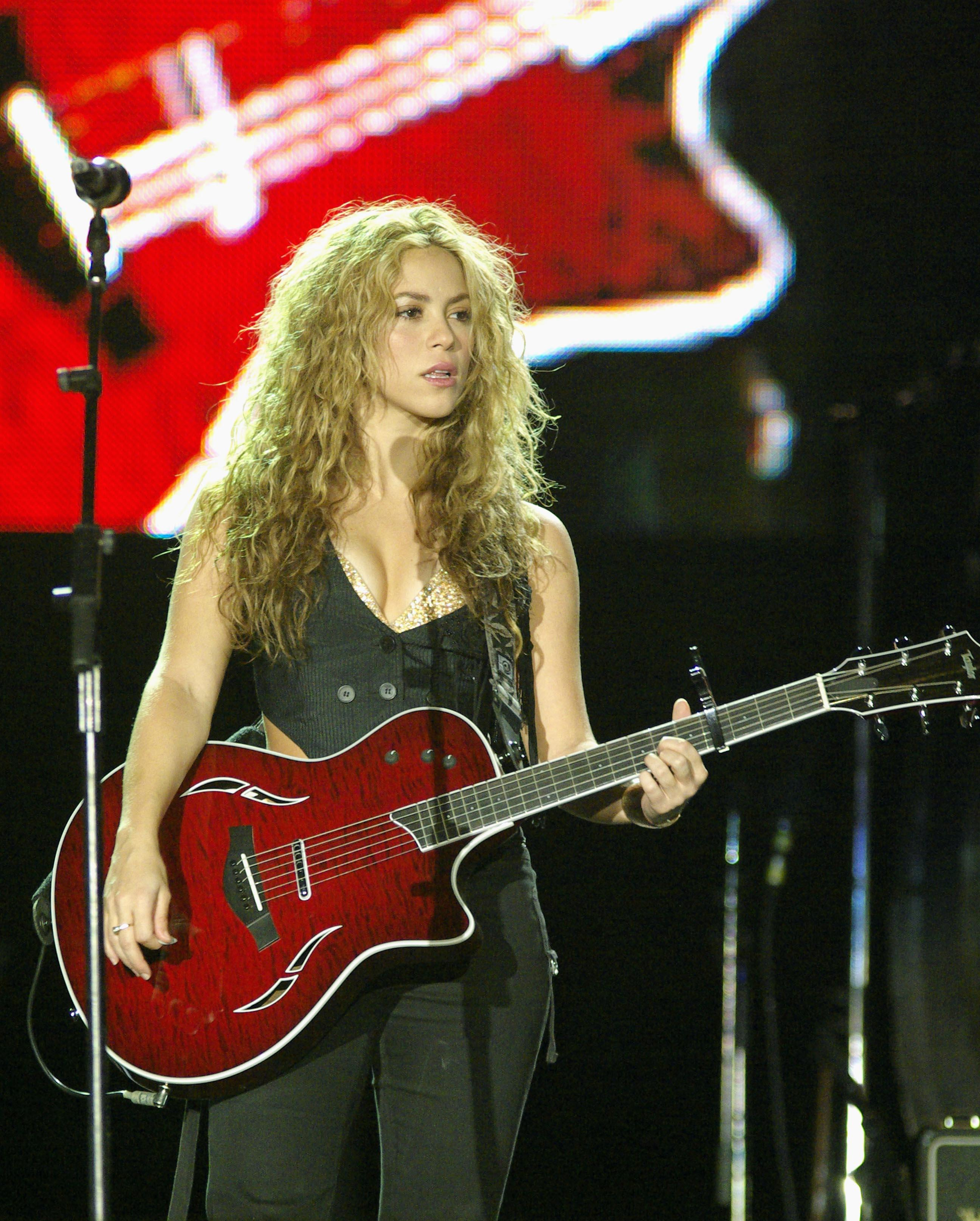
Colombian singer-songwriter Shakira released her fifth number-one album Sale el Sol in 2010 and her sixth in 2017, El Dorado

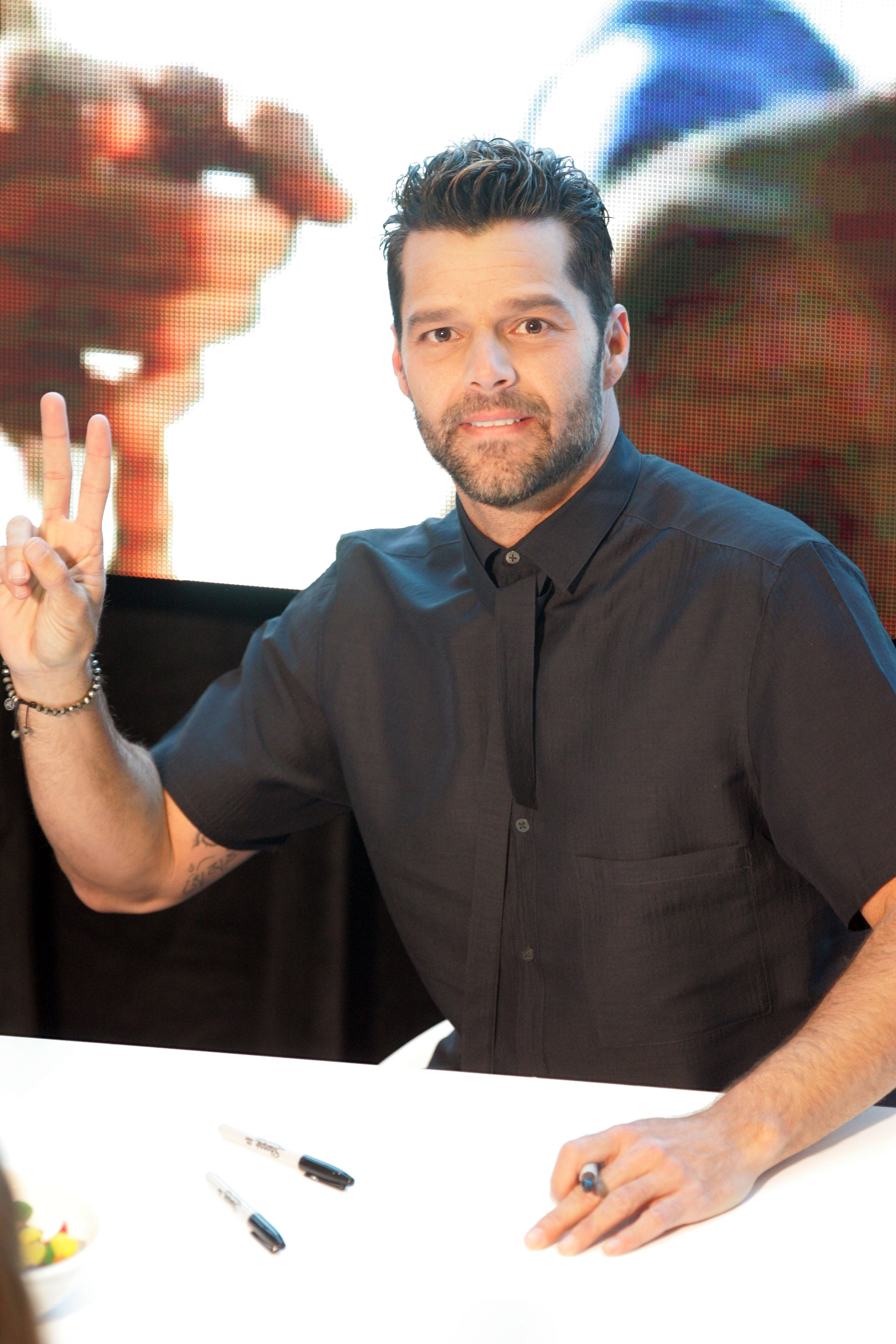
Puerto Rican pop star Ricky Martin gained his sixth number-one album on the chart, Música + Alma + Sexo, in February 2011. Martin later earned his seventh No. 1 album on the chart with A Quien Quiera Escuchar in 2015.

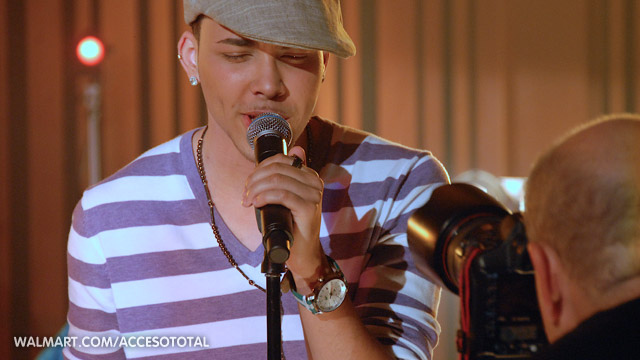
Dominican-American singer Prince Royce had his debut album 58 weeks in the chart before hitting number one

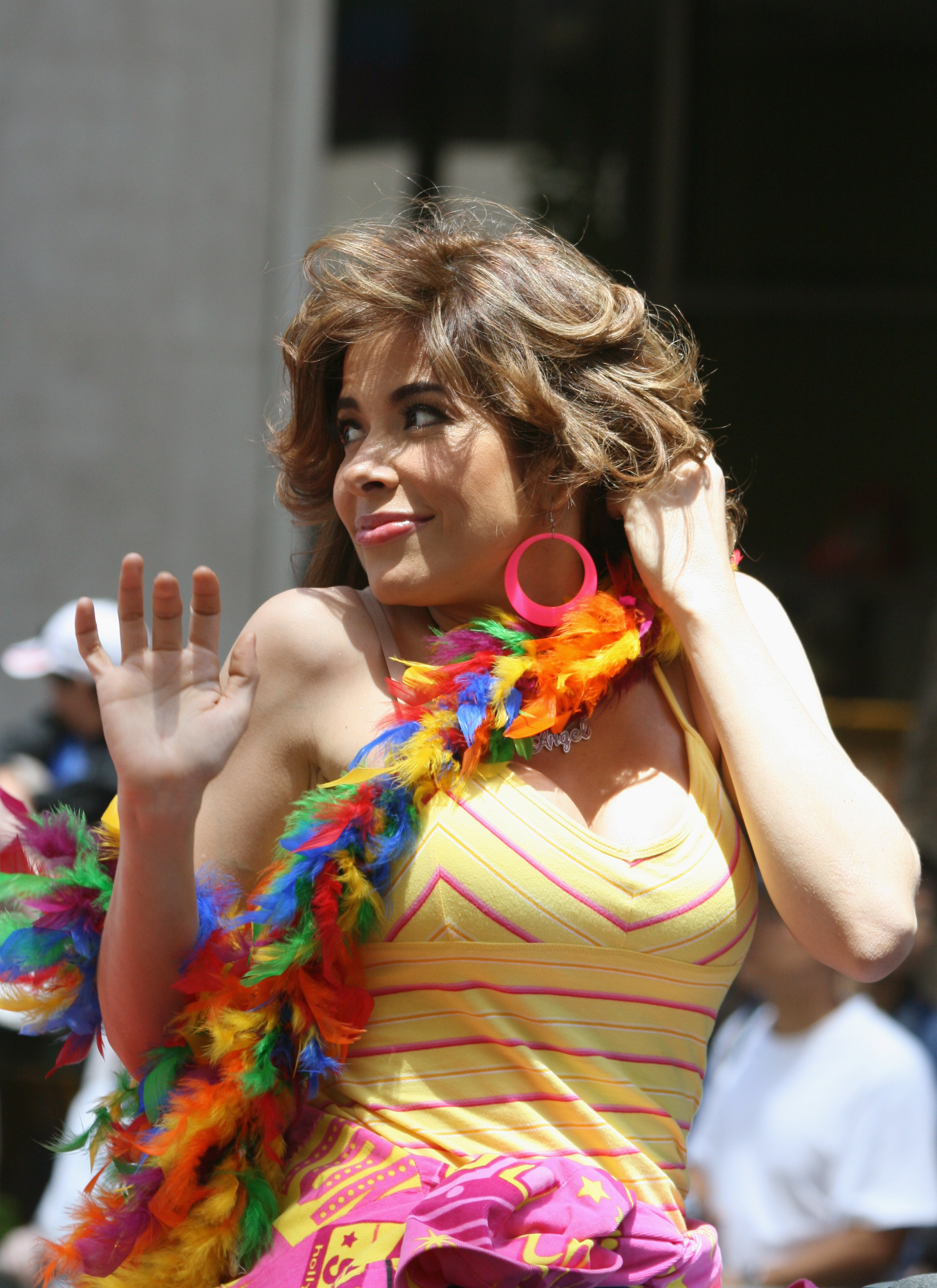
Mexican performer Gloria Trevi debuted and peaked at number one with her albums Gloria (2011), El Amor (2015), Inmortal (2016) and Versus (2017)

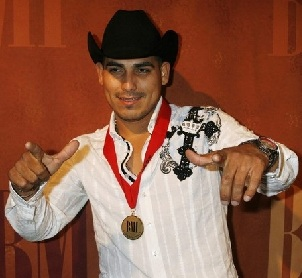
Singer-songwriter Espinoza Paz peaked at number-one for the second time with his album Canciones Que Duelen in 2011

Key

† – Best-selling Latin album of the year

Artist	Album	Reached number one	Weeks at number one
Alejandro Fernández	Dos Mundos: Evolución	January 2, 2010	1
Aventura	The Last †	January 9, 2010	4
Banda Los Recoditos	¡Ando Bien Pedo!	February 6, 2010	1
Aventura	The Last †	February 13, 2010	2
Camila	Dejarte de Amar	February 27, 2010	2
Chayanne	No Hay Imposibles	March 13, 2010	2
The Chieftains featuring Ry Cooder	San Patricio	March 13, 2010	4
Duelo	Solamente Tú	April 24, 2010	1
El Trono de México	Quiero Decirte Que Te Amo	May 1, 2010	2
Daddy Yankee	Mundial	May 15, 2010	4
Marc Anthony	Iconos	June 12, 2010	6
Enrique Iglesias	Euphoria	July 24, 2010	7
Ricardo Arjona	Poquita Ropa	September 11, 2010	1
Enrique Iglesias	Euphoria	September 18, 2010	2
Luis Miguel	Luis Miguel	October 2, 2010	1
Enrique Iglesias	Euphoria	October 9, 2010	2
Vicente Fernández	El Hombre Que Más Te Amó	October 23, 2010	1
Marco Antonio Solís	En Total Plenitud	October 30, 2010	1
Shakira	Sale el Sol	November 6, 2010	8
Artist	Album	Reached number one	Weeks at number one
Shakira	Sale el Sol	January 1, 2011	4
Cristian Castro	Viva el príncipe	January 29, 2011	2
Wisin & Yandel	Los Vaqueros: El Regreso	February 12, 2011	1
Ricky Martin	Música + Alma + Sexo	February 19, 2011	2
Cristian Castro	Viva el príncipe	March 5, 2011	5
Gloria Trevi	Gloria	April 9, 2011	1
Gerardo Ortíz	Morir y Existir: En Vivo	April 16, 2011	1
Prince Royce	Prince Royce †	April 23, 2011	1
Maná	Drama y Luz	April 30, 2011	7
Aventura	14 + 14	June 18, 2011	1
Maná	Drama y Luz	June 25, 2011	2
Jencarlos Canela	Un Nuevo Día	July 9, 2011	1
Luis Fonsi	Tierra Firme	July 16, 2011	3
Prince Royce	Prince Royce †	August 6, 2011	4
Various artists	Puros Trankazos	September 3, 2011	3
Gerardo Ortíz	Entre Dios y el Diablo	September 24, 2011	3
Espinoza Paz	Canciones Que Duelen	October 15, 2011	1
Ricardo Arjona	Independiente	October 22, 2011	2
Chino & Nacho	Supremo	November 5, 2011	1
Charlie Zaa	De Bohemia	November 12, 2011	1
Cristian Castro	Mi Amigo El Príncipe	November 19, 2011	1
Romeo Santos	Formula, Vol. 1	November 26, 2011	6
Artist	Album	Reached number one	Weeks at number one
Romeo Santos	Formula, Vol. 1 †	January 7, 2012	1
Christian Pagán	De Miles a Uno	January 14, 2012	1
Romeo Santos	Formula, Vol. 1 †	January 21, 2012	3
La Arrolladora Banda el Limón de René Camacho	Irreversible...2012	February 11, 2012	2
Romeo Santos	Formula, Vol. 1 †	February 25, 2012	7
Ednita Nazario	Desnuda	April 14, 2012	1
Selena	Enamorada de Ti	April 21, 2012	1
Prince Royce	Phase II	April 28, 2012	3
Don Omar	Don Omar Presents MTO²: New Generation	May 20, 2012	3
Juanes	MTV Unplugged	June 16, 2012	2
Prince Royce	Phase II	June 30, 2012	2
Marco Antonio Solís	Una Noche de Luna	July 14, 2012	1
Wisin & Yandel	Líderes	July 21, 2012	3
Roberto Tapia	El Muchacho	August 11, 2012	2
Wisin & Yandel	Líderes	August 25, 2012	2
Various artists	Pina Records Presenta: La Formula	September 8, 2012	1
Maná	Exiliados en la Bahía: Lo Mejor de Maná	September 15, 2012	2
Daddy Yankee	Prestige	September 29, 2012	2
Alejandro Sanz	La Música No Se Toca	October 13, 2012	1
Tommy Torres	12 Historias	October 20, 2012	1
Gerardo Ortíz	El Primer Ministro	October 27, 2012	2
Various artists	Radio Éxitos: El Disco del Año 2012	November 10, 2012	1
Tierra Cali	Entrégate	November 17, 2012	1
Romeo Santos	The King Stays King: Sold Out at Madison Square Garden	November 24, 2012	2
Thalía	Habítame Siempre	December 8, 2012	1
Tito El Bambino	Invicto	December 15, 2012	1
Various artists	Hecho Con Sabor a Puerto Rico	December 22, 2012	1
Jenni Rivera	La Misma Gran Señora	December 29, 2012	1
Artist	Album	Reached number one	Weeks at number one
Jenni Rivera	La Misma Gran Señora†	January 5, 2013	6
Andrea Bocelli	Pasión	February 16, 2013	3
Jenni Rivera	La Misma Gran Señora†	March 9, 2013	1
Jenni Rivera	Joyas Prestadas: Pop	March 16, 2013	2
Julión Álvarez y su Norteño Banda	Tu Amigo Nada Más	March 30, 2013	1
Draco Rosa	Vida	April 6, 2013	1
Gerardo Ortíz	Sold Out: En Vivo Desde el Nokia Theatre L.A. Live	April 13, 2013	1
Intocable	En Peligro de Extinción	April 20, 2013	2
Joan Sebastian	13 Celebrando El 13	May 4, 2013	1
Carlos Vives	Corazón Profundo	May 11, 2013	2
Duelo	Libre por Naturaleza	May 25, 2013	1
Juan Luis Guerra	A Son De Guerra Tour	June 1, 2013	6
Natalie Cole	Natalie Cole en Español	July 13, 2013	3
Roberto Tapia	Lo Mejor de Roberto Tapia	August 3, 2013	1
Marc Anthony	3.0	August 10, 2013	4
Alejandro Fernández	Confidencias	September 14, 2013	5
Marc Anthony	3.0	October 19, 2013	1
Prince Royce	Soy el Mismo	October 26, 2013	2
Marco Antonio Solís	Gracias Por Estar Aqui	November 9, 2013	2
Yandel	De Líder a Leyenda	November 23, 2013	1
Marco Antonio Solís	Gracias Por Estar Aqui	November 30, 2013	1
Arcángel	Sentimiento, Elegancia & Maldad	December 7, 2013	1
Gerardo Ortíz	Archivos de Mi Vida	December 14, 2013	1
Jenni Rivera	1969 - Siempre, En Vivo Desde Monterrey, Parte 1	December 21, 2013	2
Artist	Album	Reached number one	Weeks at number one
Jenni Rivera	1969 - Siempre, En Vivo Desde Monterrey, Parte 1	January 4, 2014	5
Various artists	Las Bandas Románticas de América 2014	February 8, 2014	4
Marc Anthony	3.0	March 8, 2014	1
Romeo Santos	Formula, Vol. 2†	March 15, 2014	3
Enrique Iglesias	Sex and Love	April 5, 2014	1
Romeo Santos	Formula, Vol. 2†	April 12, 2014	5
Ricardo Arjona	Viaje	May 17, 2014	1
Santana	Corazón	May 24, 2014	6
Romeo Santos	Formula, Vol. 2†	July 5, 2014	1
Remmy Valenzuela	De Alumno a Maestro	July 12, 2014	1
Jenni Rivera	1969 - Siempre, En Vivo Desde Monterrey, Parte 2	July 19, 2014	2
Enrique Iglesias	Sex and Love	August 2, 2014	6
Chayanne	En Todo Estaré	September 13, 2014	1
Enrique Iglesias	Sex and Love	September 20, 2014	3
La Maquinaria Norteña	El Fenómeno	October 11, 2014	1
Luis Coronel	Quiero Ser Tu Dueño	October 18, 2014	1
Enrique Iglesias	Sex and Love	October 25, 2014	1
Farruko	Farruko Presenta: Los Menores	November 15, 2014	2
Juan Luis Guerra 440	Todo Tiene Su Hora	November 29, 2014	1
Thalía	Amore Mio	December 6, 2014	1
Enrique Iglesias	Sex and Love	December 13, 2014	1
Jenni Rivera	1 Vida – 3 Historias: Metamorfosis – Despedida de Culiacán – Jenni Vive 2013	December 20, 2014	1
Alejandro Fernández	Confidencias Reales	December 27, 2014	1
Artist	Album	Reached number one	Weeks at number one
Various artists	Qué Lindo es Puerto Rico	January 3, 2015	1
Enrique Iglesias	Sex and Love	January 10, 2015	2
Romeo Santos	Formula, Vol. 2	January 24, 2015	2
Various artists	Las Bandas Románticas de América 2015	February 7, 2015	1
Intocable	XX: 20 Aniversario	February 14, 2015	1
La Arrolladora Banda El Limón de René Camacho	Ojos en Blanco	February 21, 2015	1
Ricky Martin	A Quien Quiera Escuchar	February 28, 2015	1
Juan Gabriel	Los Dúo †	March 7, 2015	5
Julión Álvarez y su Norteño Banda	El Aferrado	April 11, 2015	1
Juan Gabriel	Los Dúo †	April 18, 2015	1
Tony Dize	La Melodía De La Calle, 3rd Season	April 25, 2015	1
Juan Gabriel	Los Dúo †	May 2, 2015	1
Maná	Cama Incendiada	May 9, 2015	2
Alejandro Sanz	Sirope	May 23, 2015	1
Maná	Cama Incendiada	May 30, 2015	1
Gerardo Ortíz	Hoy Más Fuerte	June 6, 2015	2
Chiquis Rivera	Ahora	June 20, 2015	1
Gerardo Ortíz	Hoy Más Fuerte	June 27, 2015	1
Don Omar	The Last Don 2	July 4, 2015	2
Banda El Recodo de Cruz Lizárraga	Mi Vicio Más Grande	July 18, 2015	2
Joan Sebastian	Personalidad	August 1, 2015	1
Pitbull	Dale	August 8, 2015	2
Joan Sebastian	Personalidad	August 22, 2015	1
Carlos Vives	Más + Corazón: Profundo Tour, En Vivo Desde La Bahía de Santa Marta	August 29, 2015	1
Pitbull	Dale	September 5, 2015	1
Gloria Trevi	El Amor	September 12, 2015	1
Banda Sinaloense MS de Sergio Lizárraga	En Vivo: Guadalajara – Monterrey	September 19, 2015	1
Wisin	Los Vaqueros: La Trilogía	September 26, 2015	2
Juan Gabriel	Mis Número 1... 40 Aniversario	October 10, 2015	1
La Maquinaria Norteña	Ya Dime Adiós	October 17, 2015	2
Vicente Fernández	Muriendo de Amor	October 31, 2015	1
Banda Sinaloense MS de Sergio Lizárraga	En Vivo: Guadalajara – Monterrey	November 7, 2015	1
Farruko	Visionary	November 14, 2015	1
Maluma	Pretty Boy, Dirty Boy	November 21, 2015	1
Yandel	Dangerous	November 28, 2015	1
Il Divo	Amor & Pasión	December 5, 2015	1
Calibre 50	Historias de La Calle	December 12, 2015	1
Il Divo	Amor & Pasión	December 19, 2015	1
Jesse & Joy	Un Besito Más	December 26, 2015	1
Artist	Album	Reached number one	Weeks at number one
Juan Gabriel	Los Dúo, Vol. 2 †	January 2, 2016	7
Banda Los Recoditos	Me Está Gustando	February 20, 2016	1
Banda Sinaloense MS de Sergio Lizárraga	Qué Bendición	February 27, 2016	2
Sin Bandera	Una Última Vez	March 12, 2016	1
Banda Sinaloense MS de Sergio Lizárraga	Qué Bendición	March 19, 2016	1
Ariel Camacho y Los Plebes del Rancho	Recuerden Mi Estilo	March 26, 2016	5
Julión Álvarez y Su Norteño Banda	Mis Ídolos, Hoy Mis Amigos!!!	April 30, 2016	1
La Séptima Banda	A Todo Volumen	May 7, 2016	1
Gente de Zona	Visualízate	May 14, 2016	1
Manny Manuel	Pégate de Mi Mambo	May 21, 2016	1
Thalía	Latina	May 28, 2016	1
Ariel Camacho y Los Plebes del Rancho	Recuerden Mi Estilo	June 4, 2016	1
Kany García	Limonada	June 11, 2016	2
La Arrolladora Banda El Limón de René Camacho	Libre Otra Vez	June 25, 2016	1
Gloria Trevi	Inmortal	July 2, 2016	1
Intocable	Highway	July 9, 2016	1
J Balvin	Energía	July 16, 2016	1
Intocable	Highway	July 23, 2016	1
Reik	Des/Amor	July 30, 2016	1
Siggno	Yo Te Esperaré	August 6, 2016	2
La Maquinaria Norteña	Generación Maquinaria Est. 2006	August 20, 2016	2
Juan Gabriel	Vestido de Etiqueta: Por Eduardo Magallanes	September 3, 2016	2
CNCO	Primera Cita	September 17, 2016	1
Juan Gabriel	Los Dúo, Vol. 2 †	September 24, 2016	4
Zion & Lennox	Motivan2	October 22, 2016	1
Juan Gabriel	Los Dúo, Vol. 2 †	October 29, 2016	1
Calibre 50	Desde El Rancho	November 5, 2016	1
Juan Gabriel	Los Dúo, Vol. 2 †	November 12, 2016	1
Jenni Rivera	Paloma Negra Desde Monterrey	November 19, 2016	1
La Energía Norteña	No Hay Quinto Malo	November 26, 2016	1
Juan Gabriel	Los Dúo, Vol. 2 †	December 3, 2016	3
Various artists	De Puerto Rico Para El Mundo	December 24, 2016	2
Artist	Album	Reached number one	Weeks at number one
Various artists	De Puerto Rico Para El Mundo	January 7, 2017	1
Juan Gabriel	Los Dúo, Vol. 2	January 14, 2017	4
Nicky Jam	Fénix	February 11, 2017	5
Prince Royce	Five	March 18, 2017	2
Nicky Jam	Fénix	April 1, 2017	1
Alejandro Fernández	Rompiendo Fronteras	April 8, 2017	1
Nicky Jam	Fénix	April 15, 2017	1
Various artists	Dance Latin No. 1 Hits 2.0: Los Éxitos del Momento	April 22, 2017	6
Juanes	Mis Planes Son Amarte	June 3, 2017	1
Nicky Jam	Fénix	June 10, 2017	1
Various artists	Summer Latin Hits 2017	June 17, 2017	2
Shakira	El Dorado	July 1, 2017	3
Gloria Trevi and Alejandra Guzmán	Versus	July 22, 2017	1
Shakira	El Dorado	July 29, 2017	2
Romeo Santos	Golden	August 12, 2017	5
Ozuna	Odisea	September 16, 2017	16
Artist	Album	Reached number one	Weeks at number one
Ozuna	Odisea	January 3, 2018	16
CNCO	CNCO	April 21, 2018	1
Ozuna	Odisea	April 28, 2018	5
Maluma	F.A.M.E.	June 2, 2018	1
J Balvin	Vibras	June 9, 2018	2
Ozuna	Odisea	June 23, 2018	5
Anuel AA	Real Hasta la Muerte	July 28, 2018	2
Ozuna	Odisea	August 11, 2018	4
Ozuna	Aura	September 8, 2018	17
Artist	Album	Reached number one	Weeks at number one
Bad Bunny	X 100pre	January 5, 2019	6
Luis Fonsi	Vida	February 16, 2019	1
Bad Bunny	X 100pre	February 23, 2019	8
Romeo Santos	Utopía	April 20, 2019	1
Bad Bunny	X 100pre	April 27, 2019	5
Maluma	11:11	June 1, 2019	1
Bad Bunny	X 100pre	June 8, 2019	2
Santana	Africa Speaks	June 22, 2019	1
Bad Bunny	X 100pre	June 29, 2019	2
J Balvin and Bad Bunny	Oasis	July 13, 2019	6
Bad Bunny	X 100pre	August 24, 2019	2
J Balvin and Bad Bunny	Oasis	September 7, 2019	2
Bad Bunny	X 100pre	September 21, 2019	12
Ozuna	Nibiru	December 14, 2019	1
Bad Bunny	X 100pre	December 21, 2019	2
