= List of Billboard Regional Mexican Albums number ones of 2013 =

Regional Mexican Albums is a record chart published in Billboard magazine that features Latin music sales information for regional styles of Mexican music. This data are compiled by Nielsen SoundScan from a sample that includes music stores, music departments at department stores and verifiable sales from concert venues in the United States.

== Number-one albums ==
Issue date	Album	Artist(s)	Reference(s)
January 5	La Misma Gran Señora	Jenni Rivera	
January 12	La Misma Gran Señora	Jenni Rivera	
January 19	La Misma Gran Señora	Jenni Rivera	
January 26	La Misma Gran Señora	Jenni Rivera	
February 2	La Misma Gran Señora	Jenni Rivera	
February 9	La Misma Gran Señora	Jenni Rivera	
February 16	La Misma Gran Señora	Jenni Rivera	
February 23	La Misma Gran Señora	Jenni Rivera	
March 2	La Misma Gran Señora	Jenni Rivera	
March 9	La Misma Gran Señora	Jenni Rivera	
March 16	La Misma Gran Señora	Jenni Rivera	
March 23	La Misma Gran Señora	Jenni Rivera	
March 30	Tu Amigo Nada Mas	Julión Álvarez y Su Norteno Banda	
April 6	La Misma Gran Señora	Jenni Rivera	
April 13	Sold Out: En Vivo Desde el Nokia	Gerardo Ortíz	
April 20	En Peligro de Extincion	Intocable	
April 27	En Peligro de Extincion	Intocable	
May 4	Celebrando El 13	Joan Sebastian	
May 11	En Peligro de Extincion	Intocable	
May 18	En Peligro de Extincion	Intocable	
May 25	Libre Por Naturaleza	Duelo	
June 1	Hoy	Vicente Fernández	
June 8	Hoy	Vicente Fernández	
June 15	Hoy	Vicente Fernández	
June 22	La Misma Gran Señora	Jenni Rivera	
June 29	Hoy	Vicente Fernández	
July 6	La Misma Gran Señora	Jenni Rivera	
July 13	Vives En Mi	La Maquinaria Nortena	
July 20	Lo Mejor de Fidel Rueda	Fidel Rueda	
July 27	Lo Mejor de Fidel Rueda	Fidel Rueda	
August 3	Lo Mejor de Roberto Tapia	Roberto Tapia	
August 10	Lo Mejor de Roberto Tapia	Roberto Tapia	
August 17	Lo Mejor de Roberto Tapia	Roberto Tapia	
August 24	Gracias Por Creer	La Arrolladora Banda el Limon de Rene Camacho	
August 31	Gracias Por Creer	La Arrolladora Banda el Limon de Rene Camacho	
September 7	Los Psychos del Corrido Los Psicopatas	Los Inquietos del Norte	
September 14	Gracias Por Creer	La Arrolladora Banda el Limon de Rene Camacho	
September 21	Gracias Por Creer	La Arrolladora Banda el Limon de Rene Camacho	
September 28	Los Mejores Corridos De	Voz de Mando	
October 5	Con La Frente En Alto	Luis Coronel	
October 12	Con La Frente En Alto	Luis Coronel	
October 19	Con La Frente En Alto	Luis Coronel	
October 26	Lástima Que Sean Ajenas	Pepe Aguilar	
November 2	Romanticos del Momento	Tierra Cali	
November 9	Radio Exitos El Disco del Ano: 2013	Various Artists	
November 16	Radio Exitos El Disco del Ano: 2013	Various Artists	
November 23	Con La Misma Sangre	Kevin Ortiz	
November 30	Radio Exitos El Disco del Ano: 2013	Various Artists	
December 7	Radio Exitos El Disco del Ano: 2013	Various Artists	
December 14	Archivos de Mi Vida	Gerardo Ortíz	
December 21	1969 – Siempre, En Vivo Desde Monterrey, Parte 1	Jenni Rivera	
December 28	1969 – Siempre, En Vivo Desde Monterrey, Parte 1	Jenni Rivera	
