= Billboard Music Award for Top Latin Album =

Annual American music award

- Awarded for: Top Latin Album of the Year
- Country: United States
- Presented by: ABC
- First award: 2005
- Currently held by: Nadie Sabe Lo Que Va a Pasar Mañana by Bad Bunny (2024)

Highlights
- Most awards: Bad Bunny (4)
- Most nominations: Bad Bunny (7)

The Billboard Music Award for Top Latin Album recognizes the most successful Latin albums on the Billboard Charts over the past year. Jenni Rivera became the first female artist to win the award at the 2013 Billboard Music Awards and won it posthumously. Prince Royce is the most nominated performer without a win, with four unsuccessful nominations.

== Winners and nominees ==
| Year | Winner | Nominees | Ref. |
|---|---|---|---|
| 2024 | Nadie Sabe Lo Que Va a Pasar Mañana – Bad Bunny | Pa Las Baby's y Belikeada – Fuerza Regida; El Comienzo – Grupo Frontera; $ad Boyz 4 Life II – Junior H; Mañana Será Bonito (Bichota Season) – Karol G | |
| 2023 | Un Verano Sin Ti – Bad Bunny | Desvelado – Eslabon Armado; Dañado – Iván Cornejo; Mañana Será Bonito – Karol G; Génesis – Peso Pluma | |
| 2022 | KG0516 – Karol G | Corta Venas – Eslabon Armado; Jose – J Balvin; Sin Miedo (del Amor y Otros Demonios) – Kali Uchis; Vice Versa – Rauw Alejandro | |
| 2021 | YHLQMDLG – Bad Bunny | Emmanuel – Anuel AA; El Último Tour Del Mundo – Bad Bunny; Las que no iban a salir – Bad Bunny; Colores – J Balvin | |
| 2020 | Oasis – J Balvin & Bad Bunny | Gangalee – Farruko; 11:11 – Maluma; Utopía – Romeo Santos; Sueños – Sech | |
| 2019 | Aura – Ozuna | Real Hasta la Muerte – Anuel AA; X 100pre – Bad Bunny; Vibras – J Balvin; F.A.M.E. – Maluma | |
| 2018 | Odisea – Ozuna | El Dorado – Shakira; Fénix – Nicky Jam; Golden – Romeo Santos; Me Deje Llevar – Christian Nodal | |
| 2017 | Los Dúo, Vol. 2 – Juan Gabriel | Energia – J Balvin; Primera Cita – CNCO; Vestido de Etiqueta por Eduardo Magallanes – Juan Gabriel; Recuerden Mi Estilo – Los Plebes del Rancho de Ariel Camacho | |
| 2016 | Los Dúo – Juan Gabriel | Juan Gabriel – Mis Número 1...40 Aniversario; Maná – Cama Incendiada; Gerardo Ortiz – Hoy Más Fuerte; Romeo Santos – Formula, Vol. 2 | |
| 2015 | Sex and Love – Enrique Iglesias | Los Dúo – Juan Gabriel; Formula, Vol. 2 – Romeo Santos; Corazón – Santana; 3.0 – Marc Anthony | |
| 2014 | 3.0 – Marc Antony | Confidencias – Alejandro Fernández; 1969 – Siempre, En Vivo Desde Monterrey, Parte 1 – Jenni Rivera; Soy el Mismo – Prince Royce; Formula, Vol. 2 – Romeo Santos | |
| 2013 | La Misma Gran Señora – Jenni Rivera | Joyas Prestadas: Banda – Jenni Rivera; Joyas Prestadas: Pop – Jenni Rivera; Formula, Vol. 1 – Romeo Santos; Phase II – Prince Royce | |
| 2012 | Formula, Vol. 1 – Romeo Santos | Dejarte de Amar – Camila; Viva el Príncipe – Cristian Castro; Drama Y Luz – Maná; Prince Royce – Prince Royce | |
| 2011 | Euphoria – Enrique Iglesias | Iconos – Marc Anthony; Dejarte de Amar – Camila; Prince Royce – Prince Royce; Sale el Sol – Shakira | |
| 2005 | Barrio fino – Daddy Yankee | | |
