= 2014 Latin Billboard Music Awards =

Annual American music awards ceremony

- Awarded for: the most popular albums, songs, and performers in Latin music in 2013, according to Billboard magazine
- Sponsored by: State Farm Insurance
- Date: April 24, 2014
- Location: BankUnited Center, University of Miami, Coral Gables, Florida
- Country: United States
- Presented by: Billboard
- Hosted by: Raúl González, Roselyn Sánchez, and Laura Flores
- Most awards: Marc Anthony (10)
- Most nominations: Jenni Rivera (11)

Television/radio coverage
- Network: Telemundo mun2

The 2014 Billboard Latin Music Awards, honors the most popular albums, songs, and performers in Latin music in 2013, as determined by the actual sales, radio airplay, streaming and social data that supplements Billboard's weekly charts. The ceremony was broadcast live on Telemundo and mun2 on April 24, 2014, from the BankUnited Center at the University of Miami in Coral Gables, Florida. The hosts were Raúl González, Roselyn Sánchez, and Laura Flores.

Marc Anthony won 10 awards including Artist of the Year, Top Latin Albums Artist of the Year – Male, and Tropical Albums Artist of the Year – Solo. Prince Royce was also a multiple winner in categories such as Hot Latin Songs Artist of the Year – Male, Latin Pop Songs Artist of the Year – Solo, Tropical Songs Artist of the Year and Streaming Song of the Year for his "Darte un Beso". Special awards were also handed out. Franco De Vita was given the Billboard Hall of Fame Award, Andrea Bocelli received the Lifetime Achievement Award and Carlos Vives was honored with the Billboard "Spirit of Hope Award".

== Winners and nominees ==
Winners are listed first and in boldface:

=== Artists ===
==== Artist of the Year ====
- **Marc Anthony**
  - Prince Royce
  - Jenni Rivera
  - Romeo Santos

==== New Artist of the Year ====
- **Luis Coronel**
  - Codigo FN
  - Leslie Grace
  - Roberto Junior y Su Bandeño

==== Tour of the Year ====
- **Luis Miguel**
  - Marc Anthony
  - Emmanuel & Mijares
  - Alejandro Fernández

==== Social Artist of the Year ====
- **Shakira**
  - Enrique Iglesias
  - Pitbull
  - Prince Royce

==== Crossover Artist of the Year ====
- **Bruno Mars**
  - Christina Aguilera
  - Rihanna
  - Robin Thicke

=== Songs ===
==== Hot Latin Song of the Year ====
- **Marc Anthony** – **Vivir Mi Vida**
  - Enrique Iglesias feat. Romeo Santos – Loco
  - Prince Royce – Darte un Beso
  - Romeo Santos – Propuesta Indecente

==== Hot Latin Song of the Year, Vocal Event ====
- **Enrique Iglesias** feat. **Romeo Santos** – **Loco**
  - Alejandro Fernández & Christina Aguilera – Hoy Tengo Ganas de Ti
  - Thalía feat. Prince Royce – Te Perdiste Mi Amor
  - Carlos Vives feat. Michel Teló – Como Le Gusta a Tu Cuerpo

==== Hot Latin Songs Artist of the Year, Male ====
- **Prince Royce**
  - Marc Anthony
  - Daddy Yankee
  - Romeo Santos

==== Hot Latin Songs Artist of the Year, Female ====
- **Thalía**
  - Christina Aguilera
  - Leslie Grace
  - Jenni Rivera

==== Hot Latin Songs Artist of the Year, Duo or Group ====
- **La Arrolladora Banda El Limón De Rene Camacho**
  - Banda el Recodo de Cruz Lizarraga
  - Banda Sinaloense MS de Sergio Lizarraga
  - Voz de Mando

==== Hot Latin Songs Label of the Year ====
- **Universal Music Latin Entertainment**
  - Siente
  - Sony Music Latin
  - Top Stop Music

==== Hot Latin Songs Imprint of the Year ====
- **Sony Music Latin**
  - Disa Records
  - Fonovisa Records
  - Universal Music Latino

==== Airplay Song of the Year ====
- **Marc Anthony** – **Vivir Mi Vida**
  - Enrique Iglesias feat. Romeo Santos – Loco
  - La Arrolladora Banda El Limón de Rene Camacho – El Ruido de Tus Zapatos
  - Prince Royce – Darte un Beso

==== Airplay Label of the Year ====
- **Universal Music Latin Entertainment**
  - Sony Music Latin
  - Top Stop Music
  - Venemusic

==== Airplay Imprint of the Year ====
- **Sony Music Latin**
  - Disa Records
  - Fonovisa Records
  - Universal Music Latino

==== Digital Song of the Year ====
- **Marc Anthony** – **Vivir Mi Vida**
  - Daddy Yankee – Limbo
  - Prince Royce – Darte un Beso
  - Romeo Santos – Propuesta Indecente

==== Streaming Song of the Year ====
- **Prince Royce** – **Darte un Beso**
  - Marc Anthony – Vivir Mi Vida
  - Enrique Iglesias feat. Romeo Santos – Loco
  - Romeo Santos – Propuesta Indecente

=== Albums ===
==== Top Latin Album of the Year ====
- **Marc Anthony** – **3.0**
  - Alejandro Fernández – Confidencias
  - Jenni Rivera – La Misma Gran Señora
  - Jenni Rivera – Joyas Prestadas: Pop

==== Top Latin Albums Artist of the Year, Male ====
- **Marc Anthony**
  - Alejandro Fernández
  - Gerardo Ortiz
  - Prince Royce

==== Top Latin Albums Artist of the Year, Female ====
- **Jenni Rivera**
  - Natalie Cole
  - Rocío Dúrcal
  - Ednita Nazario

==== Top Latin Albums Artist of the Year, Duo or Group ====
- **La Arrolladora Banda El Limón de Rene Camacho**
  - Calibre 50
  - Il Volo
  - Voz de Mando

==== Top Latin Albums Label of the Year ====
- **Universal Music Latin Entertainment**
  - Sony Music Latin
  - Top Stop Music
  - Warner Music Latina

==== Top Latin Albums Imprint of the Year ====
- **Fonovisa Records**
  - Disa Records
  - Sony Music Latin
  - Universal Music Latino

=== Latin Pop ===
==== Latin Pop Song of the Year ====
- **Marc Anthony** – **Vivir Mi Vida**
  - Daddy Yankee – Limbo
  - Enrique Iglesias feat. Romeo Santos – Loco
  - Prince Royce – Darte un Beso

==== Latin Pop Songs Artist of the Year, Solo ====
- **Prince Royce**
  - Marc Anthony
  - Daddy Yankee
  - Romeo Santos

==== Latin Pop Songs Artist of the Year, Duo or Group ====
- **Chino & Nacho**
  - Alexis & Fido
  - Jesse & Joy
  - Wisin & Yandel

==== Latin Pop Airplay Label of the Year ====
- **Sony Music Latin**
  - Top Stop Music
  - Universal Music Latin Entertainment
  - Warner Music Latina

==== Latin Pop Airplay Imprint of the Year ====
- **Sony Music Latin**
  - Machete Music
  - Universal Music Latino
  - Warner Music Latina

==== Latin Pop Album of the Year ====
- **Alejandro Fernández** – Confidencias
  - Andrea Bocelli – Pasión
  - Jenni Rivera – Joyas Prestadas: Pop
  - Carlos Vives – Corazón Profundo

==== Latin Pop Albums Artist of the Year, Solo ====
- **Alejandro Fernández**
  - Ricardo Arjona
  - Andrea Bocelli
  - Jenni Rivera

==== Latin Pop Albums Artist of the Year, Duo or Group ====
- **Il Volo**
  - Jesse & Joy
  - Los Bukis
  - Maná

==== Latin Pop Albums Label of the Year ====
- **Universal Music Latin Entertainment**
  - Sony Music Latin
  - VG Records
  - Warner Music Latina

==== Latin Pop Albums Imprint of the Year ====
- **Universal Music Latino**
  - Fonovisa Records
  - Sony Music Latin
  - Warner Music Latina

=== Tropical ===
==== Tropical Song of the Year ====
- **Marc Anthony** – **Vivir Mi Vida**
  - Enrique Iglesias feat. Romeo Santos – Loco
  - Prince Royce – Darte un Beso
  - Romeo Santos – Propuesta Indecente

==== Tropical Songs Artist of the Year, Solo ====
- **Prince Royce**
  - Marc Anthony
  - Romeo Santos
  - Tito El Bambino

==== Tropical Songs Artist of the Year, Duo or Group ====
- **Chino & Nacho**
  - Alexis & Fido
  - Grupo Manía
  - N'Klabe

==== Tropical Songs Airplay Label of the Year ====
- **Sony Music Latin**
  - Siente
  - Top Stop Music
  - Universal Music Latin Entertainment

==== Tropical Songs Airplay Imprint of the Year ====
- **Sony Music Latin**
  - On Fire
  - Top Stop Music
  - Universal Music Latino

==== Tropical Album of the Year ====
- **Marc Anthony** – **3.0**
  - Prince Royce – #1's
  - Prince Royce – Soy el Mismo
  - Various Artists – Sergio George Presents: Salsa Giants

==== Tropical Albums Artist of the Year, Solo ====
- **Marc Anthony**
  - Juan Luis Guerra
  - Prince Royce
  - Romeo Santos

==== Tropical Albums Artist of the Year, Duo or Group ====
- **El Gran Combo de Puerto Rico**
  - El Seis del Solar
  - Grupo Manía
  - Grupo Niche

==== Tropical Albums Label of the Year ====
- **Sony Music Latin**
  - Atlantic Group
  - Top Stop Music
  - Universal Music Latin Entertainment

==== Tropical Albums Imprint of the Year ====
- **Sony Music Latin**
  - Capitol Latin
  - Top Stop Music
  - Universal Music Latino

=== Regional Mexican ===
==== Regional Mexican Song of the Year ====
- **La Arrolladora Banda El Limón De Rene Camacho** – **El Ruido De Tus Zapatos**
  - Banda Carnaval – Y Te Vas
  - Voz de Mando – Y Ahora Resulta
  - Gerardo Ortiz – Damaso

==== Regional Mexican Songs Artist of the Year, Solo ====
- **Gerardo Ortiz**
  - Luis Coronel
  - Roberto Tapia
  - Noel Torres

==== Regional Mexican Songs Artist of the Year, Duo or Group ====
- **La Arrolladora Banda El Limón De Rene Camacho**
  - Banda Carnaval
  - Banda el Recodo De Cruz Lizarraga
  - Voz De Mando

==== Regional Mexican Airplay Label of the Year ====
- **Universal Music Latin Entertainment**
  - Discos Sabinas
  - Sony Music Latin
  - Gerencia360

==== Regional Mexican Airplay Imprint of the Year ====
- **Disa Records**
  - DEL
  - Discos Sabinas
  - Fonovisa Records

==== Regional Mexican Album of the Year ====
- **Jenni Rivera La Misma Gran Señora**
  - Jenni Rivera 1969 - Siempre, En Vivo Desde Monterrey, Parte 1
  - Jenni Rivera Joyas Prestadas: Banda
  - Various Artists Las Bandas Romanticas de America 2013

==== Regional Mexican Albums Artist of the Year, Solo ====
- **Jenni Rivera**
  - Gerardo Ortiz
  - Joan Sebastian
  - Roberto Tapia

==== Regional Mexican Albums Artist of the Year, Duo or Group ====
- **La Arrolladora Banda El Limón De Rene Camacho**
  - Calibre 50
  - Intocable
  - Voz de Mando

==== Regional Mexican Albums Label of the Year ====
- **Universal Music Latin Entertainment**
  - Discos America
  - Freddie
  - Sony Music Latin

==== Regional Mexican Albums Imprint of the Year ====
- **Fonovisa Records**
  - Bad Sin
  - DEL
  - Disa Records

=== Latin Rhythm ===
==== Latin Rhythm Song of the Year ====
- **Daddy Yankee** – **Limbo**
  - Alexis & Fido – Rompe La Cintura
  - J Alvarez – La Pregunta
  - Don Omar – Zumba

==== Latin Rhythm Songs Artist of the Year, Solo ====
- **Don Omar**
  - J Alvarez
  - Daddy Yankee
  - Yandel

==== Latin Rhythm Songs Artist of the Year, Duo or Group ====
- **Alexis & Fido**
  - Ilegales
  - Plan B
  - Wisin & Yandel

==== Latin Rhythm Airplay Label of the Year ====
- **Universal Music Latin Entertainment**
  - Pina Records
  - Sony Music Latin
  - Wild Dogz

==== Latin Rhythm Airplay Imprint of the Year ====
- **Machete Music**
  - Capitol Latin
  - Pina Records
  - Sony Music Latin

==== Latin Rhythm Album of the Year ====
- **Wisin & Yandel** – **Lideres**
  - Don Omar – Don Omar Presents MT02: New Generation
  - Yandel – De Lider a Leyenda
  - Various Artists – Pina Records Presenta: La Formula: The Company

==== Latin Rhythm Albums Artist of the Year, Solo ====
- **Daddy Yankee**
  - Don Omar
  - Arcangel
  - Yandel

==== Latin Rhythm Albums Artist of the Year, Duo or Group ====
- **Wisin & Yandel**
  - Dyland & Lenny
  - Jowell & Randy
  - Kinto Sol

==== Latin Rhythm Albums Label of the Year ====
- **Universal Music Latin Entertainment**
  - Nelflow
  - Sony Music Latin
  - Urban Latin

==== Latin Rhythm Albums Imprint of the Year ====
- **Machete Music**
  - Capitol Latin
  - Pina Records
  - Sony Music Latin

=== Writers, Producers, Publishers ===
==== Songwriter of the Year ====
- **Anthony "Romeo" Santos**
  - Luciano Luna Diaz
  - Isidro Chávez Espinoza
  - Gerardo Ortiz

==== Publisher of the Year ====
- **EMI Blackwood Music Inc., BMI**
  - Arpa Musical, LLC, BMI
  - LGA Music Publishing, BMI
  - Mayimba Music, Inc., ASCAP

==== Publishing Corporation of the Year ====
- **Sony/ATV Music Publishing**
  - Arpa Music
  - Universal Music Group
  - Warner/Chappell Music

==== Producer of the Year ====
- **Anthony "Romeo" Santos**
  - Fernando Camacho Tirado
  - Sergio George
  - Jesus Tirado Castañeda

==== Billboard Lifetime achievement award ====
- Andrea Bocelli

==== Billboard Latin Music Hall of Fame ====
- Franco De Vita

== Sources ==
- Billboard Staff. "Billboard Latin Music Awards 2014: Complete Winners List". Billboard.com.
- Billboard Staff. "Billboard Latin Music Awards: Complete List of 2014 Finalists". Billboard.com.
