= List of Billboard Regional Mexican Albums number ones of 2015 =

Regional Mexican Albums is a record chart published in Billboard magazine that features Latin music sales information for regional styles of Mexican music. This data are compiled by Nielsen SoundScan from a sample that includes music stores, music departments at department stores and verifiable sales from concert venues in the United States.

== Number-one albums ==
Issue date	Album	Artist(s)	Reference(s)
January 3	Zodiacal	Siggno	
January 10	1 Vida – 3 Historias: Metamorfosis – Despedida de Culiacán – Jenni Vive 2013	Jenni Rivera	
January 17	1 Vida – 3 Historias: Metamorfosis – Despedida de Culiacán – Jenni Vive 2013	Jenni Rivera	
January 24	1 Vida – 3 Historias: Metamorfosis – Despedida de Culiacán – Jenni Vive 2013	Jenni Rivera	
January 31	1 Vida – 3 Historias: Metamorfosis – Despedida de Culiacán – Jenni Vive 2013	Jenni Rivera	
February 7	Las Bandas Romanticas de America	Various Artists	
February 14	XX: 20 Aniversario	Intocable	
February 21	Ojos En Blanco	La Arrolladora Banda el Limon de Rene Camacho	
February 28	Ojos En Blanco	La Arrolladora Banda el Limon de Rene Camacho	
March 7	Las Bandas Romanticas de America	Various Artists	
March 14	El Karma	Ariel Camacho y Los Plebes del Rancho	
March 21	Sentimientos	Solido	
March 28	Las Bandas Romanticas de America	Various Artists	
April 4	Lo Mejor de	Calibre 50	
April 11	El Aferrado	Julión Álvarez y Su Norteño Banda	
April 18	El Aferrado	Julión Álvarez y Su Norteño Banda	
April 25	El Aferrado	Julión Álvarez y Su Norteño Banda	
May 2	Abrazame	Pesado	
May 9	El Aferrado	Julión Álvarez y Su Norteño Banda	
May 16	El Aferrado	Julión Álvarez y Su Norteño Banda	
May 23	El Aferrado	Julión Álvarez y Su Norteño Banda	
May 30	El Aferrado	Julión Álvarez y Su Norteño Banda	
June 6	Hoy Mas Fuerte	Gerardo Ortíz	
June 13	Hoy Mas Fuerte	Gerardo Ortíz	
June 20	Ahora	Chiquis Rivera	
June 27	Hoy Mas Fuerte	Gerardo Ortíz	
July 4	Hoy Mas Fuerte	Gerardo Ortíz	
July 11	Hoy Mas Fuerte	Gerardo Ortíz	
July 18	Mi Vicio Más Grande	Banda El Recodo de Cruz Lizarraga	
July 25	Mi Vicio Más Grande	Banda El Recodo de Cruz Lizarraga	
August 1	Personalidad	Joan Sebastian	
August 8	Personalidad	Joan Sebastian	
August 15	Personalidad	Joan Sebastian	
August 22	Personalidad	Joan Sebastian	
August 29	Personalidad	Joan Sebastian	
September 5	Personalidad	Joan Sebastian	
September 12	Personalidad	Joan Sebastian	
September 19	En Vivo: Guadalajara - Monterrey	Banda Sinaloense MS de Sergio Lizarraga	
September 26	En Vivo: Guadalajara - Monterrey	Banda Sinaloense MS de Sergio Lizarraga	
October 3	En Vivo: Guadalajara - Monterrey	Banda Sinaloense MS de Sergio Lizarraga	
October 10	En Vivo: Guadalajara - Monterrey	Banda Sinaloense MS de Sergio Lizarraga	
October 17	Ya Dime Adiós	La Maquinaria Norteña	
October 24	Ya Dime Adiós	La Maquinaria Norteña	
October 31	Muriendo de Amor	Vicente Fernández	
November 7	En Vivo: Guadalajara - Monterrey	Banda Sinaloense MS de Sergio Lizarraga	
November 14	Radio Exitos: El Disco del Ano 2015	Various Artists	
November 21	Ya Dime Adiós	La Maquinaria Norteña	
November 28	Hablemos	Ariel Camacho y Los Plebes del Rancho	
December 5	Diferente	Roberto Tapia	
December 12	Historias de La Calle	Calibre 50	
December 19	Ya Dime Adiós	La Maquinaria Norteña	
December 26	Desde El Azteca	Los Tigres del Norte	
