= List of Billboard Regional Mexican Albums number ones of 2016 =

Regional Mexican Albums is a record chart published in Billboard magazine that features Latin music sales information for regional styles of Mexican music. This data are compiled by Nielsen SoundScan from a sample that includes music stores, music departments at department stores and verifiable sales from concert venues in the United States.

== Number-one albums ==
| Issue date | Album | Artist(s) | Reference(s) |
|---|---|---|---|
| January 2 | Desde El Azteca | Los Tigres del Norte | |
| January 9 | Desde El Azteca | Los Tigres del Norte | |
| January 16 | En Vivo: Guadalajara - Monterrey | Banda Sinaloense MS de Sergio Lizarraga | |
| January 23 | Hablemos | Ariel Camacho y Los Plebes del Rancho | |
| January 30 | En Vivo: Guadalajara - Monterrey | Banda Sinaloense MS de Sergio Lizarraga | |
| February 6 | 20 Bandazos de Oro: Puros Exitos | Various Artists | |
| February 13 | Las Bandas Romanticas de America 2016 | Various Artists | |
| February 20 | Me Esta Gustando | Banda Los Recoditos | |
| February 27 | Que Bendicion | Banda Sinaloense MS de Sergio Lizarraga | |
| March 5 | Que Bendicion | Banda Sinaloense MS de Sergio Lizarraga | |
| March 12 | Que Bendicion | Banda Sinaloense MS de Sergio Lizarraga | |
| March 19 | Que Bendicion | Banda Sinaloense MS de Sergio Lizarraga | |
| March 26 | Recuerden Mi Estilo | Los Plebes del Rancho de Ariel Camacho | |
| April 2 | Recuerden Mi Estilo | Los Plebes del Rancho de Ariel Camacho | |
| April 9 | Recuerden Mi Estilo | Los Plebes del Rancho de Ariel Camacho | |
| April 16 | Recuerden Mi Estilo | Los Plebes del Rancho de Ariel Camacho | |
| April 23 | Recuerden Mi Estilo | Los Plebes del Rancho de Ariel Camacho | |
| April 30 | Mis Idolos, Hoy Mis Amigos!!! | Julión Álvarez y Su Norteno Banda | |
| May 7 | A Todo Volumen | La Septima Banda | |
| May 14 | Mis Idolos, Hoy Mis Amigos!!! | Julión Álvarez y Su Norteno Banda | |
| May 21 | Recuerden Mi Estilo | Los Plebes del Rancho de Ariel Camacho | |
| May 28 | Recuerden Mi Estilo | Los Plebes del Rancho de Ariel Camacho | |
| June 4 | Recuerden Mi Estilo | Los Plebes del Rancho de Ariel Camacho | |
| June 11 | Recuerden Mi Estilo | Los Plebes del Rancho de Ariel Camacho | |
| June 18 | Recuerden Mi Estilo | Los Plebes del Rancho de Ariel Camacho | |- |
| June 25 | Libre Otra Vez | La Arrolladora Banda el Limón de Rene Camacho | |
| July 2 | Libre Otra Vez | La Arrolladora Banda el Limón de Rene Camacho | |
| July 9 | Highway | Intocable | |
| July 16 | Highway | Intocable | |
| July 23 | Highway | Intocable | |
| July 30 | Raices | Banda El Recodo de Cruz Lizarraga | |
| August 6 | Yo Te Esperare | Siggno | |
| August 13 | Yo Te Esperare | Siggno | |
| August 20 | Generacion Maquinaria Est. 2006. | La Maquinaria Nortena | |
| August 27 | Generacion Maquinaria Est. 2006. | La Maquinaria Nortena | |
| September 3 | Generacion Maquinaria Est. 2006. | La Maquinaria Nortena | |
| September 10 | Generacion Maquinaria Est. 2006. | La Maquinaria Nortena | |
| September 17 | Juan Gabriel: Duos & Interpretaciones | Juan Gabriel & Various | |
| September 24 | Juan Gabriel: Duos & Interpretaciones | Juan Gabriel & Various | |
| October 1 | No Pongan Esas Canciones | Espinoza Paz | |
| October 8 | Desde El Rancho | Calibre 50 | |
| October 15 | Desde El Rancho | Calibre 50 | |
| October 22 | Desde El Rancho | Calibre 50 | |
| October 29 | Desde El Rancho | Calibre 50 | |
| November 5 | Desde El Rancho | Calibre 50 | |
| November 12 | Paloma Negra Desde Monterrey | Jenni Rivera | |
| November 19 | No Hay Quinto Malo | La Energia Nortena | |
| November 26 | No Hay Quinto Malo | La Energia Nortena | |
| December 3 | Paloma Negra Desde Monterrey | Jenni Rivera | |
| December 10 | Paloma Negra Desde Monterrey | Jenni Rivera | |
| December 17 | Paloma Negra Desde Monterrey | Jenni Rivera | |
| December 24 | Paloma Negra Desde Monterrey | Jenni Rivera | |
| December 31 | Paloma Negra Desde Monterrey | Jenni Rivera | |
