= List of number-one Billboard Regional Mexican Songs of 2012 =

The Billboard Regional Mexican Songs chart ranks the best-performing Regional Mexican singles in the United States. Published weekly by Billboard magazine, it ranks the "most popular regional Mexican songs, ranked by radio airplay audience impressions as measured by Nielsen Music."

== Chart history ==
Key
†	Indicates best-performing song of 2012

Issue date	Song	Artist(s)	Ref.
January 7	"Nada iguales"	La Addictiva Banda San Jose de Mesillas	
January 14	"Nada iguales"	La Addictiva Banda San Jose de Mesillas	
January 21	"Nada iguales"	La Addictiva Banda San Jose de Mesillas	
January 28	"Te quiero a morir"	Banda el Recodo de Cruz Lizárraga	
February 4	"Te quiero a morir"	Banda el Recodo de Cruz Lizárraga	
February 11	"Llamada de mi ex" †	La Arroladora Banda el Limón de René Camacho	
February 18	"Llamada de mi ex" †	La Arroladora Banda el Limón de René Camacho	
February 25	"Llamada de mi ex" †	La Arroladora Banda el Limón de René Camacho	
March 3	"Llamada de mi ex" †	La Arroladora Banda el Limón de René Camacho	
March 10	"Llamada de mi ex" †	La Arroladora Banda el Limón de René Camacho	
March 17	"Llamada de mi ex" †	La Arroladora Banda el Limón de René Camacho	
March 24	"Llamada de mi ex" †	La Arroladora Banda el Limón de René Camacho	
March 31	"Llamada de mi ex" †	La Arroladora Banda el Limón de René Camacho	
April 7	"Llamada de mi ex" †	La Arroladora Banda el Limón de René Camacho	
April 14	"Llamada de mi ex" †	La Arroladora Banda el Limón de René Camacho	
April 21	"Llamada de mi ex" †	La Arroladora Banda el Limón de René Camacho	
April 28	"Llamada de mi ex" †	La Arroladora Banda el Limón de René Camacho	
May 5	"Llamada de mi ex" †	La Arroladora Banda el Limón de René Camacho	
May 12	"Llamada de mi ex" †	La Arroladora Banda el Limón de René Camacho	
May 19	"Llamada de mi ex" †	La Arroladora Banda el Limón de René Camacho	
May 26	"Un hombre normal"	Espinoza Paz	
June 2	"Llamada de mi ex" †	La Arroladora Banda el Limón de René Camacho	
June 9	"Llamada de mi ex" †	La Arroladora Banda el Limón de René Camacho	
June 16	"Llamada de mi ex" †	La Arroladora Banda el Limón de René Camacho	
June 23	"Un hombre normal"	Espinoza Paz	
June 30	"Un hombre normal"	Espinoza Paz	
July 7	"Llamada de mi ex" †	La Arroladora Banda el Limón de René Camacho	
July 14	"Llamada de mi ex" †	La Arroladora Banda el Limón de René Camacho	
July 21	"Amor Confuso"	Gerardo Ortíz	
July 28	"Amor Confuso"	Gerardo Ortíz	
August 4	"Amor Confuso"	Gerardo Ortíz	
August 11	"Sin respiración"	Banda el Recodo de Cruz Lizárraga	
August 18	"Sin respiración"	Banda el Recodo de Cruz Lizárraga	
August 25	"Sin respiración"	Banda el Recodo de Cruz Lizárraga	
September 1	"Sin respiración"	Banda el Recodo de Cruz Lizárraga	
September 8	"Mirando al cielo"	Roberto Tapia	
September 15	"Mirando al cielo"	Roberto Tapia	
September 22	"Mirando al cielo"	Roberto Tapia	
September 29	"Sin respiración"	Banda el Recodo de Cruz Lizárraga	
October 6	"Sin respiración"	Banda el Recodo de Cruz Lizárraga	
October 13	"Sin respiración"	Banda el Recodo de Cruz Lizárraga	
October 20	"Sin respiración"	Banda el Recodo de Cruz Lizárraga	
October 27	"Mirando al cielo"	Roberto Tapia	
November 3	"Solo vine a despedirme"	Gerardo Ortiz	
November 10	"Solo vine a despedirme"	Gerardo Ortiz	
November 17	"Solo vine a despedirme"	Gerardo Ortiz	
November 24	"Solo vine a despedirme"	Gerardo Ortiz	
December 1	"Solo vine a despedirme"	Gerardo Ortiz	
December 8	"Solo vine a despedirme"	Gerardo Ortiz	
December 15	"Solo vine a despedirme"	Gerardo Ortiz	
December 22	"Solo vine a despedirme"	Gerardo Ortiz	
December 29	"Solo vine a despedirme"	Gerardo Ortiz	
