= La Más Completa Colección =

La Más Completa Colección may refer to:

- La Más Completa Colección (Jenni Rivera album)
- La Más Completa Colección (Marco Antonio Solís album)
- La Más Completa Colección, an album by Alberto Vázquez
- La Más Completa Colección, an album by Amanda Miguel
- La Más Completa Colección, an album by La Arrolladora Banda El Limón
- La Más Completa Colección, an album by Los Bukis
- La Más Completa Colección, an album by Chespirito
- La Más Completa Colección, an album by Cristian Castro
- La Más Completa Colección, an album by Control Machete
- La Más Completa Colección, an album by Diego Verdaguer
- La Más Completa Colección, an album by Enanitos Verdes
- La Más Completa Colección, an album by Grupo Límite
- La Más Completa Colección, an album by Julión Álvarez
- La Más Completa Colección, an album by Kabah
- La Más Completa Colección, an album by Lucero
- La Más Completa Colección, an album by Mariachi Vargas de Tecalitlán
- La Más Completa Colección, an album by Mercedes Sosa
- La Más Completa Colección, an album by Mijares
- La Más Completa Colección, an album by Miguel Ríos
- La Más Completa Colección, an album by Moderatto
- La Más Completa Colección, an album by Mœnia
- La Más Completa Colección, an album by Nacha Pop
- La Más Completa Colección, an album by Nana Mouskouri
- La Más Completa Colección, an album by Onda Vaselina
- La Más Completa Colección, an album by Óscar Chávez
- La Más Completa Colección, an album by Pablo Milanés
- La Más Completa Colección, an album by Paty Cantú
- La Más Completa Colección, an album by Pedro Fernández
- La Más Completa Colección, an album by Ricardo Montaner
- La Más Completa Colección, an album by Rigo Tovar
- La Más Completa Colección, an album by Sergio Dalma
- La Más Completa Colección, an album by Tania Libertad
- La Más Completa Colección, an album by Tatiana
- La Más Completa Colección, Vol. 1 and Vol. 2, albums by Alejandra Guzmán
- La Más Completa Colección, Vol. 1 and Vol. 2, albums by Banda El Recodo
- La Más Completa Colección, Vol. 1 and Vol. 2, albums by Flans
- La Más Completa Colección, Vol. 1 and Vol. 2, albums by Mijares
- La Más Completa Colección, Vol. 1 and Vol. 2, albums by Thalía
- La Más Completa Colección, Vol. 1 and Vol. 2, albums by Timbiriche
- La Más Completa Colección, Vol. 1 and Vol. 2, albums by Víctor Yturbe
- La Más Completa Colección, Vol. 1 and Vol. 2, albums by Los Yonic's
