= Cambio de Piel (song) =

Single by Marc Anthony

from the album 3.0
- Released: October 10, 2013
- Recorded: 2013
- Genre: Salsa
- Length: 4:36
- Label: Sony Music Latin
- Songwriters: Yoel Henríquez; Julio Reyes Copello
- Producer: Sergio George

Marc Anthony singles chronology
"Vivir Mi Vida" (2013)	"Cambio de Piel" (2013)	"Se Fue" (2014)

Cambio de Piel ("Change of Skin") is a song written by Julio Reyes, produced by Sergio George, and performed by American recording artist Marc Anthony. It was released as the second single from his thirteenth studio 3.0 (2013). A music video for the song is currently filmed at Cancún, Mexico. At the Latin Grammy Awards of 2014, the song received two nominations including Song of the Year and Record of the Year.

== Charts ==
=== Weekly charts ===
Chart (2013–2014)	Peak position
Dominican Republic (Monitor Latino)	12
US Hot Latin Songs (Billboard)	7
US Latin Airplay (Billboard)	2
US Tropical Airplay (Billboard)	1

=== Year-end charts ===
Chart (2014)	Position
US Hot Latin Songs (Billboard)	33
