= Paloma Negra Desde Monterrey =

- Standard Edition Cover

Live album by Jenni Rivera
- Released: October 28, 2016
- Recorded: December 8, 2012
- Venue: Arena Monterrey
- Genre: Regional Mexican
- Length: 50:18 (Standard Edition); 1:14:37 (Deluxe Edition)
- Language: Spanish
- Labels: Fonovisa; Universal Music Latin Entertainment
- Producer: Juan Rivera

Jenni Rivera chronology
| 1 Vida – 3 Historias: Metamorfosis – Despedida de Culiacán – Jenni Vive 2013 (2014) | Paloma Negra Desde Monterrey (2016) | Angel Baby (2017) |

Singles from Paloma Negra Desde Monterrey
- 1. "Paloma Negra (Live)" Released: September 25, 2015; 2. "Mírame (Live)" Released: October 7, 2016; 3. "La Mentada Contestada (Live)" Released: October 13, 2016; 4. "Sufriendo A Solas (Live)" Released: October 20, 2016

Paloma Negra Desde Monterrey is a posthumous live album by regional Mexican singer Jenni Rivera, released on October 28, 2016 by Universal Music Latin Entertainment. It is the third and final part of a live recording trilogy of her final concert in Monterrey, Nuevo León, just three hours before her death. The album was produced by Rivera's brother, singer Juan Rivera.

Paloma Negra Desde Monterrey reached number-one on the Billboard Top Latin Albums chart in the United States. Four singles were released from the album: "Paloma Negra (Live)", "Mírame (Live)", "La Mentada Contestada (Live)", and "Sufriendo A Solas (Live)".

== Background ==
American singer Jenni Rivera performed at the Monterrey Arena on December 8, 2012. Rivera performed for a little over three hours, accompanied by her Banda and norteño group, as well as a mariachi group. At 2:00 a.m. on December 9, when the show ended, she held a press conference at the same venue. She left the Arena along with her staff and departed from Monterrey International Airport at 3:00 a.m. CST. At approximately 3:20 a.m. CST a US-registered private Learjet 25 N345MC carrying two pilots and five passengers, including Rivera, lost contact with air traffic control near Iturbide, Nuevo León, Mexico. The plane was en route to Toluca for an appearance by Rivera on the local version of The Voice.

All on board were presumed dead by Mexican authorities when the wreckage was found later that day. Jenni Rivera's father, Pedro, confirmed in a Telemundo interview that his daughter had died in the crash. Mexican aviation authorities declared in the media that her plane was shattered into fragments which spread as far as 300 meters. The impact of the crash was so severe that it is believed the plane went down in a nose dive at speeds of up to 700 mph (1,100 km/h).

The album's release comes nearly three years after her death. It is the last part of a trilogy released by her family.

== Commercial release ==
In the United States, according to the Billboard Top Latin Albums chart it debuted at number one, replacing Los Dúo, Vol. 2 by Mexican singer-songwriter Juan Gabriel. The album marked Rivera's 8th number-one album on the chart, making her the female with the most number-ones, surpassing fellow Mexican American singer Selena, at seven.

== Track listing ==
Paloma Negra Desde Monterrey
| No. | Title | Writer(s) | Length |
|---|---|---|---|
| 1. | "Platino y Oro (Live)" | Dolores Janney Rivera | 02:39 |
| 2. | "Culpable o Inocente (Live)" | Camilo Banes | 03:20 |
| 3. | "No Me Pregunten Por Él (Live)" | Carlos Peña | 03:08 |
| 4. | "Que Me Vas a Dar (Live) [Deluxe]" | Alfonso García F. & Ramon Ortega | 03:36 |
| 5. | "Detrás de Mi Ventana (Live) [Deluxe]" | Ricardo Arjona | 04:40 |
| 6. | "Mudanzas (Live)" | Sergio Sa, Vanusa, Ponco Perez & C. Reynoso | 03:15 |
| 7. | "Inolvidable (Live)" | Isidro Chavez Espinoza | 02:38 |
| 8. | "Dama Divina (Live)" | Dolores Janney Rivera | 02:26 |
| 9. | "A Cambio de Qué (Live) [Deluxe]" | Xavier Santos | 04:34 |
| 10. | "Gracias Por Hacerme Feliz (Live)" | Dolores Janney Rivera | 03:13 |
| 11. | "La Primera Pierda (Live)" | Dolores Janney Rivera | 01:45 |
| 12. | "¿Qué Alboroto? (Live)" | Dolores Janney Rivera | 00:59 |
| 13. | "Ovarios (Live)" | Dolores Janney Rivera | 04:16 |
| 14. | "La Misma Gran Señora (Live)" | Homero Aguilar Cabrera | 03:06 |
| 15. | "La Mentada Contestada" | Dolores Janney Rivera | 03:20 |
| 16. | "Otra! Otra! Otra! (Live)" | Dolores Janney Rivera | 01:23 |
| 17. | "Gracias a Dios Por Esta Noche (Live)" | Dolores Janney Rivera | 00:43 |
| 18. | "Paloma Negra Intro (Live)" | Dolores Janney Rivera | 00:51 |
| 19. | "Paloma Negra (Live)" | Tomás Méndez Sosa | 03:25 |
| 20. | "Sufriendo a Solas (Live)" | Jose Angel Espinoza | 03:21 |
| 21. | "Mírame (Live)" | Bruno Danza | 03:20 |
| 22. | "Y al Cielo Partio (Live)" | Dolores Janney Rivera | 03:32 |
| 23. | "La Gran Señora (Live) [Deluxe]" | Dolores Janney Rivera | 03:51 |
| 24. | "Como Tu Mujer (Live) [Deluxe]" | Marco Antonio Solís | 03:56 |
| 25. | "Cuando Muere una Dama (Banda) [Deluxe]" | Dolores Janney Rivera | 04:01 |
| Total length: | | | 50:19 (Standard Edition); 1:14:38 (Deluxe Edition) |

== Charts ==
=== Weekly charts ===
| Chart (2016) | Peak position |
|---|---|
| US Billboard 200 | 178 |
| US Top Latin Albums (Billboard) | 1 |
| US Regional Mexican Albums (Billboard) | 1 |

=== Year-end charts ===
| Chart (2016) | Position |
|---|---|
| US Top Latin Albums (Billboard) | 60 |
| Chart (2017) | Position |
| US Top Latin Albums (Billboard) | 68 |

== Release history ==
| Regions | Dates | Format(s) | Label(s) |
|---|---|---|---|
| United States, Mexico | October 28, 2016 | CD, digital download | Fonovisa |

== See also ==
- 2016 in Latin music
- List of number-one Billboard Latin Albums from the 2010s
