= Quiero ser tu dueño =

Studio album by Luis Coronel
- Released: September 30, 2014
- Recorded: 2014
- Genre: Regional Mexican
- Length: 44:53
- Label: DEL Records

Luis Coronel chronology
Con la frente en alto (2013)	Quiero ser tu dueño (2014)

Quiero ser tu dueño (English: I Want to be Your Owner), is the second studio album by singer-songwriter Luis Coronel, released on September 30, 2014, by DEL Records. Some of the songs were composed by Ernesto Chairez, José Davila, Luna Díaz, José Alfredo Iturbe Parra, and Coronel himself. Quiero ser tu dueño became Coronel's first album to debut at number 1 on the Billboard Top Latin Albums chart in the United States.

== Track listing ==
No.	Title	Writer(s)	Length
1.	"Tenerte"	Luna Díaz, Luciano Luna	3:28
2.	"Quiero ser tu dueño"	Luis Coronel	3:02
3.	"Mi vida"	José Alfredo López Grijalva	1:59
4.	"Dime que sí"	América Sierra	3:02
5.	"Nací para amarte"	Luciano Luna	3:05
6.	"Me muero por verte"	José Davila, Fausto Juárez	2:40
7.	"Hermano mío"	Ernesto Chairez	2:33
8.	"Tendrás que aguantarme"	Coronel	2:53
9.	"Me enamoras"	Joss Favela, Horacio Palencia	2:54
10.	"Alérgico a ti"	Eduardo Salazar	2:36
11.	"Sólo soy yo"	Manny Ledesma, Eduardo Salazar	2:38
12.	"Cuando la miro"	José Alfredo Iturbe Parra	2:29
13.	"Si tú quisieras"	Ismael Gallegos, Rafael Guevara	2:49
14.	"Quiero ser tu dueño (Version Banda)"	Coronel	3:06
15.	"Tendrás que aguantarte (Version Norteña)"	Coronel	2:47
16.	"Perdóname (Acoustic Version)"	Coronel	2:52

== Charts ==
=== Weekly charts ===
Chart (2014)	Peak position
US Billboard 200	33
US Top Latin Albums (Billboard)	1
US Regional Mexican Albums (Billboard)	1

=== Year-end charts ===
Chart (2014)	Position
US Top Latin Albums (Billboard)	22
Chart (2015)	Position
US Top Latin Albums (Billboard)	61

== Sales and certifications ==
Region	Certification	Certified units/sales
United States (RIAA)	Gold (Latin)	30,000^{^}
^{^} Shipments figures based on certification alone.

== Awards and nominations ==
Year	Award	Category	Nominated works	Result	Ref.
2015	Premios Juventud	Lo toco todo	Quiero ser tu dueño	Won	

== See also ==
- List of number-one Billboard Latin Albums from the 2010s
