= La Más Completa Colección (Jenni Rivera album) =

La Más Completa Coleccion

Compilation album by Jenni Rivera
- Released: December 18, 2012
- Genre: Regional Mexican
- Label: Fonovisa

Jenni Rivera chronology
La Misma Gran Señora (2012)	La Más Completa Coleccion (2012)	1969 - Siempre, En Vivo Desde Monterrey, Parte 1 (2013)

La Más Completa Colección is a posthumous compilation album by regional Mexican singer Jenni Rivera, released on December 18, 2012.

== Track listing ==
=== Disc 1 ===
No.	Title	Length
1.	"Que Me Vas a Dar"
2.	"Se Marcho"
3.	"Imbecil"
4.	"Querida Socia"
5.	"Se las Voy a Dar a Otro"
6.	"Tristeza Pasajera - Ilusion Pasajera"
7.	"No Vas a Creer"
8.	"No Me Pregunten Por El"
9.	"Que Se Te Olvido"
10.	"Amiga Si Lo Ves"
11.	"De Contrabando"
12.	"Angel Baby"
13.	"Amiga Si Lo Ves (Pop Version)"

=== Disc 2 ===
No.	Title	Length
1.	"Me Siento Libre"
2.	"Jefa de Jefas"
3.	"Parrandera, Rebelde y Atrevida"
4.	"Reyna de Reynas"
5.	"Simplemente Lo Mejor"
6.	"Las Mismas Costumbres"
7.	"Mi Vida Loca"
8.	"Que Me Entierren Con la Banda (featuring Lupillo Rivera)"
9.	"Chicana Jalisciense"
10.	"Las Malandrinas"
11.	"Cuando Muere Una Dama"
12.	"Brincos Dieras"
13.	"Amiga Si Lo Ves (Norteña Version)"
14.	"Las Mismas Costumbres (Norteña Version)"

== Chart performance ==
Chart (2012)	Peak position
Mexico Top 100	7

Chart (2013)	Peak position
Mexico Top 100	13

== Sales and certifications ==
Region	Certification	Certified units/sales
Mexico (AMPROFON)	Platinum	60,000^{^}
^{^} Shipments figures based on certification alone.
