= 1969 – Siempre, En Vivo Desde Monterrey, Parte 2 =

Live album by Jenni Rivera
- Released: July 1, 2014
- Recorded: December 8, 2012
- Genre: Regional Mexican
- Label: Fonovisa
- Producer: Jenni Rivera

Jenni Rivera chronology
1969 – Siempre, En Vivo Desde Monterrey, Parte 1 (2013)	1969 – Siempre, En Vivo Desde Monterrey, Parte 2 (2014)	1 Vida – 3 Historias: Metamorfosis – Despedida de Culiacán – Jenni Vive 2013 (2014)

Target Deluxe edition Cover

Singles from 1969 – Siempre, En Vivo Desde Monterrey, Parte 2
- 1. "Resulta" Released: April 15, 2014

1969 – Siempre, En Vivo Desde Monterrey, Parte 2 is a live album by regional Mexican singer Jenni Rivera, released in 2014. It is Part 2 of a trilogy recording of her final concert in Monterrey, Nuevo León, Mexico, just three hours before her death.

== Reviews ==
"Recorded just hours before an airplane crash would take her life, 1969: Siempre, En Vivo Desde Monterrey, Pt. 2 captures Jenni Rivera's last concert, a show in Monterrey, Mexico on December 8, 2012. The singer's die-hard fans will appreciate owning this fiery, passionate bit of history, and the performances are top-notch, but unlike Pt. 1, which featured some soundboard recordings, the audio quality here is rough all around, sourced from the audience. It sounds cavernous and often distorts when the volume swells, but with no other recordings of the show available, fans will have to decide whether to deal with this document or pass." -Allmusic

== Track listing ==
No.	Title	Length
1.	"Presentación"	3:24
2.	"Mi Vida Loca"	2:39
3.	"Chuperamigos"	4:00
4.	"La Tequilera"	3:29
5.	"Ni Me Viene Ni Me Va"	2:49
6.	"¿Cuánto Te Debo?"	2:22
7.	"Tú Camisa Puesta"	1:33
8.	"Con Él"	1:55
9.	"Besos y Copas"	3:08
10.	"Buenas Noches Monterrey"	2:21
11.	"De Contrabando Intro"	2:53
12.	"De Contrabando"	3:01
13.	"La Deschichadera"	2:02
14.	"Lo Siento Mi Amor (Banda)"	3:56
15.	"Basta Ya (Banda)"	4:34
16.	"Resulta (Banda)"	3:50
17.	"Déjame Volver Contigo"	3:47
18.	"La Diferencia Intro"	1:30
19.	"La Diferencia"	3:17
20.	"No LLega El Olvido"	3:25

Target Deluxe Edition
No.	Title	Length
1.	"Presentactión (Opening)"	3:24
2.	"Mi Vida Loca"	2:39
3.	"Chuperamigos"	4:00
4.	"La Tequilera"	3:29
5.	"Ni Me Viene Ni Me Va"	2:49
6.	"¿Cuánto Te Debo?"	2:22
7.	"Tu Camisa Puesta"	1:33
8.	"Con Él"	1:55
9.	"Besos y Copas"	3:08
10.	"Buenas Noches Monterrey"	2:21
11.	"De Contrabando Intro"	2:53
12.	"De Contrabando"	3:01
13.	"La Deschichadera"	2:02
14.	"Lo Siento Mi Amor (Banda)"	3:56
15.	"¡Basta Ya! (Banda)"	4:34
16.	"Resulta (Banda)"	3:50
17.	"Johnny Lopez Insert (Commentary)"
18.	"No LLega El Olvido"	3:25
19.	"Déjame Volver Contigo"	3:47
20.	"Jenicka Lopez Insert (Commentary)"
21.	"La Diferencia Intro"	1:30
22.	"La Diferencia"	3:17
23.	"Michael Marin Insert (Commentary)"
24.	"Ya Lo Sé (En Vivo)(Exclusive)"
25.	"Resulta (Mariachi)(Exclusive)"
26.	"Jenicka Lopez Outro(Commentary)"

== Charts ==
=== Weekly charts ===
Chart (2014)	Peak position
US Billboard 200	27
US Top Latin Albums (Billboard)	1
US Regional Mexican Albums (Billboard)	1

=== Year-end charts ===
Chart (2014)	Position
US Top Latin Albums (Billboard)	12
US Regional Mexican Albums (Billboard)	5

== Awards and nominations ==
Year	Awards ceremony	Award	Result	Ref
2015	Latin Billboard Music Awards	Regional Mexican Album of the Year	Nominated	

== See also ==
- List of number-one Billboard Latin Albums from the 2010s
