= 1 Vida – 3 Historias: Metamorfosis – Despedida de Culiacán – Jenni Vive 2013 =

Live album by Jenni Rivera
- Released: December 2, 2014
- Recorded: November 23, 2012
- Genre: Regional Mexican
- Length: 38:16
- Label: Fonovisa; Universal Music Latin Entertainment

Jenni Rivera chronology
1969 – Siempre, En Vivo Desde Monterrey, Parte 2 (2014)	1 Vida – 3 Historias: Metamorfosis – Despedida de Culiacán – Jenni Vive 2013 (2014)	Paloma Negra Desde Monterrey (2016)

Singles from 1 Vida, 3 Historias,
- 1. "Querida Socia (En Vivo Desde Culiacán, México/2012)" Released: 2014; 2. "Se Las Voy A Dar A Otro (En Vivo Desde Culiacán, México/2012)" Released: 2014

1 Vida – 3 Historias: Metamorfosis – Despedida de Culiacán – Jenni Vive 2013 (English: One Life, Three Stories) is a posthumous live album by regional Mexican artist Jenni Rivera, which was released on December 2, 2014, through Fonovisa. The live album is combined with two DVDs consisting of interviews, music videos, clips, and a tribute concert. 1 Vida – 3 Historias peaked at number one on both Billboard Top Latin Albums and Regional Mexican Albums charts.

Professional ratings
Review scores
Source	Rating
Allmusic	3.5/5 stars

The collection represents three major components of Rivera's life: her work on-stage, her family, and her friends. The first component is represented by Despedida de Culiacán, a live album recorded during her last sold out appearance in Culiacán, Sinaloa, Mexico, on November 23, 2012.

The second disc is Metamorfosis, a documentary featuring interviews with her family along with several music videos and live concert clips. The last disc, Jenni Vive 2013, is a DVD of the tribute concert held one year after her death, featuring performances by her family and many close friends in the Latin music world. The DVD includes performances by some of Rivera's children, father, siblings and some of her very close friends such as Larry Hernández, La Original Banda El Limón, Chuy Lizarraga, Diana Reyes, Tito El Bambino and others.

== Track listing ==
1 Vida, 3 Historias, Despedida De Culiacán
No.	Title	Length
1.	"Qué Bonito es Culiacán (En Vivo Desde Culiacán, México/2012)"	0:55
2.	"Querida Socia (En Vivo Desde Culiacán, México/2012)"	2:18
3.	"Se Las Voy a Dar a Otro (En Vivo Desde Culiacán, México/2012)"	3:52
4.	"La Cara Bonita (En Vivo Desde Culiacán, México/2012)"	3:32
5.	"Porqué No le Calas (En Vivo Desde Culiacán, México/2012)"	3:01
6.	"Se le Hace Agua la Canoa (En Vivo Desde Culiacán, México/2012)"	1:49
7.	"La Gran Señora (En Vivo Desde Culiacán, México/2012)"	3:52
8.	"Inocente Pobre Amiga (En Vivo Desde Culiacán, México/2012)"	4:58
9.	"A Que No le Cuentas (En Vivo Desde Culiacán, México/2012)"	3:39
10.	"Saludos a Mi Gente (En Vivo Desde Culiacán, México/2012)"	0:56
11.	"Juro Que Nunca Volveré (En Vivo Desde Culiacán, México /2012)"	2:51
12.	"Trono Caído (En Vivo Desde Culiacán, México/2012)"	2:36
13.	"Cuando Muere una Dama (En Vivo Desde Staples Center, Los Angeles, CA/2011)"	4:50

Metamorfosis DVD
No.	Title	Length
1.	"Como Cualquier Otra Que Orgullo – Interview"
2.	"Aqui Estoy Su Inicio – Interview"
3.	"Besos y Copas en Vivo desde el Staples Center (Live from Staples Center"
4.	"El Camino Fue Negro Sus Batallas – Interview"
5.	"Madre Soltera en Vivo desde el Nokia 2010 (Live from Nokia Theater)"
6.	"Me Arrastre la Malandrina – Interview"
7.	"Las Malandrinas – Video"
8.	"Mis Alas Levante el Primer Concierto – Interview"
9.	"La Que Vive Cantando el Sacrificio – Interview"
10.	"Conciertos Favoritos #1 – La Oruga Transformando Chuperamigos – Plaza Monumental Tijuana"
11.	"Amiga Si Lo Vez – Video"
12.	"Conciertos Favoritos #2 Jacqie y Jenicka – Interview"
13.	"Angel Baby en Vivo desde Staples Center (Live from Staples Center)"
14.	"Canciones Favoritas #1 Que Vuela del Aplauso – Interview"
15.	"Por un Amor/ Cucurrucucu Paloma desde el Ford (Live from Ford Theater)"
16.	"Canciones Favoritas #2 Una Ultima Parranda – Interview"
17.	"Cuando Muere una Dama en Vivo desde Staples Center (Live from Staples Center)"
18.	"Canciones Favoritas #3 Mi Mente No Te Olvida – Interview"
19.	"No Llega el Olvido en Vivo desde Staples Center (Live from Staples Center)"
20.	"Para Usted Mama – Interview"
21.	"Resulta – Video"
22.	"El Verdadero Amor – Interview"
23.	"Creditos Mariposa de Barrio en Vivo del Nokia (Live from Nokia Theater)"

Jenni Vive 2013 DVD
No.	Title	Length
1.	"Introduccion Jenni Rivera"
2.	"Tú Estás Aquí"
3.	"Dos Botellas de Mezcal"
4.	"¿Donde Estas Presumida?"
5.	"Ya lo Sé"
6.	"A Quien le Pregunto"
7.	"Mirame"
8.	"Reproches al Viento"
9.	"El Distino"
10.	"Paloma Negra"
11.	"Amor Eterno"
12.	"Te Quede Muy Grande"
13.	"Me Refiero a Ti"
14.	"A Cambio de Que"
15.	"Aunque Sea a Escondidas"
16.	"Que Me Entierren Con la Banda"
17.	"Dame Tu Amor"
18.	"Gente VIP"
19.	"Arrastrando Las Patas"
20.	"Carita de Ángel"
21.	"El Ardido"
22.	"El Amor"
23.	"Acá Entre Nos"
24.	"No Llega el Olvido"
25.	"Dos Botellas de Mezcal"
26.	"Mariposa de Barrio"
27.	"Yo Te Agradezco"

== Charts ==
Chart (2014/2015)	Peak position
US Top Latin Albums (Billboard)	1
US Regional Mexican Albums (Billboard)	1

== Release history ==
Regions	Dates	Format(s)	Label(s)
United States	December 2, 2014	CD, digital download	Fonovisa
Mexico	December 2, 2014	CD, digital download	Fonovisa

== See also ==
- List of number-one Billboard Latin Albums from the 2010s
