= Los Dúo, Vol. 2 =

Studio album by Juan Gabriel
- Released: December 11, 2015
- Genre: Latin pop
- Label: Fonovisa
- Producer: Gustavo Farias

Juan Gabriel chronology
| Los Dúo (2015) | Los Dúo, Vol. 2 (2015) | Vestido de Etiqueta por Eduardo Magallanes (2016) |

Los Dúo, Vol. 2 is the twenty-ninth studio album by Mexican musician Juan Gabriel, released on December 11, 2015. It features artists performing duets with Juan Gabriel. The album won Album of the Year and Best Traditional Pop Vocal Album at the 17th Annual Latin Grammy Awards.

== Track listing ==
All tracks are written by Juan Gabriel.

| No. | Title | Length |
|---|---|---|
| 1. | "Te Quise Olvidar" (featuring Alejandro Fernández) | 4:29 |
| 2. | "Yo Te Recuerdo" (featuring Marc Anthony) | 3:34 |
| 3. | "No Discutamos" (featuring Paty Cantú) | 2:19 |
| 4. | "La Frontera" (featuring Julión Álvarez & J Balvin) | 4:43 |
| 5. | "Te Recuerdo Dulcemente" (featuring Andrés Calamaro) | 3:48 |
| 6. | "Te Sigo Amando" (featuring Belinda) | 3:58 |
| 7. | "Lágrimas y Lluvia" (featuring Joan Sebastian) | 6:20 |
| 8. | "Yo No Sé Qué Me Pasó" (featuring Carlos Rivera) | 4:42 |
| 9. | "Ya Lo Sé Que Tú Te Vas" (featuring Franco De Vita) | 4:02 |
| 10. | "Amor del Alma" (featuring José Feliciano) | 3:57 |
| 11. | "No Vale La Pena" (featuring María José) | 3:05 |
| 12. | "Muriendo de Amor" (featuring Miguel Poveda) | 6:14 |
| 13. | "Luna Llena" (featuring David Bustamante) | 5:00 |
| 14. | "Yo Te Perdono" (featuring Ana Gabriel) | 3:26 |
| 15. | "Yo Sé Que Está en Tu Corazón" (featuring Carla Morrison) | 4:06 |
| 16. | "No Tengo Dinero" (featuring Wisin) | 4:17 |

== DVD ==
A DVD was included as a bonus with the album.

| No. | Title | Length |
|---|---|---|
| 1. | "No Discutamos" |
| 2. | "Te Recuerdo Dulcemente" |
| 3. | "Si Quieres" |
| 4. | "La Frontera" |
| 5. | "Abrázame Muy Fuerte" |

== Charts ==
=== Weekly charts ===
| Chart (2015) | Peak position |
|---|---|
| Mexican Albums (AMPROFON) | 1 |
| US Billboard 200 | 114 |
| US Top Latin Albums (Billboard) | 1 |
| US Latin Pop Albums (Billboard) | 1 |
| Chart (2016) | Peak position |
| US Billboard 200 | 56 |

=== Year-end charts ===
| Chart (2015) | Position |
|---|---|
| Mexican Albums (AMPROFON) | 5 |
| Chart (2016) | Position |
| Mexican Albums (AMPROFON) | 3 |
| US Top Latin Albums (Billboard) | 1 |
| Chart (2017) | Position |
| Mexican Albums (AMPROFON) | 45 |
| US Top Latin Albums (Billboard) | 50 |

=== Certifications ===
| Region | Certification | Certified units/sales |
|---|---|---|
| Mexico (AMPROFON) | Diamond+Platinum | 360,000^{‡} |
| United States (RIAA) | 2× Platinum (Latin) | 120,000^{‡} |
^{‡} Sales+streaming figures based on certification alone.

== See also ==
- List of number-one albums of 2015 (Mexico)
- List of number-one Billboard Latin Albums from the 2010s
