= La Misma Gran Señora =

Compilation album by Jenni Rivera
- Released: November 13, 2012 (Mexico); December 11, 2012 (United States)
- Genre: Regional Mexican
- Length: 44:11
- Label: Fonovisa
- Producer: Jenni Rivera

Jenni Rivera chronology
Joyas Prestadas (2011)	La Misma Gran Señora (2012)	La Más Completa Colección (2012)

Professional ratings
Review scores
Source	Rating
Allmusic	4/5 stars

La Misma Gran Señora (The Same Great Lady) is a compilation album by regional Mexican singer Jenni Rivera, released by Fonovisa in the United States on December 11, 2012, just two days after the fatal plane crash that claimed her life along with six others.

La Misma Gran Señora reached number one on the Mexican Albums Chart and number one on the Billboard Top Latin Albums chart in the United States. It also reached number thirty-eight on the Billboard 200 in 2013 and 2014.

The album was said to be the best-selling Latin album of 2013. Since the album's release, it has been awarded one Billboard Music Award, three Latin Billboard Music Awards, and two Mexican Billboard Music Awards. In 2013, it won the Top Latin Album award at the 2013 Billboard Music Awards. It was also awarded Album of the Year at the 2013 Latin Billboard Music Awards and 2013 Mexican Billboard Music Awards. It also won Banda Album of the Year at the 2013 Mexican Billboard Music Awards. At the 2014 Latin Billboard Music Awards, it was awarded Regional Mexican Album of the Year and garnered a nomination for Album of the Year. By October 2013, La Misma Gran Señora had sold over 880,000 copies worldwide.

== Background ==
On October 1, 2012, Rivera's publicist announced Rivera filed for divorce from her husband Esteban Loaiza due to "irreconcilable differences on behalf of both parties derived from private circumstances that occurred during the lapse of their two-year marriage." The lead single that gave the album its name states "Yo sin ti seguiré siendo la misma gran señora, tu sin mi, nada vales en el mundo desde ahora" which translates to, "Me without you, I am still the great lady, you without me, you are nothing in the world anymore."

== Commercial performance ==
=== Album ===
In Mexico, La Misma Gran Señora peaked at number one on the Top 100 Mexico albums chart. It was certified double platinum and gold by Asociación Mexicana de Productores de Fonogramas y Videogramas (AMPROFON) for shipping 270,000 copies in the country. Meanwhile, in the United States, it also peaked at number one on the Billboard Top Latin Albums and Billboard Regional Mexican Albums charts. Released within two days of her death, sales for the album soared in the United States. The album sold 27,000 copies in its first week, becoming the highest Latin album debut of 2012. It was certified double platinum (Latin field) by the Recording Industry Association of America (RIAA) for shipments of 200,000 copies. La Misma Gran Señora was the best-selling Latin and Regional Mexican album of 2013 in the United States.

=== Singles ===
"La Misma Gran Señora", the lead single that gave the album its name peaked at number nine on the Hot Latin Songs in the United States in 2012 and 2013. It also peaked at number six on the Latin Regional Mexican Airplay in the United States in 2012 and 2013.

== Reception ==
David Jeffries of Allmusic gave the album a 4 of 5 stars and said "pick this Jenni Rivera collection over the others". At the 2013 Billboard Music Awards it was awarded Top Latin Album of the Year and Rivera was awarded Top Latin Artist of the Year. At the third Mexican Billboard Music Awards in 2013, it' received an award for Album of the Year and Banda Album of the Year. At the 2013 Latin Billboard Music Awards, it was awarded Album of the Year and Regional Mexican Album of the Year. At the 2013 Mexican Oye! Awards, "La Misma Gran Señora" was nominated for Popular Song of the Year. It was nominated for Album of the Year at the 2014 Latin Billboard Music Awards and recognized for Regional Mexican Album of the Year.

== Track listing ==
No.	Title	Writer(s)	Length
1.	"La Misma Gran Señora"	Homero Aguilar Cabrera	03:00
2.	"Resulta (Banda Version)"	Juan Gabriel	03:44
3.	"La Gran Señora"	Jenni Rivera	04:13
4.	"Ya Lo Sé"	Pepe Garza	03:25
5.	"¿Por Qué No Le Calas?"	Agustín Cejudo Moreno	03:26
6.	"Hermano Amigo"	María Felicitas Rojero De Gurrola	03:49
7.	"Trono Caído"	José Manuel Figueroa	02:38
8.	"Besos y Copas"	Víctor Cordero	03:37
9.	"Por Un Amor / Cucurrucucú Paloma"	Gilberto Parra, Tomás Méndez Sosa	03:40
10.	"Qué Me Va a Dar"	Alfonso García	03:11
11.	"No Vas a Creer"	Vicente Fernández	02:55
12.	"No Me Pregunten Por Él"	Carlos Peña	03:36
13.	"Ovarios"	Rivera	02:56

== Credits and personnel ==
The following credits are from Allmusic:

- Homero Aguilar Cabrera - Composer
- Victor Cordero - Composer
- Maria Felicitas Rojero De Gurrola - Composer
- Alfonso García F. - Composer
- Vicente Fernández - Composer
- José Manuel Figueroa - Composer
- Pepe Garza - Composer
- Agustín Cejudo Moreno - Composer
- Ramon Ortega - Composer
- Gilberto Parra - Composer
- Carlos Peña - Composer
- Jenni Rivera - Composer, Primary Artist
- Tomás Méndez Sosa - Composer
- Alberto Aguilera Valadez - Composer

== Charts ==
=== Weekly charts ===
Chart (2012)	Peak position
Mexican Albums (AMPROFON)	1
US Billboard 200	38
US Top Latin Albums (Billboard)	1
US Regional Mexican Albums (Billboard)	1

=== Year-end charts ===
Chart (2013)	Position
Mexican Albums (AMPROFON)	18
US Billboard 200	157
US Top Latin Albums (Billboard)	1

Chart (2014)	Position
US Top Latin Albums (Billboard)	30
US Regional Mexican Albums ( Billboard )	14

== Sales and certifications ==
Region	Certification	Certified units/sales
Mexico (AMPROFON)	2× Platinum+Gold	150,000^{^}
United States (RIAA)	2× Platinum (Latin)	200,000^{^}
^{^} Shipments figures based on certification alone.

== See also ==
- List of number-one Billboard Latin Albums from the 2010s
