= Luis Coronel =

American singer

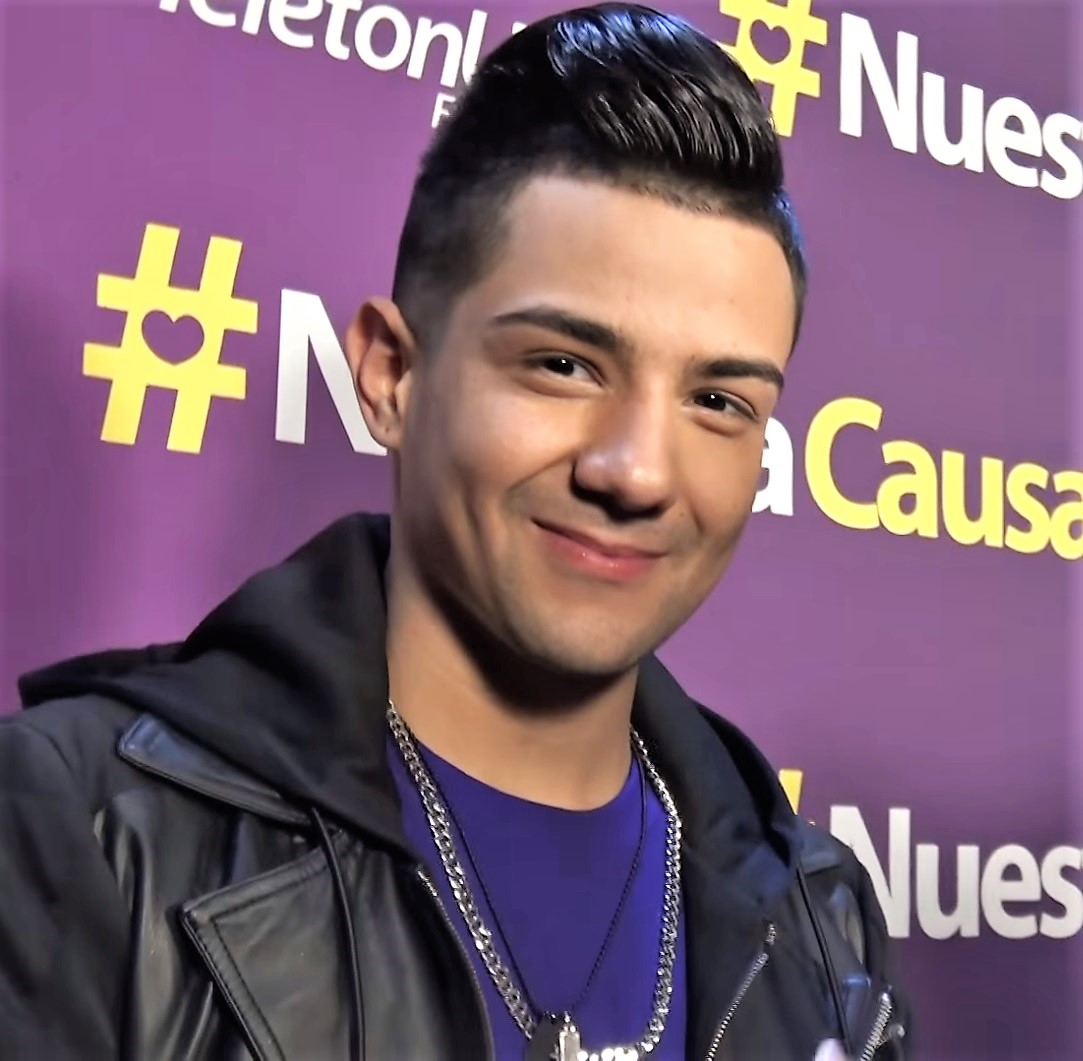
- Luís Coronel interviewed by Dulce Osuna in 2016

Background information
- Born: Luis Miguel Coronel Gámez; February 3, 1996 (age 30); Tucson, Arizona, U.S.
- Genre: Regional Mexican
- Occupation: Singer
- Instruments: Vocals, acoustic
- Years active: 2012–present
- Labels: DEL Records (2012–2017); Empire Productions, Inc. (2012–present); Sony Music Latin (2017–present)
- Website: luiscoronelmusic.com

Luis Miguel Coronel Gámez, better known as Luis Coronel, (born February 3, 1996) is an American singer of regional Mexican music.

== Career ==
Luis Coronel uploaded tons of videos of himself singing, but one caught the eye of Del Records. He recorded himself singing to his girlfriend at the time and uploaded it to his Facebook account by using the computer that was in the boxing gym. He was signed by Del Records at the age of sixteen.

== Music ==
Some of his singles, including "Mi niña traviesa," "Será más fácil," and "Escápate," have reached spots on Billboard charts. In September 2013, he released his debut album, Con la frente en alto, and within three weeks of its release, it earned a spot on the Billboard Regional Mexican Albums chart. It was certified gold in the Latin field by the RIAA for shipping 30,000 copies. Coronel won the award for "New Artist of the Year" at the 2014 Latin Billboard Music Awards. He garnered a nomination for Male Artist of the Year in the Regional Mexican category at the 27th Lo Nuestro Awards.

== Discography ==
=== Studio albums ===
Year	Title	Details	Chart positions			Certifications
Year	Title	Details	US	US Latin	US Regional Mexican Albums	Certifications
2013	Con la frente en alto	Label: Del Records; Released: September 17, 2013	80	2	1	RIAA: Gold (Latin)
2014	Quiero ser tu dueño	Label: Del Records; Released: September 30, 2014	33	1	1	RIAA: Gold (Latin)
2017	Ahora soy yo	Label: Sony Music Latin; Released: October 20, 2017	121	2		
2022	Dentro de Mis Ojos	Label: Sony Music Latin; Released: May 20, 2022				

== Awards and nominations ==
Year	Award	Category	Nominated works	Result	Ref.
2014	Latin Billboard Music Awards	New Artist of the Year	Himself	Won	
2014	Premios Tu Mundo	Feeling Social	Himself	Nominated	
2015	Premios Lo Nuestro	Regional Mexican Male Artist of the Year	Himself	Won	
2015	Latin Billboard Music Awards	Regional Mexican Albums Artist of the Year, Solo	Himself	Nominated	
2015	Premios Juventud	It Was All	"Quiero ser tu dueño"	Won	
2015	Premios Juventud	Voice of The Moment	Himself	Won	
2015	Premios Juventud	My Regional Mexican Artist	Himself	Won	
2015	Latin American Music Awards	Favorite Regional Mexican Male Artist	Himself	Won	
2015	Premios de la Radio	Premio Orgullo Latino	Himself	Won	
