= 1969 – Siempre, En Vivo Desde Monterrey, Parte 1 =

1969 – Siempre, En Vivo Desde Monterrey Parte 1

Live album by Jenni Rivera
- Released: December 3, 2013
- Recorded: December 8, 2012
- Genre: Regional Mexican
- Label: Fonovisa
- Producer: Jenni Rivera

Jenni Rivera chronology
La Más Completa Colección (2012)	1969 – Siempre, En Vivo Desde Monterrey Parte 1 (2013)	1969 – Siempre, En Vivo Desde Monterrey, Parte 2 (2014)

Professional ratings
Review scores
Source	Rating
Allmusic	3/5 stars

1969 – Siempre, En Vivo Desde Monterrey, Parte 1 is a live album released by regional Mexican singer Jenni Rivera, released on December 3, 2013. It is Part 1 of a trilogy recorded live in her final concert in Monterrey, Nuevo León, Mexico, just three hours before her death. The second part, 1969 – Siempre, En Vivo Desde Monterrey, Parte 2 was released on July 2, 2014 (what would have been Rivera's 45th birthday).

1969 – Siempre, En Vivo Desde Monterrey, Parte 1 reached number two on the Mexican Albums Chart and number one on the Billboard Top Latin Albums chart in the United States. It also reached number twenty-five on the Billboard 200 in 2013 and 2014. It also debuted at one on the Billboard Top Regional Mexican Albums.

1969 – Siempre, En Vivo Desde Monterrey, Parte 1 was certified platinum (Latin field) by the Recording Industry Association of America (RIAA) for shipments of 28,000 copies. In Mexico it was certified platinum by Asociación Mexicana de Productores de Fonogramas y Videogramas (AMPROFON) for shipment of 60,000 copies. It was nominated for Top Latin Album of the Year at the 2014 Billboard Music Awards.

== Reviews ==
AllMusic gave the live album a mixed review, saying that the album shows, "another outstanding and powerful concert from the banda and norteño singer," but adding that the recording quality of the album comes off as, "a rough, audience-recorded bootleg."

No.	Title	Length
1.	"Intro"
2.	"Dos Botellas de Mezcal (Live)"
3.	"Que Me Entierren con la Banda (popurri)"
4.	"Rosita Alvírez (popurri)"
5.	"Vida Prestada (popurri)"
6.	"Se Les Peló Baltazar (popurri)"
7.	"Clave Privada (popurri)"
8.	"El Moreño (popurri)"
9.	"Dos Botellas de Mezcal (popurri)"
10.	"Interlude"
11.	"Amiga Si Lo Vez"
12.	"Que Ganas de No Verte Nunca Más"
13.	"A Que No Le Cuentas"
14.	"Señora"
15.	"Así Fue"
16.	"Porque Me Gustas a Morir"
17.	"Outro"
18.	"Amarga Navidad (Live Dec 8, 2012 recorded)"

== Disc 2 ==
No.	Title	Length
1.	"Oruga"
2.	"Amor de Fans"
3.	"Mariposa de Barrio"
4.	"Mas Amor de Fans"
5.	"Último Ensayo"

== Charts ==
=== Weekly charts ===
Chart (2013/2014)	Peak position
Mexican Albums Chart (AMPROFON)	2
US Billboard 200	25
US Top Latin Albums (Billboard)	1
US Regional Mexican Albums (Billboard)	1

=== Year-end charts ===
Chart (2014)	Position
US Top Latin Albums	4
US Regional Mexican Albums	1

== Sales and certifications ==
Region	Certification	Certified units/sales
Mexico (AMPROFON)	Platinum	60,000^{^}
United States (RIAA)	Platinum (Latin)	28,000
^{^} Shipments figures based on certification alone.

== Awards and nominations ==
Year	Awards ceremony	Award	Results
2014	Billboard Music Awards	Top Latin Album	Nominated

== See also ==
- List of number-one Billboard Latin Albums from the 2010s
- Year-end best selling Regional Mexican Albums
