= Vestido de Etiqueta por Eduardo Magallanes =

Studio album by Juan Gabriel
- Released: August 12, 2016
- Genre: Latin pop
- Label: Fonovisa
- Producer: Juan Gabriel

Juan Gabriel chronology
Los Dúo, Vol. 2 (2015)	Vestido de Etiqueta por Eduardo Magallanes (2016)	Los Dúo, Vol. 3 (2022)

Vestido de Etiqueta por Eduardo Magallanes (Dressed in Etiquette by Eduardo Magallanes) is the thirtieth studio album by Mexican musician Juan Gabriel, released on August 12, 2016. A bonus DVD was included.

Vestido de Etiqueta por Eduardo Magallanes reached number one on the Billboard Top Latin Albums chart in the United States.

== Disc 1 ==
All tracks are written by Juan Gabriel.

No.	Title	Length
1.	"Solo Sé Que Fue Un Marzo"	4:08
2.	"Tu Dijiste Adiós"	3:32
3.	"Te Lo Pido Por Favor"	3:36
4.	"Cuando Seas Mi Mujer"	4:19
5.	"Siempre Estoy Pensando en Ti"	3:32
6.	"Ya No Insistas Corazón"	3:12
7.	"Otra Vez Me Enamoré"	3:42
8.	"Ya Lo Sé Que Tú Te Vas"	4:39
9.	"Yo Me Voy"	3:10
10.	"Vives en Mí"	4:01
11.	"Hasta Que Te Conocí"	8:19
12.	"El Día de los Novios"	3:24
13.	"Lily"	5:40
14.	"¿Por Qué Fue Que Te Amé?"	4:28
15.	"No Me Arrepiento de Nada"	4:35
16.	"La Muerte del Palomo"	4:42
17.	"La Luna"	4:33

== Disc 2 ==
All tracks are written by Juan Gabriel.

No.	Title	Length
1.	"Mis Ojos Tristes"	4:08
2.	"Si Quieres"	6:36
3.	"Es Mejor Perdonar"	4:31
4.	"No Tengas Miedo"	4:18
5.	"Mañana Te Acordarás"	4:57
6.	"Por Ser Como Eres/Llevando El Ritmo"	7:53
7.	"Imaginación"	4:47
8.	"Dímelo"	5:25
9.	"Amor del Alma"	5:19
10.	"Me Despertó La Realidad"	3:02
11.	"No Es Bueno Que Te Vayas"	3:09
12.	"Se Me Olvidó Otra Vez" (featuring Olivia Gorra)	4:29
13.	"Una Oración" (featuring La India)	4:14
14.	"Tres Claveles y Un Rosal"	3:44
15.	"Yo No Digo Que Te Amo"	3:44
16.	"Voy a Comprobarte"	3:38
17.	"No Quiero"	10:19

== DVD ==
No.	Title	Length
1.	"La Muerte del Palomo"
2.	"Si Quieres"
3.	"Hasta Que Te Conocí"
4.	"Ya No Insistas Corazón"
5.	"Ya Lo Sé Que Tú Te Vas"
6.	"Por Ser Como Eres/Llevando El Ritmo"
7.	"Se Me Olvidó Otra Vez"

The production of the video clips took place at the Peón Contreras theater in the city of Mérida, with the participation of Juan Gabriel's personal videographer, Jesús Ochoa from Juarez, of whom some unpublished videos remain.

== Promotion ==
Juan Gabriel embarked on the Mexico Es Todo Tour performing his final concert at The Forum in Inglewood, California.

== Charts ==
=== Weekly charts ===
Chart (2016)	Peak position
Mexican Albums (AMPROFON)	1
Spanish Albums (PROMUSICAE)	55
US Billboard 200	128
US Top Latin Albums (Billboard)	1
US Latin Pop Albums (Billboard)	1

=== Year-end charts ===
Chart (2016)	Peak position
Mexican Albums (AMPROFON)	7
US Billboard Latin Albums	6
Chart (2017)	Peak position
Mexican Albums (AMPROFON)	96

=== Certifications ===
Region	Certification	Certified units/sales
Mexico (AMPROFON)	Platinum+Gold	90,000^{‡}
United States (RIAA)	Platinum (Latin)	60,000^{‡}
^{‡} Sales+streaming figures based on certification alone.
