= 3.0 (Marc Anthony album) =

Studio album by Marc Anthony
- Released: July 23, 2013
- Recorded: 2011–13
- Genres: Salsa; tropical; Bolero
- Length: 41:26
- Labels: Sony Music Latin; Columbia
- Producer: Sergio George

Marc Anthony chronology
Iconos (2010)	3.0 (2013)	Opus (2019)

Singles from 3.0
- 1. "Vivir Mi Vida" Released: April 26, 2013; 2. "Cambio de Piel" Released: October 10, 2013; 3. "Flor Pálida" Released: October 17, 2014; 4. "La Copa Rota" Released: April 16, 2015; 5. "Volver a Comenzar" Released: October 4, 2015

Professional ratings
Review scores
Source	Rating
AllMusic	5/5 stars

3.0 is the ninth Spanish album and eleventh studio album by American recording artist Marc Anthony. It was released on July 23, 2013. It is his first original salsa album in over a decade. "Vivir Mi Vida," a Spanish cover of the Khaled song "C'est la vie", was released as the first single on April 15, 2013. "Cambio de Piel" was released as the second single on October 8, 2013. The album was nominated for Album of the Year and won Best Salsa Album at the 2014 Latin Grammy Awards.

== Commercial performance ==
3.0 debuted at number 5 on the US Billboard 200, selling 47,000 copies in its first week. The album is certified 13× platinum (Latin) by the RIAA.

== Track listing ==
No.	Title	Writer(s)	Length
1.	"Vivir Mi Vida"	Khaled; RedOne; Alex Papaconstantinou; Björn Djupström; Bilal Hajji	4:15
2.	"Volver a Comenzar"	Adriana Lucia	4:32
3.	"Flor Pálida"	Polo Montañez	4:35
4.	"Cambio de Piel"	Julio Reyes	4:36
5.	"Espera"	Ettore Grenci; Monica Velez	3:58
6.	"La Copa Rota"	Benito de Jesús	3:28
7.	"Dime Si No Es Verdad"	Luísito Berrios	4:02
8.	"Hipocresía"	Reyes	4:29
9.	"Cautivo de Este Amor"	Reyes	3:36
10.	"Vivir Mi Vida" (Versión Pop)	Khaled; RedOne; Papaconstantinou; Djupström; Hajji	3:55
Total length:			41:26

"Vivir Mi Vida"
Sample from the first single "Vivir Mi Vida"

== Charts ==
=== Weekly charts ===
Chart (2013)	Peak position
Belgian Albums (Ultratop Flanders)	185
Colombian Albums (Prodiscos)	1
Italian Albums (FIMI)	48
Mexican Albums (Top 100 Mexico)	2
Peruvian Albums (PhantomMusicStore)	1
Dutch Albums (Album Top 100)	62
Spanish Albums (Promusicae)	1
Swiss Albums (Schweizer Hitparade)	59
US Billboard 200	5
US Top Latin Albums (Billboard)	1
US Tropical Albums (Billboard)	1
Uruguayan Albums (CUD)	1
Venezuelan Albums (Recordland)	1

=== Year-end charts ===
Chart (2013)	Position
Argentinian Albums (CAPIF)	18
Spain (PROMUSICAE)	22
US Top Latin Albums (Billboard)	2
US Tropical Albums (Billboard)	1
Chart (2014)	Position
Mexican Albums	19
US Top Latin Albums (Billboard)	3
US Tropical Albums (Billboard)	2
Chart (2015)	Position
US Top Latin Albums (Billboard)	16
US Tropical Albums (Billboard)	3
Chart (2016)	Position
US Top Latin Albums (Billboard)	45
Chart (2017)	Position
US Top Latin Albums (Billboard)	27
Chart (2018)	Position
US Top Latin Albums (Billboard)	26

== Sales and certifications ==
Region	Certification	Certified units/sales
Argentina (CAPIF)	Gold	20,000^{^}
Central America (CFC)	Gold	5,000
Chile	Platinum	
Colombia	Platinum	
Mexico (AMPROFON)	4× Platinum	240,000^{‡}
Spain (Promusicae)	Gold	20,000^{^}
United States (RIAA)	13× Platinum (Latin)	780,000^{‡}
Uruguay (CUD)	Platinum	4,000^{^}
Venezuela	Platinum	
^{^} Shipments figures based on certification alone.^{‡} Sales+streaming figures based on certification alone.

== See also ==
- Lo Nuestro Award for Tropical Album of the Year
