= Confidencias (Alejandro Fernández album) =

Studio album by Alejandro Fernández
- Released: 27 August 2013
- Recorded: 2012–2013
- Genre: Latin pop
- Length: 43:04
- Label: Universal Music Latino
- Producer: Phil Ramone

Alejandro Fernández chronology
Dos Mundos: Evolución + Tradición (2009)	Confidencias (2013)	Rompiendo Fronteras (2017)

Singles from Confidencias
- 1. "Hoy Tengo Ganas de Ti" Released: 8 May 2013; 2. "Me Olvidé de Vivir" Released: 22 October 2013

Confidencias (English: Confidences) is the fifteenth studio album and the second covers album recorded by the Mexican pop singer Alejandro Fernández. It was released internationally on 27 August 2013.

== Track listing ==
- Standard edition

Confidencias
No.	Title	Writer(s)	Length
1.	"Te Quiero, Te Quiero"	Augusto Algueró Dasca / Rafael DeLeon	3:26
2.	"A Pesar De Todo"	Nelson Ned	3:21
3.	"Cóncavo Y Convexo"	Erasmo Carlos / Roberto Carlos / Buddy McCluskey / Mary McCluskey	4:26
4.	"Hoy Tengo Ganas de Ti" (featuring Christina Aguilera)	Jose Miguel Gallardo Vera	4:52
5.	"Procuro Olvidarte"	Manuel Alejandro / Ana Magdalena	4:08
6.	"Por Qué Te Vas"	José Luis Perales	3:16
7.	"Nobody Knows You When You're Down and Out" (featuring Rod Stewart)	Jimmie Cox	3:53
8.	"Cenizas"	Wello Rivas	4:04
9.	"Desahogo"	Erasmo Carlos / Roberto Carlos / Buddy McCluskey / Mary McCluskey	2:49
10.	"Me Olvidé De Vivir" (featuring Vicente Fernández)	Pierre Billon / Jacques Revaux	5:28
11.	"Olvidarte"	Denisse De Kalafe	3:21
Total length:			43:04

Argentina Confidencias - Edición estándar - Bonus track
No.	Title	Writer(s)	Length
12.	"Miénteme"	Augusto Amicón / Sebastián Bazán / Karen Oliver	3:53

- Deluxe edition

Confidencias - Edición deluxe
No.	Title	Writer(s)	Length
12.	"Hoy tengo ganas de ti" (Solo version)	Jose Miguel Gallardo Vera	4:46
13.	"Me Olvidé de Vivir" (Solo version)	Pierre Billon / Jacques Revaux	5:28
14.	"Te Soñé"		4:38

Confidencias - Edición deluxe - DVD
No.	Title	Length
1.	"Documental de grabación del disco" (Includes images of Phil Ramone)
2.	"Track by track del álbum"
3.	"Hoy tengo ganas de ti" (Musical video)
4.	"Hoy tengo ganas de ti" (Behind the scenes)

== Charts ==
=== Weekly charts ===
Chart (2013)	Peak position
Spanish Albums (Promusicae)	1
US Billboard 200	19
US Top Latin Albums (Billboard)	1
US Latin Pop Albums (Billboard)	1

=== Year-end charts ===
Chart (2013)	Position
Spanish Albums (PROMUSICAE)	13
US Top Latin Albums (Billboard)	5
Chart (2014)	Position
Spanish Albums (PROMUSICAE)	46
US Top Latin Albums (Billboard)	19

== Certifications ==
Region	Certification	Certified units/sales
Mexico (AMPROFON)	4× Platinum+Gold	270,000^{^}
Spain (Promusicae)	Platinum	40,000^{^}
^{^} Shipments figures based on certification alone.
