= Roberto Tapia =

American singer of Mexican ancestry (born 1981)

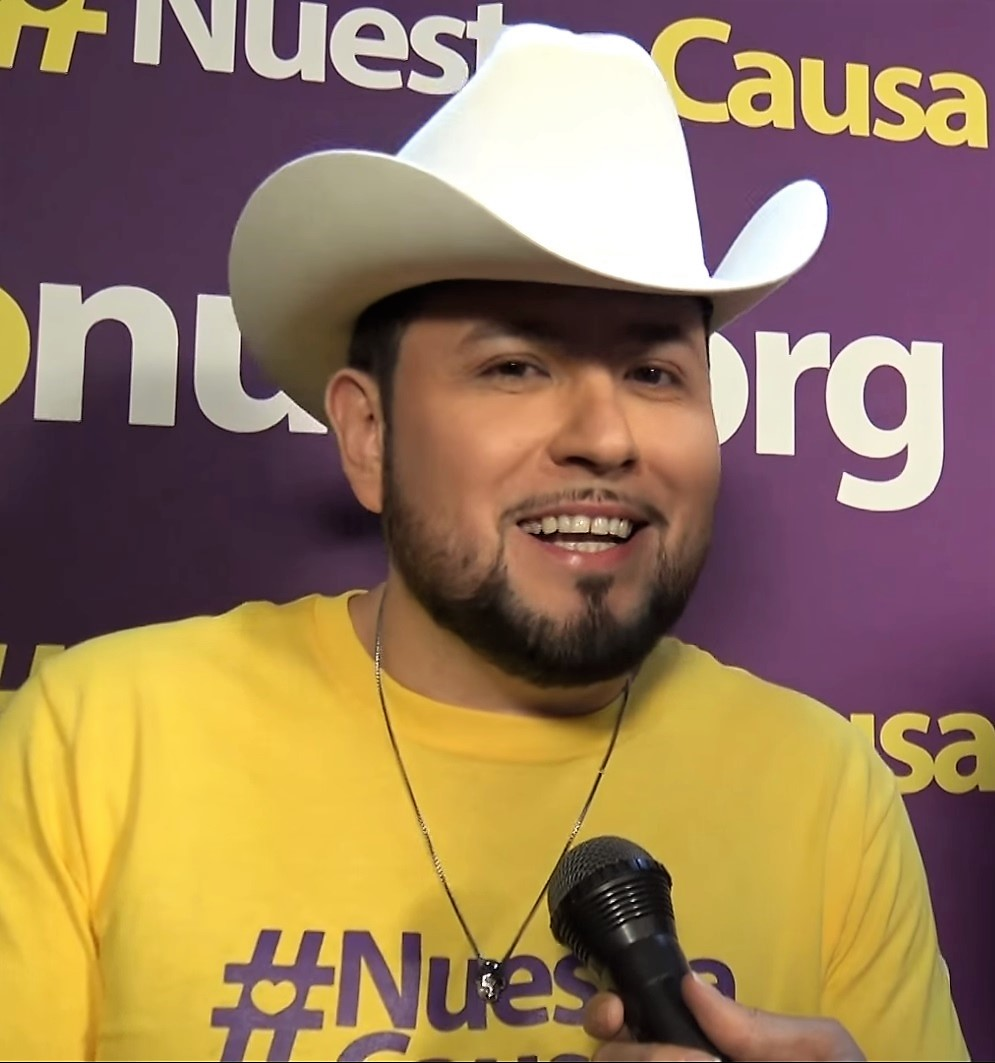
- Tapia interviewed by Dulce Osuna in 2016

Background information
- Born: Carlos Roberto Aguirre Tapia; February 3, 1981 (age 45); San Diego, California, U.S.
- Origin: Culiacán, Sinaloa, Mexico
- Genres: Banda; Pacific Norteño; mariachi
- Occupations: Singer-songwriter; record producer
- Years active: 2008–present
- Label: Universal (2008–present)
- Website: www.mm-group.org/talent/roberto-tapia/

Roberto Tapia (born February 3, 1981) is an American singer of Mexican ancestry. He was born in San Diego, California and raised in Culiacán, Sinaloa, Mexico. He adopted the regional Mexican genre and in August 2012, his album El Muchacho hit number one on Billboard's Top Latin Albums chart. Tapia was one of three coaches on the first two seasons of La Voz Kids (The Voice Kids), a Spanish-language version of The Voice featuring American Spanish-speaking children on the Telemundo Network. He became a businessman in the year of 2013, promoting restaurants, while still continuing as a singer.

== Early life ==
Hailing from Lake Forest, California, Tapia's parents migrated to the United States before his birth. Tapia was born in San Diego. His family then decided to relocate to Mexico. Tapia spent much of his youth in Culiacán, Sinaloa, where, at age 9, he entered the Difocur School of music in Culiacán, now known as the Instituto Sinaloense de Cultura (Sinaloan Institute of Culture). Tapia specialized in clarinet, but also learned guitar and percussion instruments. During this time, Tapia gained experience by performing with acts such as the Symphony of Sinaloa.

At 13, the Tapia family returned to the US. Initially reluctant, Tapia was convinced by family and friends to perform at local venues such as dance halls and receptions. Before signing with a professional label, Tapia went door to door at record shops attempting to sell his recordings. At 17, Tapia's professional debut performance came in Tijuana, Baja California alongside fellow Sinaloan artist El Lobito de Sinaloa. Tapia signed with Sony International and began his first album, blending his regional Norteño music with hints of electronica and hip hop.

== Career ==
Roberto Tapia performances include the Nokia Theater in Los Angeles, California and the Oregon Convention Center in Portland.

He has appeared on Latin Billboard Awards, LATV, and Universal Music Latino.

In 2011, Tapia appeared at the Plaza Mexico in Lynwood, CA to celebrate Mexico's Independence.

In honor of his hometown, Roberto performed at El Palenque de Culiacán to celebrate the Feria Ganadera de Culiacán (Culiacán Cattle Fair), an annual traditional festival celebrating the Mexican Revolution, where locals share music, culture and food.

== Discography ==
=== 2002- Roberto Tapia (Self-Titled) [Sony International] ===
Released: March 18, 2002

==== Tracks ====
- Entrega de Amor (2:29) Delivery of Love
- Loco, Loco (3:10) Crazy, Crazy
- Celos (2:51) Jealousy
- Por Una Mentira (3:14) For a Lie
- Inolvidable (3:13) Unforgettable
- Te Amo, Te Amo (3:35) I Love You, I Love You
- Que el Mundo Ruede (2:49) May The World Revolve
- Incompleto (3:48) Incomplete
- Cuando un Amor (2:47) When a Love
- Que Locura (3:47) What Craziness/Madness
- Te Traigo Ganas (2:44) I’ve Been Yearning For You
- Amores Como el Nuestro (2:51) Love Like Ours

=== 2008- Los Amigos del M (Machete Music) ===
Released: January 29, 2008

==== Tracks ====
- Pensé Que Te Había Olvidado (2:59) Thought I Had Forgotten You
- Los Amigos del M (3:39) The Friends of M
- Las Edades (2:51) Our Ages
- Mi Gran Tesoro (3:17) My Grand Treasure
- El Corrido de Chalo Araujo (3:43) The Ballad of Chalo Araujo (A man linked to the death of singer Chalino Sánchez)
- Le Semana Completita (3:04) The Week Completely
- Corrido del Frankie (2:28) Frankies’ Ballad
- Por Verte Felíz (3:25) To See You Happy
- El Hijo del Mayo (2:36) The Son of El Mayo
- Pa' Que Quieres Que Vuelva (2:28) Why Do You Want Me To Return
- El Corrido del Ranchero (3:20) The Ballad of the Rancher
- El Amanecido (3:05) The Hungover Guy
- El Corrido del Bitache (2:58) The Ballad of Bitache

=== 2009- El Niño De la Tuna (Fonovisa) ===
Released: May 26, 2009 The corrido "El Niño de la Tuna" described Joaquín "El Chapo" Guzmán's life story and was his first hit single.

==== Tracks ====
- Mi Gran Amor (2:58) My Great Love
- El Niño de la Tuna (3:39)
- Como Me Engañaste (3:46) How Did You Deceive Me
- Pancho Loco (3:25) Crazy Pancho
- Desilusión (2:46) Delusion
- El Maserati (2:30) The Maserati
- Caminos Differentes (2:56) Different Paths
- Gente de Guzmán (3:30) Guzmán's People
- La Tambora (2:29) The Drum
- Iván el Chapito (3:32) Ivan the Chapito (Iván Archivaldo Guzmán Salazar)
- Cuando Me Dices Mi Amor (2:40) When You Call Me "My Love"
- El Animal (2:39) The Animal
- Skit (1:20)
- El Gallo de Sinaloa (3:02) The Rooster of Sinaloa

=== 2010- La Batalla (Fonovisa) ===
Released: September 7, 2010

==== Tracks ====
- Brazo Armado (3:02) Armed Wing
- No Fue Fácil (3:27) It Wasn't Easy
- El Cachorro del Animal (3:45) The Animal's Offspring
- No Pensaba Enamorarme (3:19) I Didn't Think Of Falling In Love
- La Batalla (3:33) The Battle
- Me Duele (3:22) It Hurts
- Bandera del Chapo (3:49) El Chapo's Flag
- Qué Te Faltó (3:12) What Else Did You Need
- El Jefe de la Familia (3:04) The Boss of the Family
- Tal Vez (3:06) Maybe
- Las Calaveras del Chino (2:25) The Skeletons of El Chino
- Tú También Fallaste (3:05) You Too Failed
- Comandos del Yupo (3:42) Yupo's Commandments
- La Charla (3:36) The Talk

=== 2011-El Corrido del niño (La Disco Music /Twins Enterprise) ===
Released: October 11, 2011. While this album included narcocorridos, the death of his cousin Alonso reduced his use of such lyrics.

==== Tracks ====
- Amor Limosnero (2:17) A Beggar's Love
- El Corrido del Niño (2:22) The Ballad of the Boy
- Estúpido Por Ti (3:09) Stupid For You
- Flor Hermosa (2:36) Beautiful Flower
- Me Dan Miedo Las Noches (2:28) The Nights Scare Me
- Me Importa Poco La Muerte (2:05) Death Means Little To Me
- Me Las Vas A Dar (2:31) You Will Give Them To Me
- Pechos Calientes (2:44) Hot Chests
- Sin Hablar (2:31) Without Speaking
- Te Quiero Comer La Boca (2:42) I Want To French Kiss You
- Una Noche No (2:23) One Night, No
- Ya Sabías Que Era Casado (2:38) You Already Knew I Was Married

=== 2011- Live (Fonovisa) ===
Recorded during his sold-out concert at the Los Angeles Nokia Theater. This album was awarded the Regional Mexican Album and Top Latin Albums in 2011.

==== Tracks ====
- Me Duele (3:56) "It Hurts"
- Por Verte Feliz (3:15) "To See You Happy"
- Amigos Del M (3:34) "M's Friends"
- Iván El Chapito (3:29) "Iván the Chapito" (Iván Archivaldo Guzmán Salazar)
- Las Edades (6:07) "Ages"
- Como me Engañaste (4:29) "How You Tricked Me"
- Pancho Loco (3:49) "Crazy Pancho"
- El Maserati (2:35) "The Maserati"
- El Niño De La Tuna (3:43) "The Boy from La Tuna" (Joaquín "El Chapo" Guzmán)
- El Animal (2:32) "The Animal"
- Hijo Del Mayo (2:50) "El Mayo's Son"
- Caminos Diferentes (5:12) "Different Paths"
- Comandos Del Yupo (3:45) "El Yupo's Commandos"

=== 2012- El Muchacho (Fonovisa) ===
Released Date: July 24, 2012 El Muchacho reached first place in the “Hot Latin Albums” and “Regional Mexican Sales” Billboard charts. El Muchacho earned titles including Top Latin Albums, Regional Mexican Albums, The Billboard 200 and Top Latin Albums. Los Premios de la Radio (The Radio Awards) nominated Roberto Tapia as Artist of the year, male artist of the year and the best banda song ‘Mirando al Cielo’ in 2012.

==== Tracks ====
- El Muchacho (4:25) The Guy
- Crei (3:14) I Thought
- La Carta Fuerte (3:19) The Strong Letter
- Le Pregunte Al Corazon (3:24) I Asked My Love
- El Mini Lic (3:04) The Mini Lic
- Mirando Al Cielo (3:59) Looking at the Sky
- La posada (3:41) The Posada
- Amor Perdido (3:29) Lost Love
- El Michoacano (2:55) The Man from Michoacán
- Que Raro Se Siente Todo (3:01) How Weird It All Feels
- Ahora Que Te Conoci (3:02) Now That I’ve Met You
- Ya Me Siento Como Nuevo (3:22) I Already Feel Like New
