= Julio Reyes =

- Born: Georgel Julio Arevalo Reyes; January 18, 1985 (age 41); Monterrey, Nuevo León, Mexico
- Occupations: Singer; songwriter; vocal producer; actor
- Spouse: Guillermo Rosas (m. 2016)
- Musical career
- Genres: Latin; pop; ranchero; soul; jazz; R&B
- Labels: Cosmica Records, BMI
- Website: Julio Reyes on Facebook

Georgel Julio Arevalo Reyes-Rosas (born January 18, 1985), known professionally as Julio Reyes, is a Mexican singer, songwriter, musician, actor, voice coach and vocal producer. A graduate of Berklee College with a degree in vocal performance and composition, he is currently based in Los Angeles. After making it to the finals in the 2012 competition Tengo Talento, Mucho Talento on Estrella TV, later that year he released his debut album No Inventes on Sony Music Latin. The lead single "No Inventes" peaked at No. 40 on the Billboard Regional Mexican Songs Chart.

His music has been used in the soundtracks for shows such as Dos Hogares, and in 2014 he made his acting debut as the lead role in Pecado Mortal: Historias de Corrido, where he plays an assassin. In 2015, Reyes released a video and track titled "Me Canse De Rogarte," the first single of his upcoming album Region*Al*Ternativo. He has co-written songs for pop artists such as Chiquis, Gloria Trevi and Anahí, several of which charted prominently on Billboard.

== Early life and education ==
Georgel Julio Arevalo Reyes was born on January 18, 1985, in Monterrey, Nuevo León, Mexico. Inspired by the mariachi vocals of his mother, Georgina Reyes, at a young age, he and his brothers would often put on musical performances for their family. Reyes was also inspired to go into music by his grandfather, a musician and singer of Jalisco heritage. Reyes attended Berklee College in Boston, Massachusetts after winning a full music scholarship at age seventeen. After four years of practicing diverse genres such as jazz and soul and learning composition, production, music theory, and vocal performance, he moved to Los Angeles.

== Career ==
=== Early years (2010–2014) ===
In 2012 Reyes was a finalist at the talent competition Tengo Talento, Mucho Talento on Estrella TV as "Julio Arevalo." Afterwards, he released his original song "No Puedo Regresar" and attracted the attention of Sony Music. In August 2012, Sony Music Latin released Reyes' debut album No Inventes to favorable reviews in the United States and Mexico. The twelve songs were completed over a two-year time period, and the lead single "No Inventes" peaked at No. 40 on the Billboard Regional Mexican Songs Chart. "Recompense" was the second single from the album to chart. In September 2013, he performed at a Noche Bohemia showcase series in Encino, California.

He was nominated in the "Artista Revelación del Año" (newcomer artist of the year) category at Premios Texas 2013.

In 2014, his original song "Sin Verguenza" was featured in the Televisa soap opera Dos Hogares. Also in 2014, Reyes made his acting debut as the title role in the film Pecado Mortal: Historias de Corrido, where he plays an assassin. The show debuted in January 2014 on the Fox channel Mundo, and was distributed by Cine Latino. His track "Sin Verguenza" was used as the main movie theme. Afterwards, he performed a BMI showcase with other regional Mexican performers.

=== Recent projects (2015) ===
External videos
- Julio Reyes – "No Inventes" Music Video (Aug 4, 2012)
- Julio Reyes – "Me Canse De Rogarte" Music Video (May 25, 2015)

In 2015, Reyes released a video and track titled "Me Canse De Rogarte", the first single of his upcoming album set for fall release. The upcoming project, titled Region*Al*Ternativo, employs genres such as soul, R&B, and ranchero, among others. Produced by Ulises Lozano, it features a number of guest female vocalists.

The track "Paloma Negra" where both Chiquis and Julio perform as a duet is a writing collaboration between T.Mendez, Reyes, U.Lozano and Chiquis. The song is included in her debut album Ahora in 2014 on Sony Music Latin. Reyes also worked on a vocal producer on the entire production. The overall album reached No. 1 on the Billboard Top Latin Albums and No. 1 on the Billboard Regional Mexican Albums charts. He has worked on other songs by Chiquis, including Billboard's Top 40 Latin Airplay song "Esa No Soy Yo" and Billboard's Top 40 Regional Mexican song "Completamente."

Reyes' most recent work as a songwriter includes his collaboration in the English version of the track "Habla Blah Blah" performed by Gloria Trevi in 2014 and his collaboration with producer Humberto Gatica. Directing Gloria's voice for her 2015 released album "El Amor," that same year Reyes worked as a songwriter on the No. 1 iTunes Brasil Hit Song "Están Ahí," which was recorded by Mexican pop star Anahí in 2015 under Reyes' vocal direction. In 2015 Reyes performed as a solo artist at the BMI Latin music showcase in New York City, along with several other shows.

== Personal life ==
He currently lives in Los Angeles.

== Awards and nominations ==
Year	Award	Nominated work	Category	Result
2013	Premios Texas	Julio Reyes	Newcomer of the Year	Nominated

== Filmography ==
Year	Release title	Type	Notes, role
2014	Pecado Mortal: Historias de Corrido	Feature-length film	Lead role as "Achilles"

== Discography ==
=== Albums ===
Albums by Julio Reyes
Year	Album title	Release details
2012	No Inventes	Released: July 30, 2012; Label: Sony Music Latin; Format: CD, digital download

=== Singles ===
Incomplete list of songs by Julio Reyes
Year	Title	Chart peaks		Album	Release details
Year	Title	Mex	—	Album	Release details
2012	"No Puedo Regresar"	—	—	Single	Self-released (August 2012)
2012	"No Inventes"	40	—	No Inventes	Sony Music Latin (June 18, 2012)
2012	"Recompense"	—	—	No Inventes	Sony Music Latin (June 18, 2012)
2014	"Sin Verguenza"	—	—	Single	Dos Hogares soundtrack
2015	"Me Canse De Rogarte"	—	—	Single	Cosmica Records (May 26, 2015)

=== Guest credits ===
Selected songwriter credits for Julio Reyes
Year	Title	Artist	Chart peaks							Album	Role
Year	Title	Artist	US 100	Latin Air	Mex	Latin Digi	Latin Stream			Album	Role
2015	"Esa No Soy Yo"	Chiquis Rivera	—	33	16	8	—	—	—	Single	Co-writer
2015	"Completamente"	Chiquis Rivera	—	—	31	25	—	—	—	Ahora	Co-writer
2015	"Están Ahí"	Anahí	—	—	—	—	—	—	—	Inesperado	Co-writer
2016	"Boom Cha"	Anahí	—	—	—	—	—	—	—	Inesperado	Co-writer
2016	"Siempre Tú"	Anahí	—	—	—	—	—	—	—	Inesperado	Co-writer
2016	"Dímelo Al Revés"	Gloria Trevi	—	—	—	—	—	—	—	Inmortal (En Vivo)	
2016	"Quítame La Ropa"	Gloria Trevi	—	—	—	—	—	—	—	Inmortal (En Vivo)	
"—" denotes a recording that did not chart or was not released in that territory.

== See also ==
- Music of Mexico
- List of singer-songwriters
