= Aparentemente Bien =

Single by Jenni Rivera

from the album Misión Cumplida
- Language: Spanish
- English title: "Apparently Well"
- Released: July 2, 2019
- Genre: Regional Mexican; banda; mariachi; Latin pop
- Length: 4:17
- Label: Sony Music Latin; Jenni Rivera Enterprises
- Songwriters: Alejandro Lerner; Erika Ender
- Producers: Juan Rivera; Rosie Rivera

Jenni Rivera singles chronology
"La Mentada Contestada" (2016)	"Aparentemente Bien" (2019)	"Engañémoslo" (2020)

Music video
- "Aparentemente Bien" on YouTube

"Aparentemente Bien" (Apparently Good) is a song performed by American singer Jenni Rivera. It was released posthumously as a single by Rivera's estate on her fiftieth birthday, July 2, 2019, through Sony Music Latin. The single included Latin pop and mariachi versions of the song. The song would later be included in the posthumous album Misión Cumplida (2023), as the lead single.

The song was written by "Despacito" co-writers Alejandro Lerner and Erika Ender, while production was done by Juan and Rosie Rivera.

== Background ==
The song, among others, was discovered by Rivera's brother, Juan Rivera, on a hard drive. Rosie Rivera and the rest of her family waited for "the right moment" before releasing the song. In an interview with Billboard, Rosie stated that "[they] weren't sure if the world was ready, if the kids were ready." and felt like "everyone is getting a better place and is ready for her 50th birthday, the golden year."

As part of a Spotify campaign, Rivera's image would be part of a Times Square billboard for the day of the song's release.

== Music video ==
A music video was uploaded to YouTube upon the song's release, which was directed by Marlon Villar and produced by Dinga Haines. The video had 4 million views in the first 24 hours and was the number 1 trending music video on YouTube in Mexico.

== Track listing ==
Digital single

No.	Title	Length
1.	"Aparentemente Bien" (single version)	4:17
2.	"Aparentemente Bien" (pop version)	4:01
3.	"Aparentemente Bien" (mariachi version)	4:25
Total length:		12:44

== Charts ==
Chart performance for "Aparentemente Bien"
Chart (2019)	Peak position
Mexico Airplay (Billboard)	2
US Hot Latin Songs (Billboard)	32
US Latin Airplay (Billboard)	24
US Regional Mexican Airplay (Billboard)	7

== Certifications ==
Certifications for "Aparentemente Bien"
Region	Certification	Certified units/sales
United States (RIAA)	Platinum (Latin)	60,000^{‡}
^{‡} Sales+streaming figures based on certification alone.
