= Johnny Wactor =

American actor (1986–2024)

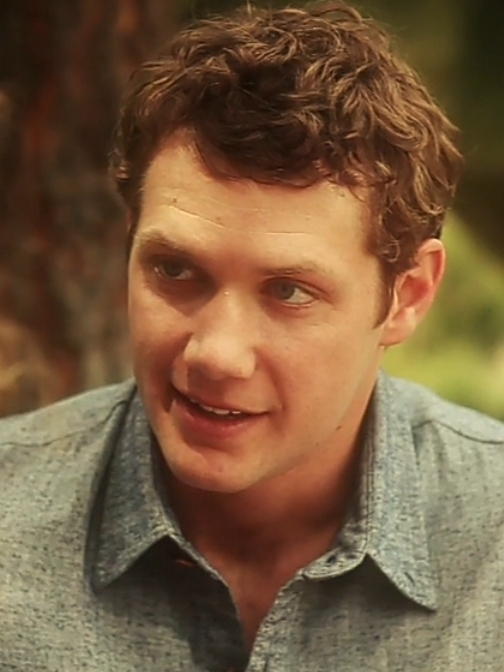
- Wactor in 2012
- Born: John William Wactor III; August 31, 1986; Charleston, South Carolina, U.S.
- Died: May 25, 2024 (aged 37); Los Angeles, California, U.S.
- Cause of death: Gunshot wound
- Education: College of Charleston
- Occupation: Actor
- Years active: 2007–2024
- Notable work: General Hospital; Siberia

John William Wactor III (August 31, 1986 – May 25, 2024) was an American actor known for playing Brando Corbin on the series General Hospital and Johnny on the NBC series Siberia. He also had roles in the series Army Wives and the films USS Indianapolis: Men of Courage and Supercell. On May 25, 2024, Wactor was killed when three men tried to steal his automobile's catalytic converter in downtown Los Angeles. He was 37 years old.

== Early life ==
John William Wactor III was born on August 31, 1986, in Charleston, South Carolina. He had two brothers, Lance and Grant. He grew up in Summerville, South Carolina, where he graduated from Summerville High School in 2004. Wactor then graduated from the College of Charleston with a Bachelor of Science in business administration and a Bachelor of Arts in Spanish in May 2009.

== Career ==
Wactor moved to Los Angeles to work as an actor. He made his television debut with Army Wives in 2007. Wactor played Brando Corbin on the series General Hospital from 2020 to 2022. He also played Johnny on the series Siberia, and had roles in the films USS Indianapolis: Men of Courage, and Supercell. Wactor had a voice role in the video game Call of Duty: Vanguard (2021).

== Personal life ==
Wactor was engaged to actress and director Tessa Farrell, whom he began dating in 2010, but their relationship ended in late 2013.

== Murder ==
After finishing a bartending shift, Wactor was killed on May 25, 2024. He was at the corner of Pico Boulevard and Hope Street in downtown Los Angeles, when he encountered three men who were trying to steal a catalytic converter from his Toyota Prius. Wactor was walking a co-worker to her car when he saw the men, and reportedly initially believed they were towing his car. According to his brother, once Wactor realized what was happening, he shielded his co-worker with his body, and was shot by one of the men attempting to steal the converter.

The three men subsequently fled the scene, and Wactor was taken to a hospital where he was pronounced dead. Wactor's funeral was held at the Summerville Baptist Church in Summerville, South Carolina, on June 16, 2024, three weeks after he was killed.

On August 15, 2024, four men were arrested in connection with Wactor's death. Four days later, prosecutors charged two of the men, associated with a South Central Los Angeles street gang, with murder; the two other men were charged on lesser charges.

== Filmography ==
=== Film ===
Year	Title	Role	Director(s)	Notes
2010	The Grass Is Never Greener	Johnny	Alex Vivian	Short film
2010	Lover's Speed	Johnny	Candace Infuso	Short film
2011	GoldenBox	Tucker	Matt MacDonald	Short film
2011	Snap Judgment	Orderly	Trevor Erickson	
2011	Roundhay Hall	Ethan	Rob Wood	Short film
2011	Synchronicity	Kevin	Monique Thomas	Short film
2012	The Con-Artist	Journalist	Luis F. Pazos	Short film
2012	The Proposal	Bobby	Jason Federici	Short film
2012	Mr. and Mrs. Kill	Eloped Husband	Doc Vidal, Ryan Kibby	Short film: Voice role
2014	Menthol	John	Micah Van Hove	
2014	Ever	John	Josh Beck	
2014	Life, Perfected	Howie	Tyler Seiple	Short film
2015	Flyover States	Mike	Alexander Malt	Short film
2015	A Most Suitable Applicant	Johnny Baker	Krystal White	Short film
2016	The Interrogation	Troy	Michael B. Silver	Short film
2016	USS Indianapolis: Men of Courage	Connor	Mario Van Peebles	
2017	F***, Marry, Kill	Jacob	Scott Donovan	Short film
2018	Cold Soldiers	Orderly	Nick Smith	
2018	Boy Crazy	Troy	Tessa Farrell	Short film
2019	Anything for You, Abby	Tom	Jamin Bricker	Short film
2020	The Relic	Marcus	J.M. Logan	Short film
2022	Broken Riders	Moxin	Robert Benson	Short film
2023	Trapper's Edge	Billy	Johnny Hickey, Jimmy Scanlon	
2023	Supercell	Martin	Herbert James Winterstern	
2024	Dead Talk Tales: Volume 1	Marcus	John Vizaniaris	

=== Television ===
Year	Title	Role	Notes
2007–2009	Army Wives	Airman Byers, PFC Kantor, Soldier	3 episodes
2010–2016	Hollywood Girl	Shane Hudson	8 episodes
2013	Siberia	Johnny	11 episodes
2015	Agent X	John's Father	Episode: "Truth, Lies and Consequences"
2016	Vantastic	Beyanna BamBam	3 episodes
2016	Animal Kingdom	MP #1	Episode: "Man In"
2017	Training Day	Greg	Episode: "Code of Honor"
2017	Criminal Minds	Trey Gordon	Episode: "In the Dark"
2017	Sisters of the Groom	Tim	Television film
2017	Struggling Servers	Actor	Episode: "The Move"
2017–2018	Age Appropriate	Jake	3 episodes
2018	Disillusioned	Jared	Television film
2019	NCIS	Navy Lieutenant Ross Johnson	Episode: "The Last Link"
2019	The OA	EMT 2	Episode: "Angel of Death"
2020	Westworld	Gunny Thompson	2 episodes
2020	The Passenger	Horace Parker	3 episodes
2020–2022	General Hospital	Brando Corbin	164 episodes
2023	Station 19	Lt. Cooper	Episode: "Even Better Than the Real Thing"
2023	Barbee Rehab	Star Trek Ken	7 episodes

=== Video game ===
Year	Title	Role	Notes
2021	Call of Duty: Vanguard	Additional Voice	Voice role
