= Enrique Sapene =

Venezuelan actor

- Born: Enrique Luis Sapene; August 4, 1983 (age 42); Caracas, Venezuela
- Occupations: Actor, producer
- Spouse: Danny Garcia (m. 2014 - 2026)
- Website: http://www.enriquesapene.com/

Enrique Luis Sapene (born August 4, 1983) is a Venezuelan actor and producer based in Los Angeles.

== Personal ==
Enrique Sapene was born in Caracas, Venezuela. He comes from a family with a long lineage in Television which includes Marcel Granier and Eduardo Sapene from Venezuela's RCTV. Enrique Sapene grew up between Venezuela, France and the United States where he now resides.

While in the United States, Enrique attended the Lee Strasberg Theatre and Film Institute for method acting.

== Career ==
In 2008, Enrique participated in a reality show named Viva Hollywood on the VH1 Network hosted by Carlos Ponce and María Conchita Alonso.

On March 16, 2016 WEtv announced the cast of "My Life is a Telenovela" with Enrique as a principal actor along with fellow telenovela stars Sissi Fleitas, Liliana Rodriguez, Maria Raquenel Portillo and Gustavo Pedraza. The show highlighted the lives of telenovela stars, the challenges of casting and the drama usually associated with the famed telenovelas.

Sapne made several appearances in 2016 and 2017 on Rica, Famosa, Latina, for 15 episodes.

In 2022 he produced together with Rubén Consuegra who was the director of "My Life is a Telenovela". A reality show for Canela TV, Secretos de villanas, and in 2023, Secretos de las indomables.

== Filmography ==
Year	Title	Role	Notes
2008	Viva Hollywood	Himself	Contestant; 7° Eliminated
2016	My Life is a Telenovela	Himself	Main cast
2017	Rica	Himself	Recurring cast (season 5)
2022	Secretos de villanas	Himself	Host (season 1)
