= Secretos de villanas =

2022 Mexican reality TV series

- Genre: Reality television
- Created by: Rubén Consuegra; Enrique Sapene
- Directed by: Rubén Consuegra
- Country of origin: Mexico
- Original language: Spanish
- No. of seasons: 3
- No. of episodes: 27

Production
- Executive producers: Rubén Consuegra; Enrique Sapene
- Producers: Javier Talan; Mateo Restrepo; Gachi Ciurluini; Christian Barcellos
- Running time: 45–55 minutes
- Production company: River Waves Productions

Original release
- Network: Canela TV
- Release: October 20, 2022 – December 12, 2024

Related
- Secretos de las indomables

Secretos de villanas (Secrets of Villains) is a Spanish-language reality show co-created by Canela Media and executive producers Rubén Consuegra and Enrique Sapene of River Waves Productions for Canela TV.

== Production ==
The series was first announced in August 2022. It documents six well-known Mexican soap opera actresses during a vacation in Cabo San Lucas. The first part premiered on October 20, 2022, as a 3-episode reunion series, hosted by Enrique Sapane. The second part of the first season premiered a week later under the pseudonym "Las Vacaciones". With the participation of Gabriela Spanic, Cynthia Klitbo, Sabine Moussier, Geraldine Bazán, Aylín Mujica and Sarah Mintz.

In January 2023 Canela TV renewed the show for a second season. On August 11, 2023, the incorporation of Laura Zapata was confirmed. It was filmed in a mansion in Canada and it premiered on October 26, 2023.

In March 2024, the show was renewed for a third season and the addition of Catherine Siachoque was made public. Bazán and Mintz would not return this season. It will be filmed in Marbella, Spain.

== Cast ==
- Géraldine Bazán (season 1–2)
- Sarah Mintz (season 1–2)
- Cynthia Klitbo
- Sabine Moussier
- Aylín Mújica
- Gabriela Spanic
- Laura Zapata (season 2–3)
- Catherine Siachoque (season 3)

== Episodes ==
Season	Episodes		Originally released	
Season	Episodes		First released	Last released
1	12	3	October 20, 2022	November 3, 2022
1	12	9	November 17, 2022	January 12, 2023
2	10		October 26, 2023	December 21, 2023
3	10		October 10, 2024	December 12, 2024

=== Season 1 (2022–23) ===
No. overall	No. in season	Title	Original release date
Part 1: El encuentro
1	1	"Las villanas también lloran"	October 20, 2022
2	2	"Las villanas si tienen madre"	October 27, 2022
3	3	"Villana sólo hay una"	November 3, 2022
Part 2: Las vacaciones
4	4	"Sólo lo que merezco"	November 17, 2022
5	5	"No estás sola"	November 24, 2022
6	6	"Este mundo es de las mujeres"	December 1, 2022
7	7	"No estamos grabando la usurpadora"	December 8, 2022
8	8	"¡Sorpresa!"	December 15, 2022
9	6	"Despiértame cundo terminen"	December 22, 2022
10	10	"Este guion esta para película"	December 29, 2022
11	11	"Villanas y amigas"	January 5, 2023
12	12	"La última cena"	January 12, 2023

=== Season 2 (2023) ===
No. overall	No. in season	Title	Original release date
13	1	"Sorpresas te da la vida"	October 26, 2023
14	2	"Las verdades en la cara"	November 2, 2023
15	3	"Los hijos son sagrados"	November 9, 2023
16	4	"¡Supéralo!"	November 16, 2023
17	5	"¡Qué amistades, cariño!"	November 23, 2023
18	6	"Mi voz es muy importante"	November 30, 2023
19	7	"Vibrando alto"	December 7, 2023
20	8	"La venganza de la Usurpadora"	December 14, 2023
21	6	"¿Cómo durmieron?"	December 21, 2023
22	10	"La vida es complicada"	December 21, 2023

=== Season 3 (2024) ===
No. overall	No. in season	Title	Original release date
23	1	"¡Bienvenida!"	October 10, 2024
24	2	"¡Todas somos villanas!"	October 17, 2024
25	3	"El tesoro escondido"	October 24, 2024
26	4	"¿Bipolares, tripolares o multipolares?"	October 31, 2024
27	5	"Todas somos mujeres"	November 7, 2024
28	6	"¿Quiénes son estos hombres?"	November 14, 2024
29	7	"Día de tregua"	November 21, 2024
30	8	"El siguiente round"	November 28, 2024
31	9	"Vibrar en la misma sintonía"	December 5, 2024
32	10	"La despedida"	December 12, 2024

== Release ==
Secretos de villanas premiered on October 20, 2022, on Canel TV and premieres weekly on Thursdays. The first season consisted of twelve episodes. The second season release occurred in late 2023, following the same release schedule as the first season. The third season premiered on October 10, 2024.

== Reception ==
According to Canela TV, the series has been the most watched series on the streaming service since its launch.

=== Awards and nominations ===
Year	Award	Category	Nominated	Result	Ref
2024	Produ Awards	Best Non-Scripted Program	Secretos de villanas	Nominated	

== Spin-offs ==
Due to the success of the series, a spin-off was ordered in January 2023, titled Secretos de las indomables. On November 7, 2024, it was announced that Canela TV had ordered a third series of the Secretos franchise, titled Secretos de parejas.
