= Secretos de las indomables =

2022 Mexican reality TV series

- Genre: Reality
- Directed by: Rubén Consuegra; Yrack Rodriguez; Raúl Zuazo
- Country of origin: Mexico
- Original language: Spanish
- No. of seasons: 1
- No. of episodes: 10

Production
- Producers: Christian Barcellos; Gachi Ciurluini; Rubén Consuegra; Michael Rafferty; Enrique Sapene; Javier Talan; Mateo Restrepo
- Running time: 47–58 minutes
- Production company: River Waves Productions

Original release
- Network: Canela TV
- Release: August 17 – October 19, 2023

Related
- Secretos de villanas

Secretos de las indomables (transl. "Secrets of the Untameable") is a Mexican reality television series co-created by Ruben Consuegra and River Waves Productions for Canela TV. The series is inspired by Secretos de villanas.

== Production ==
After the success that Canela TV obtained with Secretos de Villanas, becoming the most watched series on the platform, a spin-off was ordered for the second half of 2023.

The series was first announced in January 2023 under the name "Secrets of Protagonists". In May the list of cast members was revealed, this time with the name of the series.

Follows six well-known women from the television industry during a trip to Tulúm, México. Cast members of the first season included Mexican singer Yuri, renowned Miss Universe Alicia Machado and Zuleyka Rivera, television personality Amara La Negra, Ninel Conde, and Patricia Manterola.

== Cast ==
- Alicia Machado
- Amara La Negra
- Ninel Conde
- Patricia Manterola
- Yuri
- Zuleyka Rivera

== Episodes ==
No.	Title	Original release date
1	"Va a estallar la guerra"	August 17, 2023
2	"¡Va a fluir la sangre!"	August 24, 2023
3	"El dolor de una madre"	August 31, 2023
4	"¿Amigas o enemigas?"	September 7, 2023
5	"Me voy de este infierno"	September 14, 2023
6	"La carne es débil"	September 21, 2023
7	"¡Que se lo coman!"	September 28, 2023
8	"Con cuidadito, Leo"	October 5, 2023
9	"¿Cómo va a acabar esta vaina?"	October 12, 2023
10	"Hermanas para siempre"	October 19, 2023

== Release ==
Secretos de las indomables premiered on August 17, 2023, on Canela TV and premieres weekly on Thursdays. For the first season, 10 episodes were ordered.
