= Misión Cumplida =

2023 studio album by Jenni Rivera

Studio album by Jenni Rivera
- Released: June 30, 2023
- Genres: Regional Mexican; banda; mariachi
- Length: 46:19
- Label: Sony Latin
- Producers: Sergio Lizárraga, Pavel Ocampo

Jenni Rivera chronology
| Mariposa de Barrio (Soundtrack De La Serie) (2021) | Misión Cumplida (2023) |

Singles from Misión Cumplida
- 1. "Aparentemente Bien" Released: July 2, 2019; 2. "Engañémoslo" Released: February 28, 2020; 3. "Quisieran Tener Mi Lugar" Released: July 2, 2020; 4. "Motivos" Released: March 19, 2021; 5. "Misión Cumplida" Released: November 2, 2022; 6. "Pedacito de Mí" Released: June 30, 2023

Misión Cumplida (English: Mission Accomplished) is the 13th studio album by Mexican-American singer Jenni Rivera. It was released posthumously by Sony Music Latin on June 30, 2023. It is Rivera's first full-length release in eleven years since Joyas Prestadas (2011) and consists of old recordings that were stored in a hard drive for a long period of time, which were remastered upon release. The album also features vocal appearances by Chiquis and Jacqie Rivera, as well as an instrumental appearance by Banda Los Reyes, with most of the album's production done by Sergio Lizárraga and Pavel Ocampo of Banda MS.

To promote the album, five singles were released; "Aparentemente Bien" was released in 2019, "Engañémoslo" and "Quisieran Tener Mi Lugar" in 2020, "Motivos" in 2021, and its title track "Misión Cumplida" in 2022. The former single peaked at number 34 on the US Hot Latin Songs and number seven on the US Regional Mexican Airplay charts, making this Rivera's first song chartings since 2014. The album was certified Gold in the Latin field by the Recording Industry Association of America (RIAA), selling over 30 thousand copies in the United States.

Four of the 16 songs on Misión Cumplida, which range from banda music to mariachi, are covers of songs and compositions: "El Que Hoy Está en Tu Lugar", "Hablando Claro", "Que Me Entierren Cantando", and "Motivos"; the first two are originally performed by Chayito Valdez, the third being originally performed by Ramón Ayala, and the latter song was originally written by Aniano Alcalde Zorzano and José Domingo Castaño Solar. Another four songs off the album are single or alternate versions of other songs on the album.

== Background and recording ==
On December 9, 2012, Jenni Rivera and five other passengers died in a plane crash en route to the city of Toluca. Posthumous compilation and live albums have been released since then. In 2016, Johnny Lopez, who is Jenni's youngest child, found handwritten lyrics to a song titled "Misión Cumplida", that were originally written by Jenni in 2008, and kept them for a long time. He also had a goal to find Jenni's old recordings that were stored in her hard drive, which ended up being found. Among the songs in the hard drive, covers of songs by Chayito Valdez, Lucha Villa, and Ramón Ayala and an unfinished recording of "Pedacito de Mí" were found. The song was originally recorded when Jenni was pregnant with Johnny, and he recalled that he originally heard the song when her oldest sister, Chiquis Rivera, sang it in 2015, in an event for Jenni's birthday.

Chiquis, along with her sister Jacqie Rivera, who is the acting CEO of Jenni Rivera Fashion, had recorded additional vocals for the unfinished recording. All of Rivera's five children, Chiquis, Jacqie, Michael, Jenicka, and Johnny, had been working on the album. Johnny said, "What my mom loved was la banda sinaloense and Sergio [Lizárraga] is a master at that" and wanted to "make sure Jenni's songs sound like [banda] before she left [them]." Misión Cumplida was later announced on Jenni's official Instagram account, which is managed by her estate, on May 30, 2023.

== Music and lyrics ==
Produced by Sergio Lizárraga and Pavel Ocampo, Mision Cumplida is a regional Mexican album, with the inclusion of banda and mariachi tracks. The album begins with a spoken word introduction track, which is a speech by Jenni recorded during a past live performance, before transitioning into "Q.T.M.L. (El Corrido de la Diva)".

== Release and promotion ==
To promote Misión Cumplida, "Aparentemente Bien" would be released on July 2, 2019, as its lead single. It reached its peak position at number 32 on the Billboard Hot Latin Songs chart and number seven on Regional Mexican Airplay. A music video was released on the same day. "Engañémoslo" was released on February 28, 2020, as the album's second single. Further, "Quisieran Tener Mi Lugar" was released on July 2, 2020, as the album's third single, along with its accompanying music video. "Motivos" was released on March 19, 2021, along with an accompanying animation, as the album's fourth single. "Misión Cumplida", the album's title track, was released on November 2, 2022, as its fifth single.

In September 2022, the album was announced. The album was released for digital download, streaming and as a CD, on June 30, 2023, through Sony Music Latin. Along with the album's release, "Pedacito de Mí" and its music video were released on the same day as its sixth single. It was also announced that the album would be released as vinyl record on November 17, 2023. Johnny Lopez and Jacquie Rivera also promoted the album in Mexico City in August 2023, as well as in Monterrey. In October 2023, Misión Cumplida was certified Gold in the Latin field by the Recording Industry Association of America (RIAA), for selling over 30 thousand copies in the United States.

== Track listing ==
Misión Cumplida track listing
| No. | Title | Writer(s) | Length |
|---|---|---|---|
| 1. | "Intro" | Janney Dolores Rivera | 0:42 |
| 2. | "Q.T.M.L (El Corrido de la Diva)" | Rivera, Luis Antonio López Flores | 3:09 |
| 3. | "Engañémoslo" | Espinoza Paz | 3:26 |
| 4. | "El Que Hoy Está en Tu Lugar" | Teodoro Bello Benitez | 2:34 |
| 5. | "Hablando Claro" | Manuel Aguilar Dávila | 2:07 |
| 6. | "Que Me Entierren Cantando" | Oscar Hernandez Cedillo | 3:49 |
| 7. | "Motivos" | Aniano Alcalde Zorzano, José Domingo Castaño Solar | 3:01 |
| 8. | "Aparentemente Bien" | Alejandro Lerner, Erika Ender | 4:17 |
| 9. | "Pedacito de Mí (Interludio)" | Rivera, Yaredt Leon | 1:15 |
| 10. | "Legado (Reflexión)" | Rivera | 1:19 |
| 11. | "Pedacito de Mí" (with Chiquis Rivera and Jacqie Rivera) | Rivera, Leon | 3:30 |
| 12. | "Misión Cumplida" | Rivera | 3:10 |
| 13. | "Quisieran Tener Mi Lugar" (single version) | Rivera, Lopez Flores | 2:57 |
| 14. | "Engañémoslo" (with Mariachi Los Reyes; mariachi version, single version) | Paz | 3:31 |
| 15. | "Motivos" (single version) | Alcalde Zorzano, Castaño Solar | 3:08 |
| 16. | "Aparentemente Bien" (single version) | Erika Ender, Alejandro Lerner | 4:17 |
| Total length: | | | 46:19 |

== Personnel ==
Credits adapted from the liner notes of Misión Cumplida.

Production

- Sergio Lizárraga, Pavel Ocampo – production
- Honorio Emmanuel Sillas Lara – recording (tracks 2–8)
- Luis Humberto López López – recording, mastering, mixing (tracks 2–8)
- Guadalupe Cruz – A&R coordinator (tracks 2–8 and 12)
- Manuel Prado – A&R director (tracks 2–8, 12)

Additional musicians

- Jesús Daniel López López – accordion (tracks 2–8)
- Pavel Josue Ocampo Quintero – clarinet (tracks 2–8)
- Heleodoro Delgadillo – guitar (track 9)
- Abel Campos, César Aguilar, Diego Arrellano, Hector Gallegos – guitar (track 14)
- José Javier Osuna Samano – saxophone (tracks 2–8)
- Marcos Omar Medrano Acosta – trombone (tracks 2–8)
- Saul Medina Carrillo – trumpet (tracks 2–8)
- Iván López Montoya – tuba (tracks 2–8)

== Certifications ==
| Region | Certification | Certified units/sales |
|---|---|---|
| United States (RIAA) | Gold (Latin) | 30,000^{‡} |
^{‡} Sales+streaming figures based on certification alone.

== Release history ==
Release dates and formats for Misión Cumplida
| Region | Date | Label(s) | Format(s) | Ref. |
|---|---|---|---|---|
| United States | June 30, 2023 | Sony Latin | CD; digital download; streaming | |
| United States | November 17, 2023 | Sony Latin | Vinyl | |
