= I Love Jenni =

- Genre: Reality
- Starring: Jenni Rivera; Janney 'Chiquis' Marin; Jacqie Campos; Michael 'Trinidad' Marin; Esteban Loaiza; Rosie Rivera; Juan Angel Lopez; Jenicka Lopez; Jaylah Hope Yanez
- Theme music composer: Down AKA Kilo
- Opening theme: "I Love Jenni"
- Country of origin: United States
- No. of seasons: 3
- No. of episodes: 49

Production
- Executive producers: Jenni Rivera; Edward Paige; Shari Scorca; Liane Su; Pete Salgado
- Running time: 40 to 43 minutes
- Production company: Blank Paige Productions

Original release
- Network: mun2
- Release: March 5, 2011 – August 11, 2013

Related
- Jenni Rivera Presents: Chiquis & Raq-C; Chiquis n' Control; The Riveras

I Love Jenni is an American reality television series that debuted on mun2 on March 5, 2011. and concluded on August 11, 2013. I Love Jenni documents the personal and professional life of Mexican-American singer Jenni Rivera and those close to her.

Season 3 of I Love Jenni acquired enough viewers to make it the most-watched mun2 original program in the network's history. It finished as the fifth-most-watched program with Hispanic females 18–49 and seventh-most-watched series with Hispanic adults 18–49.

== Production ==
The first two seasons revolve around Jenni's family and their personal lives in Encino, Los Angeles, and Jenni's life as a recording artist. Jenni announced on Twitter in November 2012 that filming of the third season had begun. On December 9, 2012, Rivera died in a plane crash after a sold-out performance in Arena Monterrey. The production team of the show had been traveling with her and filmed her entire last concert. It was confirmed in January 2013 that the third season would continue and that it would feature footage of Rivera in the month prior to her death and the family would continue filming the rest of the third season which will encompass them as they move on from Jenni's death. Rivera's children Chiquis, Jacqie, Michael, Jenicka and Johnny, are featured, as well as her sister, Rosie Rivera. The third and final season debuted on April 14, 2013.

== Cast ==
=== Main ===
- Jenni Rivera (Season 1 - 2) (first 6 episodes of Season 3), Regional Mexican singer and main protagonist and namesake of the series. She has 5 children and 2 grandchildren during the show. She is fully featured in the first 2 season but only appears in the first 6 episodes of the final season due to her untimely death occurring during filming of season 3.
- Janney ‘Chiquis’ Marin (Season 1 - 3) Jenni’s eldest daughter. Born in 1985, she was always considered the second mother to her younger siblings. In between season 2 and 3, she and Jenni became estranged 2 months before her death due to rumors of an affair between her and Esteban Loaiza, Jenni’s Husband. After her death Marin returned to the family to be with her siblings in their time of grief.
- Jacquelin ‘Jacqui’ Marin-Campos (Season 1 - 3) Jenni’s second oldest daughter. Born in 1989, she has a daughter Jaylah who was born prior to the show. In season 2 she starts dating and is later engaged to Mike Campos, whom she would later marry in between season 2 & 3.
- Michael ‘Mikey’ Marin (Season 1 - 3) Jenni’s eldest son and 3rd eldest child. Born in 1991, he has a passion for graffiti art and would later on in the show paint a mural outside of his uncles barber shop in honor of his mother. In between seasons 2 & 3 him and his girlfriend Drea gave birth to their baby Luna.
- Jenicka Lopez (Season 1 - 3) Jenni’s youngest daughter, the first of children Jenni would have with her second husband Juan Lopez in 1997.
- Juan Angel ‘Johnny’ Lopez (Season 1 - 3) Jenni’s youngest son and the youngest of the family. Born in 2001, he was named after his father Juan Lopez
- Jaylah Hope Yanez (Season 1 - 3) Jacqui’s first daughter & Jenni’s first grandchild born in 2009.
- Rosie Rivera (Season 3) Jenni’s younger sister, she regularly appeared on her sisters radio show “Contacto Directo con Jenni Rivera”. Just before her Jenni’s passing she moved into her home along with her husband Abel Flores.
- Esteban Loaiza (Season 1-2) MLB pitcher and Jenni’s third husband. He was no longer in the show after Jenni filed for divorce from Loaiza in October 2012 due to the rumors of an affair between him and Jenni’s daughter Chiquis.

=== Recurring ===
- Pete Salgado
- Juan Rivera
- Rosa Saavedra
- Gerald Gamble
- Drea Ibarra
- Luna Amira Marin
- Julie Vasquez

== Episodes ==
=== Season 1 (2011) ===
No. overall	No. in season	Title	Original release date
1	1	"Growing Up Rivera"	March 5, 2011
The diva is going to Hollywood! Jenni Rivera lands a movie role with Edward James Olmos and goes to an acting coach to prepare. Chiquis moves out of the home office and into her own office space. The business is growing up and so is she. Jenni throws Jacqui a big bash to celebrate her 21st birthday — and things get wild!
2	2	"Love & Tacos"	March 12, 2011
Jenni makes tacos for the family and is inspired to start a new business, so she and Esteban hunt for the perfect taco truck. Chiquis gets hit with a very expensive noise citation from Jacqui's party and decides to fight the ticket in court. Jacqui volunteers at Gentle Barn, an organization that helps abused and neglected animals, and she brings Johnny and Chiquis along to help out.
3	3	"Back to Her Roots"	March 19, 2011
Jenni takes the kids to visit her hometown roots, Jacqui sneaks off to get a tattoo and Chiquis thinks about moving out on her own.
4	4	"Mi Corazon"	March 26, 2011
Love is in the air. Jenni and Esteban go on a date – to the shooting range. Chiquis and Jacqui throw a "lonely hearts" party for all their single friends. Everyone gets tipsy and a little wild. Someone even gets naked!
5	5	"Takes Hollywood"	April 9, 2011
Jenni and Chiquis get glamorous for a Latina magazine cover shoot. Jenni heads to the set of her new movie and prepares for her role as a mother behind bars.
6	6	"Dollars and Sense"	April 16, 2011
Vegas Baby! Jenni Rivera and Esteban Loaiza head to Sin City and discover Fernando Vargas’ hidden talent. Chiquis attempts to live on a budget, and La Diva stops by AMP Radio to chat with Carson Daly.
7	7	"Keeping Abreast of the Situation"	April 23, 2011
Like a true diva, Jenni Rivera is fashionably late, even to court. Chiquis wants a body makeover, but can she handle the pain? Things get serious when Jenni makes a heart-wrenching announcement.
8	8	"Johnny Be Good"	April 30, 2011
It's Johnny's birthday and a good excuse for Jenni Rivera to throw another bash. Uncle Juan lends a hand with the family pet, while Gerardo Ortíz serenades a star struck Jacqui.
9	9	"Viva La Diva"	May 7, 2011
Jenni Rivera channels her inner stripper when she and the girls take pole-dancing lessons. Jacqui gets hypnotized into losing weight and La Diva hits West Hollywood to meet her drag queen impersonator.
10	10	"Facing the Music"	May 21, 2011
Michael is the center of a scandalous trial and the entire Rivera clan is standing by his side. Jenni Rivera has a diva moment at one of her concerts and her fans show her the true meaning of loyalty.
11	11	"Gotta Have Faith"	May 28, 2011
It’s puppy love in the Jenni Rivera household when Michael helps his dog find a mate. Rosie tries on wedding dresses and all of her girls come out for support. La Diva gives back to the community when she brings Rivera flair to a women’s shelter.
12	12	"Hard Lunch, Soft Shell"	June 6, 2011
La Gran Señora terrorizes the streets of Los Angeles in her mission to deliver delicious Jenni tacos to her fans. Michael finds an outlet for his troubles with the help of Chino XL and music. The Rivera family gathers for a birthday barbecue and emotional confessions.
13	13	"Rivera Rewind"	June 13, 2011
On the season finale of I Love Jenni, Las chicas Rivera take a look back at all of their favorite moments from the last season.

=== Season 2 (2012) ===
No. overall	No. in season	Title	Original release date
14	1	"Drop It Like It's Hot"	March 3, 2012
Jenni Rivera is back for a new season starting with the release of her latest album. Just as Jenni is about to have some of the biggest moments of her career to date, a health scare threatens to stop her in her tracks.
15	2	"A Rivera Thanksgiving"	March 10, 2012
While in the holiday spirit, Chiquis organizes a charity turkey giveaway and decides to move the location of the Rivera Thanksgiving dinner. Jenni hosts an event for fans where they can buy a replica of her famous engagement ring. Esteban faces a tough decision about his baseball career in the wake of Jenni’s health issues.
16	3	"Christmas Wishes"	March 17, 2012
Jenni reveals to the family that she will be having surgery, but they still try to rally for a festive Christmas. Jacqui and Chiquis visit sick kids for Christmas at the Children’s Hospital of Los Angeles. Jenni breaks down as she faces the dreaded surgery in Tijuana.
17	4	"The Cup Is Half Full"	March 24, 2012
Jenni is fully recovered from her own scary surgery, but now she has to take care of Chiquis and Elena after their breast reductions. Plus, her assistant Julie is having a breast augmentation. Jenni ends up playing nurse to a house full of aching women!
18	5	"Jenni Rivera and the Sundance Kids"	March 31, 2012
Jenni Rivera’s first film, Filly Brown, has been chosen to screen at the Sundance Film Festival, so Jenni is off to Park City, Utah with her family in tow. While Jenni does press with co-stars Lou Diamond Phillips, Gina Rodriguez and producer Edward James Olmos, the kids and Esteban take advantage of the winter weather and try skiing. When Jenni finally makes it out to do some snow tubing, a blizzard hits and they are forced to take cover.
19	6	"Boss B"	April 7, 2012
Chiquis presents Jenni Rivera with a business plan for a "blow dry bar." Jenni likes the idea but is not so keen on the proposed name. Jenni starts to work as a judge on a talent competition and meets some of her biggest fans. Jacqui and her boyfriend, Michael, invite Jenni over for dinner at his house in Compton, where she digs into Michael as only Jenni Rivera can!
20	7	"Road to Pechanga"	April 14, 2012
Jenni Rivera does full-court press the day of her big concert at Pechanga Casino starting with a fun morning on a local news show. The day’s mood changes when she gets a caller on her radio show who is a victim of sexual abuse. Chiquis makes big plans for her salon, but runs into some trouble with her landlord. Later, the entire family heads out to Jenni Rivera’s Pechanga show.
21	8	"My Heart Will Go On"	April 22, 2012
Jenni Rivera and the family are convinced that their house is haunted and they call medium AJ Barrera in to figure out who is living in their house and what they are trying to tell the family.
22	9	"Cupid's Arrow"	April 29, 2012
Jacqui's boyfriend Michael asks Jenni Rivera's permission for her daughter's hand in marriage. Chiquis on the other hand is not so lucky in love. Jenni Rivera interviews Chris Perez on her radio show about his love and marriage with deceased singer Selena.
23	10	"How To Win and Influence 11 Year Olds"	May 6, 2012
Jenni Rivera interviews Cheech Marin on her radio show. Johnny starts acting out, so Jenni takes him to a therapist to learn how to make friends and deal with anger. Chiquis is working on the build out for her salon and learns that it's more complicated than she thought.
24	11	"Home Alone"	May 13, 2012
While Jenni Rivera is away on the road in Mexico, Chiquis and the kids must fend for themselves at home.
25	12	"The Cut"	May 20, 2012
Jenni Rivera multitasks with radio and TV appearances and gets into a fight with both her radio co-host and her assistant, Julie. The kids lose Dirty the dog and have to hike in the hills near Jenni’s house to find him. Juan Rivera has a grand opening for his barber shop, and Jenni Rivera and her brothers show up to support.
26	13	"Tu Tu Tengo"	June 3, 2012
There's big news for everyone in the family. Jenni Rivera informs Juan that she is selling the house in Corona, California where he is currently living. Juan challenges Jenni to a paintball game to stay in the house a little longer. Jenni Rivera finds out that she will be an abuela for a second time!
27	14	"Of Mice and Mexicans"	June 10, 2012
Jenni Rivera decides it’s time for some home improvements. She lays down the law over Mikey’s dog, Dirty, but a mouse in the house makes Jenni reconsider.
28	15	"From 'Buela to Jaylah"	June 17, 2012
Jacqui discovers that Jenni Rivera is teaching her daughter Jaylah a little more about being a diva than she’s comfortable with. Chiquis is busy getting her shop open and does the first round of staff interviews. Jenni Rivera is serious about getting in shape and has a boxing workout with her friend, boxer Fernando Vargas.
29	16	"Bienvenidos a Miami"	June 24, 2012
Jenni Rivera takes on Miami and the Billboard Latin Music Awards, where she juggles rehearsals, performances, a keynote speech at the Billboard Latin Music Conference as well as some alone time with husband Esteban. A last-minute decision by Jenni Rivera to walk the red carpet sets the team into crisis mode.
30	17	"On Blast"	June 30, 2012
Jenni Rivera is confronted by Diablito about her work ethic at the radio station. Chiquis learns the basics of a good blow dry. Jenni Rivera and her husband, Esteban, take dance lessons.
31	18	"Aloha Rivera: Part 1"	July 8, 2012
Jenni Rivera announces to her family that it's time for a family vacation to Hawaii. Chiquis and Jacqui get ready for the trip with some anti-gravity yoga and spray tanning. The Riveras make it to Hawaii and start their adventure-filled trip with snorkeling in the open sea. To be continued...
32	19	"Aloha Rivera: Part 2"	July 15, 2012
Jenni Rivera and family swim with dolphins, hike through a rainforest, learn to surf and go to a traditional Hawaiian Luau! The kids make a bet to see if they can get Jenni in the water to surf. Of course, La Diva doesn’t disappoint!

=== Season 3 (2013) ===
No. overall	No. in season	Title	Original release date
33	-	"We Love Jenni"	April 7, 2013
The special includes interviews with members of her family, and celebrities like Thalia, Snoop Lion, Diana Reyes, Tucanes de Tijuana, Horoscopos de Durango, Larry Hernandez, Carson Daly, Mario Lopez and others.
34	1	"Top of Her Game"	April 14, 2013
Jenni Rivera is newly single and ready to take on the world. After making an appearance on the radio to discuss her divorce, Jenni arrives to the Premios de la Radio, where she takes home five awards. Jenni also does her duty as a mom and checks in on daughter Jacqui, who is now living with her husband and daughter.
35	2	"Birthdays"	April 21, 2013
While on the radio, Jenni gets some big news from her sister Rosie. Rosie and Abel move into Jenni’s house. Jacqui celebrates her first birthday in her new home with her husband and gets an emotional call from Chiquis.
36	3	"Thanksgiving"	April 28, 2013
It's Thanksgiving day and Jenni and the kids have a plan: they're plotting to take food from every house they visit and pass off as Jenni’s cooking! Jenni’s sister Rosie, who decides to visit alternative birthing centers, hears her baby’s heartbeat for the first time. Jenni meets with an artist she is mentoring and hoping to launch into the world of music.
37	4	"Ghosts of Christmas Past"	May 5, 2013
Will Jenni Rivera be in the holiday spirit or is she in need of an intervention?
38	5	"Mariposa, Part 1"	May 12, 2013
Jenni Rivera two surprises guest at her radio show: her father, Don Pedro joins Jenni in the studio and later, Lupillo calls in! Jenni prepares for the big concert in Monterrey by rehearsing with her Norteño band in Los Angeles. Jenni arrives to Monterrey ready to take the stage. To be continued...
39	6	"Mariposa, Part 2"	May 19, 2013
Jenni takes the stage in Monterrey where she gives an amazing performance. The tragedy occurs and the family tells their heart-wrenching stories of December 9.
40	7	"The Road Home"	June 2, 2013
The Rivera family as they attempt to cope and move forward after losing their beloved mother, sister, and daughter. Rosie gathers Jenni’s children to praise them for their strength during these difficult times and together they celebrate the return of Chiquis to the Rivera home to help raise and care for the children.
41	8	"Great Expectations"	June 9, 2013
The family is figuring out their next ventures in their own lives. Rosie debates recording an album and being on Jenni's tribute album, Jacqui and Mikey work on the t-shirt line and Chiquis has spray tanning classes at her salon.
42	9	"True Colors"	June 16, 2013
Mikey decides to do a mural dedicated to his mother, he just needs to figure out where to do it. Rosie, Chiquis and the family work on an exhibit for the Grammy Museum in honor of Jenni. Mikey assembles his team and works on the mural and unveils it to everyone.
43	10	"Battle of the Bulge"	June 23, 2013
A family game night sets off a weight loss challenge between Chiquis and Juan over who can lose 20 lbs first.
44	11	"Yours, Mine and Our Valentines"	June 30, 2013
Rosie and Abel try to make time for romance before the baby is born – but they keep getting interrupted.
45	12	"For the Record"	July 14, 2013
After listening to Jenni’s new English-language recordings, Jacqui is inspired to start working on her own album. Rosie and Abel decide to take baby care classes.
46	13	"Riveras Take Miami, Part 1"	July 21, 2013
The family arrives in Miami for the annual Premios Billboard to honor Jenni Rivera and accept her awards. They use their time together in Miami for family bonding with a tourist trip around Miami Beach, a mani/pedi with Tio Juan, and a dinner with a special toast to Jenni.
47	14	"Riveras Take Miami, Part 2"	July 28, 2013
The family also attends the rehearsals for Juan’s big performance.
48	15	"Mother's Day"	August 4, 2013
The family heads out to the official “Filly Brown” premiere. Jacqui and Mikey meets with a casting agent about working with Jaylah and Luna. The family does a taste test of the Jenni Tequila line. The family celebrates Mother’s Day at the unveiling of the Grammy Museum exhibit for Jenni.
49	16	"Life is But a Dream"	August 11, 2013
On the series finale, Chiquis, Jacqui, Mikey, Jenicka and Johnny take their annual family vacation for the first time without Jenni to the Grand Canyon. They do river rafting, horse back riding and sightseeing in the Canyon, but the most important thing is that they do it together. The kids get to bond and end the series with a laughter and tear-filled campfire.

== Spin-offs ==
=== Chiquis 'N Control ===
The success of I Love Jenni led to the announcement of Jenni Rivera Presents: Chiquis 'N Control, a spin-off starring Rivera's firstborn daughter, Chiquis, as she moves out of her mother's house and opens a blow-dry salon. Chiquis 'N Control premiered on July 28, 2012, on Universo and aired through the summer. It was the only program to outperform I Love Jenni before it returned in April 2013 for its third and final season.

=== The Riveras ===
In May 2016, Universo announced a reality show titled The Riveras, featuring Jenni's five children. The Riveras focuses on Rivera's children, Chiquis, Jacqie, Michael, Jenicka, and Juan Angel as they begin to pursue their dreams and continue to honor their mother's legacy. The Riveras premiered on October 16, 2016, on Universo.
