= Siberia (TV series) =

- Genre: Drama; Science fiction; Horror
- Created by: Matthew Arnold
- Directed by: Matthew Arnold; Herbert James Winterstern; Slava N. Jakovleff
- Starring: Joyce Giraud; Johnny Wactor; Esther Anderson; Miljan Milosevic; Daniel David Sutton; Neeko O.J. Skervin; Irene Yee; Sam Dobbins; Sabina Akhmedova; Natalie Ann Scheetz; Anne-Marie Mueschke; Victoria Hill; George Dickson; Thomas Mountain; Berglind Icey; Harpreet Turka; Jonathon Buckley
- Country of origin: United States
- Original language: English
- No. of seasons: 1
- No. of episodes: 11

Production
- Executive producers: Michael Ohoven; Joyce Giraud (as Joyce De Ohoven); Chris Philip; Slava N. Jakovleff; Doug McCallie; Matthew Arnold; Odin Shafer (Episodes 1–6)
- Production locations: Manitoba, Canada
- Running time: 41–42 minutes
- Production companies: Sierra-Engine Television; Infinity Films; Welldone Productions

Original release
- Network: NBC
- Release: July 1 – September 16, 2013

Siberia is an American supernatural drama television series shot in the style of a reality television show where 16 contestants must survive in the Siberian territory of Tunguska. Shortly after arrival, the contestants notice strange things and are abandoned by the production of the reality show. The show was filmed in Birds Hill Provincial Park just north of Winnipeg, Manitoba, Canada. It premiered on NBC on July 1, 2013.

It was met with generally favorable reviews from critics and viewers, with average viewership per episode coming in around 2.03 million viewers. The first season concluded on September 16, 2013. The show was independently financed and only licensed to NBC, and therefore was never officially cancelled. The producers were, at one point, in talks to renew the series either on NBC or another platform. Siberia was re-aired on June 25, 2020 on Tubi.

== Premise ==
Sixteen reality-show contestants, each hoping to win $500,000, arrive in a Siberian forest to take part in a reality show. Two are immediately eliminated, and fourteen settle in for the contest. The unexpected death of a fellow contestant throws them off, but they eventually all accept it as an accident. Strange events continue to happen, and when a contestant is injured and no help arrives, they realize they will have to band together to survive in a land they do not understand. More unusual events happen that parallel the ones natives experienced 100 years earlier during the Tunguska event.

The show is described as having a "Lost-meets-Survivor premise", and is compared to The Blair Witch Project and The River.

== Cast ==
- Joyce Giraud as Joyce, an actress hired to play the role of Carolina, a bartender from Bogotá, Colombia
- Johnny Wactor as Johnny, a competitive bull rider from Jedburg, South Carolina
- Esther Anderson as Esther, a model from Melbourne, Australia
- Miljan Milosevic as Miljan, a club DJ from Podgorica, Montenegro
- Daniel David Sutton as Daniel, a computer programmer from Royalton, Minnesota
- Neeko O.J. Skervin as Neeko, a professional rugby player from London, United Kingdom
- Irene Yee as Irene, a fashion designer from Taipei, Taiwan
- Sam Dobbins as Sam, a bouncer from Brooklyn, New York
- Sabina Akhmedova as Sabina, a retired soldier from Haifa, Israel
- Natalie Ann Scheetz as Natalie, a veterinary assistant from Santa Barbara, California
- Anne-Marie Mueschke as Annie, a graphic artist from New Orleans, Louisiana
- Victoria Hill as Victoria, a sales clerk from Winnipeg, Canada
- George Dickson as George, an accountant from Louisville, Kentucky
- Thomas Mountain as Tommy, an environmental activist from Boston, Massachusetts
- Berglind Icey as Berglind, a journalist from Reykjavík, Iceland
- Harpreet Turka as Harpreet, a graduate student from Washington, D.C.
- Jonathon Buckley as Jonathon, the host

== Episodes ==
No.	Title	Directed by	Written by	Original release date	U.S. viewers (millions)
1	"Pilot"	Matthew Arnold	Matthew Arnold	July 1, 2013	3.07
In the series premiere, 16 contestants from all around the world arrive in the remote Siberian wilderness where they must try to survive and be the last ones remaining in a show that has no rules and offers no help from the producers, in order to win $500,000. The last two contestants to arrive at the camp where they will be staying will be eliminated from the competition (these turn out to be Harpreet and Berglind). At night, the remaining 14 contestants hear a strange noise in the forest. In the morning, Tommy wanders away searching for mushrooms for food. Later, the contestants are informed by Jonathon, the host, that Tommy has had a fatal accident.
2	"A Question of Reality"	Matthew Arnold	Travis Rooks	July 8, 2013	2.60
George decides to leave the competition. Later, Daniel finds the site where Tommy was killed along with a strange footprint and cave markings showing tribesmen fighting a large creature with the same footprint. The contestants then find a shed full of food, which they decide to ration. Victoria unintentionally eats uncooked poisonous mushrooms and begins hallucinating. The next day, she returns to normal and decides to leave. Before she does, she warns Daniel that in her hallucinations she saw that the group is going to die.
3	"Lyin' and Tiger and Bare"	Matthew Arnold	Odin Shafer and Andrew Adair	July 15, 2013	2.36
At night, the group finds the food shed set ablaze. In the morning, Natalie and Annie return to camp claiming to have seen a tiger. The contestants discover that Johnny burned the food shed, but a hidden camera inside the shed reveals Carolina as the true saboteur, who framed Johnny. Later, Neeko and Sabina find a partially eaten tiger and wonder what could have killed it.
4	"Fire in the Sky"	Matthew Arnold	Dorian Hess	July 29, 2013 (Note: This episode was originally scheduled to air on July 22, 2013, but was preempted by a special edition of Dateline NBC about the birth of Prince George of Cambridge.)	1.93
In the morning, the contestants find a spear in their camp with an attached message warning them to leave. At night, the sky mysteriously turns green. After the sky returns to normal, Carolina reveals to the group that she is a TV actress named Joyce who was ordered by the producers to frame Johnny for burning the food shed.
5	"What She Said"	Matthew Arnold	David Paster	August 5, 2013 (Note: This episode was originally scheduled to air on July 29, 2013, but was replaced by "Fire in the Sky", which was postponed from the previous Monday.)	1.80
Natalie leaves behind a note informing the contestants that she has left the competition. Later, Irene gets caught in a booby trap, severely injuring her leg. Desperate, the contestants search for the producers' basecamp to get help for Irene, but they find the basecamp in ruins.
6	"Out of the Frying Pan"	Matthew Arnold	Matthew Arnold and Odin Shafer	August 12, 2013 (Note: This episode was originally scheduled to air on August 5, 2013, but was replaced by "What She Said", which was postponed from the previous Monday.)	1.86
Now on their own, the contestants discover that Miljan found a century-old Russian diary that describes violent creatures called “Valleymen” and a nomadic tribe called the Evenki. Later, the contestants spot a radio tower in the distance that Johnny, Daniel, Sam, and Joyce hike towards while the rest stay at camp. Along the way, the hikers find a site reminiscent of the Tunguska event.
7	"First Snow"	Slava N. Jakovleff and Herbert James Winterstern	Matthew Arnold and Shaun Hudson	August 19, 2013	1.83
With temperatures dropping, the away team continues their harsh trek. Back at camp, a deranged Miljan attacks Irene, forcing the group to tie him down. Miljan persuades Esther to untie him and to dose the others with sleeping pills so he can secretly take Irene into the woods.
8	"A Gathering Fog"	Slava N. Jakovleff and Herbert James Winterstern	Brian Rost	August 26, 2013	1.73
While the group at camp searches for Irene and Miljan, they stumble upon Natalie's corpse. As Neeko and Sabina press on, Annie and Esther stay behind to bury Natalie but are later captured by unseen forces. Meanwhile, the away team loses sight of the radio tower but instead finds shelter in a deserted Russian research station.
9	"One by One"	Slava N. Jakovleff and Herbert James Winterstern	Matthew Arnold and Brian Rost	September 2, 2013	1.73
At the research station, the away team discovers a lab conducting mutation experiments and find the radio tower destroyed. Back at camp, Neeko and Sabina find Miljan, who handed Irene over to the Evenki tribe for help. The three are later captured by the tribesmen.
10	"Strange Bedfellows"	Slava N. Jakovleff and Herbert James Winterstern	Shaun Hudson and Andrew Adair	September 9, 2013	1.81
At the research station, Johnny, Daniel, Sam, and Joyce use a radio to make contact with a rescue team. Meanwhile, the Evenki tribesmen take Sabina, Neeko, and Miljan to their encampment, where they find Esther, Annie, and a healed Irene. Believing the area is cursed due to the Valleymen creatures that roam the woods, the Evenki direct the six towards the research station.
11	"... Into the Oven"	Herbert James Winterstern and Matthew Arnold	Travis Rooks and Matthew Arnold	September 16, 2013	2.2
Season finale. A squad of Russian black ops soldiers arrives at the research station to kill the reunited contestants but is attacked by the Valleymen. The contestants escape in a truck, but Annie is killed by the troops. When the truck gets stuck in ice, Esther (who appears to possess the prize money) hijacks the truck. The contestants find shelter in an evacuated small town and are discovered by Jonathon (the host). Note: This episode was merged with the 12th episode to compensate for the Dateline NBC regarding the birth of Prince George of Cambridge, which delayed the airing of the 4th episode.

== Reception ==
On Rotten Tomatoes season 1 has a score of 55% based on reviews from 11 critics. On Metacritic it has a score of 53% based on reviews from 5 critics.

== DVD releases ==
On March 11, 2014 Lions Gate Entertainment released Siberia - Season one on DVD in Region 1 with all 11 episodes on a 3-disc set.

== See also ==
- Dead Set a fictional season of the real reality show Big Brother during the zombie apocalypse.
