= Joyce Giraud =

Puerto Rican actress and beauty pageant winner

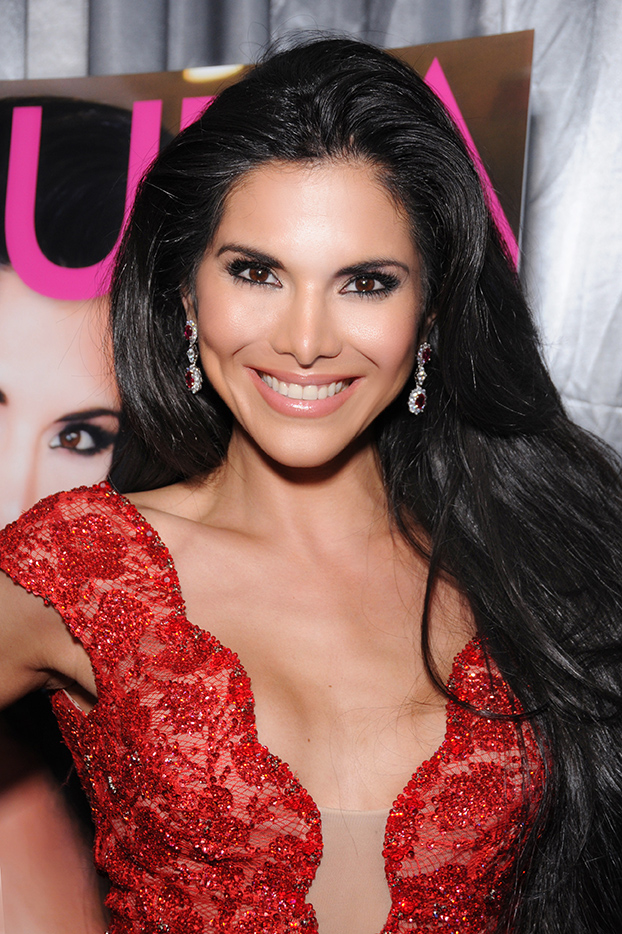
- Giraud in Beverly Hills, California in 2014
- Born: Joyce Marie Giraud Mojica; April 4, 1975 (age 51); Aguas Buenas, Puerto Rico
- Other names: Joyce Giraud de Ohoven; Joyce de Ohoven
- Education: Interamerican University of Puerto Rico (BA; BA)
- Occupations: Actress; model; producer
- Spouse: Michael Ohoven (m. 2009)
- Children: 2
- Beauty pageant titleholder
- Title: Miss Mundo de Puerto Rico 1994; Miss Universe Puerto Rico 1998
- Years active: 1990–present
- Major competitions: Miss Mundo de Puerto Rico 1994; (Winner); Miss World 1994; (Unplaced); Miss Universe Puerto Rico 1998; (Winner); Miss Universe 1998; (2nd Runner-Up)

Joyce Marie Giraud Mojica (born April 4, 1975), also known as Joyce Giraud de Ohoven, is a Puerto Rican actress, model and beauty pageant titleholder. In 1994, she competed at Miss World 1994 but failed to place in the semifinals. In 1998, Giraud was crowned Miss Universe Puerto Rico 1998 and represented Puerto Rico at Miss Universe 1998 where she finished as 2nd Runner-Up. She has since appeared in acting roles in television and film, and beginning in 2013 was a housewife on The Real Housewives of Beverly Hills for its fourth season.

== Early life and education ==
Giraud was born in Aguas Buenas, Puerto Rico. She graduated at 16, and shortly began modelling. Giraud attended the Interamerican University of Puerto Rico. She has two Bachelor of Arts degrees; one in Social Work and one in Special Education. After graduating she worked with underprivileged children and public housing projects in Puerto Rico.

== Career ==
Giraud began modeling to help her mother pay for her university studies and became one of the top models of Puerto Rico. She has appeared in numerous national and international campaigns. She describes having been discovered while working at the drive-thru of a KFC restaurant.

After winning the Miss Universe Puerto Rico, Giraud discovered her love of acting when director Vicente Castro cast her as the lead in his Coralito Tiene Dos Maridos, a remake of Sonia Braga's Dona Flor y Sus Dos Maridos. She received such great reviews that she found another passion in life. After doing many small roles in her native Puerto Rico, Giraud moved to Miami, Florida where she continued a successful modeling career. In 2001, after being the undefeated model of Star Search, she decided to take the leap toward Los Angeles where she has received parts in numerous films and TV shows.

In film, Giraud has had roles in David Fincher's Girl with the Dragon Tattoo; Dude, Where's My Car?, Miss Castaway, and Slayer. She has starred in TV shows like Baywatch, The Suite Life of Zack and Cody, Heist and Joey. Starting in 2007, she starred in the first two seasons of Tyler Perry's House of Payne as "Angel," and in 2013, she was a lead in NBC's Siberia. In 2013, she joined the main cast of The Real Housewives of Beverly Hills for the fourth season, becoming the show's first Latina and ethnic minority housewife. Her departure from the series was announced shortly after the reunion. During her run on the show, she was awarded with the "Loveliest Locks" award at Bravo's The Real Housewives Awards.

As a producer, Giraud executive produced the film Shadow People, as well as the TV show Siberia, and is credited as co-producer on the upcoming film Back Roads, based on the bestselling novel. In 2014, Giraud opened a school in Senegal, Africa with the YOU Foundation for Children in Need.

In 2014, she co-created the Spanish-language reality show Rica, Famosa, Latina and also serves as its executive producer. In 2015, she also created its companion talk show Rica la Noche, serving as both its host and executive producer.

== Pageantry and modeling ==
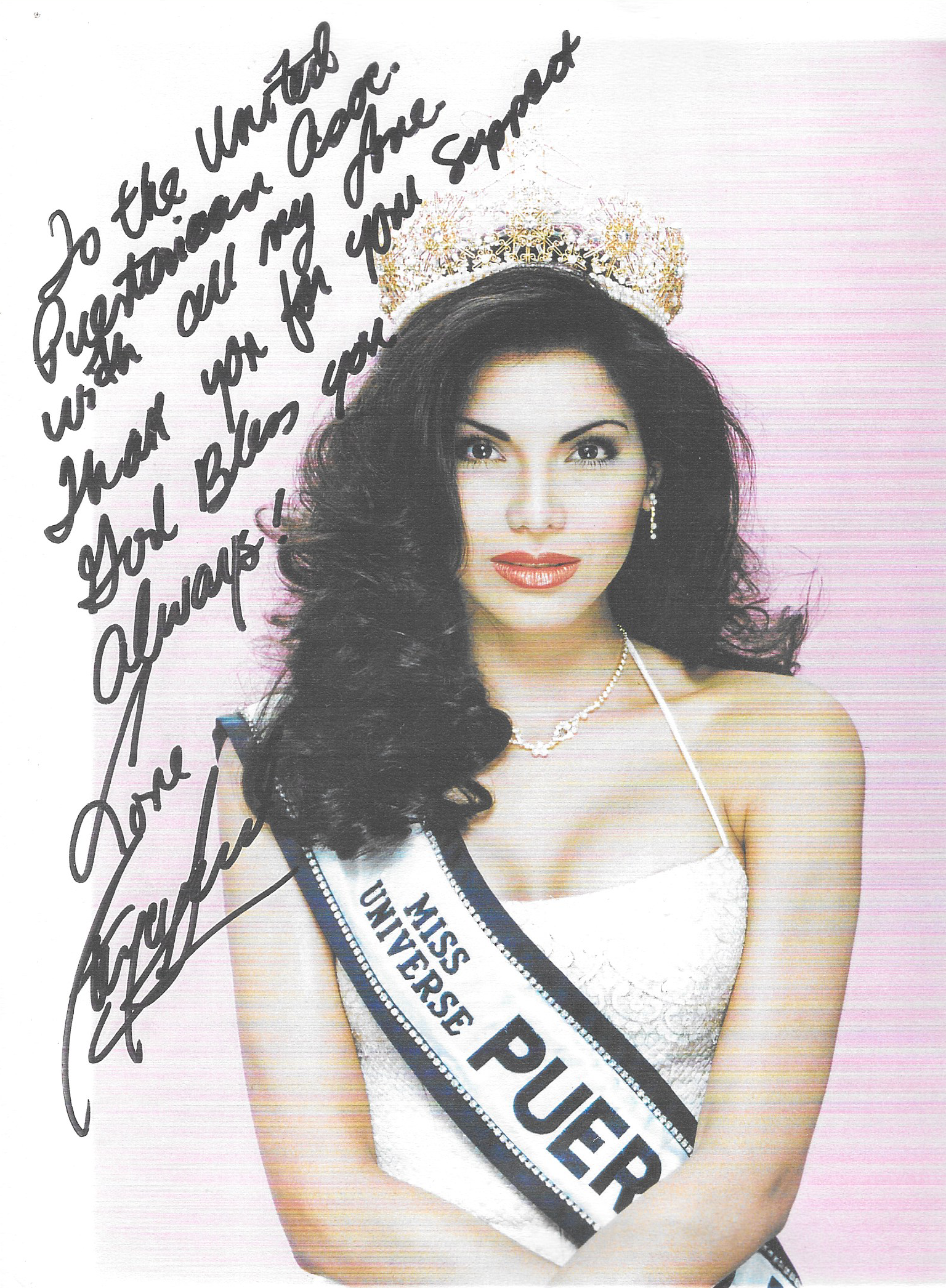
Joyce Giraud visited the Puerto Rican diaspora in Hawaii and this is an autographed picture to the United Puerto Rican Association of Hawaii.

Giraud has been one of the few Puerto Rican Supermodels, and has been featured on numerous magazine covers and in international campaigns.

In her early career, Giraud participated in a number of beauty pageants and became a titleholder multiple times, leading to the Miss Universe 1998 pageant where she finished as second runner-up. She is a two-time Miss Puerto Rico and previously represented Puerto Rico at Miss World 1994. Giraud won the 1994 Miss World Puerto Rico and the titles of Most Beautiful Hair, Most Beautiful Smile; Most Beautiful Face and Best Runway. She later represented Puerto Rico in the Queen of the Atlantics International in Spain, and won the title Queen of the Atlantics 1995. In 1997, she represented Puerto Rico in the Miss Venus International in Jacksonville, Florida and won her hometown the title. In 1998, Giraud won the title of Miss Aguas Buenas and then was crowned Miss Universe Puerto Rico. She also won the titles of Most Beautiful Hair, Most Beautiful Face, Best Body and the Miss Photogenic Award.

Despite a scandal that almost cost her the crown due to some sexy modeling shots, Giraud was cleared by Donald Trump to compete in the Miss Universe 1998 pageant in Hawaii where she was a crowd favorite and finished as 2nd runner-up behind Veruska Ramírez of Venezuela and winner Wendy Fitzwilliam of Trinidad and Tobago. Later that year, she wrote a book called "Joyce, Dreams and Realities", based on her experiences in the Miss Universe pageant.

In 2000, Giraud became the only undefeated model to win every episode of Star Search a.k.a. Destination Stardom in Honolulu, Hawaii.

In 2012, Giraud created the annual international beauty pageant Queen of the Universe, benefiting the programs of the UNESCO Foundation for Children in Need. Since then, she has produced and directed the annual event.

== Personal life ==
Giraud is married to Academy Award–nominated producer Michael Ohoven. They have two sons, Leonardo Alexander Michael Mario Benjamin Giraud de Ohoven (b. 2010) and Michael Valentino Mario Arthur Benjamin Giraud de Ohoven (b. 2011).

Giraud is Catholic.

== Filmography ==
=== Film and television ===
Year	Show	Role	Notes
1999	La Primera Finalista	Unknown	
1999	Coralito Tiene Dos Maridos	Coralito	
2000	Baywatch	Rachel	1 episode: "Dream Girl"
2000	Dude, Where's My Car?	Fabio's Girlfriend	Uncredited
2000	The Bold and the Beautiful	Spectra Model	2 episodes
2002	Viva TV	Herself	Guest Co-Host
2003	Diva Detectives	Herself	
2004	Miss Castaway and the Island Girls	Julie	Television film
2004	Latin Dragon	Claudia Sanchez	
2005	The Suite Life of Zack and Cody	Ursula	1 episode: "Grounded on the 23rd Floor"
2005	Joey	Maria	1 episode: "Joey and the ESL"
2006	Heist	Angel	2 episodes
2006	Slayer	Estrella	Television film
2007–2020	House of Payne	Angel	36 episodes
2011	The Girl with the Dragon Tattoo	Spain TV Reporter	
2013	Siberia	Carolina / Joyce	11 episodes; also costume designer
2013	Sin Límites	Herself	1 episode: "ADD/ADHD"
2013–2016	Vanderpump Rules	Herself	4 episodes
2013–2014	The Real Housewives of Beverly Hills	Herself	24 episodes
2015	Hell's Kitchen	Herself / Restaurant Patron	1 episode: "18 Chefs Compete"
2015	Dad Dudes	Laura	1 episode: "Pilot"
2015	Rica la Noche	Herself / Host	8 episodes
2017	Jeepers Creepers 3	Deputy Dana Lang	

=== Music videos ===
Year	Artist	Title
2000	98 Degrees	"Give Me Just One Night (Una Noche)"

=== Producer ===
Year	Work	Notes
2013	The Door	Executive producer
2015	Siberia	Co-executive producer
2015	Rica la Noche	Executive producer
2018	Rica Famosa Latina	Executive producer
2018	Back Roads	Co-producer
2022	Jeepers Creepers: Reborn	Co-producer

== See also ==
- List of Puerto Ricans
- Nunez v. Caribbean Int’l News Corp.

Awards and achievements
Preceded by (Trinidad and Tobago) Margot Bourgeois	Miss Universe 2nd runner-up 1998	Succeeded by (Spain) Diana Nogueira
Preceded by Ana Rosa Brito	Miss Puerto Rico Universe; 1998	Succeeded by Brenda Liz Lopez
Preceded by –	Miss Aguas Buenas Universe; 1998	Succeeded by –
Preceded by Ana Rosa Brito	Miss Mundo de Puerto Rico; 1994	Succeeded by Swanni Quiñones
