= Nunez v. Caribbean International News Corp. =

Copyright infringement lawsuit

Núñez v. Caribbean Int’l News Corp.
- Court: United States Court of Appeals for the First Circuit
- Full case name: Sixto Nunez v. Caribbean International News Corp.
- Decided: December 21, 2000
- Citation: 235 F.3d 18

Holding
- Affirmed decision

Court membership
- Judges sitting: Juan R. Torruella, Jay A. García-Gregory, Sandra L. Lynch

Laws applied
- 17 U.S.C. § 107

Núñez v. Caribbean Int’l News Corp. 235 F.3d 18 is a copyright infringement lawsuit where the court evaluated on the issue of whether unauthorized reproduction and publication of photographs that are themselves newsworthy constituted fair use. Puerto Rican newspaper El Vocero displayed photographs of Joyce Giraud, pageant winner without the photographer Sixto Núñez's permission in an article about the controversial photos. The appeal court affirmed the lower court's summary judgment that the use of the pictures qualify as fair use.

== Background ==
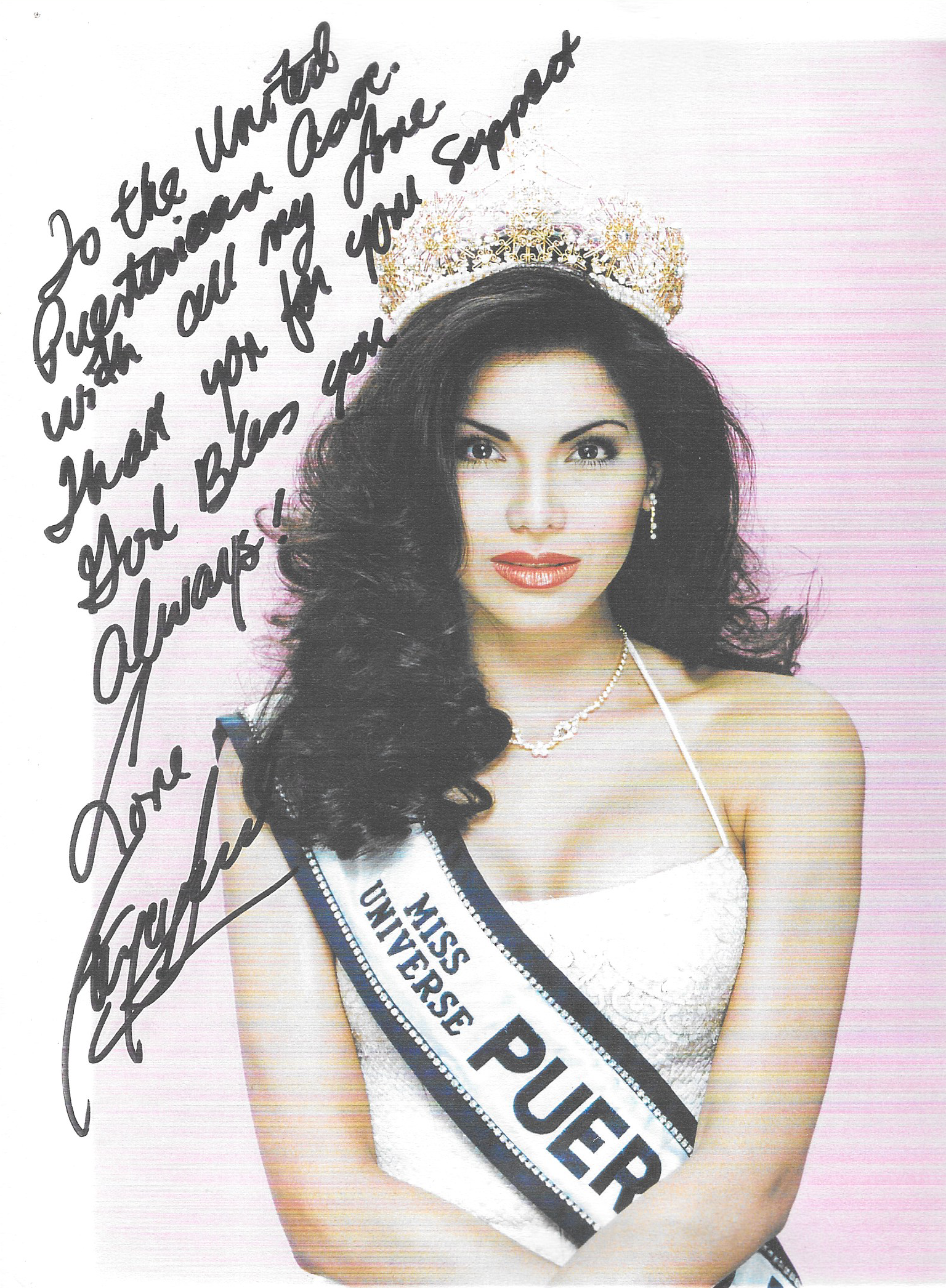
Joyce Giraud, Miss Puerto Rico Universe 1997

Sixto Núñez a professional photographer took several photos of Joyce Giraud, Miss Puerto Rico Universe 1997, for use in her modeling portfolio. Núñez distributed the photos among members of the Puerto Rico modeling community, according to normal practice. After the release, controversy arose over whether the photos were appropriate for Miss Puerto Rico Universe, because they were naked or nearly naked in some photos. A local television program displayed the photos on screen and asked random people if they believed the photo were "pornographic". The newspaper El Vocero obtained the photos and without Núñez's permission used them in an article about the controversy.

Núñez filed a lawsuit in the United States District Court for the District of Puerto Rico alleging El Vocero printed three of his photos without his permission violating the Copyright Act of 1976. The Distinct court applied the fair use test in 17 U.S.C. § 107 and ruled in favor of El Vocero and dismissed the complaint with prejudice. The fair use ruling was based on the newsworthiness of the photos, the minimum impact to Núñez's commercial photography business and the difficulty in presenting the story without the photos. Núñez appealed the decision.

== Opinion ==
Chief Judge Juan R. Torruella wrote the opinion finding the first, second and third factor to be in favor of fair use under 17 U.S.C. § 107 and the decision was affirmed.

For the first factor of fair use, purpose and character of use, the court stated that Caribbean International News Corp. use inform and "gain commercially," and that the two purposes offset each other in the fair use analysis. The photographs were used for commercial use to prompt readers to purchase the newspaper. The commercial nature of the reproduction counsels against a finding of fair use. The court also agreed with the lower court that "the pictures were the story." and Vocero gave the work a new meaning and use the work for a further purpose by transforming it into news that weighs in favor of fair use. The photos were also used in good faith obtaining them lawfully and attributing them to Núñez. The photos were available for general, unrestricted circulation, and redistribution.

For the second factor of fair use, the nature of the copyright, the court stated that the photos were not artistic representations designed to express ideas, emotions, or feelings but to highlight Giraud's abilities to model. The publication of the photos does not threaten Nunez's right of first publication. Nunez had not sought to limit and control dissemination during his distribution of the photos.

For the third factor of fair use, the amount and substantiality of the use, the court found that El Vocero admittedly copied the entire picture, but copying any less would make the picture useless to the story. This factor was counted as little consequence to the analysis.

For the fourth factor of fair use, the effect on the market, the court found that the use did not interfere with Núñez's commercial photography business.Publication in El Vocero was to increase demand for the photograph, and because any potential market for resale directly to the newspaper was unlikely to be developed, this factor favors a finding of fair use.
