= Rica, Famosa, Latina =

- Genre: Reality
- Created by: Joyce Giraud; Lenard Liberman
- Country of origin: United States
- Original language: English
- No. of seasons: 6
- No. of episodes: 185

Production
- Producers: Joyce Giraud; Lenard Liberman; Rubén Consuegra
- Running time: 60 minutes

Original release
- Network: Estrella TV
- Release: September 16, 2014 – December 18, 2022

Related
- The Real Housewives of Beverly Hills

Rica, Famosa, Latina (Rich, Famous, Latina) is an Estrella TV reality series which was co-created by Lenard Liberman of Estrella TV, and by Joyce Giraud. The Spanish-language show was inspired by the Real Housewives franchise.

Rica, Famosa, Latina premiered on September 16, 2014, and followed five financially successful Latina women in Los Angeles. Castmembers in the first season included Estela Mora, Rosie Rivera, Adriana Gallardo, Victoria Del Rosal and Elisa Beristain, the wife of Pepe Garza. Adriana Gallardo departed the show after the season ended, and she did not attend to the season reunion.

The second season in 2015, which premiered on Estrella TV on Monday, March 30, 2015. Elisa Beristain, Estela Mora, Rosie Rivera and Victoria del Rosal returned to another season, With Sissi Fleitas, Sandra Vidal, Luzelba Mansour and Maria Raquenel Join the Main Cast. Also Verónica Pliego join the cast in the episode 12. Adriana Gallardo make a guest appearance in the first episode. Mayeli Alonso also appeared as a guest in several episodes before joining the cast next season, as a friend of Elisa Beristain. Rosie Rivera, Estela Mora, Elisa Beristain, Maria Raquenel and Verónica Pliego departed the show after the season ended. Estela Mora did not attend to the season reunion.

The third Season premiered on Estrella TV on September 21, 2015. With the return of Victoria Del Rosal, Sandra Vida and Luzelba Mansour and . Niurka Marcos, Mayeli Alonso, and Andrea Garcia, join the cast. Rosie Rivera return as a guest in the second episode.

The fourth season premiered on Estrella TV on September 6, 2016. With the same cast of last season. Original Cast Member Elisa Beristain make a guest appearance in the episode 23. Mayeli Alonso, Sissi Fleitas, Victoria Del Rosal and Andrea Garcia departed the show after the season concluded.

The fifth season premiered on Estrella TV on September 18, 2017. Sandra Vidal, Luzelba Mansour, and Niurka Marcos, return to the show. Ninette Rios, Mimi Lazo, Scarlet Ortiz, and Patricia De Leon, join the cast.

In January 2022 it was confirmed that the show would return with a sixth season. Luzelba Mansour, Sandra Vidal and Mayeli Alonso returned to the show, while Niurka Marcos, Mimi Lazo, Ninette Rios, Scarlet Ortiz and Patricia De Leon did not. In their places, Marcela Iglesias, Mariana González and Kimberly Flores joined the cast.

== Timeline ==
Cast	Seasons					
Cast	1	2	3	4	5	6
Rosie Rivera	Main	Main	Guest			
Elisa Beristain	Main	Main		Guest		
Adriana Gallardo	Main	Guest				
Victoria Del Rosal	Main	Main	Main	Main		
Estela Mora	Main	Main				
Sissi Fleitas		Main	Main	Main		
Luzelba Lozano (anteriormente Luzelba Mansour)		Main	Main	Main	Main	Main
Sandra Vidal		Main	Main	Main	Main	Main
Verónica Pliego		Main				
María Raquenel		Main				
Niurka Marcos			Main	Main	Main	
Mayeli Alonso (anteriormente Mayeli Rivera)		Guest	Main	Main		Main
Andrea García			Main	Main		
Mimí Lazo					Main	
Patricia De León					Main	
Scarlet Ortiz					Main	
Ninette Ríos					Main	
Kimberly Flores						Main
Mariana González						Main
Marcela Iglesias						Main
Friend of Ricas
Lula Flores	Friend	Guest				
Gaby Ramirez	Friend					
Verona Prive			Friend			
Maria Allende				Friend	Friend	
Enrique Sapene				Guest	Friend	

== Series overview ==
Season	Episodes	Originally aired	
Season	Episodes	First aired	Last aired
1	37	September 16, 2014	November 24, 2014
2	30	March 30, 2015	May 20, 2015
3	38	September 21, 2015	November 25, 2015
4	46	September 6, 2016	December 1, 2016
5	36	September 18, 2017	November 20, 2017
6	10	October 16, 2022	December 18, 2022
