= List of The Riveras episodes =

The Riveras is an American reality television series that premiered on Universo on October 16, 2016. The series follows the five children of late Mexican-American singer Jenni Rivera as they begin to pursue their dreams and continue to honor Rivera's legacy.

On May 9, 2019, Telemundo announced that the series has been renewed for a fourth season that premiered on August 11, 2019.

== Series overview ==
Season	Episodes	Originally released	
Season	Episodes	First released	Last released
1	10	October 16, 2016	December 18, 2016
2	10	February 26, 2017	April 30, 2017
Special		December 9, 2017	
3	14	March 11, 2018	June 10, 2018
4	15	August 11, 2019	November 17, 2019

== Episodes ==
=== Season 1 (2016) ===
No. overall	No. in season	Title	Original release date	U.S. viewers (millions)
1	1	"Nueva cabeza de familia"	October 16, 2016	0.22
Chiquis must find the balance between her career and the family, now that she is the new head of the family. She is worried about the future of her brothers and sisters and anxious about the birth of her nephew.
2	2	"Little Divas"	October 23, 2016	0.15
Chiquis looks forward to going on stage. Jacqie feels ugly after giving birth and wants to look sexy for her husband.
3	3	"Movin' On"	October 30, 2016	0.14
Johnny tries to sabotage the sale of the family mansion. Chiquis wonders if she is ready to live with her boyfriend Angel. The family says goodbye to Jenni's house.
4	4	"Señor Madre"	November 6, 2016	0.17
Jacqie and her husband Mike change roles: she goes to work and he will take care of the children. Chiquis runs her first infomercial and looks for a home for Mikey and Jenicka.
5	5	"Birds & Boss Bees"	November 13, 2016	0.25
Chiquis asks for a birthday party for her dog, Lyric. Johnny admits that he is involved with a girl and the family advises him. Jacqie forces Mike to have a vasectomy.
6	6	"Get Your Geek On"	November 20, 2016	0.16
Chiquis' new work in Mexico makes Johnny independent and obtains his driving license. Jacqie receives a message from her father. The family goes to San Diego Comic-Con.
7	7	"Mi Padre"	November 27, 2016	0.17
Chiquis fears that she made a mistake when moving in with her boyfriend. Jacqie visits her father who is in prison and tries to forgive him. Johnny is ready to sing at a Jenni charity concert.
8	8	"Growing Pains"	December 4, 2016	0.19
Chiquis moves out of her boyfriend's house and debates between taking care of her siblings and demanding that they take responsibility. Jacqie and Jenicka plan a charity sale and include Jenni's items.
9	9	"Paloma Negra"	December 11, 2016	0.14
The family records a video in tribute to their mother. There is no comfort for Chiquis, being eliminated from the competition program in Mexico. Chiquis and Mikey try to reconcile after their fight.
10	10	"Mud Is Thicker Than Water"	December 18, 2016	0.15
Chiquis returns to her home in Mexico and encounters a fractured family. Jenicka juggles to survive without her mother's support and Johnny struggles with feelings of abandonment.

=== Season 2 (2017) ===
No. overall	No. in season	Title	Original release date
11	1	"L.A.M.A.S."	February 26, 2017
The Riveras are invited to the Latin AMAs. They can now experience a world that belonged to their mother and Chiquis. Jacqie and Mike compete to see who loses more weight and receive support.
12	2	"Million Dollar Mexican"	March 5, 2017
Chiquis closes her salon to devote more time to her beauty line, but worries about firing her friends. Jacqie motivates Mike to look for a new beginning selling real estate.
13	3	"Bright Lights, Big Sisters"	March 12, 2017
The girls go to NY for several press conferences, but Jenicka and Jacqie are not sure they want to have such a public life.
14	4	"The Butt Stops Here"	March 19, 2017
Chiquis starts working on her second album. She challenges Mikey to take his artistic career seriously and for that, she locks him in the garage for 24 hours.
15	5	"Divine Inspiration"	March 26, 2017
Jacquie wants to take her music career seriously, but she must overcome her stage fright, singing in a beauty pageant for men. Chiquis supports Johnny to sing at the party.
16	6	"Día de los Muertos"	April 2, 2017
The boys prepare for their mother's return to the stage in a spooky presentation in a cemetery. Jacqie asks everyone to donate their inheritance to a charity.
17	7	"The Cup is Half Empty"	April 9, 2017
Chiquis removes her breast implants. Mikey and Jenicka finally move to an apartment alone, but they can't escape the nosy Chiquis.
18	8	"The Day After Tomorrow"	April 16, 2017
Chiquis auditions to play the role of her mother in a telenovela that will be filmed in Miami and Cupid surprises her. Jacqie tries to convince Mike that she needs a breast reduction.
19	9	"Mex in the City"	April 23, 2017
20	10	"Talking Rivera"	April 30, 2017
The siblings reveal their favorite moments and the most shameful and scandalous of this season.

=== Special (2017) ===
Title	Original release date
"Remembering Jenni, Our Mom"	December 9, 2017
The Rivera family, their friends and fans celebrate the life of Jenni Rivera to commemorate the fifth anniversary of her departure, with her best moments and stories never before told.

=== Season 3 (2018) ===
No. overall	No. in season	Title	Original release date	U.S. viewers (millions)
21	1	"El amor no vive aquí"	March 11, 2018	0.17
Chiquis and her boyfriend, Lorenzo, decide to move together while Jacqie separates from her husband, Mike. Johnny graduates and Jenicka announces that she no longer wants to live with her brother Mikey.
22	2	"Tu eres el Juan que quiero"	March 18, 2018	0.14
Chiquis tries to reconcile with Lorenzo after a fight, and Johnny is forced to get his first real job. Jacqie seeks a therapy for couples.
23	3	"Casamenteras"	March 25, 2018	0.13
The sisters try to find a date for Mikey, while Jacqie adapts to being a single mother and Chiquis strives to be a better theater artist.
24	4	"¿Juntos o por separado?"	April 1, 2018	N/A
Family camping becomes a competition for survival skills, style and genres. Jenicka pursues her dream of modeling large sizes.
25	5	"Chiquis se lleva una sorpresa"	April 8, 2018	0.13
Chiquis wants to freeze her eggs, but discovers a more serious medical problem. Johnny struggles with the idea of going to college and Jacqie seeks to clarify her feelings after separating from Mike.
26	6	"Conmoción"	April 15, 2018	N/A
The Riveras join the people of Mexico and launch a series of beneficial efforts to support the victims of the devastating earthquakes. Jacqie faces her fifth wedding anniversary.
27	7	"Pónle un anillo"	April 22, 2018	0.19
Chiquis and Lorenzo find a house that suits both of them. Mikey and Jenicka return home, after a year together.
28	8	"Se acercan los LAMAS"	April 29, 2018	0.14
Chiquis performs at the Latin American Music Awards with Natalia Jiménez. Jacqie decides it's time to stop hiding from the world and Mikey, Johnny and Jenicka start a joke war.
29	9	"Jacqie una estrella en Nascar"	May 6, 2018	0.14
Jacqie's wish list leads her to perform the National Anthem at a NASCAR event.
30	10	"Raíces"	May 13, 2018	N/A
Jacqie explores the family's migration from Mexico, while Chiquis plans to see her father in prison. Mikey faces his anger problems and Johnny makes a pact with his boyfriend.
31	11	"Grandes sueños pequeñas casas"	May 20, 2018	N/A
Chiquis goes on a tour with El Dasa and invites Johnny to be her videographer. Mikey considers moving to a small house.
32	12	"El amor gana"	May 27, 2018	0.11
Johnny finally decides to talk to the whole family, but a leaked photo on social media threatens to break his plan. Jacqie registers the family for a dodgeball tournament.
33	13	"El comediante"	June 3, 2018	N/A
Mikey accepts a challenge to do stand-up comedy. Chiquis questions her career and the relationship with Lorenzo. Jacqie accepts her new single life. Johnny challenges Jenicka.
34	14	"Indestructible"	June 10, 2018	N/A
Chiquis suspends her commitment to Lorenzo. Jacqie finally divorces Mike. Johnny negotiates with Chiquis to get his first tattoo.

=== Season 4 (2019) ===
No. overall	No. in season	Title	Original release date	U.S. viewers (millions)
35	1	"Día de las Madres"	August 11, 2019	0.12
Chiquis and Lorenzo reconcile and unite their families under the same roof. Lorenzo's mother arrives for Mother's Day and they listen together, for the first time, Jenni's last single.
36	2	"Chisme"	August 18, 2019	0.07
Chiquis is in the midst of her sisters who will be her bridesmaids and her best friend, who wants to control her bachelorette party. Lorenzo defends himself against the accusations of his ex-wife.
37	3	"Profundo final"	August 25, 2019	N/A
Chiquis feels the pressure of her first acting job as an artist. Lorenzo thinks about the consequences of his television interview. Jacqie looks for a new house and the family visits SeaWorld.
38	4	"Confiésalo"	September 1, 2019	N/A
Chiquis' sisters and her maid of honor, Vanessa, compete to see who will organize her bachelorette party. Chiquis films her most recent music video.
39	5	"Jacuzzi y resaca"	September 8, 2019	N/A
Chiquis wants to make her bachelorette party secretly, without her sisters. For that she travels to La Vegas, but she is annoyed to discover that Lorenzo planned his party that same weekend.
40	6	"Thunder From Down Under"	September 15, 2019	0.08
Chiquis fears having broken the rules of her bachelorette party when going to a strip show. Jacqie and Jenicka get mad at Chiquis. Lorenzo is harassed by paparazzi in Las Vegas.
41	7	"La Reina"	September 22, 2019	0.09
Lorenzo fails to surprise Chiquis in Las Vegas. Jacqie receives her daughter Jaylah at home. Chiquis plans to launch her perfume and at the same time deals with the wedding chaos.
42	8	"Se filtra informacion"	September 29, 2019	0.06
News of the secret wedding of Chiquis and Lorenzo is leaked to the press. The situation threatens to destroy the ceremony. Grandpa makes Johnny an offer difficult to refuse.
43	9	"Control de daños"	October 6, 2019	0.10
Chiquis and Lorenzo have to deal with the leaked details of their wedding, while the clock marks the big day. Jacqie and Jenicka must make an important decision.
44	10	"Los novios"	October 13, 2019	N/A
Chiquis and Lorenzo get married and manage to clarify the conspiracy of the media that wanted to infiltrate the wedding. Uncle Lupillo invites the family to his daughter's birthday party.
45	11	"Dia de juicio"	October 20, 2019	0.11
Chiquis and Lorenzo travel to El Paso to face his ex-wife in court. Jacqie struggles with the decision of her divorce.
46	12	"Regreso a casa"	October 27, 2019	0.09
In El Paso, Chiquis gets to know a little more about her husband's life. Jacqie takes her husband Mike to a family event.
47	13	"Altas expectativas"	November 3, 2019	0.11
Chiquis seriously considers the possibility of getting pregnant. Lorenzo plans his artistic career as a soloist. Jacqie seeks courage to talk to Chiquis about her reconciliation with Mike.
48	14	"Hacer y deshacer"	November 10, 2019	0.09
Chiquis decides to ask her team to move out of the house. Jacqie faces the pressure of the family to protect her inheritance and also receives a surprise.
49	15	"Felices para siempre"	November 17, 2019	0.13
Jacqie's pregnancy is leaked to the media and Chiquis thinks there is a spy in her team. Chizo shows his wedding video to the family and Mikey presents a tribute to Jenni.
