= The Riveras =

- Genre: Reality
- Starring: Chiquis Rivera; Jacqie Campos; Michael Marin; Jenicka Lopez; Juan Angel Lopez; Miguel Campos; Jaylah Hope Yanez
- Country of origin: United States
- No. of seasons: 4
- No. of episodes: 49 (list of episodes)

Production
- Executive producers: Janney Marin; Edward Paige; Liane Su
- Production company: Blank Paige Productions

Original release
- Network: NBC Universo
- Release: October 16, 2016 – November 17, 2019

Related
- I Love Jenni; Chiquis 'N Control

The Riveras is an American reality television series that airs on UNIVERSO. The show is a spin-off of I Love Jenni. The series follows the five children of deceased Mexican-American singer Jenni Rivera as they begin to pursue their dreams and continue to honor Rivera's legacy. The series debuted on October 16, 2016.

On May 9, 2019, Telemundo announced that the series had been renewed for a fourth season. The season premiered on August 11, 2019. On September 24, 2020 it was revealed that the show had been cancelled.

== Production ==
=== Background and Development ===
After the death of singer Jenni Rivera, I Love Jenni ran its third and final season on NBC Universo (then known as mun2). The final episodes of the third season focused on Rivera's five children as they deal with life after her death. The final season of I Love Jenni was the most-watched original mun2 original program. It finished as the fifth most-watched program with Hispanic females 18-49 and seventh most watched series with Hispanic adults 18-49

In May 2016, Telemundo and UNIVERSO announced The Riveras as an upcoming series on UNIVERSO as well as other Jenni Rivera related programming.

On November 6, 2017, during the finale of Mariposa de Barrio on Telemundo, UNIVERSO announced that a third season would premiere in 2018.

=== Cast ===
The series stars the five children of singer Jenni Rivera: Chiquis, Jacqie, Michael, Jenicka, and Juan Angel, as they pursue their dreams and honor their mother's legacy. Viewers see how they manage their mother's enterprise featuring her music, tequila, fashion line, and love foundation. The show features archive footage of Jenni Rivera from I Love Jenni and Chiquis 'N Control.

== Episodes ==
| Season | Episodes | Originally released | |
| Season | Episodes | First released | Last released |
|---|---|---|---|
| 1 | 10 | October 16, 2016 | December 18, 2016 |
| 2 | 10 | February 26, 2017 | April 30, 2017 |
| Special | | December 9, 2017 | |
| 3 | 14 | March 11, 2018 | June 10, 2018 |
| 4 | 15 | August 11, 2019 | November 17, 2019 |
