= Ahora (Chiquis Rivera album) =

Studio album by Chiquis Rivera
- Released: June 2, 2015
- Genre: Banda; Latin pop
- Language: Spanish
- Label: Sweet Sound Records
- Producer: Chiquis Rivera

Chiquis Rivera chronology
Ahora (2015)	Entre Botellas (2018)

Singles from Ahora
- 1. "Paloma Blanca" Released: 2014; 2. "Esa No Soy Yo" Released: 2014; 3. "La Malquerida" Released: 2014; 4. "Completamente" Released: 2015; 5. "Aprovechame" Released: 2015

Ahora (English: "Now") is the debut studio album by American recording artist Chiquis Rivera, released on June 2, 2015 by Sweet Sound Records.

Ahora reached number-one on the Billboard Top Latin Albums and Billboard Regional Mexican Albums charts in the United States.

== Recordings ==
The album consists of a mixture of uptempos and ballads, inspired by the pop and banda genres. As executive producer of the album, Chiquis took a wide role in its production, co-writing a majority of the songs, choosing which ones to produce and sharing ideas on the mixing and mastering of tracks.

== Commercial reception ==
Ahora reached number one on the Billboard Top Latin Albums and Billboard Regional Mexican Albums charts in the United States. According to Billboard magazine, Rivera is the first female to top the chart since her late mother, Jenni Rivera, opened at No. 1 on Dec. 20, 2014 with the posthumous album 1 Vida – 3 Historias: Metamorfosis – Despedida de Culiacán – Jenni Vive 2013. According to Nielsen SoundScan, Ahora sold 7,000 copies in its first week of release. Ahora was certified gold (Latin field) by the Recording Industry Association of America (RIAA) for shipments of 30,000 copies.

== Critical reception ==
Professional ratings
Review scores
Source	Rating
Billboard	3/5 stars
Allmusic	3/5 stars

Thom Jurek of Allmusic, gave the album three out of five stars and said, "...her [Chiquis'] bravery and growing sophistication that are most impressive." Angie Romero of Billboard also gave the album three out of five stars.

== Track listing ==
No.	Title	Writer(s)	Producer(s)	Length
1.	"Amor Eterno"	Alberto Aguilera Valadez	Janney Marin Rivera	3:46
2.	"Esa No Soy Yo"	Janney Marin Rivera	Rivera	3:49
3.	"Aprovechame"	Rivera	Rivera	2:36
4.	"Paloma Blanca (Vuela Libre) (with Sebastian Jacome)"	Rivera, Julio Reyes	Rivera	3:59
5.	"Suenalo"	Claudia Brant	Rivera	3:39
6.	"Completamente"	Rivera	Rivera	3:01
7.	"Feliz de la vida"	Rivera	Rivera	3:25
8.	"La Malquerida"	Gloria de los Ángeles Treviño Ruiz	Rivera	3:35
9.	"Esa No Soy Yo (Pop)"	Rivera	Rivera	3:05
10.	"Ahora"	Rivera	Rivera	4:22
11.	"Paloma Negra"	Tomás Mendez	Rivera	3:24
12.	"CPR"	Rivera	Rivera	3:32
13.	"I'm Not That Girl"	Rivera	Rivera	3:05
14.	"Paper Bullets"	Rivera	Rivera	3:34

== Charts ==
=== Weekly charts ===
Chart (2015)	Peak position
US Billboard 200	82
US Top Latin Albums (Billboard)	1
US Regional Mexican Albums (Billboard)	1

=== Year-end charts ===
Chart (2015)	Position
US Top Latin Albums (Billboard)	28

== Sales and certifications ==
Region	Certification	Certified units/sales
United States (RIAA)	Gold (Latin)	30,000^{^}
^{^} Shipments figures based on certification alone.

== See also ==
- List of number-one Billboard Latin Albums from the 2010s
