= ¡Viva Hollywood! =

- Created by: Fenton Bailey; Randy Barbato; Tom Campbell
- Directed by: Danny Salles
- Starring: María Conchita Alonso; Carlos Ponce
- Country of origin: United States
- Original language: English
- No. of seasons: 1
- No. of episodes: 8

Production
- Executive producers: Luis Balaguer; Fenton Bailey
- Running time: 60 minutes

Original release
- Network: VH1
- Release: April 13 – May 25, 2008

¡Viva Hollywood! is an American reality television series that aired for one season on VH1. The show features twelve Latino actors competing for the role of "America's Numero Uno Telenovela Star". The winner also received a contract with Telemundo, the biggest telenovela production company in the United States.

== Contestants ==
Winner

- Berto Colón, 35, New Jersey (Puerto Rican)

Eliminated

- María Páez, 29, Harlem, New York (Puerto Rican/Afro-Cuban)
- Jainmy Martínez, 30, New Jersey (Dominican)
- Alexcy Aranguren, 32, Orange County, California (Ecuadorian)
- Kalain Santos, 24, Miami, Florida (Puerto Rican)
- Janet Michel, 28, Los Angeles, California (Mexican / Spanish)
- Vinci Alonso, 26, Miami, Florida (Puerto Rican)
- Silvia Tovar, 24, New York (Quit) (Colombian)
- Enrique Sapene, 28, Los Angeles, California (Venezuelan)
- Roseny Carrero, 23, Ponce, PR (Puerto Rican)
- Geovannie Gómez, A.K.A Geovanni Gopradi, 24, Fort Lauderdale, Florida (Cuban)
- Gisel Saumat, 25, Miami, Florida (Cuban)
- Jenn Pinto, 22, Brooklyn, New York (Puerto Rican / Ecuadorian)

== Eliminations ==
Actors	Episodes								
Actors	1A	1B	2	3	4	5	6	7	8
Berto	WIN	SAFE	WIN	SAFE	SAFE	SAFE	SAFE	SAFE	WINNER
Jenn	SAFE	SAFE	SAFE	WIN	WIN	SAFE	DUEL	SAFE	OUT
Gisel	SAFE	SAFE	SAFE	SAFE	SAFE	WIN	SAFE	DUEL	OUT
Geo	DUEL	SAFE	DUEL	SAFE	WIN	DUEL	WIN	OUT	
Roseny	SAFE	WIN	SAFE	SAFE	SAFE	SAFE	OUT		
Enrique	SAFE	SAFE	SAFE	SAFE	DUEL	OUT			
Silvia	WIN	SAFE	SAFE	SAFE	SAFE	QUIT			
Vinci	SAFE	SAFE	SAFE	DUEL	OUT				
Janet	SAFE	DUEL	SAFE	OUT					
Kalain	SAFE	SAFE	SAFE	OUT					
Alexcy	SAFE	SAFE	OUT						
Jainmy	DUEL	OUT							
Maria	OUT								

This contestant is the winner of the series.
The contestant was the challenge winner.
The contestant did not face elimination.
The contestant was in The Duel, but wasn't eliminated.
The contestant was eliminated.
The contestant was eliminated outside of panel and did not compete in El Duelo.
The contestant won the challenge, but was eliminated.
The contestant quit the competition.

== Episode Summaries ==
Episode	7 Deadly Sin	Challenge Winner	Prize Won	Prized Shared With	Challenge Loser	Voted In To 'El Duelo'	Eliminated
1A	Passion	Silvia & Vinci	Appearance	-	Janet	Jainmy & Maria	Maria
1B	Passion	Roseny	Makeover	—	Janet	Jainmy	Jainmy
2	Lust	Berto	$10,000 Shopping Spree	Vinci	Alexcy	Geovannie	Alexcy
3	Vanity	Jenn	$20,000 Watch or Necklace	—	Janet	Vinci	Kalain^{1} & Janet
4	Drama	Jenn & Geovannie	Skylite view of the city & Xbox 360	^{2}	Enrique	Vinci	Vinci
5	Fire	Gisel		—	Enrique	Geovannie	Silvia^{3} & Enrique
6	Seduction	Geovannie		—	Roseny	Jenn	Roseny
7	Scandal	Geovannie		—	Gisel	Geovannie	Geovannie

Note:

- ^{1}Kalain was sent home immediately and did not compete in the Duel.
- ^{2}Jenn and Geovannie both won the challenge.
- ^{3}Silvia left the competition due to a family emergency.

== Episodes ==
=== Episode 1: Passion ===
Our twelve contestants arrive at "La Casa de Locos" where they are greeted by co-host, telenovela leading man and crossover American star Carlos Ponce, and the "Diva de la Casa", Latin superstar María Conchita Alonso. Walter Mercado appears in a magic portrait to tell them they must master the Seven Deadly Sins of Telenovela. The first sin is Passion. The group learns how to fight telenovela-style. They pair off to shoot fight scenes complete with stage punches, slaps, drink throws, food fights and hair pulls. Janet wasn't so passionate in her scene and was placed in the duel. Roseny, on the other hand was the best and awarded with immunity, a free makeover and dinner with a famous Latina actress, Sofía Vergara. Janet must face off with the person that the contestants vote into "El Duelo". They vote in Jainmy who eventually is killed off in a telenovela death scene which means she is eliminated.

- Special Guest(s): Sofía Vergara

=== Episode 2: Lust ===
The contestants brace themselves for a challenge in the sin of Lust. Telenovela romantic leads Christian De La Fuente and his wife Angélica Castro guest star to teach them the art of romantic sex for the camera. To prepare, the group warms up with yoga. The group is surprised when the instructors strip and ask the contestants to do their yoga in the buff. Sparks fly when several contestants strip completely naked. Tensions mount as the scenes are assigned and include a three-way scene, a lesbian scene and a gay love scene. Roseny, being the previous challenge winner, must cast each scene and when she puts Berto and Vinci in the gay love scene. Vinci breaks down and threatens to leave la casa, in turn he is accused of being homophobic by the cast (which he denies.), In the end he decides to participate. Alexcy's poor acting puts him in el duelo and Giovannie is voted in to face him. Alexcy's charm at elimination was not enough to save him and he was eliminated.

- Special Guest(s): Cristian de la Fuente & Angélica Castro

=== Episode 3: Vanity ===
Maria Conchita, a former Miss Venezuela, announces that for the sin of vanity they must compete in the first annual Viva Hollywood Pageant where they must walk the runway and perform a talent. The loser will leave the show immediately. Fights ensue when Kalain chooses the same talent as another contestant, and one Jenn dances herself sick, literally. Pageant expert, Scott Grossman, is on hand to teach them to work the catwalk. But the pageant takes a twist when Mexico's "Ugly Betty", Angélica Vale announces that they are all getting "Ugly Makeovers" and must compete as hideous characters. Kalain is instantly eliminated for his poor job in the "Ugly Pageant", and Janet's unoriginal character places her in the duel. Meanwhile, annoyed with Vinci's arrogance, the contestants place Vinci in the duel but it is Janet that is sent packing.

- Special Guest(s): Scott Grossman & Angélica Vale

=== Episode 4: Drama ===
Vinci continues to clash with the other contestants while they gather to learn the next challenge, and are surprised to find telenovela leading lady, Lorena Rojas crying in the dining room. It's just an act, and they must do the same in a "crying game" around the table where they have three minutes to burst into tears with a sad personal tale. The winner chooses her partner for the dramatic challenge to come. Silvia wins and trades in her partner, Giovannie, with Berto. To help the contestants come in touch with their feelings, the group travels to a Hypnosis Institute where they are hypnotized to experience past life regressions by expert Michele Guzy - The Mind Coach. In the challenge, the group must pretend to be victims of ridiculous problems (recovering nudists, telenovela addicts, etc.) and appear on a talk show with journalist, María Celeste, who invites them to share their sob story on the couch, Oprah-style, in difficult (and hilarious) dramatic improvisations. Jenn and Giovannie win the challenge. Enrique lost the challenge and is sent to el duelo. Meanwhile, Gisel becomes jealous of Silvia and Berto's relationship and votes Silvia into el duelo but the other contestants send Vinci back into el duelo and he is eliminated.

- Special Guest(s): Lorena Rojas & María Celeste

=== Episode 5: Fire ===
- Special Guest(s): Charo & Sergio Trujillos

=== Episode 6: Seduction ===
- Special Guest(s): Daisy Fuentes
