= Summerville Baptist Church =

Baptist church in Summerville, South Carolina

- Location: Summerville, South Carolina
- Country: United States
- Denomination: Baptist

History
- Founded: January 29, 1896

Summerville Baptist Church is a Baptist congregation in Summerville, South Carolina. It was organized in 1896 and moved to its Central Avenue property in 1948. The church produced the Low Country Singing Christmas Tree, an annual community performance staged from 1990 through 2014.

== History ==
The congregation was organized on January 29, 1896, by fourteen charter members. Twelve transferred from Citadel Square Baptist Church in Charleston, and two transferred from Cannon Street Baptist Church. The church purchased property on Second South Street between Pine and Laurel streets in 1896. Its first building was dedicated on April 17, 1898.

A 1904 report in The Baptist Courier described cooperative Sunday evening services involving the Baptist, Methodist and Presbyterian congregations in Summerville. It also reported missionary work near Ladson and north of the railroad, along with a May 1904 revival.

The church later purchased the Cuthbert property at Central and Carolina avenues for $4,500. The congregation held its first service at the property on June 13, 1948. The church's centennial was the subject of a 1996 feature in The Post and Courier.

== Low Country Singing Christmas Tree ==
The church began presenting the Low Country Singing Christmas Tree in 1990 after a group from the congregation attended a similar production at Shandon Baptist Church in Columbia. Volunteers constructed the original framework using plans from the Shandon production.

By 2010, the production used a 35-foot structure holding more than 80 singers. Approximately 350 people participated in the production, including singers, musicians, actors, technical workers and parking attendants. Six performances drew a combined audience of approximately 4,000 people, and the production cost was reported as $50,000.

The church presented the production for the final time in 2014. The 25th season involved approximately 350 participants, including 87 singers in the tree, a children's choir, an orchestra and a dramatic cast. Some singers and volunteers had participated every year since the production began.

== Community work ==
During the early months of the COVID-19 pandemic, the church helped smaller area congregations with technical advice and assistance posting worship services online. WCIV described Summerville Baptist as one of the area's established congregations participating in cooperative efforts to support churches affected by closures.

In April 2020, church members prepared more than 2,000 meals for employees of Trident Medical Center and Summerville Medical Center. Approximately 700 health care workers received meals through the project.
