= Mary Boquitas =

Mexican singer (born 1969)

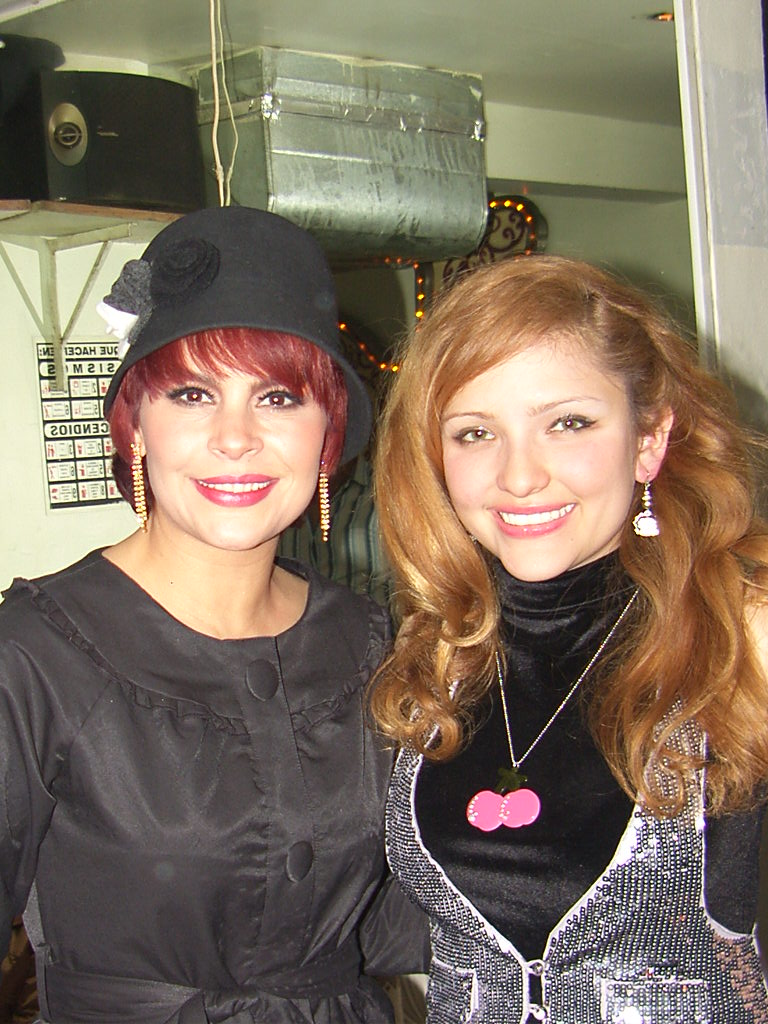
- Mary Boquitas (left) with Cherry Ahava in 2008
- Born: María Raquenel Portillo Jiménez; 23 December 1969 (age 56); Tamaulipas, Mexico
- Occupations: Singer; actress
- Years active: 1980s–present
- Spouse: Sergio Andrade (m. 1984; div. 1990)

María Raquenel Portillo Jiménez (born 23 December 1969), best known as Mary Boquitas, is a Mexican singer and actress.

== Early life ==
She was born on 23 December 1969 in Tamaulipas.

== Career ==
In the early 1980s, she auditioned with tycoon music producer Sergio Andrade to be a singer, with whom she married when she was 15 years old. In 1985, Andrade formed a girl group, managed by himself. Portillo was chosen for the group; the name "Boquitas Pintadas" was chosen because it sounded very different from the names of other typical teenage bands of the era, many of which tried to copy Menudo with their name. Because of the band's name, Mary Raquenel Portillo later became known as "Mary Boquitas".

Gloria Trevi was another member of the band. "Boquitas Pintadas" had five members in total; however, it was Trevi and Portillo who were able to forge a friendship that went beyond their days at "Boquitas Pintadas". She continued living with Sergio Andrade, and was a backup singer at Gloria Trevi's performances as well.

In 1994 Sony Music International released her first solo album, produced by Andrade, named "Mary Boquitas" and from that album the song "A Contratiempo", which was a successful single in Mexico staying many weeks in first place on radio stations, became a favorite song till now in Mexico. Mary Boquitas was considered one of the best singers in Mexico and Latin America at the time.

In 2000, Raquenel was arrested and imprisoned in Brazil along with Sergio Andrade and Gloria Trevi. She was accused of corruption of minors. Furthermore, she was believed to be Sergio Andrade's accomplice in the rape of teenager Karina Yapor, who got pregnant by him. She was further accused of abandoning Karina's son in Spain (under Andrade’s command). Moreover, in Brazil she was also accused of dismembering the corpse of Gloria Trevi's dead daughter before being thrown in a river (all by order of Andrade), who died mysteriously thirty-three days after she was born. However, Raquenel and Gloria were absolved in 2004 and were released.

In November 2004 she was invited by Carmen Salinas to be a part of the play "Aventurera". Boquitas, from then until 2008, was one of the principal stars in the play (as an actress, dancer and singer).

In 2009 she released a new album titled Para Olvidarte. Boquitas was "Martina", a successful role in the soap opera "Muchachitas como tú" in Mexico and now playing in US. She won two awards for that role.

In 2008 she composed and sang on a new album produced by Joan Romagoza, a Spanish composer and producer.

In 2015, she starred in the second season of the reality TV series Rica, Famosa, Latina.

In 2016, she starred in the We TV (U.S. TV channel) series My Life is a Telenovela.

In 2017 she released the single "Una Nueva Mujer" which met moderate success in YouTube.

== Personal life ==
She and Andrade got divorced in 1990. Nevertheless, she kept on living with him in spite of the fact that he married 15 years-old Aline Hernández and also that he had formed a "harem" made of young girls who lived together with him, including Gloria Trevi, who attempted to become a superstar thanks to Sergio Andrade.
