= Juan Rivera (singer) =

American singer (born 1978)

- Born: Juan Rivera Saavedra; February 22, 1978 (age 48); Long Beach, California
- Origin: Long Beach, California
- Genre: Regional Mexican
- Occupations: Singer; actor
- Labels: Divina Music; Cintas Acuario; Regio Music; Fonovisa Records; Hacienda Records; Univision Records; Sony Music; Linea Music

Juan Rivera Saavedra is an American singer and actor of Mexican heritage. He is part of one of the most prominent families, leading in regional Mexican music in the United States. His family includes singers, Jenni Rivera, Lupillo Rivera, Chiquis Rivera, and businesswoman Rosie Rivera. His songs "El Ser Equivocado" and "La Lampara" ranked on the Billboard Latin charts.

== Early life and early career ==
Juan Rivera was born to Mexican parents, Pedro Rivera and Rosa Saavedra in the United States. He began his singing career at the age of 16 releasing his first record, El Atizador in 1996. He also became a father at an early age. He is the younger brother of Regional Mexican singer Jenni Rivera.

=== Film ===
| Year | Title | Role | Notes |
|---|---|---|---|
| 1994 | La dinastía de Los Pérez | José Luis Perez | |
| 2001 | Jefe de nadie | Extra | |

=== Television ===
| Year | Title | Role | Notes |
|---|---|---|---|
| 2011–2013 | I Love Jenni | Himself | Recurring cast |
| 2013 | Billboard Latin Music Awards | Himself | Performer |
| 2023 | La casa de los famosos | Himself | Contestant |
