= Premios Texas =

- Awarded for: Outstanding Achievements in the Latin Music Industry
- Location: Austin, Texas
- Country: United States
- Presented by: KAKW Univision 62
- First award: 2005
- Website: http://www.PremiosTexas.com/

Premios Texas (Texas Latin Awards) is a Latin music awards celebration.

Produced by KAKW Univision 62 Austin, "Premios Texas" bestows awards annually to the winners from the five most popular Latin music genres including - Pop, Tropical, Regional Mexican, Rock and Urban - as well as the Lifetime Achievement Award, given to a performer who, during their lifetime, has made creative contributions of outstanding artistic significance to Latin music.

== History ==
Premios Texas is an annual people's choice award ceremony honoring the best in the Latin music industry. Based in Austin, Texas, the show debuted in 2005 at The One World Theatre to a local audience of 200 spectators.

Hosts and celebrity attendees include:

=== 2013 ===
Hosted by: Carlos Calderon & Alejandra Espinoza

Attendees/Winners Included:

- Gloria Trevi
- Moderatto
- Fey
- La Maquinaria Norteña
- Noel Torres
- Diana Reyes
- Jking y Maximan
- La Leyenda
- Andres Cuervo
- Banda La Trakalosa de Monterrey
- Chingo Bling
- 8 segundos
- Siggno
- El Pelón del Mikrophone
- AJ castillo
- Grupo Treo

=== 2012 ===
Hosted by: Cynthia Urias & Jose Ron

Attendees/Winners Included:

- Diego Verdaguer
- Dulce Maria
- Elvis Crespo
- Diana Reyes
- La Original Banda Limon
- El Trono de Mexico
- Lalo Mora &Lalo Mora Jr.
- La Leyenda
- La Maquinaria Norteña
- Frankie J
- Leonel Garcia
- Chingo Bling
- Fonseca
- Siggno
- 8 Segundos
- Las Fenix
- Fedro

=== 2011 ===
Hosted by: Marissa Del Portillo & Diego Shoenig

Attendees/Winners Included:

- Pedro Fernandez
- Shaila Durcal
- Duelo
- La Original Banda Limon
- Las Fenix
- Joey Montana
- Diana Reyes
- Michael Salgado
- Bobby Pulido
- Sunny Sauceda
- El Guero
- Dyland y Lenny
- Lidia Cavazos
- Siggno
- Liz Clapes
- FM5
- Don Tetto
- Herencia Tropical

=== 2010 ===
Hosted by: Jackie Guerrido & Raul Brindis

Attendees/Winners included:

- Aleks Syntek
- Chino y Nacho
- Ozomatli
- Edward James Olmos
- Bobby Pulido
- Christina Eustace
- Diana Reyes
- AJ Castillo
- Ana Isabelle
- Angel y Khriz
- El Guero y su banda Centenario
- Pee Wee
- Ruben Ramos
- Michael Salgado

Past winners of prestigious people’s choice awards include:

- Dulce Maria
- Rogelio Martinez
- Horoscopos de Durango
- Pablo Montero
- Bobby Pulido
- Kumbia All Starz
- Selena y Los Dinos
- La Mafia
- El Guero y Su Banda Centenario
- Emilio Navaira
- Ruben Ramos
- Kany Garcia
- DJ Flex
- Intocable
- Graciela Beltrán

== Lifetime achievement award ==
The following list includes past recipients of the grand award, Lifetime Achievement.
