= Rosie Rivera =

American TV personality

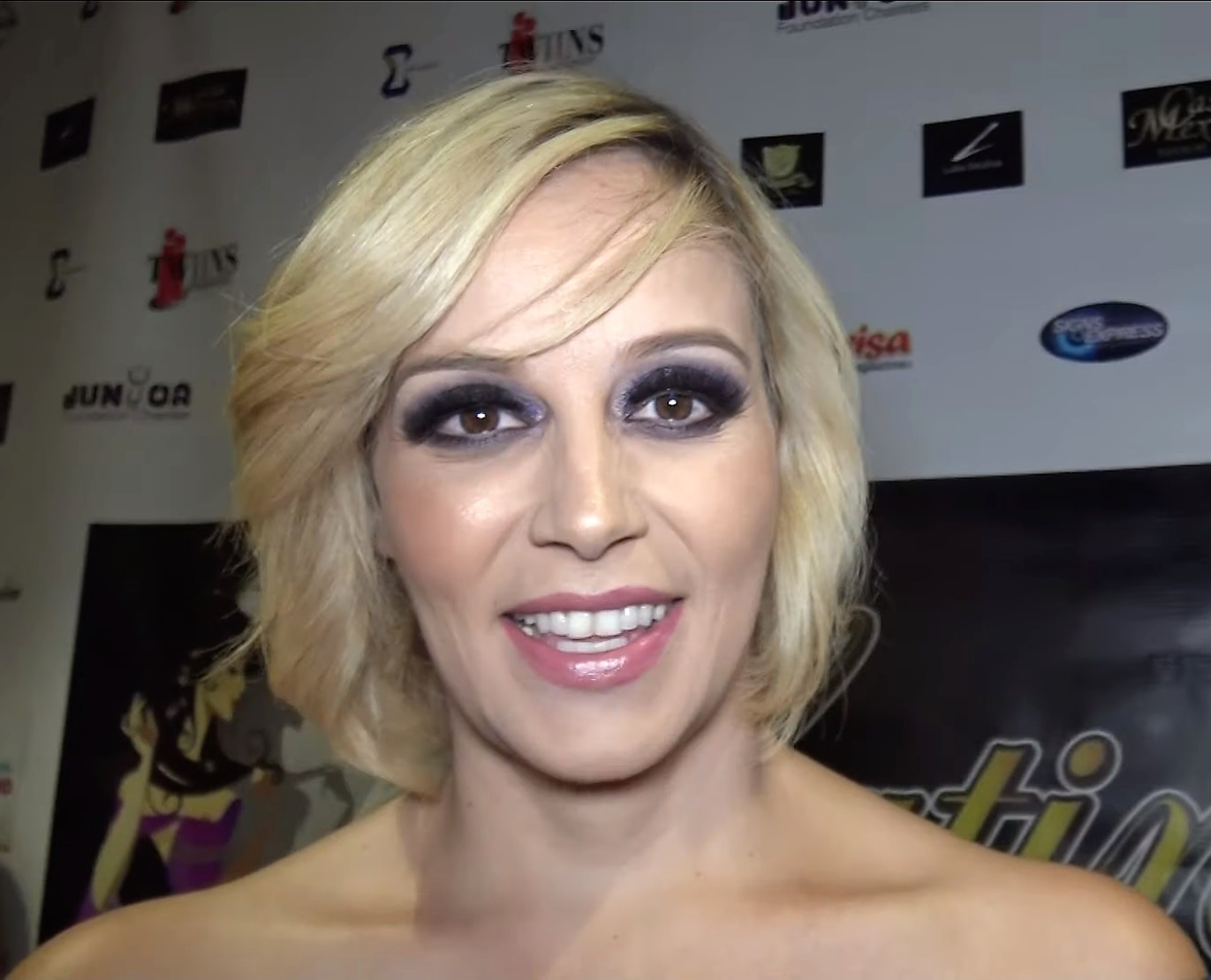
- Rivera interviewed by Dulce Osuna in 2016
- Born: Rosa Amelia Rivera; July 3, 1981 (age 43); Long Beach, California, U.S.
- Years active: 2013–present
- Television: I Love Jenni and Rica, Famosa, Latina
- Spouse: Abel Flores (m. 2011)
- Children: 3
- Relatives: Jenni Rivera (sister); Lupillo Rivera (brother); Juan Rivera (brother); Chiquis Rivera (niece)

Rosa Amelia Rivera (born July 3, 1981) is an American television personality. Rivera is the former chief executive officer of Jenni Rivera Enterprises. Rivera first gained media attention through her sister Jenni Rivera's death but she received wider notice after she began to star in Spanish-language reality shows and taking over her sister's enterprise. In late 2014, she and her family began to appear in the reality television series Rica, Famosa, Latina.

Rivera resigned from Jenni Rivera Enterprises in June 2021 after allegations of misappropriation of funds arose from Jenni Rivera's five children.

== Life and career ==
=== Early life ===
Rosie Rivera was born to parents Rosa Saavedra and Pedro Rivera. Rivera is the younger sister to Latin singers, Jenni Rivera (deceased), Lupillo Rivera and the aunt of singer Chiquis Rivera. Her other brothers are Pete Rivera, Gustavo Rivera, and Juan Rivera.

In 2003, she had daughter Kassandra with ex-boyfriend Chief. In 2011, she married Abel Flores. They have two children together: daughter Samantha Chay Flores (born 2013) and son Elias Melek Flores (born October 2015).

=== Career ===
In 2013, the third season of Jenni Rivera's reality show I Love Jenni aired. Rivera starred in the show, as she lived in her sister's house along with her family.

In late 2014, she and her family began to appear in the reality television series Rica, Famosa, Latina.

In February 2016, Rosie Rivera published her first book My Broken Pieces: Mending the Wounds From Sexual Abuse Through Faith, Family and Love that discusses her tragic, life-changing experience of sexual abuse at a young age, and shares her story on how faith and the love from her family helped her heal and mend those broken pieces. My Broken Pieces is Rivera's first book that set her free from the trauma and helped her strength while helping other victims of sexual abuse along the way. She is a spokesperson and role model for young women, who, like her, were victims of sexual abuse, and shares her story to uplift the pain and create strength in anyone who has been affected by sexual abuse.

== Filmography ==
Year	Title	Role	Notes
2012	I Love Jenni	herself	
2014/2018	Rica, Famosa y Latina	herself	
2024	Top Chef VIP	herself	Season 3
