= Canela TV =

- Country: Ecuador
- Broadcast area: Ecuador

Programming
- Picture format: 1080i HDTV

Ownership
- Owner: Telecanela

History
- Launched: June 12, 2010

Availability

Terrestrial
- Guayaquil: Channel 24
- Quito: Channel 44

Canela TV was a UHF television network in Ecuador owned by Telecanela. It was founded in 2010 and its slogan was El color del Ecuador.

== History ==
Telecanela was founded by the Canela Group, which obtained a law through loopholes set when Jorge Yunda was president of CONARTEL. Yunda was already the owner of Radio Canela, where he eventually started a Canela-branded media empire.

On September 20, 2018, ARCOTEL decided to close Canela's assets, including the TV station.

== Controversies ==
On September 24, 2014, the regulatory bodies informed Canela TV of possible discriminatory content against channel presenter Ángelo Barahona, presenter of Detectives de Famosos, a gossip show, regarding an edition broadcast on May 14 that year. A brief segment was analyzed where the presenter was changing his tone by saying terms such as "he's looking ugly at me, he discriminates me" or "he hates me". The incident happened during an interview to Brown City, a musical duo from Guayaquil.
