= Chiquis Rivera =

American singer (born 1985)

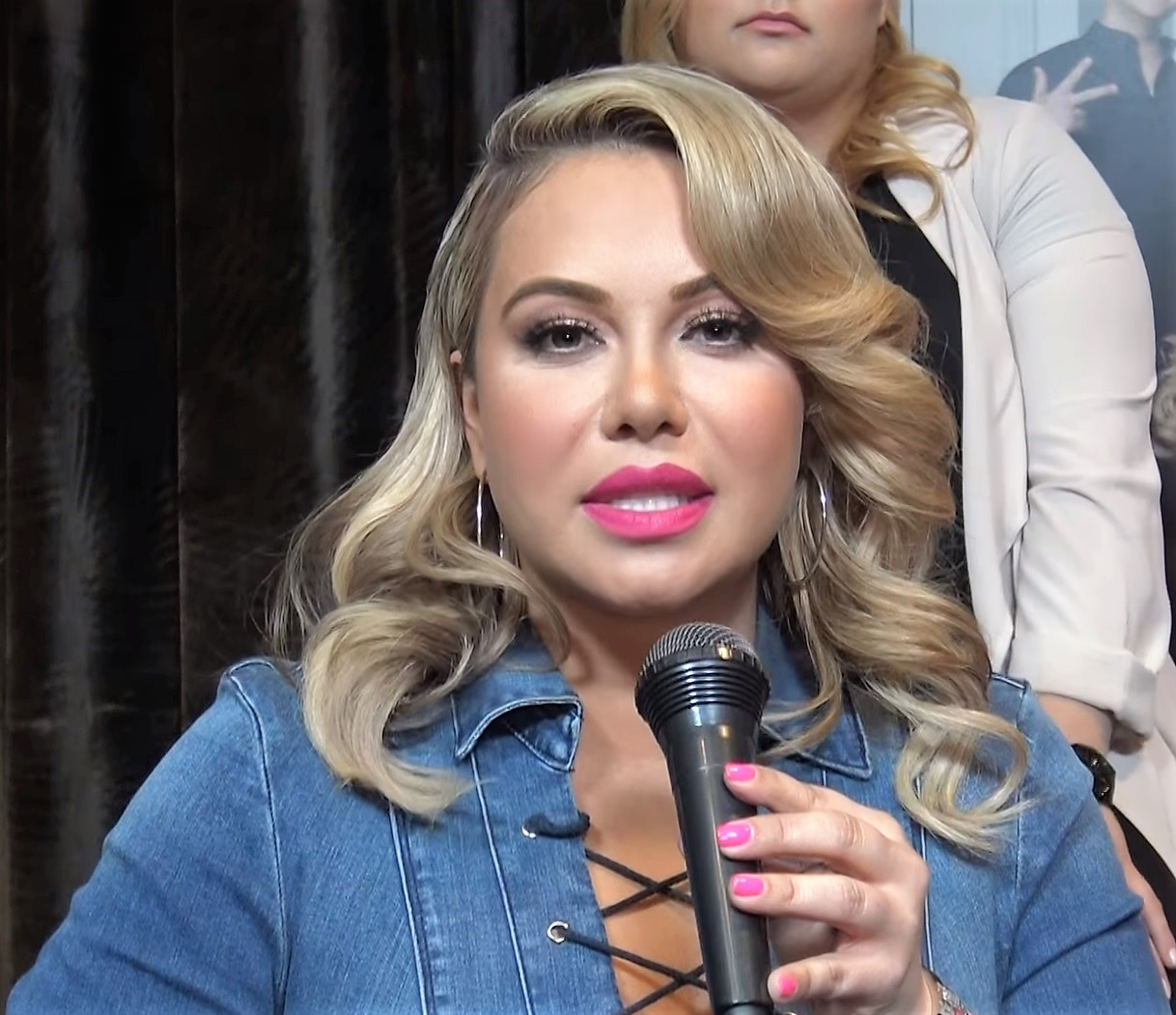
- Rivera in 2016
- Born: Janney Marin; June 26, 1985 (age 41); Los Angeles, California, U.S.
- Other names: Janney Marin Rivera; La Princesa de la Banda; La Necia; La Abeja Reina
- Occupations: Singer; television personality
- Years active: 1999–present
- Spouses: Lorenzo Méndez (m. 2019; div. 2020) Emilio Sanchez (m. 2024)
- Mother: Jenni Rivera
- Relatives: Lupillo Rivera (uncle); Juan Rivera (uncle); Rosie Rivera (aunt)
- Musical career
- Genres: Regional Mexican; Latin pop
- Instrument: Vocals
- Labels: Fonovisa; Sweet Sound
- Website: chiquismerch.com

Janney Marin (jay-née Marin; born June 26, 1985), known professionally as Chiquis Rivera, is an American singer and television personality. She is the eldest daughter of singer Jenni Rivera. She began her singing career in early 2014, releasing her first single "Paloma Blanca" as a tribute to her mother.

She made her television debut with her reality show Jenni Rivera Presents: Chiquis & Raq-C and also appeared on her mother's hit spin-off reality show I Love Jenni. Rivera's debut album, Ahora, was released on June 2, 2015. Her memoir, Forgiveness, was published on April 7, 2015, and its sequel, Unstoppable, on February 2, 2022.

Rivera is the recipient of three Latin Grammy Awards, two Lo Nuestro Awards, and two Grammy nominations.

== Life ==
Janney Marín Rivera was born and raised in California. She is daughter of regional Mexican star, Jenni Rivera and her first husband, José Trinidad Marín. She is the first child of both her parents, has one younger sister, Jacquelin, one brother, Mikey, and two half-siblings from her mother's second marriage. Rivera is Presbyterian and attends church regularly with her family.

=== Relationship with mother ===
On April 7, 2015, she released a memoir called Forgiveness, she revealed the reasons she and her mother, Jenni Rivera, stopped speaking in October 2012. She revealed that she was molested by a woman. She confirmed that the reason for her and her mother's separation stemmed from the rumor that she had an affair with Esteban Loaiza. She denied the rumor and attributes it to "toxic voices" that surrounded her mother at a time when she was deeply lonely and confused, leading her to doubt her then-husband's fidelity and her own daughter's loyalty. She stated, in an attempt to find evidence of incriminating behavior, that Rivera looked at video footage from her home's security system and found an instance in which Chiquis is seen leaving the master bedroom which Rivera shared with Loaiza while they were married. Chiquis said that Rivera became fixated with the video, and watched it so many times that she had made herself believe her daughter actually "came back to the house and snuck back into the bedroom" to have a sexual encounter with Loaiza. Beto Cuevas, who was friends with Jenni, has stated that he gave her advice on how to deal with the rift with Chiquis three days before Jenni's death.

=== Sexual abuse ===
In 1997, her aunt, Rosie Rivera came forward and confessed to Jenni Rivera, that José Trinidad Marín, used to sexually molest her, and was now doing the same to Chiquis. Physical examination showed he had done the same with her younger sister Jacqie Marín. The molestation case was opened in 1997 and Marín spent 9 years as a fugitive before he was apprehended in April 2006 and convicted of sexual assault and rape. In May 2007, José Trinidad Marín was found guilty of 7 out of 9 charges and sentenced to 30 years in prison without parole.

=== Mother's death ===
On 9 December 2012, her mother and six others died in a plane crash following a concert at the Monterrey Arena in Monterrey, Nuevo León. The plane was en route to Toluca for an appearance by Rivera on La Voz ... México.

=== Marriage ===
Chiquis married Lorenzo E. Méndez Ronquillo (former vocalist of La Original Banda El Limón) in June 2019 and became stepmother to Lorenzo's daughter from his previous marriage. On September 17, 2020, Rivera announced her divorce from Méndez through social media, claiming it a decision from both parties. Chiquis would later claim in her 2022 autobiography Unbreakable that Lorenzo was a drug addict with aggression issues, at one point spitting in her face and grabbing her by the neck, only stopping after her brother charged at him with a dumbbell. Chiquis Rivera got engaged to Emilio Sánchez in May 2023. A year later she married Emilio Sánchez on July 5, 2024 in Las Vegas. Amongst the invitees were Becky G.

=== Sexual orientation ===
In an interview in March 2023, Chiquis came out as bisexual. She also added that in her youth she had a girlfriend, but her mother forced her to end her relationship.

== Career ==
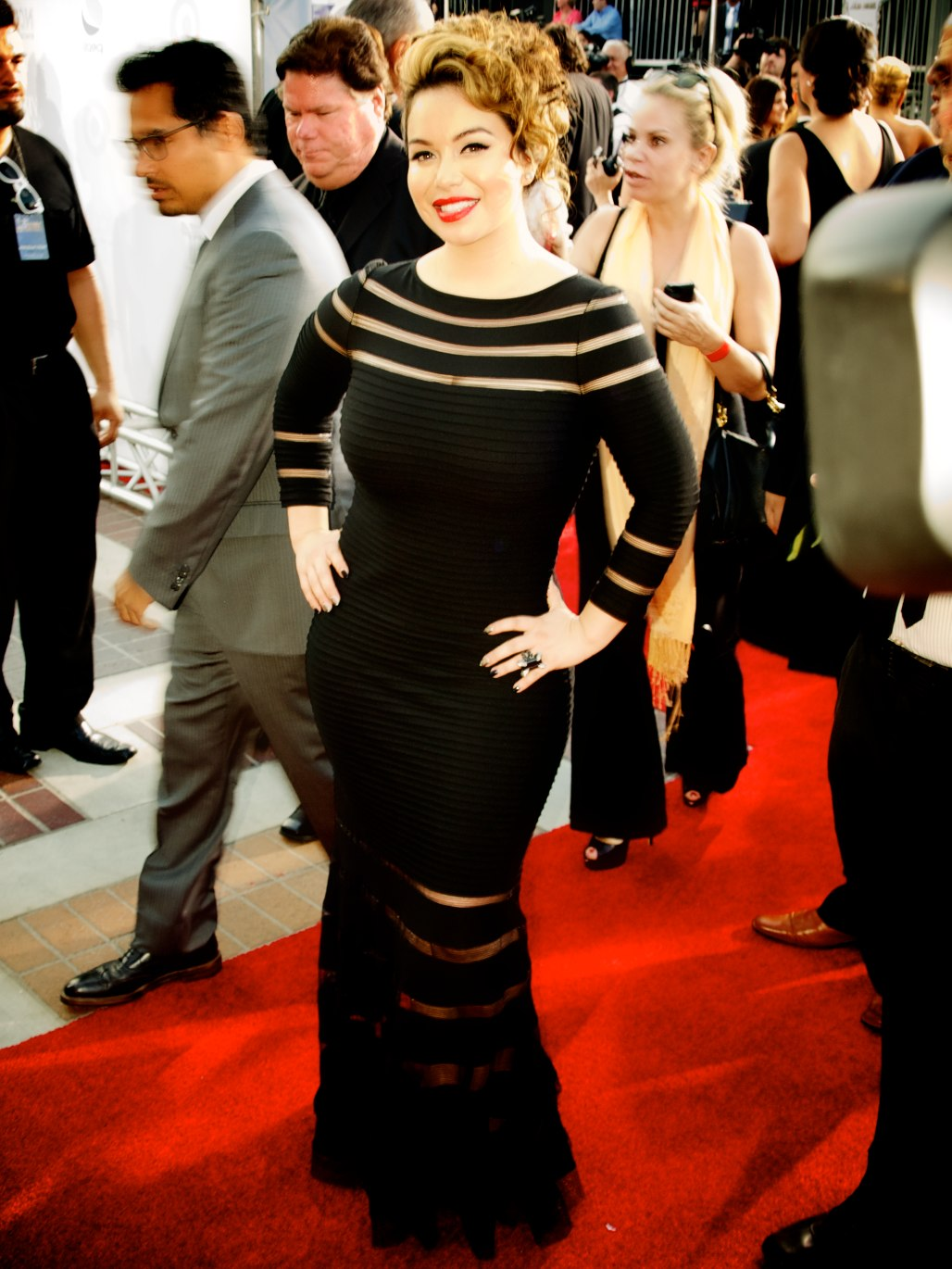
Rivera at the 2012 Alma Awards

=== Television personality ===
She made her television debut with her reality show Jenni Rivera Presents: Chiquis & Raq-C, Chiquis 'n Control, and also appeared on her mother's hit spin-off reality show I Love Jenni. She also starred in her mini web-series Chiquis Confidential. She and her siblings started in a spin-off of I Love Jenni called The Riveras. The series aired its fourth and final season on NBC Universo on August 11.

=== Singer ===
Rivera began her singing career in early 2014, releasing her first single "Paloma Blanca". It was written by her and dedicated as a tribute to her late mother. At Premios Juventud she made her musical debut on international television with her performance of "Esa No Soy Yo".

On April 6, 2015, Chiquis declared to the daily newspaper Miami Herald, she would be releasing an album called Ahora, on June 2, 2015. She stated, "I called it Ahora because it's about living in the moment and appreciating the now. I feel that's how my life can be summed up. It really has a little bit of everything – pop mixed with banda. I love all types of music and didn't want to limit myself since I am my own record label [Sweet Sound Records] I was able to take my time with it. I want to give that to people. I don't know anyone who listens to just one type of music – it's universal and brings everyone together."

In spring of 2018, Rivera released her second studio album titled 'Entre Botellas' which feature songs made with Lorenzo Mendez, Jenni Rivera and Juan Rivera. Her two singles 'Vas a Volver' and 'Horas Extras' were featured in the album as well as 'Quisieran Tener Mi Lugar', a duet sang with her mother Jenni Rivera.

== Artistry ==
=== Musical style ===
Rivera's musical style is classified as banda, a form of traditional Mexican music popular in Mexico and parts of the United States with large Mexican populations. Banda music originated in the state of Sinaloa and the music sound is primarily instruments such as tuba, clarinets and trumpets, i.e. Banda El Recodo and Banda La Costeña.

== Discography ==
- Ahora (2015)
- Entre Botellas (2018)
- Playlist (2020)
- Abeja Reina (2022)
- Bee Side (2023)
- Diamantes (2024)
- Diamantes VVS1 (2024)
- Flores En Mi Alma (2025)
- Janney (2026)

== Filmography ==
List of television credits
Year	Title	Role	Notes
2010	Jenni Rivera Presents: Chiquis & Raq-C	Herself	Mun2 reality show about her and her friend, Jenni Rivera appeared in and produced.
2011–2013	I Love Jenni	Herself	Mun2 reality show about her mother's life, Jenni Rivera produced.
2012	Chiquis n' Control	Herself	Mun2 reality show about her opening a blow-dry salon, Jenni Rivera appeared in and produced.
2016-2019	The Riveras	Herself	NBC Universo focusing on her and her siblings after Jenni Rivera's death.
2019-2021	Tengo Talento Mucho Talento	Judge	Estrella TV competition show searching for the best Latino talent in the United States.
2021-2022	Lo Mejor de Ti con Chiquis	Host	NBC Universo lifestyle show, Chqiuis leads physical and emotional makeovers for a group of nominated guests.
2024	La Academia	Judge	Mexican musical competition series
2024	Chiquis Sin Filtro	Herself	Vix docuseries
2025	Foodie On The Go	Herself	LatiNation food & travel series

== Awards and nominations ==
=== Billboard Latin Music Awards ===
The Billboard Latin Music Awards are awarded annually by Billboard magazine in the United States. The Billboard awards are the Latin music industry's longest running and most prestigious award. Chiquis has received two nominations.

Year	Nominee / work	Award	Result
2015	Herself	Hot Latin Songs Artist of the Year, Female	Nominated
2016	Herself	Regional Mexican Albums Artist of the Year, Solo	Nominated

=== Grammy Awards ===
The Grammy Awards are awarded annually by The Recording Academy. Chiquis has received two nominations.

Year	Nominee / work	Award	Result
2023	Abeja Reina	Best Regional Mexican Music Album (including Tejano)	Nominated
2025	Diamantes	Best Regional Mexican Music Album (including Tejano)	Nominated

=== Juventud Awards ===
The Juventud Awards are awarded annually by the television network Univision in the United States. Chiquis has received eight nominations.

Year	Nominee / work	Award	Result
2014	Paloma Blanca	Catchiest Tune	Nominated
2014	Paloma Blanca	My Favorite Video	Nominated
2014	Herself	Best Artist using Social Media to Connect with Fans	Nominated
2019	Herself	Best Social Artist	Nominated
2019	Herself	Best Scroll Stopper	Nominated
2019	Chiquis Rivera and Lorenzo Méndez	Best Couple	Nominated
2020	Herself	Breaking the Internet	Nominated
2021	Herself	Female Youth Artist of the Year	Nominated

=== Latin American Music Awards ===
The Latin American Music Awards are the Spanish-language version of the American Music Awards hosted on U.S. Spanish-language television network, Telemundo.

Year	Nominee / work	Award	Result
2015	Herself	New Artist of the Year	Nominated
2015	Herself	Favorite Female Artist	Nominated
2022	Herself	Social Artist of the Year	Nominated

=== Latin Grammy Awards ===
The Latin Grammy Awards are awarded annually by The Latin Recording Academy in the United States. Rivera has received three awards.

Year	Nominee / work	Award	Result
2020	Playlist	Best Banda Album	Won
2022	Abeja Reina	Best Banda Album	Won
2024	Diamantes	Best Banda Album	Won

=== Lo Nuestro Awards ===
The Lo Nuestro Awards are awarded annually by the television network Univision in the United States.

Year	Nominee / work	Award	Result
2015	Herself	Regional Mexican: Female Artist of the Year	Nominated
2016	Herself	Regional Mexican: Female Artist of the Year	Won
2017	Herself	Female Artist of the Year	Won
2020	Herself	Social Artist of the Year	Nominated
2021	Herself	Regional Mexican Artist of the Year	Nominated
2023	Herself	Female Regional Mexican Artist of the Year	Pending
2023	Abeja Reina	Regional Mexican Album of the Year	Pending
2023	Mi Problema	Regional Mexican Song of the Year	Pending
2023	Quiero Amanecer Con Alguien	Banda Song of the Year	Pending
2023	Baila Así	Urban Dance/Pop Song of the Year	Pending
2025	Herself	Female Artist of the Year	Pending

=== Premios De La Radio ===
The Premios De La Radio are awarded annually by the television network Estrella TV in the United States for the Regional Mexican Music genre. Chiquis has received one nomination, and in 2014 she lost the award to her late mother Jenni Rivera.

Year	Nominee / work	Award	Result
2014	Herself	Female Artist of the Year	Nominated
2015	Herself	Female Artist of the Year	Won
2022	Herself	Female Artist of the Year	Nominated

=== Tu Mundo Awards ===
The Tu Mundo Awards are produced by Telemundo awarded annually from the American Airlines Arena in Miami, Florida.

Year	Nominee / work	Award	Result
2014	#BossBee	Fan Club of the Year	Nominated
