= Olga Tañón discography =

List of Olga Tañon's albums

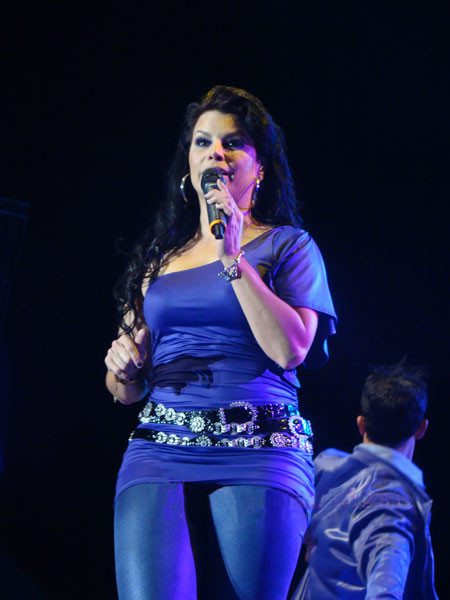
- Olga Tañón during a live performance
- Studio albums: 14
- Extended plays: 1
- Live albums: 3
- Singles: 48
- Video albums: 2
- Music videos: 72

Puerto Rican singer and songwriter Olga Tañón has released fourteen studio albums, one EP album, three live albums, six greatest hits albums, two video albums and 72 music videos. She's known as "La Mujer de Fuego" (the woman of fire) for her electrifying stage performances and has received two Guinness World Records for being the tropical female artist with the most top 10 singles and the most awarded artist in the history of the Premio Lo Nuestro awards.

Tañón came to prominence following the release of her debut studio album Sola (1992), her follow-up studio albums throughout the 1990s and 2000s led her to be one of the top selling female artist in the Tropical genre with estimated worldwide sales of 2 million albums. With multiple #1 albums and singles on the Billboard Latin charts, in addition to numerous top 10 hit singles, her contributions to the music industry have garnered her numerous achievements including two Grammy Awards, four Latin Grammy Awards, five Billboard Latin Music Awards and thirty Premio Lo Nuestro Awards.

== Albums ==
=== Studio ===
Year	Album	Billboard charts		Certification and sales
Year	Album	Top Latin Albums	Billboard 200	Certification and sales
1992	Sola: First studio album; Released: May 12, 1992; Label: WEA Latina; Formats: CD, cassette	—	—	
1993	Mujer de Fuego: Second studio album; Released: August 10, 1993	28	—	
1994	Siente el Amor: Third studio album; Released: October 25, 1994	5	—	
1996	Nuevos Senderos: Fourth studio album; Released: April 16, 1996	2	170	RIAA: Gold
1997	Llévame Contigo: Fifth studio album; Released: May 6, 1997	1	175	
1998	Te Acordarás de Mí: Sixth studio album; Released: October 27, 1998	1	111	RIAA: 2× Platinum (Latin)
2001	Yo por Ti: Seventh studio album; Released: July 17, 2001	4	—	RIAA: Platinum (Latin)
2002	Sobrevivir: Eighth studio album; Released: November 19, 2002	11	—	RIAA: Platinum (Latin)
2005	Una Nueva Mujer: Ninth studio album; Released: April 19, 2005	5	196	RIAA: Platinum (Latin)
2006	Soy Como Tú: Tenth studio album; Released: October 10, 2006	5	126	RIAA: Gold (Latin)
2007	Éxitos en 2 Tiempos: Eleventh studio album; Released: November 20, 2007	10	—	RIAA: Gold (Latin)
2011	Ni una Lágrima Más: Twelfth studio album; Released: April 26, 2011	15	—	
2013	Una Mujer: Thirteenth studio album; Released: July 30, 2013	6	—	
2017	Olga Tañón y Punto: Fourteenth studio album; Released: May 12, 2017	—	—	

=== EP ===
Year	Album	Billboard Charts		Certification and Sales
Year	Album	Top Latin Albums	Billboard 200	Certification and Sales
2009	4/13: First EP album; Released: November 10, 2009	20	—	

=== Live ===
Year	Album	Billboard charts		Certification and sales
Year	Album	Top Latin Albums	Billboard 200	Certification and sales
1999	Olga Viva, Viva Olga: First live album; Released: November 16, 1999	6	—	RIAA: Platinum (Latin)
2008	Fuego en Vivo, Vol. 1: Second live album; Released: December 9, 2008	22	—	
2008	Fuego en Vivo, Vol. 2: Third live album; Released: December 9, 2008	20	—	

=== Greatest Hits ===
Year	Album	Billboard charts		Certification and sales
Year	Album	Top Latin Albums	Billboard 200	Certification and sales
1995	Éxitos y Más: First greatest hits album; Released: December 5, 1995	9	—	
2003	A Puro Fuego: Second greatest hits album; Released: August 26, 2003	23	—	
2005	Cómo Olvidar... Lo Mejor de Olga Tañón: Third greatest hits album; Released: March 29, 2005	64	—	
2006	100% Merengue: Fourth greatest hits album; Released: April 4, 2006	—	—	
2009	25 Éxitos de Fuego, Vol. 1: Fifth greatest hits album; Released: June 23, 2009	—	—	
2009	25 Éxitos de Fuego, Vol. 2: Sixth greatest hits album; Released: June 23, 2009	—	—	

== Singles ==
=== Lead Artist ===
Year	Single	Billboard charts			Album
Year	Single	Hot Latin Songs	Latin Pop Songs	Tropical Songs	Album
1993	"Una Mujer Rota"	19	—	—	Sola
1993	"Contigo o Sin Ti"	20	—	—	Mujer de Fuego
1994	"Muchacho Malo"	24	—	—	Mujer de Fuego
1994	"Vendrás Llorando"	27	—	—	Mujer de Fuego
1994	"Presencié Tu Amor"	9	—	—	Mujer de Fuego
1994	"No Me Puedes Pedir"	25	—	—	Mujer de Fuego
1994	"Receta de Amor"	30	7	7	Siente el Amor
1994	"Es Mentiroso"	23	12	2	Siente el Amor
1995	"Entre la Noche y el Día"	9	4	5	Siente el Amor
1995	"Ya Me Cansé"	21	34	2	Siente el Amor
1995	"Aún Pienso en Ti"	28	—	3	Siente el Amor
1995	"Una Noche Más"	31	—	5	Siente el Amor
1996	"Basta Ya"	1	1	4	Nuevos Senderos
1996	"Me Subes, Me Bajas, Me Subes"	3	2	8	Nuevos Senderos
1996	"Mi Eterno Amor Secreto"	21	8	—	Nuevos Senderos
1997	"En Ti"	34	14	—	Nuevos Senderos
1997	"Serpiente Mala"	9	5	2	Llévame Contigo
1997	"Porque No Te Encontré"	35	—	3	Llévame Contigo
1997	"Llegó el Amor"	22	19	8	Llévame Contigo
1998	"El Frío de Tu Adios"	4	10	1	Llévame Contigo
1998	"Así Es el Amor"	34	—	12	Llévame Contigo
1998	"Tu Amor"	4	4	5	Te Acordarás de Mí
1999	"Escondidos" (feat. Cristian Castro)	4	2	—	Te Acordarás de Mí
1999	"Engáñame"	35	—	—	Te Acordarás de Mí
1999	"Hielo y Fuego"	23	19	28	Te Acordarás de Mí
2001	"Cómo Olvídar"	1	2	1	Yo por Ti
2002	"Miénteme"	18	12	8	Yo por Ti
2002	"Ahora Soy Mala"	—	—	14	Yo por Ti
2003	"Así Es la Vida"	1	2	2	Sobrevivir
2003	"No Podrás"	10	16	5	Sobrevivir
2003	"Cuando Tú No Estás"	34	31	10	A Puro Fuego
2005	"Bandolero"	6	7	3	Una Nueva Mujer
2005	"Vete Vete"	15	11	9	Una Nueva Mujer
2006	"Desilusióname"	4	9	31	Soy Como Tú
2007	"Flaca o Gordita"	34	15	21	Soy Como Tú
2008	"Hoy Quiero Confesarme"	35	19	—	Éxitos en 2 Tiempos
2008	"Cosas del Amor"	48	20	—	Éxitos en 2 Tiempos
2009	"Amor Entre Tres"	—	37	—	4/13
2009	"Pasión Morena"	—	38	25	4/13
2009	"Navidad Boricua"	—	—	14	4/13
2010	"Ni una Lágrima Más" (feat. Samo)	—	—	33	Ni una Lágrima Más
2011	"You Need to Know"	—	—	7	Ni una Lágrima Más
2012	"Todo Lo Que Sube y Baja"	—	—	23	Una Mujer
2012	"Mala"	—	—	21	Una Mujer
2013	"Una Mujer Como Yo" (feat. Maffio)	—	—	13	Una Mujer
2014	"A Celebrar" (feat. Elvis Crespo)	—	—	18	Una Mujer
2015	"Vivo la Vida"	—	—	24	Olga Tañón y Punto
2017	"Así Es el Amor" (feat. Wisin)	—	23	6	Olga Tañón y Punto

=== Featured Artist ===
Year	Single	Billboard charts			Album
Year	Single	Hot Latin Songs	Latin Pop Songs	Tropical Songs	Album
2002	"Ah Ya Albi"; Hakim (featuring Olga Tañón)	—	—	—	Talakik
2005	"Ay Dios"; Franco de Vita (featuring Olga Tañón)	—	29	—	Stop
2010	"Carita Linda"; Grupo Manía (featuring Olga Tañón)	—	33	7	Se Pegó la Manía
2014	"El Masal El Aasal - Ya Aasal (المثل - العسل) (يا عسل)"; Samo Zaen (featuring Olga Tañón)	—	—	—	Zay Ay Etnen

== Videography ==
=== Video albums ===
Title	Video details
Olga Viva, Viva Olga	Released: December 14, 1999; Label: Warner Music Latina; Format: DVD, VHS
Éxitos en Video	Released: November 19, 2002; Label: Warner Music Latina; Format: DVD

=== Music videos ===
Year	Title	Album
1994	"Vendrás Llorando"	Sola
1994	"Presencié Tu Amor"	Sola
1995	"Entre la Noche y el Día"	Siente el Amor
1996	"Basta Ya"	Nuevos Senderos
1996	"Me Subes, Me Bajas, Me Subes"	Nuevos Senderos
1997	"Llegó el Amor"	Llévame Contigo
1998	"Tu Amor"	Llévame Contigo
1999	"Engáñame"	Te Acordarás de Mí
1999	"Hielo y Fuego"	Te Acordarás de Mí
2001	"Cómo Olvidar" (ballad version)	Yo por Ti
2001	"Cómo Olvidar" (merengue version)	Yo por Ti
2001	"Miénteme"	Yo por Ti
2003	"Así Es la Vida"	Sobrevivir
2003	"Cuando Tú No Estás"	A Puro Fuego
2005	"Bandolero" (pop version)	Una Nueva Mujer
2005	"Bandolero" (reggaeton version)	Una Nueva Mujer
2005	"Vete Vete"	Una Nueva Mujer
2006	"María"	Soy Como Tú
2006	"Desilusióname"	Soy Como Tú
2008	"Hoy Quiero Confesarme"	Éxitos en 2 Tiempos
2011	"Sola"	Ni una Lágrima Más
2013	"Una Mujer Como Yo" (lyric video)	Una Mujer
2014	"A Celebrar" (lyric video) (with Elvis Crespo)	Una Mujer
2015	"Vivo la Vida"	Olga Tañón y Punto
2015	"Tú Eres la Razón" (with Descemer Bueno and Qva Libre)	non-album
2017	"Así Es el Amor" (lyric video) (with Wisin)	Olga Tañón y Punto
2017	"La Gran Fiesta"	Olga Tañón y Punto
2018	"Como en Las Vegas" (with Chyno Miranda)	non-album
2018	"Todo Pasará" (with Abraham Velázquez and Alex Zurdo)	non-album
2018	"Lo Que Está Pa' Ti"	non-album
2019	"Mi Corazón Es Tuyo" (with Manny Manuel)	non-album
2020	"Alexa" (2 versions)	non-album
2020	"Flaca o Gordita" (lyric video) (ranchera-pop version)	non-album
2020	"Esta Loca"	non-album
2020	"Cómo Olvidar - Versión 2021" (with Jay Wheeler)	non-album
2021	"Te Llamo"	Senderos de Amor
2021	"Te Llamo - Regional Mexicano"	Senderos de Amor
2021	"Jala Jala Remix" (with Jon Z)	non-album
2022	"Ojalá Remix" (with Nacho)	non-album
2022	"Vuela Muy Alto"	non-album
2022	"Tú Me Quemas"	Canciones del Corazón
2022	"Nunca"	Canciones del Corazón
2022	"Es Mentiroso (Nueva Versión 2022)"	non-album
2022	"Dos Locos" (with Ala Jaza)	Canciones del Corazón
2022	"Tu Cariñito"	non-album
2022	"Tu Cariñito Remix" (with Puerto Rican Power)	Canciones del Corazón
2022	"Los Celos Se Te Notan"	Tañón con Más Power
2023	"Tesoro Mío" (with Yan Collazo)	Tañón con Más Power
2023	"Perro Arrepentido"	Tañón con Más Power
2023	"Ganas - Versión Merengue"	Tañón con Más Power
2024	"Que Se Mueran de Celos"	non-album
2024	"Que Se Mueran de Celos (Versión Bachata)" (lyric video)	non-album
2024	"Así Yo Soy"	Así Yo Soy
2024	"No Sé Quién Soy" (with Lenier)	Así Yo Soy
2024	"Vamos a Ser Feliz" (with Christian Alicea)	Así Yo Soy
2024	"Pasarla Bonito" (with Elder Dayán Díaz)	Así Yo Soy
2024	"Lluvia"	non-album
2024	"Tú Quieres Que Contigo Yo Me Vaya" (lyric video)	non-album
2024	"Ojalá"	non-album
2024	"Por Si Te Me Vas" (with Billy Denizard)	non-album
2024	"El Reclamo - Bachata"	non-album
2024	"El Reclamo - Balada"	non-album
2025	"Sin Ti" (lyric video) (with Samo)	non-album
2025	"PR24SIETE" (lyric video)	PR24SIETE Soy de Aquí
2025	"QUIERO A MI PUEBLO" (lyric video) (with Genio La Musa)	PR24SIETE Soy de Aquí
2025	"MAÑANA POR LA MAÑANA" (lyric video)	PR24SIETE Soy de Aquí
2025	"YO ME TOMO EL RON" (lyric video)	PR24SIETE Soy de Aquí
2025	"EL JOLGORIO" (lyric video)	PR24SIETE Soy de Aquí
2025	"A QUIÉN NO LE GUSTA ESO" (lyric video)	PR24SIETE Soy de Aquí
2025	"SI NO ME DAN DE BEBER" (lyric video)	PR24SIETE Soy de Aquí
2025	"TANTA VANIDAD" (lyric video)	PR24SIETE Soy de Aquí

== Awards ==
=== Grammy Awards ===
Year	Category	Album or song	Result
1997	Best Tropical Latin Performance	Llévame Contigo	Nominated
2000	Best Merengue Album	Olga Viva, Viva Olga	Won
2001	Best Merengue Album	Yo Por Ti	Won

=== Latin Grammy Awards ===
Year	Category	Album or song	Result
2000	Best Merengue Performance	Olga Viva, Viva Olga	Nominated
2002	Best Merengue Album	Yo Por Ti	Won
2003	Best Female Pop Vocal Album	Sobrevivir	Won
2006	Best Contemporary Tropical Album	Una Nueva Mujer	Won
2008	Best Contemporary Tropical Album	Exitos en 2 Tiempos	Nominated
2017	Best Tropical Fusion Album	Olga Tañón y Punto	Won
