= Dániel Garas =

Hungarian cinematographer

Dániel Garas (born 23 February 1973 in Budapest, Hungary) is a Hungarian cinematographer, and director of photography. He graduated from the Hungarian University of Art and Design, Budapest as a photographer and at the Academy of Drama and Film, Budapest as a cinematographer.

== List of works ==
- Feature films

1999 • Portugal • directed by Andor Lukáts, produced by György Budai

2000 • Moscow Square • directed by Ferenc Török, produced by Sándor Simó (Hunnia Filmstúdió)

2003 • Love Till Last Blood • directed by György Dobrai, produced by Gábor Varga (Film Plus)

2004 • Eastern Sugar • directed by Ferenc Török, produced by László Kántor (Új Budapest Filmstúdió)

2006 • Overnight • directed by Ferenc Török, produced by Iván Angelusz (Katapult Film/Filmpartners)

2007 • Mázli • directed by Tamás Keményffy, produced by Dalma Hidasi (Extreme Film)

- Short films

1999 • Transit • directed by Ferenc Török

2003 • Shoes • directed by Ferenc Török

2005 • Beautiful Wild Animals • directed by Ferenc Török

2005 • Live • directed by Gábor Fabriciusz

2005 • Cokie • directed by László Kollár

2005 • Paul Street Boys • directed by Ferenc Török

2006 • Sekh Mohamed Poem • directed by Ahmed Aldogajie

- Music videos

2000 • Budapest • Zséda, Dopeman, Majka

2000 • Budapest • Bëlga, Žagar

2004 • Beirut • Fadl Shakeer, Wael Kfonni, Ramy Ayach, Wallid Tufic • directed by Said El Maoruk, produced by Rotana

2004 • Beirut • Samo Zaen, Madelen, Elissa, Fadl and Shareen • directed by Said El Maoruk, produced by Rotana

2005 • Beirut • Rashed al Majed • directed by Ahmed Dajabi, produced by Rotana

- Commercials

2002-2005 • Budapest • OTP Bank, HVB Bank, Aegon Bank, Nestle, Vodafone, T-Mobile, T-Online, Daewoo, Pepsi

2005 • Beirut • Merchef, Lipton
