= Gábor T. Szántó =

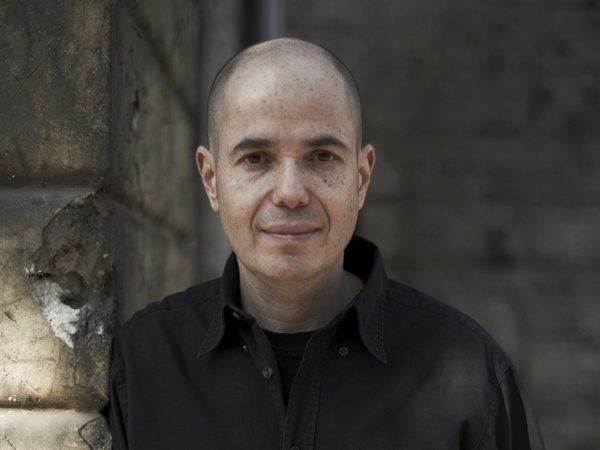
Szántó T. Gábor, Hungarian writer, poet, journalist and essayist

Gábor T. Szántó is a Hungarian novelist, screenwriter, poet, essayist and editor.

== Early life and education ==
Gábor T. Szántó was born in Budapest, Hungary.

He studied law and political science and graduated from Eötvös Loránd University in Budapest.

He has been a participant in the Iowa International Writing Program Residency in the United States (2003).

Szántó is the editor-in-chief of the Hungarian Jewish monthly Szombat. His additional field of interest is researching and teaching Modern Jewish Literature.

== Career ==
Szántó published a volume of two novellas, Mószer (The Informer) in 1997, and a novel in 2002, Keleti pályadvar, végállomas (Eastern Station, Last Stop). His short story book Lágermikulás (The Crunch of Empty Boots) was published in 2004 followed by a collection of poems A szabadulás íze (The Taste of Escape) in 2010. His novel, Édeshármas (Threesome) appeared in 2012, his novel Kafka macskái (Kafka's Cats) in 2014, a volume of short stories 1945 és más történetek, (1945 and Other Stories) in 2017, and a novel Európa szimfónia (Europa Symphony) (2019). His novel entitled A jazzprofesszor (The Jazzprofessor) has been published in 2024 , Kafka sírja (Kafa's Grave) in 2025 and a short story book Nem alszik, nem szunnyad (Neither Sleep, Nor Slumber) in 2026.

His novella, Mószer appeared in German as In Schuld verstrickt (Edition Q, 1999). A volume of short stories (Обратный билет – Obratnij Bilet) came out in Russian at Text Publisher, 2008. His novel Kafka’s Cats was published in Turkey as Kafka’nın Kedileri (2018), in Czech as Kafkovy Kočky (2020), his short story book as 1945 e altre storie (2021) in Italy, as 1945 a iné príbehy (2022) in Slovak, as 1945 and Other Stories (2024) in English, and as 1945 ja muita kertomuksia in Finland. The volume has been published in China in 2023. His novel Europa Symphony has been published in Bulgaria in 2022 as Симфония Европа in Turkey in 2023 as Avrupa Senfonisi, in Finland as Eurooppa-Sinfonia and forthcoming in Croatian in 2027. His novel Eastern Station, Last Stop has been published in Romania as Gara de est, cap de linie in 2023 and forthcoming in Slovak in 2026.

The title story of his book 1945 és más történetek (2017) was translated into English as 1945 (Homecoming), German, French, Spanish, Russian, Dutch, Finnish, Italian, Polish, Slovakian, Slovenian and Chinese and served as the basis of the internationally acclaimed film 1945 directed by Hungarian film director Ferenc Török was shot in production Katapultfilm. Cameraman: Elemér Ragályi, music: Tibor Szemző. The film is distributed in 40 countries.

== Awards ==
- - Miami Jewish Film Festival, Best Narrative, 2017
- - 67th Berlin International Film Festival Panorama section, 3rd place Audience Award Fiction Film, 2017
- - Titanic International Film Festival, Budapest, Audience Award, 2017
- - Washington Jewish Film Festival, Audience Award, 2017
- - Chattanooga Jewish Film Festival, Audience Award, 2017
- - Berlin Jewish Film Festival, Best Directed Film, 2017
- - 34th Jerusalem Film Festival, Yad Vashem Avner Shalev Prize for best artistic representation of Holocaust related topic, 2017
- - 37th San Francisco Jewish Film Festival, San Francisco Critics Circle Award and Audience Award, 2017
- - 30th Der neue Heimatfilm, Freistadt, Austria, Best Fiction Film, 2017
- - Central European Film Festival, Timișoara, Romania, Best Film, 2017
- - 19th Film by the Sea International Film Festival on Film and Literature, Vlissingen, The Netherlands, Main Prize
- - Vienna Jewish Film Festival Audience Award, 2017
- - Waterloo Historical Film Festival, Critic's Prize, 2017
- - Warshaw Jewish Film Festival, Best Screenplay Award and Audience Award, 2017
- - Australian Jewish International Film Festival Audience Award for Best Feature Film, 2017
- - Main Prize of the Hungarian Film Critics, 2018
- - 14. Jewish Motifs International Film Festival, Warshaw, Audience Award, 2018
- - Traverse City Film Festival, 2018, Prize of Best Foreign Film
