= ¡Basta Ya! (song) =

1996 single by Olga Tañón

Single by Olga Tañón

from the album Nuevos Senderos
- Released: 1996
- Recorded: 1995
- Studio: Marco Musical Estudio, Mexico City, Mexico
- Length: 4:20
- Label: WEA Latina
- Songwriter: Marco Antonio Solís
- Producer: Marco Antonio Solís

Olga Tañón singles chronology
"Una Noche Más" (1995)	"¡Basta Ya!" (1996)	"Me Subes, Me Bajas, Me Subes" (1996)

Music video
- "Basta Ya" on YouTube

"¡Basta Ya!" (English: "Enough!") is a song by Puerto Rican singer Olga Tañón from her fourth studio album, Nuevos Senderos (1996). The song was written and produced by Marco Antonio Solís. It was released as the lead single from the album in 1996. "A ballad, the song is about unrequited love and marked a musical departure from Tañón's merengue recordings. The song was nominated for Pop Song of the Year at the 1997 Lo Nuestro Awards. Commercially, it topped both the Billboard Hot Latin Songs and Latin Pop Airplay charts in the United States. A music video for the song was filmed and features a couple's failing relationship.

"¡Basta Ya!" was later covered by both Conjunto Primavera in 2007 and by American singer Jenni Rivera. Conjunto Primavera's version also topped the Hot Latin Songs chart as well as the Regional Mexican Airplay chart in the US. Rivera recorded a pop and banda rendition of the song for her 12th and final studio albums, Joyas Prestadas (2011) with Solís performing alongside her. She recorded a music video for her cover in Los Angeles, California. In Mexico, her version topped the Monitor Latino chart and reached three on the Billboard Mexican Airplay, while it peaked at number 14 and number six on the Hot Latin Songs and Regional Mexican Airplay charts in the US, respectively. Solís was presented with the ASCAP Latin Award in both 2008 and 2012 for the respective cover versions.

== Background and composition ==
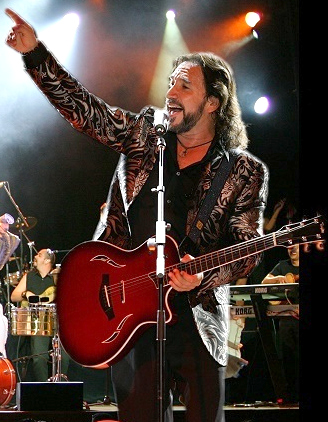
Marco Antonio Solís (pictured) composed and produced "¡Basta Ya" for Olga Tañón's studio album Nuevos Senderos; Solís would later provide his vocals for Jenni Rivera's cover in 2011.

Since 1992, Tañón launched her solo career as a merengue singer. She released three studio albums: Sola (1992), Mujer de Fuego (1993), Siente el Amor (1994), the latter of which became the most successful, reaching the top five on the Billboard Top Latin Albums chart in the United States. In November 1995, Tañón announced that she had finished recording an album of ballads with Mexican singer-songwriter Marco Antonio Solís, the former lead vocalist of Los Bukis, producing it and composing all but one of the tracks. The album's title, Nuevos Senderos, was announced a month later. According to Tañón, she wanted to record an album of ballads because of her originally performing under that genre prior to singing merengue as well as a desire to collaborate with Solís. Nuevos Senderos was recorded in Solís's recording studio, Marco Musical Estudio, in Mexico City, Mexico, and released in April 1996. One of the songs Solís wrote and composed for the album was "¡Basta Ya!", a ballad that tells of a "soaring story of unrequited love".

== Promotion and reception ==
"¡Basta Ya!" was released as the lead single from the album in 1996. A music video was made for the song, which shows a couple's relationship deteriorating before the lead actress leaves her lover. The Dallas Morning News critic Mario Tarradell felt that the song "summarizes" Tañón's "creative departure in four minutes". At the 9th Annual Lo Nuestro Awards in 1997, it was nominated in the category of Pop Song of the Year, but lost to "Experiencia Religiosa" by Enrique Iglesias. A live version of the track was recorded for Tañón's album Olga Viva, Viva Olga (1999). In the US, "¡Basta Ya!" reached the top of the Billboard Hot Latin Songs and Latin Pop Airplay charts.

== Cover versions ==
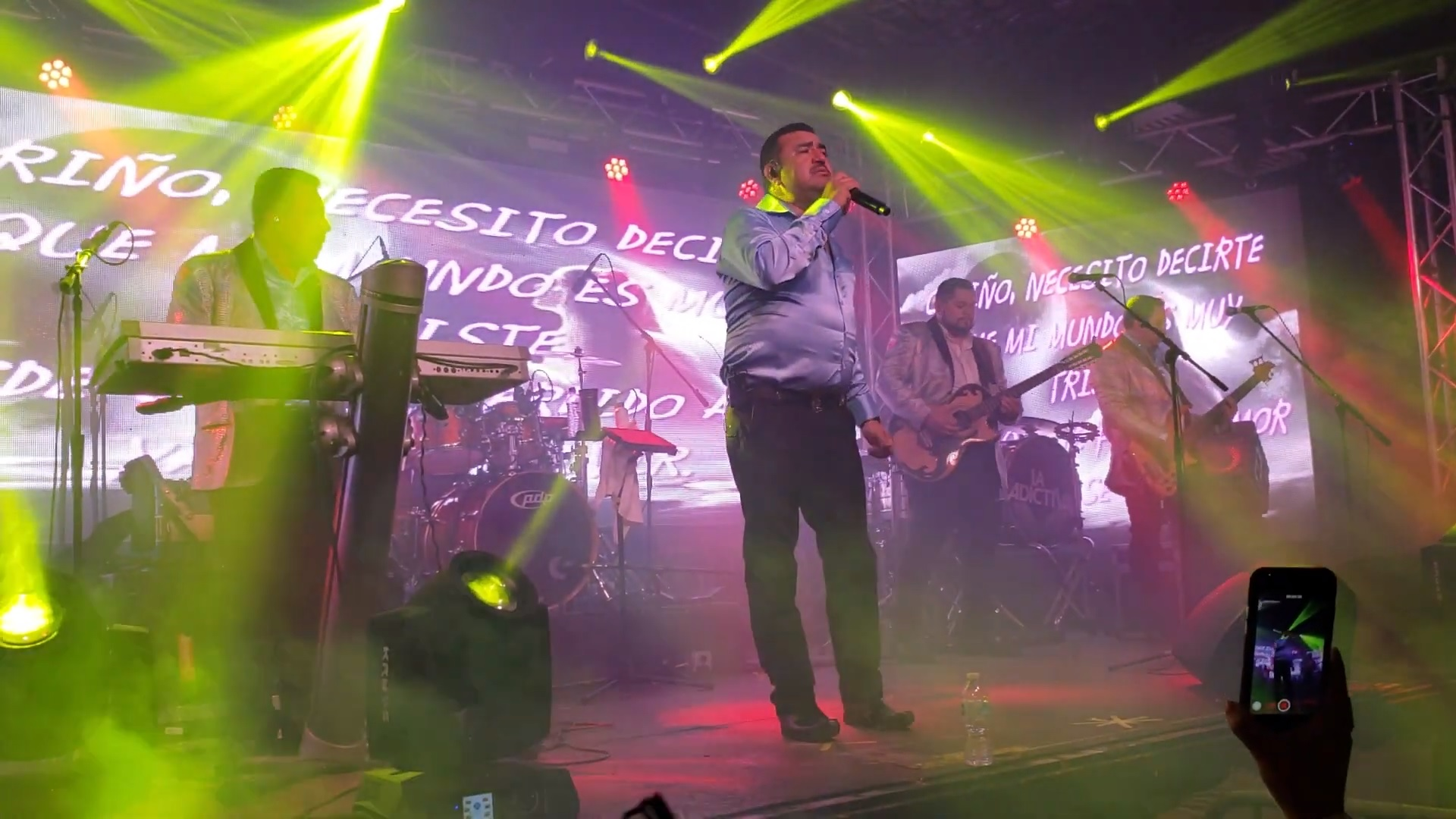
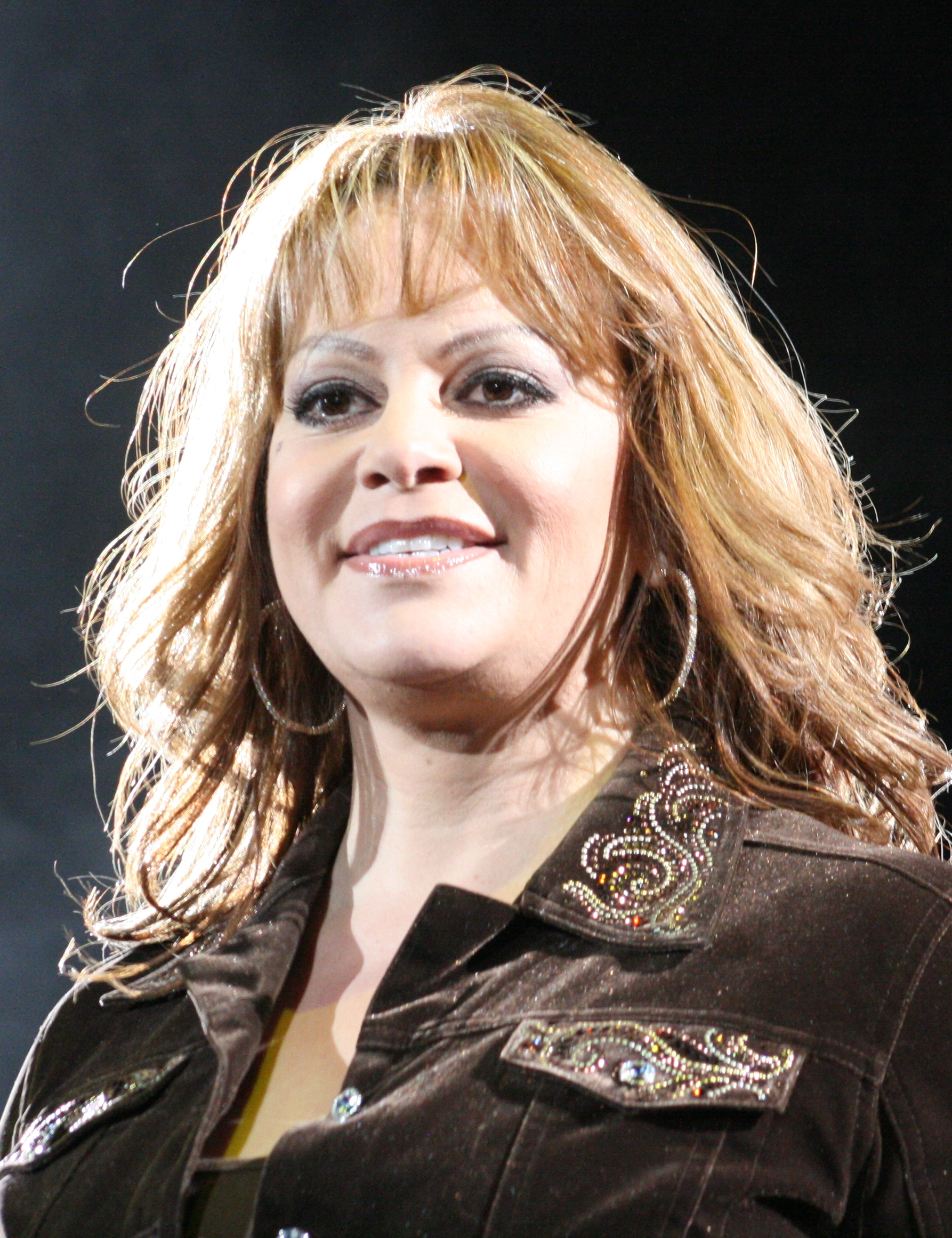
"¡Basta Ya!" was covered by Mexican musical group Conjunto Primavera (left) in 2007 and American singer Jenni Rivera (right) in 2011.

Mexican norteño-sax band Conjunto Primavera covered "¡Basta Ya!" on their studio album El Amor Que Nunca Fue (2007) as a polka ranchera song. Their version also topped the Hot Latin Songs chart as well as the Regional Mexican Airplay chart in the US. On the 2007 year-end charts, it ended as the sixth best-performing song of the year on the Hot Latin Songs chart and number seven on the Regional Mexican Airplay chart. Conjunto Primavera delivered a performance of the song during 2008 in Chihuahua, Mexico, which was later released on their live album En Vivo (2010).

Mexican-American singer Jenni Rivera's rendition of"¡Basta Ya!" was recorded for her 12th and final studio albums Joyas Prestadas: Pop and Joyas Prestadas: Banda (2011). She recorded a slow pop ballad version and slow banda ballad for each album, respectively. Solís performs as a background vocalist and is credited as a featured artist for the track. Both versions of "¡Basta Ya!" were released as the lead single from the albums on August 29, 2011.

The music video for Rivera's version was directed by Ricardo Moreno and filmed in Los Angeles, California. A live version of the song was recorded at the Teatro de la Ciudad in Mexico City for the deluxe edition of Joyas Prestadas, which was released on August 28, 2012. On December 8, 2012, Rivera performed the song during her final concert in Monterrey, Mexico, hours before her death. The show was later released as her album 1969 – Siempre, En Vivo Desde Monterrey, Parte 2 (2014). In Mexico, the song topped the Monitor Latino chart and reached number three on the Billboard Mexican Airplay chart. In the US, the song peaked at number 14 on the Hot Latin Songs chart and number six on the Regional Mexican Airplay chart. Solís was awarded in 2008 and 2012 in the Regional Mexican field at the ASCAP Latin Awards for the respective cover versions.

== Charts ==
=== Weekly charts ===
Chart performance for "¡Basta Ya!"
Chart (1996)	Peak position
US Hot Latin Songs (Billboard)	1
US Latin Pop Airplay (Billboard)	1

Chart performance for Conjunto Primavera's version
Chart (2007)	Peak position
US Hot Latin Songs (Billboard)	1
US Regional Mexican Airplay (Billboard)	1

Chart performance for Jenni Rivera's version
Chart (2011)	Peak position
Mexico Airplay (Billboard)	3
Mexico (Monitor Latino)	1
US Hot Latin Songs (Billboard)	14
US Regional Mexican Airplay (Billboard)	6

=== Year-end charts ===
1996 year-end chart performance for "¡Basta Ya!"
Chart (1996)	Position
US Hot Latin Songs (Billboard)	15
US Latin Pop Airplay (Billboard)	11

2007 year-end chart performance for Conjunto Primavera's version
Chart (2007)	Position
US Hot Latin Songs (Billboard)	6
US Regional Mexican Airplay (Billboard)	7

2012 year-end chart performance for Jenni Rivera's version
Chart (2012)	Position
US Regional Mexican Airplay (Billboard)	27

== See also ==
- Billboard Hot Latin Songs Year-End Chart
- List of number-one Billboard Hot Latin Tracks of 1996
- List of Billboard Latin Pop Airplay number ones of 1996
- List of number-one Billboard Hot Latin Songs of 2007
- List of number-one songs of 2011 (Mexico)
