= Széll Kálmán tér metro station =

Budapest metro station

Széll Kálmán tér
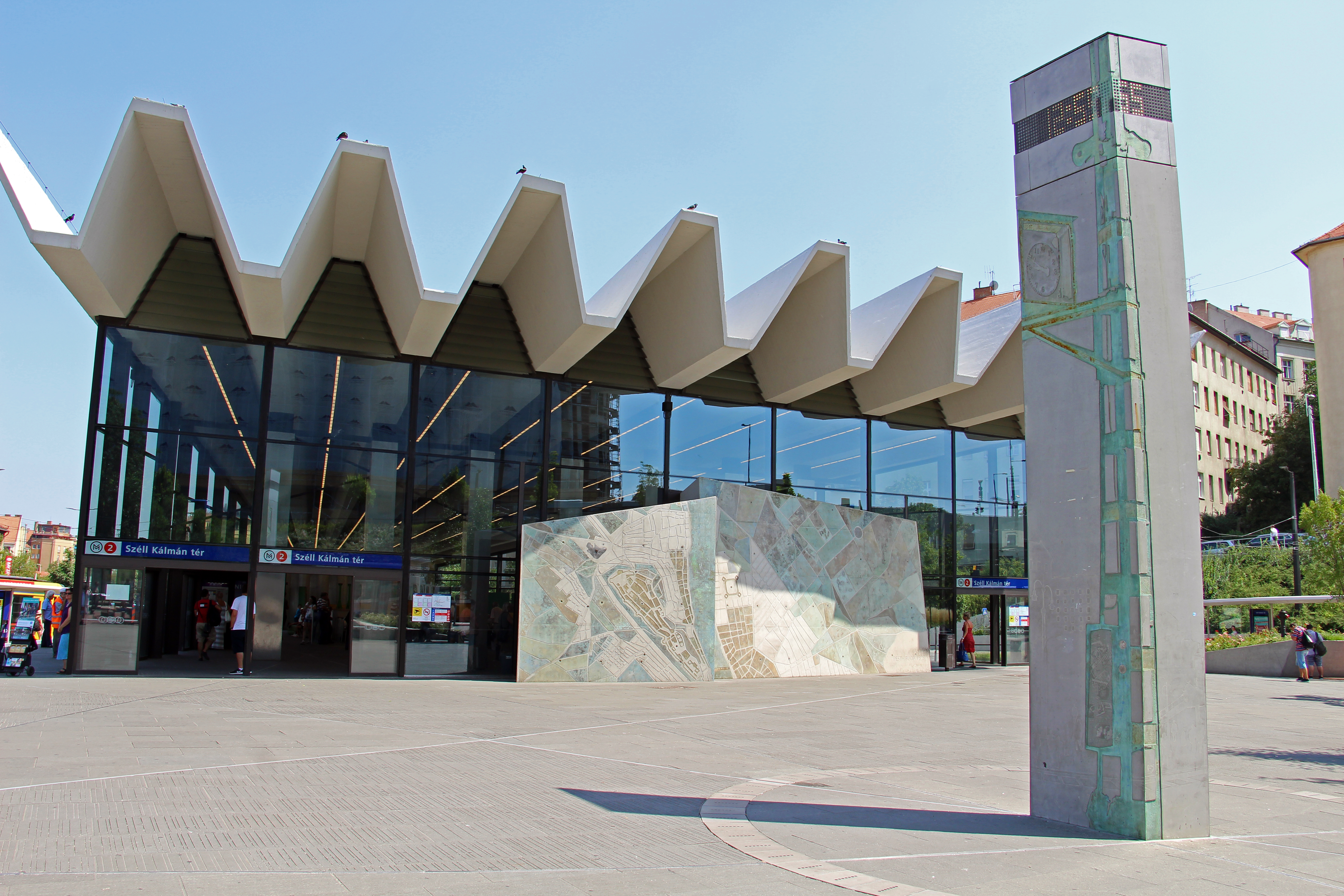
- Entrance to metro in centre of square

General information
- Coordinates: 47°30′25″N 19°01′29″E
- System: Budapest Metro station
- Platforms: 1 island platform

Construction
- Structure type: bored underground
- Depth: 38.4 meters (126 ft)

History
- Opened: 22 December 1972
- Rebuilt: 2006
- Former names: Moszkva tér (until 2011)

Services
Preceding station	Budapest Metro	Following station
Déli pályaudvar Terminus	Line 2	Batthyány tér towards Örs vezér tere
Location

Széll Kálmán tér (Széll Kálmán Square) is a station on the M2 (East-West) line of the Budapest Metro. It is located under Széll Kálmán Square in Buda. From its opening in 1972 until 2011, the station (and square) was known as Moszkva tér.

The station was opened on 22 December 1972 as part of the extension of the line from Deák Ferenc tér station to Déli pályaudvar station. At 38.4 metres (126 ft) below ground level, it is the deepest station of the Budapest Metro. Near the station, numerous bus and tram routes pass or converge, making it one of the city's major transport interchanges.

The station is accessed by a building in the centre of the square, the exterior of which is strikingly similar to that of Saint Petersburg's Pionerskaya Station. Within this building, escalators descend directly from street level to platform level. At the foot of the escalators is a concourse, which gives access to platform faces on either side, forming a single island platform.

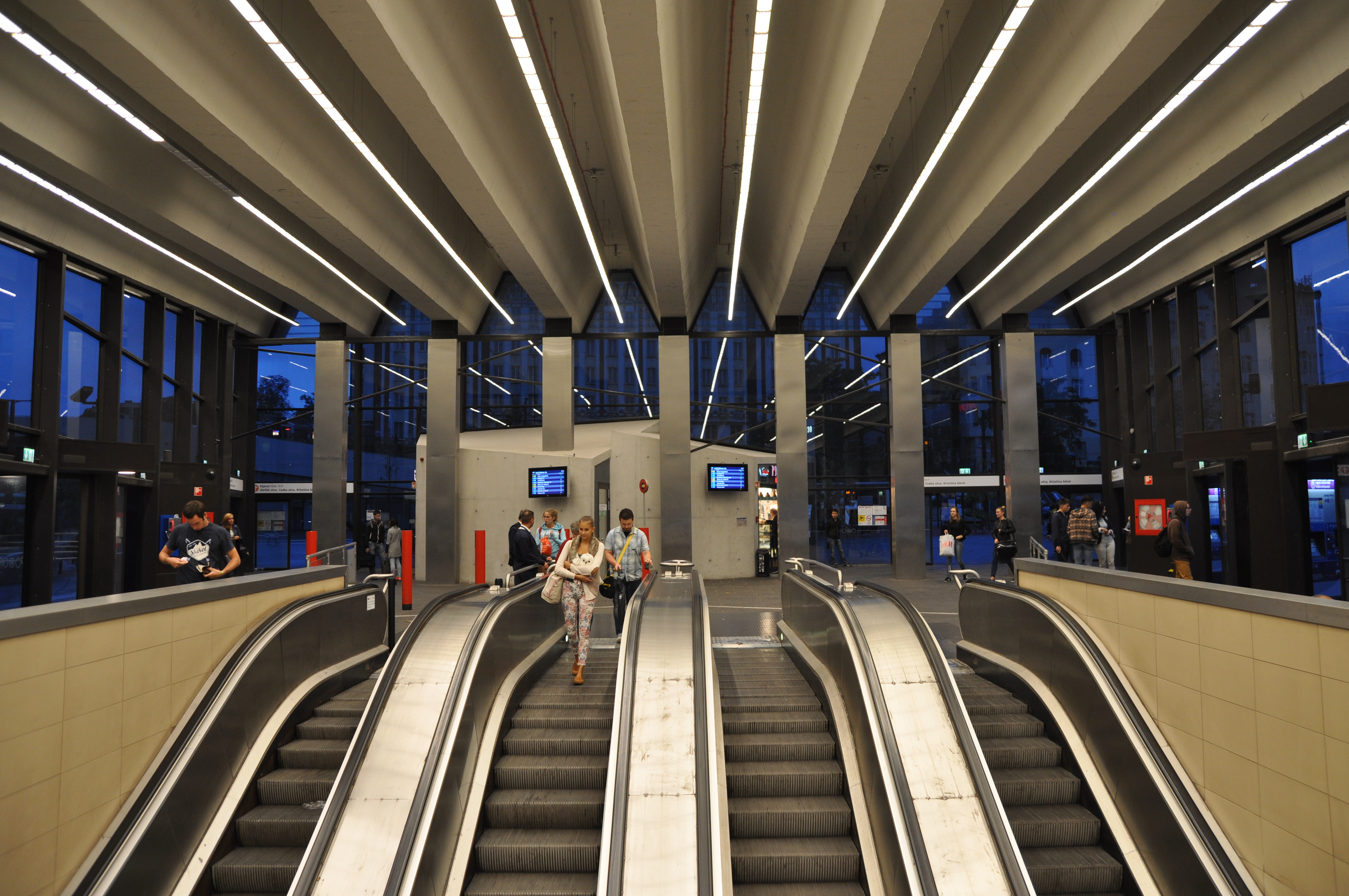
Escalators in entrance building

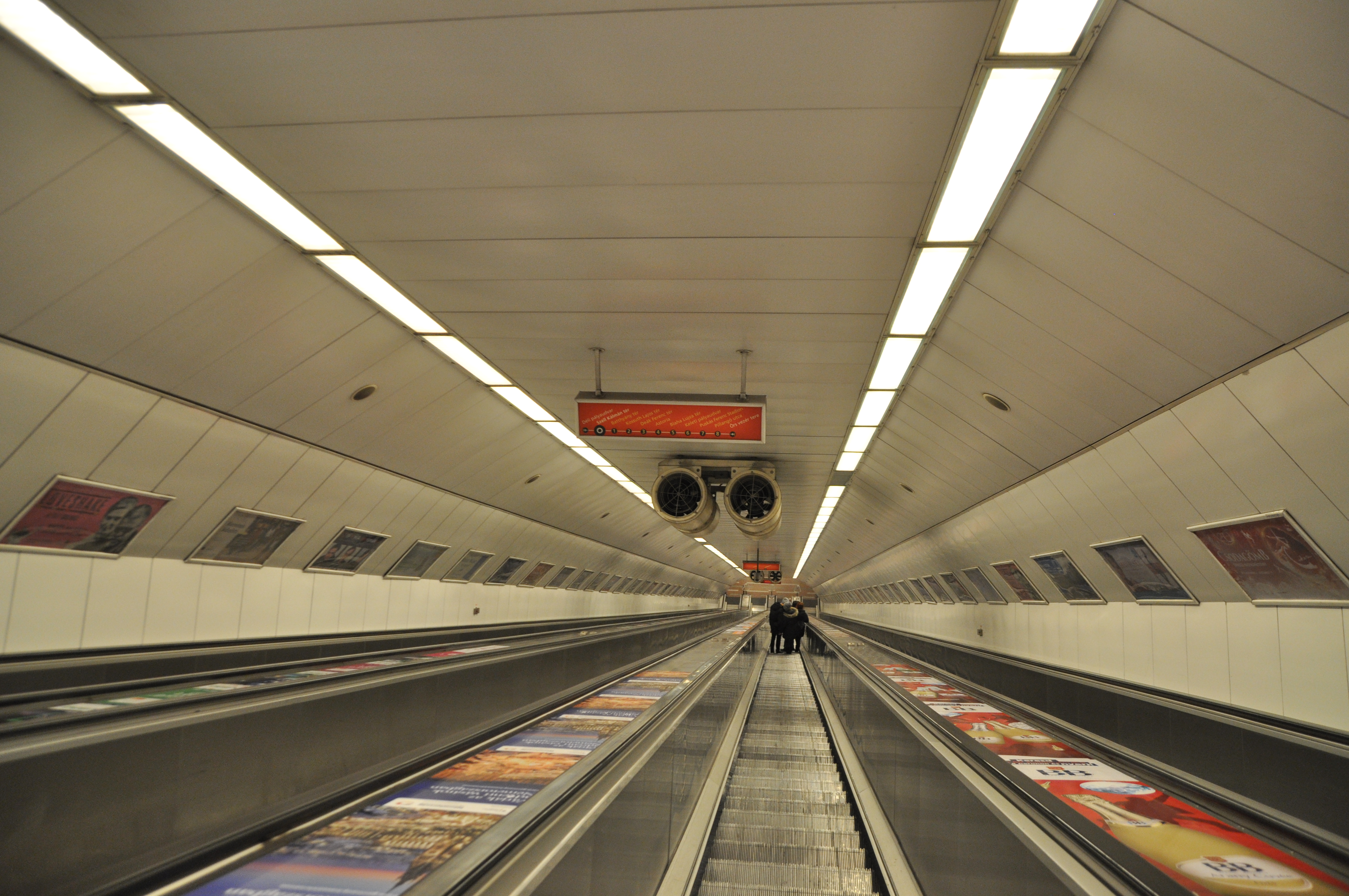
Escalators looking down

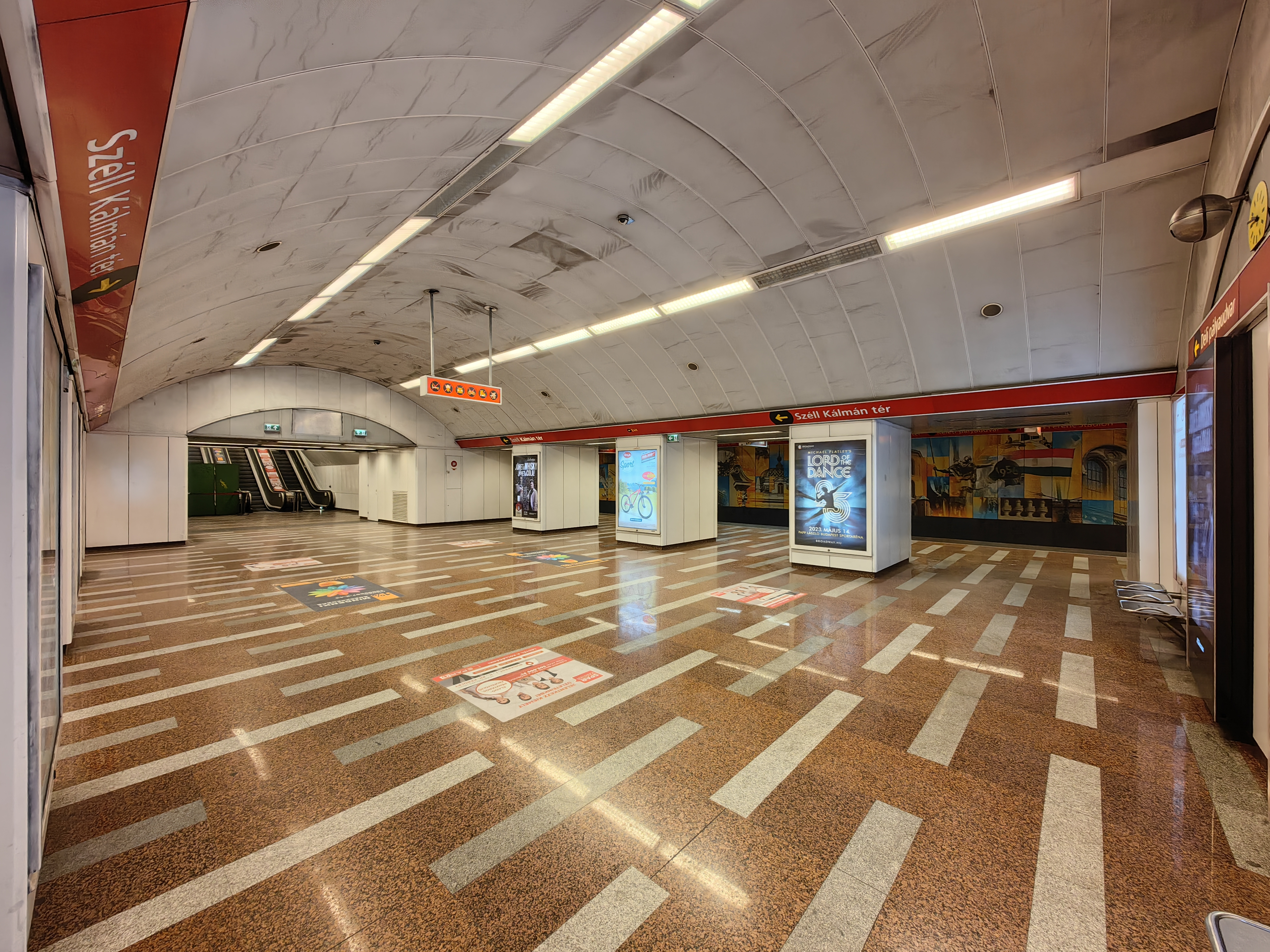
Concourse between platforms

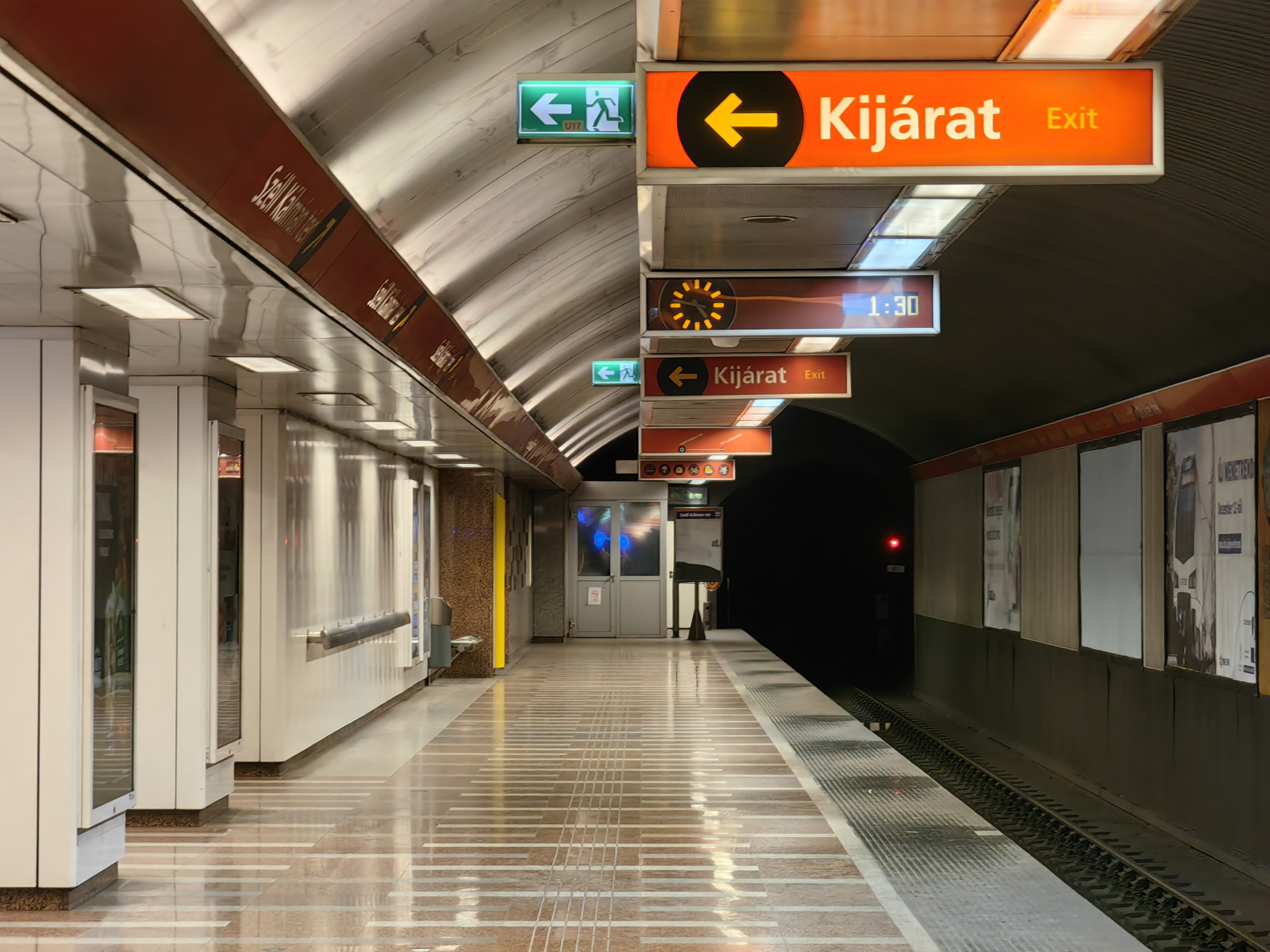
Platform

== Connections ==
- Tram
  - 4 Széll Kálmán tér – Újbuda-központ
  - 6 Széll Kálmán tér – Móricz Zsigmond körtér
  - 17 Bécsi út / Vörösvári út – Savoya Park
  - 56 Hűvösvölgy – Városház tér
  - 56A Hűvösvölgy – Móricz Zsigmond körtér
  - 59 Szent János Kórház – Márton Áron tér
  - 59A Széll Kálmán tér – Márton Áron tér
  - 59B Hűvösvölgy – Márton Áron tér
  - 61 Hűvösvölgy – Móricz Zsigmond körtér
- Bus: 5, 16, 16A, 21, 21A, 22, 22A, 39, 91, 102, 116, 128, 129, 139, 140, 140A, 149, 155, 156, 221, 222
- : 781, 782, 783, 784, 785, 786, 787, 789, 791, 793, 794, 795
