= Sobrevivir =

Studio album by Olga Tañón
- Released: 19 November 2002
- Genre: Latin pop
- Length: 68:04
- Label: Warner Music Latina

Olga Tañón chronology
Yo Por Ti (2001)	Sobrevivir (2002)	Una Nueva Mujer (2005)

Sobrevivir (Survive) is the eighth studio album by Puerto Rican recording artist Olga Tañón, released on 19 November 2002 by Warner Music Latina. The album was produced by Humberto Gatica, Kike Santander, and Manuel Tejada. Sobrevivir includes a collection of songs from different genres such as pop music, merengue, ballads, flamenco and tango. The album lead single, "Asi es La Vida", became Tañón's third number-one single in the Billboard Top Latin Songs and the seventh best-performing Latin single of the year in the United States.

Sobrevivir won a Latin Grammy Award for Best Female Pop Vocal Album. The LP was also certified Platinum (Latin) in the US by the RIAA.

== Background and release ==
Olga Tañón, the first female Hispanic performer to receive two consecutive Grammy Awards, for the albums Olga Viva, Viva Olga and Yo Por Ti, recorded Sobrevivir under the guidance of Humberto Gatica, Kike Santander, and Manuel Tejada. About the album, Tañón said: "I loved doing this album, I loved working with people who I worked. Every album I record is more mature, musically speaking." Sobrevivir continued with the crossover from tropical music to pop music that began with Nuevos Senderos, Te Acordarás de Mí and Yo Por Tí, being her first full length pop music album.

== Music and lyrics ==
Sobrevivir includes several ballads, which reminds Tañón's previous work on the album Nuevos Senderos produced by Marco Antonio Solís. "Mentiras", a ballad, tells the story of a woman who finishes a tormentous relationship. "A Partir de Hoy" is described as an "ode to positivism," while "Angel de Mi Corazon" is a tribute to Tañón's daughter. The track "Quien Diria" features co-lead vocals by fellow Puerto-Rican American singer Luis Fonsi. The album also features "Beso a Beso", a modern tango mixed with R&B, giving it a sound similar to some of Marc Anthony’s work. The singer declared about the musical content of Sobrevivir: "The album is balanced, have sentimental ballads, the kind you hear as a masochist when you finish a relationship with your boyfriend, and on the other hand, the happiness and cheerful feeling of people who are in love."

== Singles ==
The album lead single "Asi es La Vida" was released in early November, 2002, and debuted at number 43 in the Billboard Top Latin Songs chart in the week of December 2, 2002. The song peaked at number-one in the chart eight weeks later. "Asi es La Vida" also reached number two in the Latin Pop Songs chart and ended 2003 as the seventh best performing Latin single of the year in the United States. A merengue version was released in the radio station and reached number-two on the Tropical Songs chart.

"No Podrás", written and produced by Kike Santander, was released as the second and last single from the album. It peaked at number ten in the Top Latin Songs and at 16 in the Latin Pop Songs chart. Santander received a nomination for a Billboard Award for Producer of the Year for his work on the track.

== Critical reception ==
Professional ratings
Review scores
Source	Rating
AllMusic	3/5 stars
Billboard	(mixed)

The critical reception for the album has been mixed. Jason Birchmeier of AllMusic declared that Tañón "missed her mark" angering her longtime fans, who wanted more merengue, not more pop. Nevertheless, Birchmeier also named Sobrevivir "a fine album," and "about as good as any adult-leaning Latin pop release of its time." He also praised the tracks "Caramelo", "Así es La Vida", "Mentiras", "No Podrás", and especially "Quien Diria," a duet with Luis Fonsi. Leila Cobo of Billboard magazine in a mixed review of Sobrevivir, named the album "well executed", but "fails to fully define its singer: Is she a pop balladeer? A dance queen?", concluding that Tañón "sounds as if she's still searching for something else." The album was awarded the Latin Grammy Award for Best Female Pop Vocal Album. After receiving the award, Tañón said: "I swear I was surprised. Anything could have happened. The competition was very strong but I always had faith. I'm super happy."

== Track listing ==
No.	Title	Writer(s)	Length
1.	"Por Tú Amor"	José Luis Arroyave; Eduardo Ochoa; Luis Varona	03:39
2.	"Mentiras"	Roberto Dorcal; Elizabeth "Mimi" Ibarra; José Luis Morin	04:02
3.	"Caramelo"	Claudia Brant; Daniel Freiberg	03:59
4.	"A Partir De Hoy"	Guadalupe García; Manuel López	04:23
5.	"Así Es La Vida"	Manny Benito; Alejandro Campos; Juan David	03:46
6.	"No Podrás"	Kike Santander	04:31
7.	"Beso A Beso"	Rodney Alejandro; Brant; Nir Seroussi	03:51
8.	"Quién Diría" (Duet With Luis Fonsi)	Alfredo Matheus	04:14
9.	"Ojos Negros"	Virginia Faiad; Freiberg; Luis Sarmiento	04:15
10.	"Sobrevivir"	Brant; Mark Portmann	03:56
11.	"Ángel De Mi Corazón"	Brant; Fonsi	05:18
12.	"No Podrás (Ranchera)"	Santander	04:35
13.	"Caramelo (Sugar's Dance Remix)"	Brant; Freiberg	04:19

== Charts ==
Year	Chart	Peak position
2002	US Billboard Top Latin Albums	11
2002	US Billboard Latin Pop Albums	10

== Sales and certifications ==
Region	Certification	Certified units/sales
United States (RIAA)	Platinum (Latin)	64,000
