= Llévame Contigo (album) =

Studio album by Olga Tañón
- Released: May 5, 1997
- Recorded: 1996–1997
- Genre: Pop Latino, salsa, merengue
- Length: 59:55
- Label: WEA Latina

Olga Tañón chronology
| Nuevos Senderos (1996) | Llévame Contigo (1997) | Te Acordarás de Mí (1998) |

Professional ratings
Review scores
| Source | Rating |
|---|---|
| Allmusic | 4/5 stars |

Llévame Contigo ("Take Me with You") is a studio album released by singer Olga Tañón on May 5, 1997. This album became her first number-one set on the Billboard Top Latin Albums chart and received a nomination for a Grammy Award for Best Traditional Tropical Latin Album and a Lo Nuestro Award for Tropical Salsa Album of the Year.

== Track listing ==
The information from Billboard.

| No. | Title | Writer(s) | Length |
|---|---|---|---|
| 1. | "Despierta Corazón" | Raldy Vázquez | 04:04 |
| 2. | "Llegó El Amor" | Alex Enamorado | 03:50 |
| 3. | "El Frío De Tú Adiós" | Yaidelice Monrrozeau | 04:12 |
| 4. | "Porque No Te Encontré" | Gustavo Márquez | 04:40 |
| 5. | "Así Es El Amor" | Monrrozeau | 04:36 |
| 6. | "Llévame Contigo" | Enamorado | 04:34 |
| 7. | "Qué Grande Es Este Amor" | Vázquez | 03:48 |
| 8. | "Serpiente Mala" | Rodolfo Barreras | 03:41 |
| 9. | "Cuando No Puedo Verlo" | Miguel Rey | 04:09 |
| 10. | "Por Amor Al Arte" | Manny Benito | 04:17 |
| 11. | "Qué Bailen Los Niños" | Barreras | 04:41 |
| 12. | "Choque De Planetas" | Poggui Almendros | 04:47 |
| 13. | "Lo Qué Son Las Apariencias" | Enrique Feliz | 04:35 |
| 14. | "Siempre En Mí Corazón" | Pete Astudillo, Abraham Quintanilla III | 04:20 |

== Chart performance ==
=== Weekly charts ===
| Chart (1996) | Peak position |
|---|---|
| US Billboard Top Latin Albums | 1 |
| US Billboard Tropical/Salsa | 1 |
| US Billboard 200 | 175 |

=== Year-end charts ===
| Chart (1997) | Position |
|---|---|
| US Latin Albums (Billboard) | 21 |
| US Tropical Albums (Billboard) | 2 |

| Chart (1998) | Position |
|---|---|
| US Latin Albums (Billboard) | 50 |

== See also ==
- List of number-one Billboard Top Latin Albums from the 1990s
- List of number-one Billboard Tropical Albums from the 1990s
- Olga Tañón discography
