= 1945 (2017 film) =

2017 film

- Film poster
- Directed by: Ferenc Török
- Written by: Gábor T. Szántó; Ferenc Török
- Produced by: Iván Angelusz; Péter Reich; Ferenc Török
- Starring: Péter Rudolf; Tamás Szabó Kimmel; Dóra Sztarenki; Bence Tasnádi
- Cinematography: Elemér Ragályi
- Edited by: Béla Barsi
- Music by: Tibor Szemző
- Production company: Katapult Film
- Distributed by: Katapult Film
- Release dates: 12 February 2017 (Berlin); 20 April 2017 (Hungary)
- Running time: 91 minutes
- Country: Hungary
- Language: Hungarian
- Box office: $1 million

1945 is a 2017 Hungarian drama film directed by Ferenc Török and co-written by Török and Gábor T. Szántó. It concerns two Jewish survivors of the Holocaust who arrive in a Hungarian village in August 1945, and the paranoid reactions of the villagers, some of whom fear that these and other Jews are coming to reclaim Jewish property.

The film was screened in the Panorama section at the 67th Berlin International Film Festival and was awarded the 3rd place prize in the Panorama Audience Award.

== Cast ==
- Péter Rudolf as Mr. István
- Bence Tasnádi as Mr. Árpád
- Tamás Szabó Kimmel as Jancsi
- Dóra Sztarenki as Kisrózsi
- Ági Szirtes as Mrs. Kustár
- József Szarvas as Kustár András
- Eszter Nagy-Kálózy as Mrs. Szentes
- Iván Angelusz as Sámuel Hermann
- Marcell Nagy as Sámuel's son
- János Derzsi as War veteran

== Reception ==
On review aggregator website Rotten Tomatoes, the film holds an approval rating of 97%, based on 67 reviews, and an average rating of 7.7/10. The website's critical consensus reads, "1945 sifts through the aftermath of the Holocaust to offer a sober, well-crafted look at a variety of weighty themes." On Metacritic, the film has a weighted average score of 73 out of 100, based on 13 critics, indicating "generally favorable reviews".
