= 4/13 =

Studio album by Olga Tañón
- Released: November 10, 2009
- Recorded: 2009
- Genre: Latin pop, salsa, merengue
- Length: 38:52
- Label: Sony Music Latino; Zamora Music Group

Olga Tañón chronology
Exitos En 2 Tiempos (2007)	4/13 (2009)

Singles from 4/13
- 1. "Pasión Morena" Released: May 29, 2009; 2. "Amor Entre Tres" Released: May 29, 2009; 3. "Navidad Boricua" Released: December 10, 2009

4/13 is the 12th studio album by the Puerto Rican singer Olga Tañón, released on November 10, 2009.

== Background ==
The album contains songs that the artist had previously released in digital format. The songs are: "Amore Entre Tres" and "Pasión Morena", which were launched simultaneously. It also contains a DVD which includes medleys of some of her classics. The album is presented under the label Zamora Music Group, although it is manufactured and distributed by Sony Music Latin. "Amore Entre Tres" came to occupy its space on several Latin music stations. "Amor Entre Tres" was also featured as the theme song for a Venezuelan telenovela called " La Vida Entera".

Meanwhile, "Pasión Morena" was chosen as the soundtrack for a drama project for TV Azteca-Mexico of the same name. "Pasión Morena", composed by Jose Luis Morin and Olga Tanon, is about making a claim to freedom of people and their struggle to live life to its fullest. The new line of clothing from the Puerto Rican singer also goes by the name "Pasion Morena". "Navidad Boricua", is another new song that is included in the album. The cut is a duet with Victoria Sanabria who serves as the exclusive artist.

== Track listing ==
Disc 1
No.	Title	Length
1.	"Amor Entre Tres (Salsa version)"	4:23
2.	"Pasión Morena (Merengue version)"	4:00
3.	"Navidad Boricua (feat. Victoria Sanabria)"	4:03
4.	"Amor Entre Tres (Ballad version)"	4:14
5.	"Pasión Morena (Pop Ballad version)"	4:07

Disc 2
No.	Title	Length
1.	"Porque No Te Encontre / Desesperadamente Tuya / Así Es El Amor"	6:49
2.	"Me Cambio Por Ella / Aún Pienso En Ti / No Te Das Cuenta"	5:57
3.	"Receta De Amor / Que Bailen Los Niños / Yo Por Tí"	5:23

== Charts ==
Chart (2009)	Peak position
US Top Latin Albums (Billboard)	20
US Tropical Albums (Billboard)	4
