= Széll Kálmán tér =

Square in Budapest, Hungary

Coordinates: 47°30′25.50″N 19°01′27.14″E

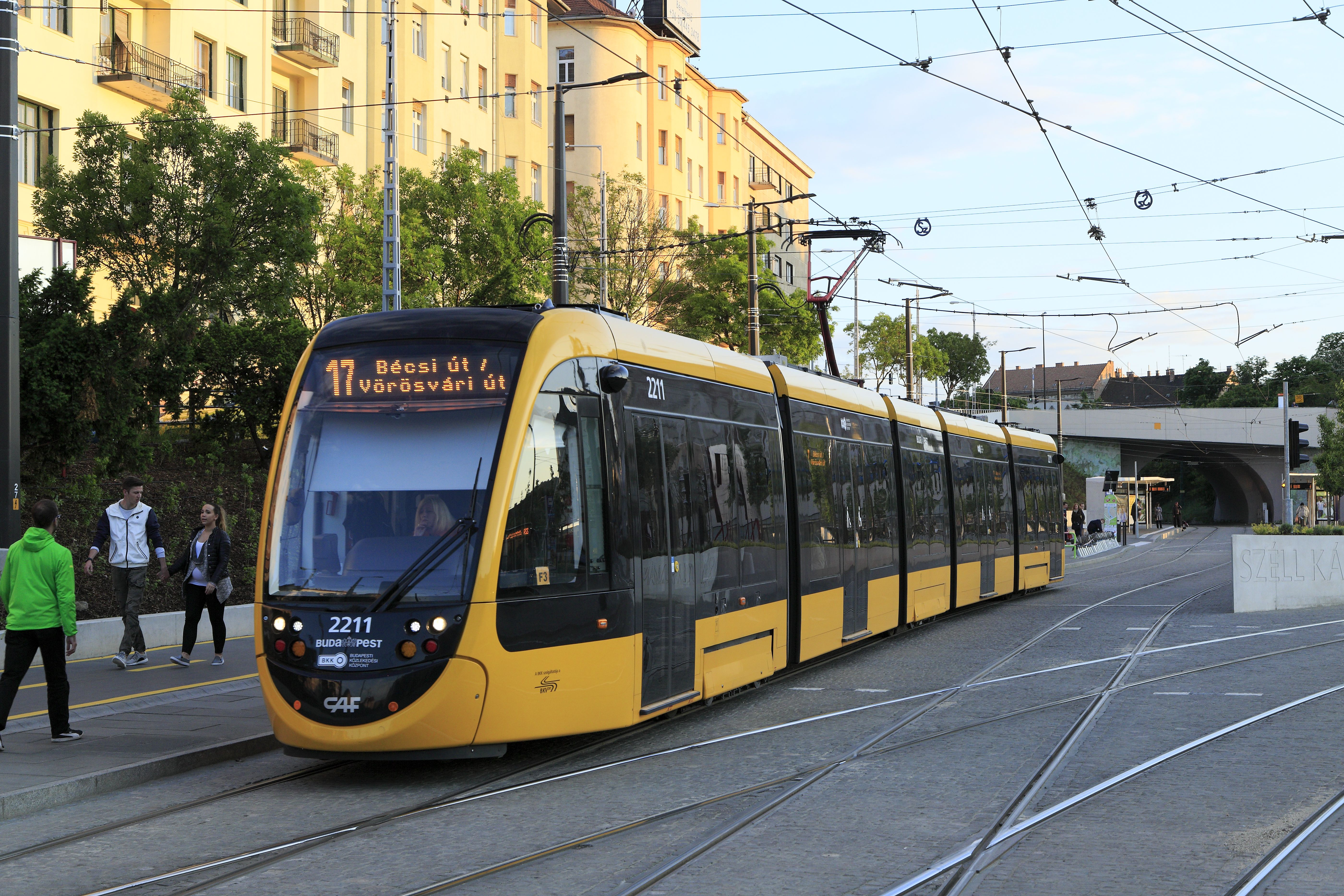
Urbos 3 Tram on the square, which is a node in Budapest tram network

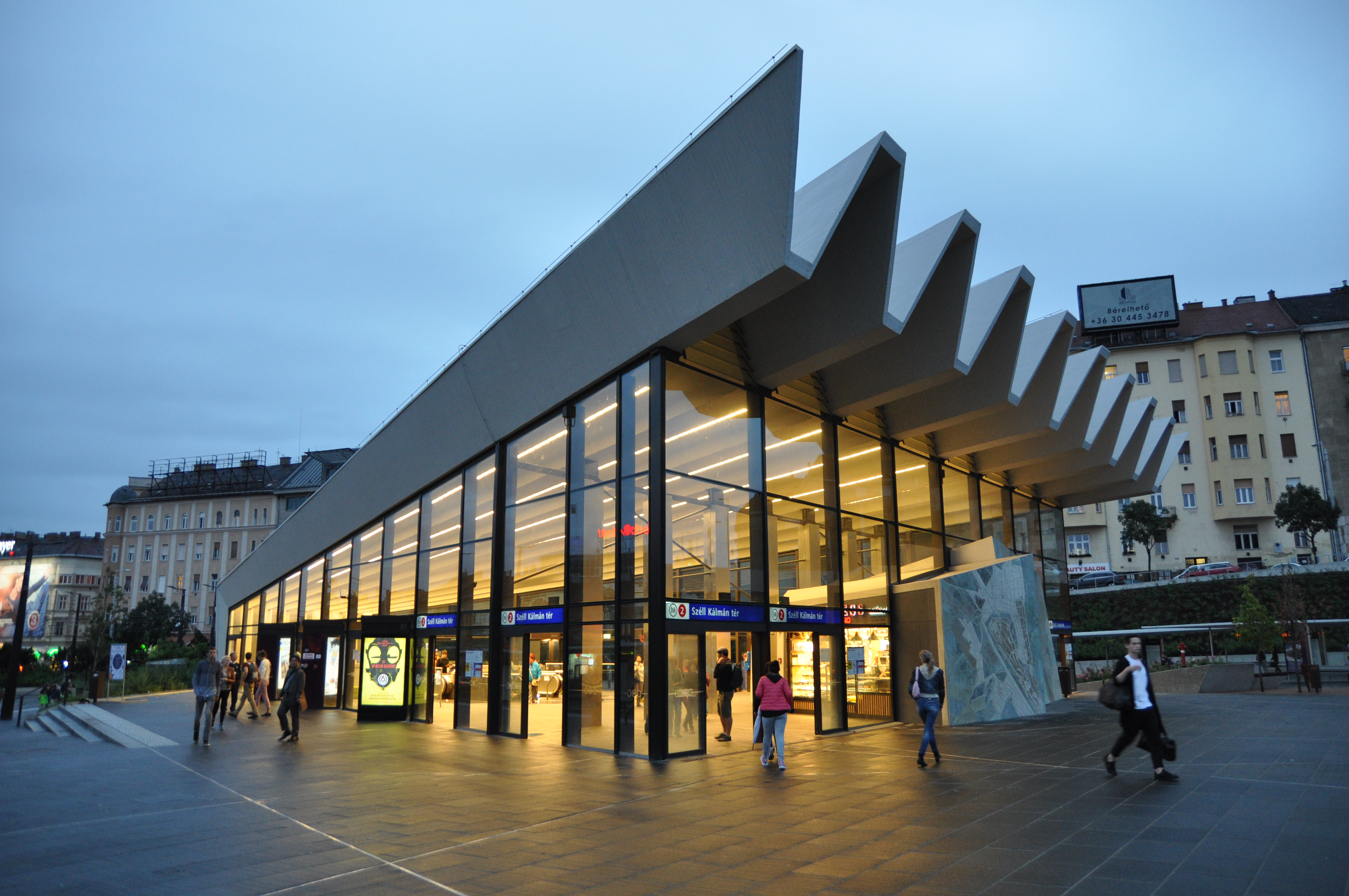
Entrance to the metro station on the square

Széll Kálmán tér (Széll Kálmán Square, formerly known as Moszkva tér or Moscow Square between 1951 and 2011) is a square in Budapest. It is one of the city's busiest transport interchanges (comparable to Móricz Zsigmond körtér farther south), which is served by a station on Metro line 2, tram lines 4, 6, 17, 56, 56A, 59, 59A, 59B, 61 and bus lines 5, 16, 16A, 21, 21A, 22, 22A, 39, 91, 102, 116, 128, 129, 139, 140, 140A, 142, 149, 155, 156, 222.

Several buses head for the popular hiking destinations of the Buda hills so this square (with the classic, old clock above it) is a common meeting place for those going on excursions. It can be considered the centre of Buda, because of its traffic and the several stores around it, including Mammut, a shopping mall. Buda Castle is easily accessible from here, either on foot or by bus lines 16, 16A or 116.

== History ==
The originally anonymous area became Széll Kálmán tér (Széll Kálmán Square) in 1929, named after the Hungarian prime minister Kálmán Széll. Following the Soviet occupation and the Communist takeover in the country, the square was renamed to Moszkva tér in 1951 under the Rákosi regime. Following the fall of communist regimes in Eastern Europe, it was debated whether it should be renamed again to the original Széll Kálmán, but initially the name remained.

During the first part of the 1956 revolution Soviet troops (who at the time were stationed in the western part of the country, near Székesfehérvár) tried to capture the city, attacking towards this square. This first attempt was unsuccessful and the country was free until the November 1956 Soviet invasion.

On March 26, 2011, the City Council of Budapest, restored the original name of the square, Széll Kálmán tér. In 2011, a renovation of the square was planned, with a budget of three billion forints.

On January 21, 2015, renovations of Széll Kálmán tér began. The reconstruction work was completed in 2016 and introduced a modern design, high quality services and a greener, more integrated public space.

An amount of HUF 5.3 billion, provided from government, EU and municipal funds, is at the disposal of the Municipality of Budapest. The reconstruction work activities lasted till the spring of 2016, taking place in several phases, in some cases causing occasional inconveniences related to traffic.

== Gallery ==
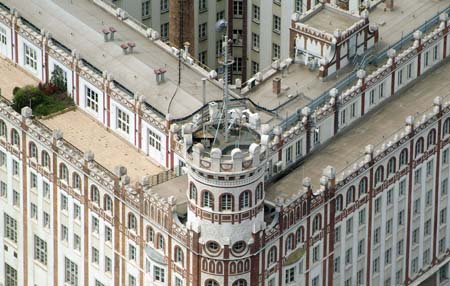

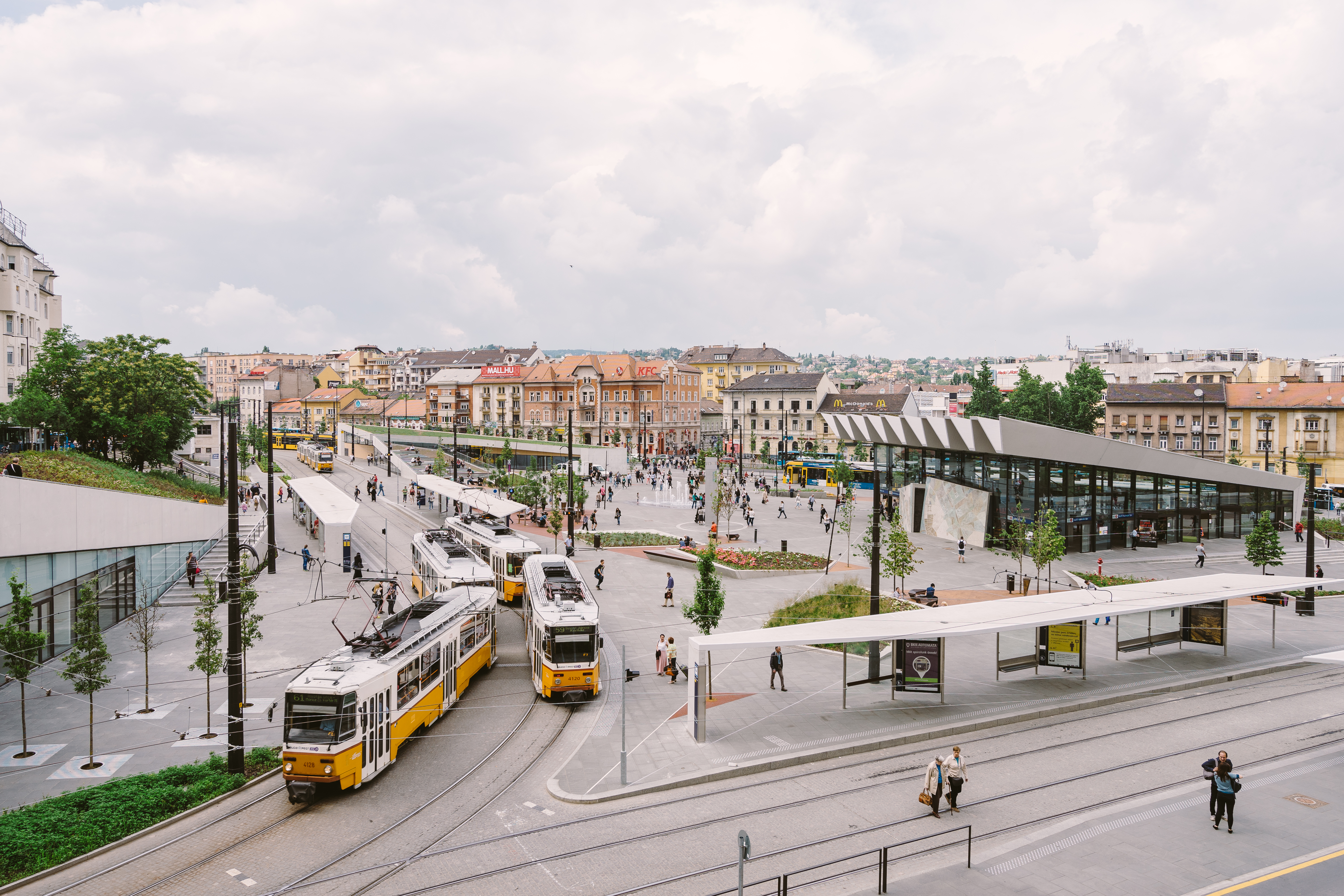

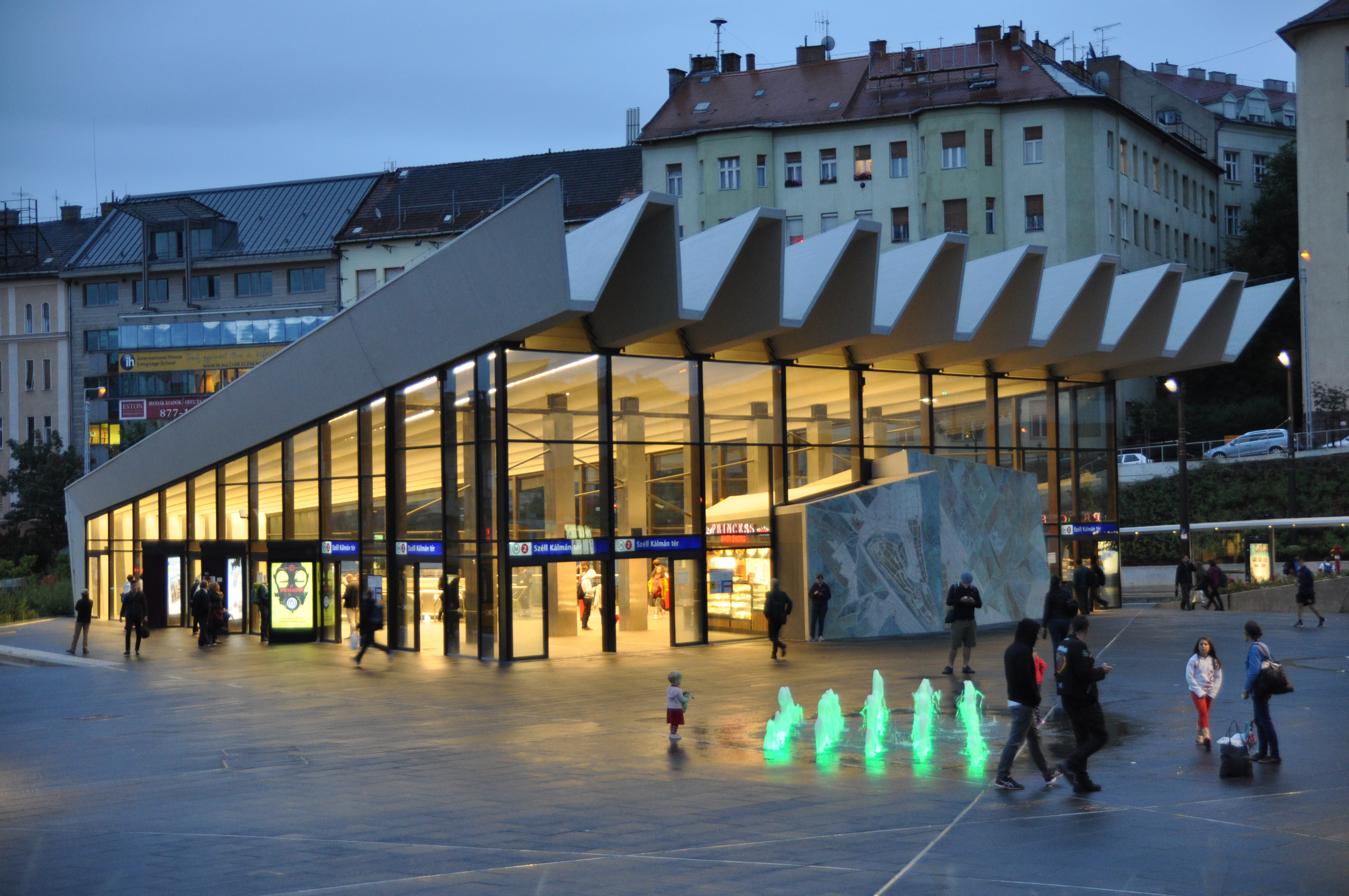

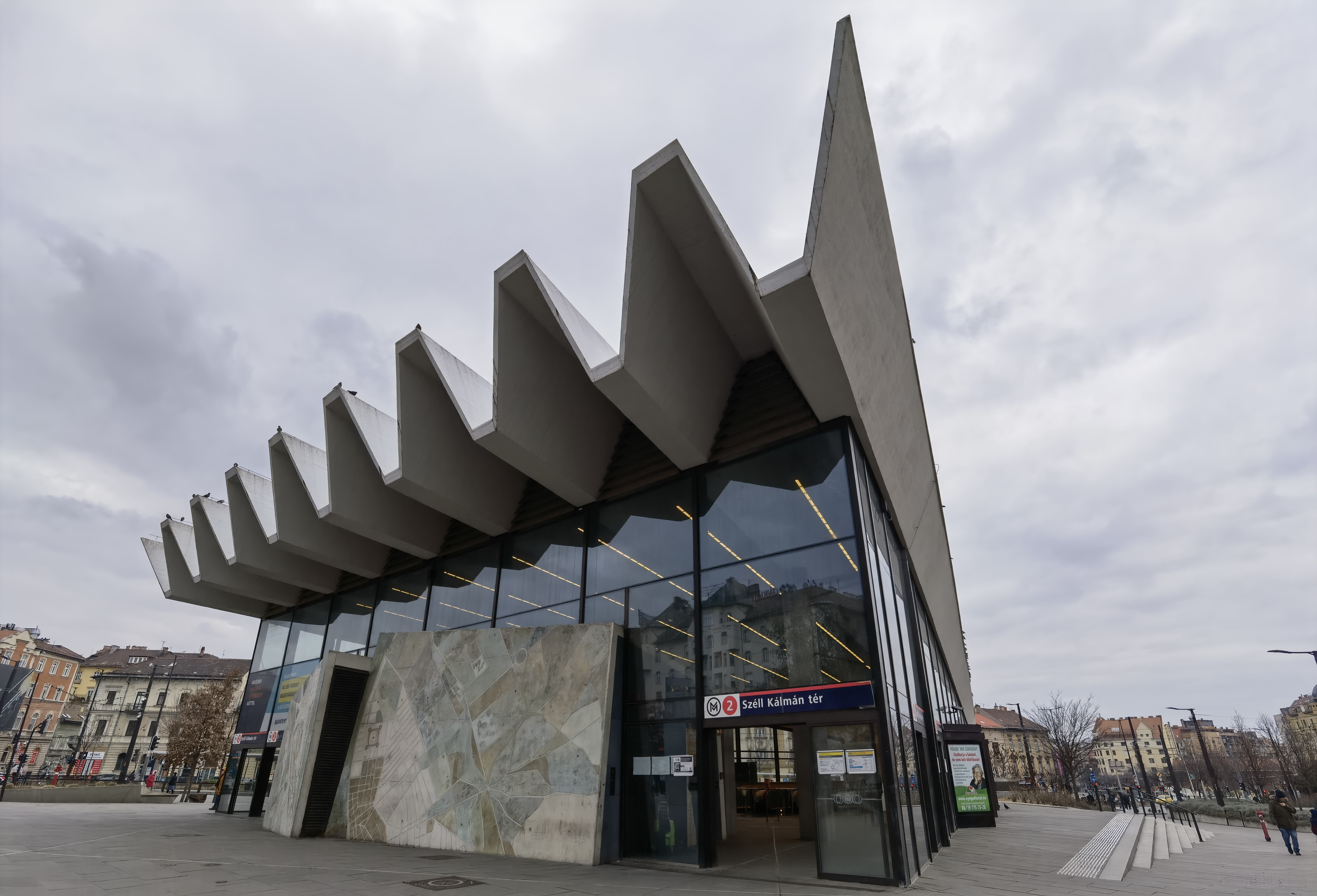

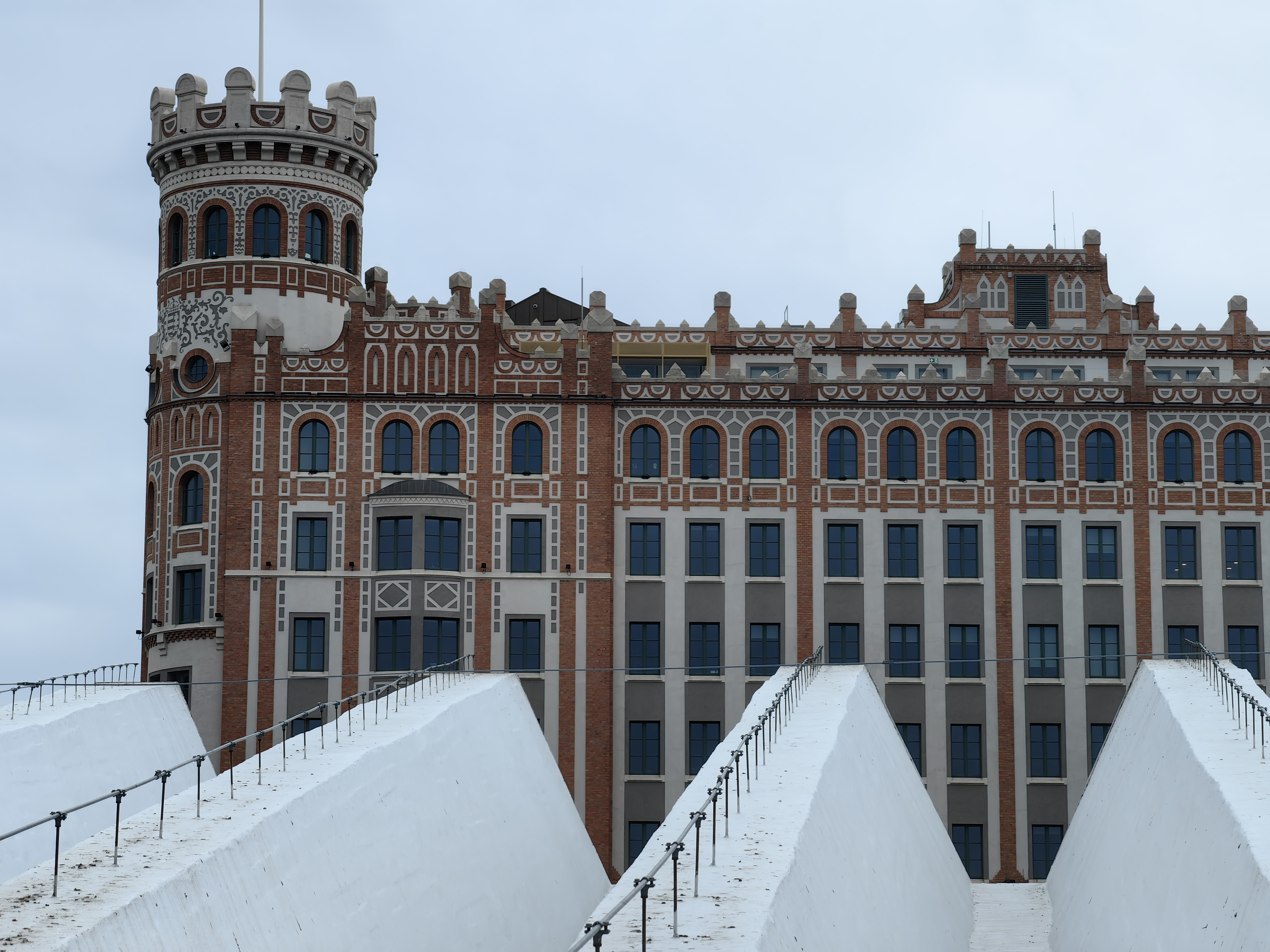

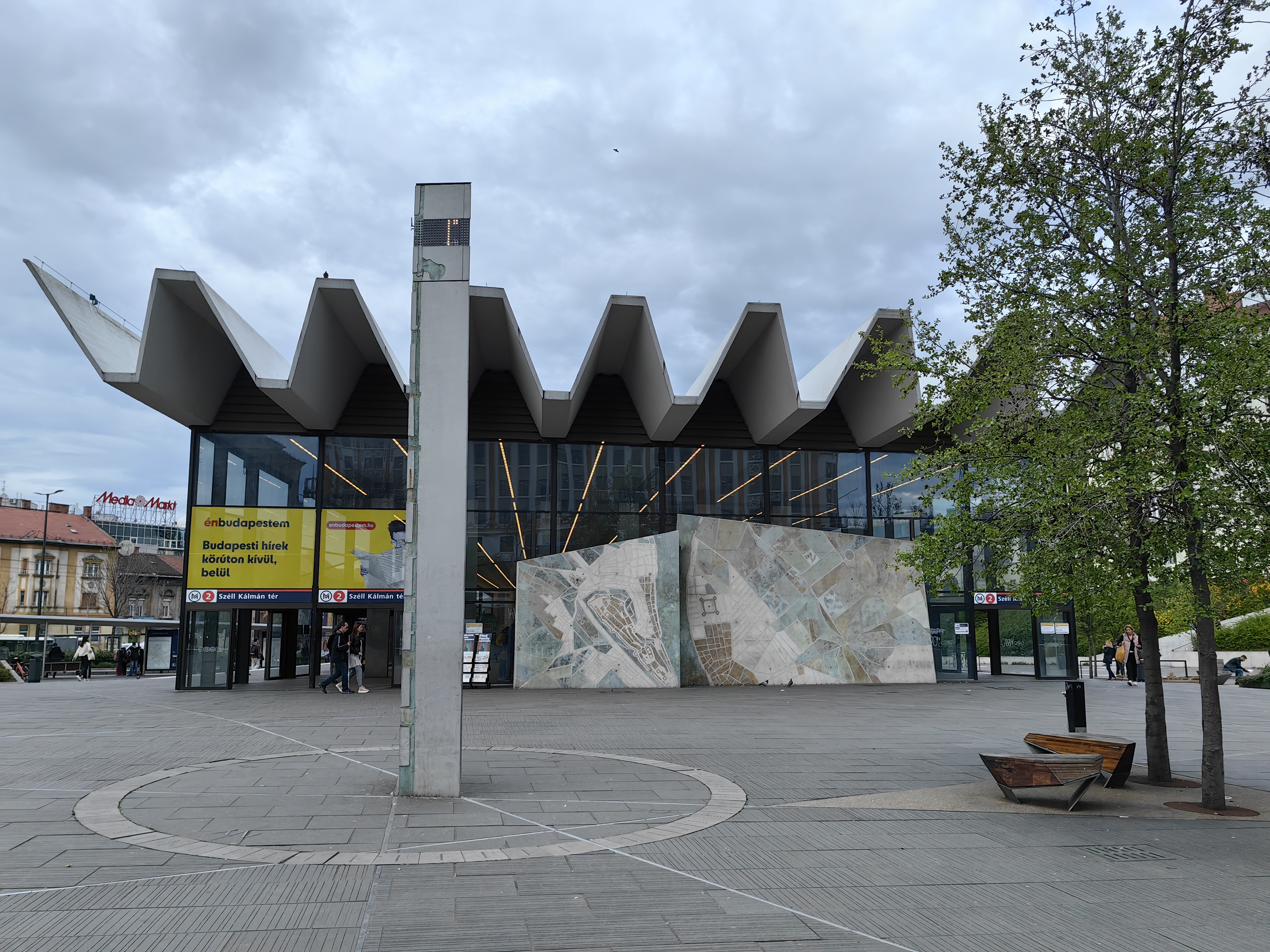

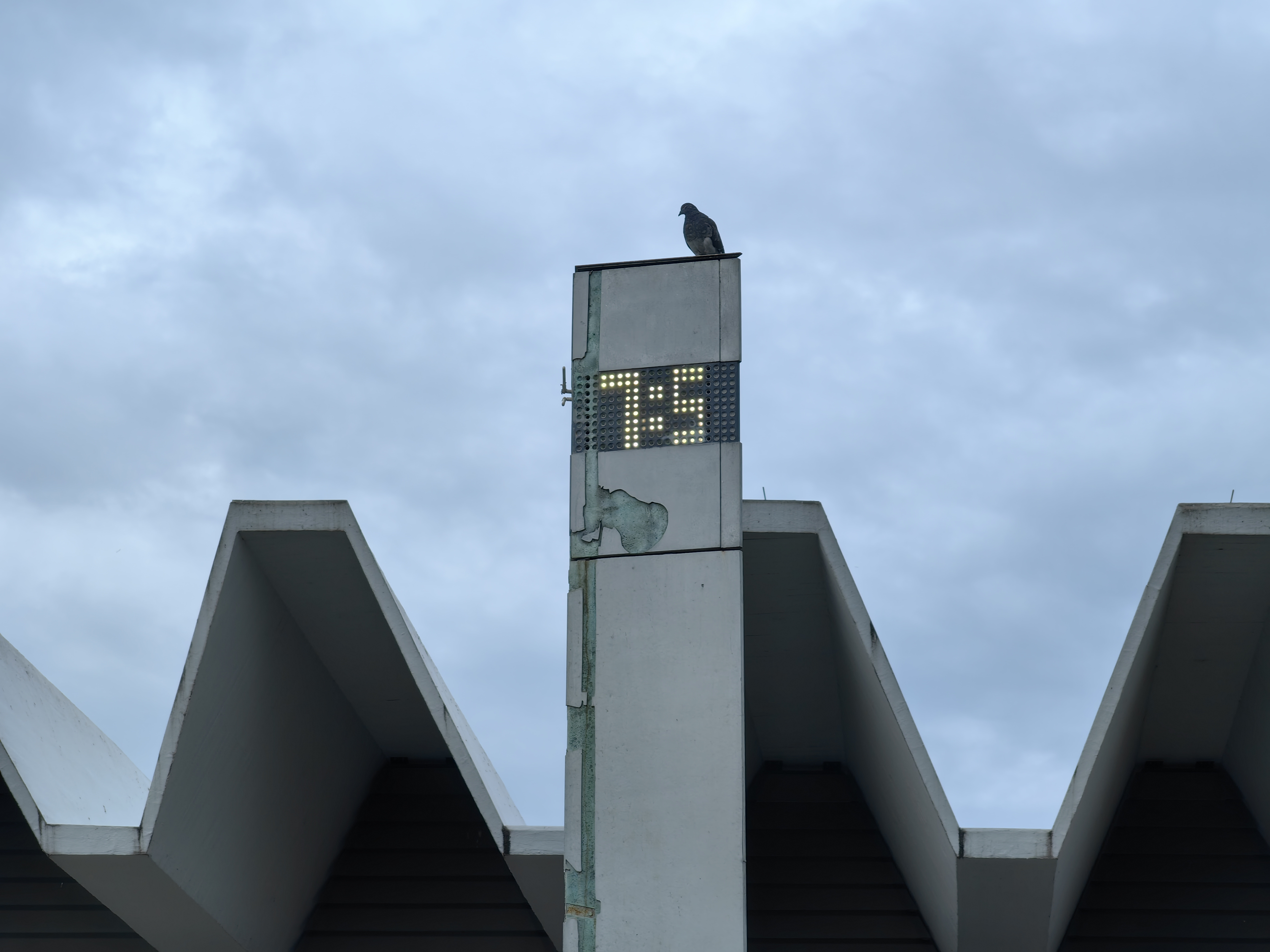

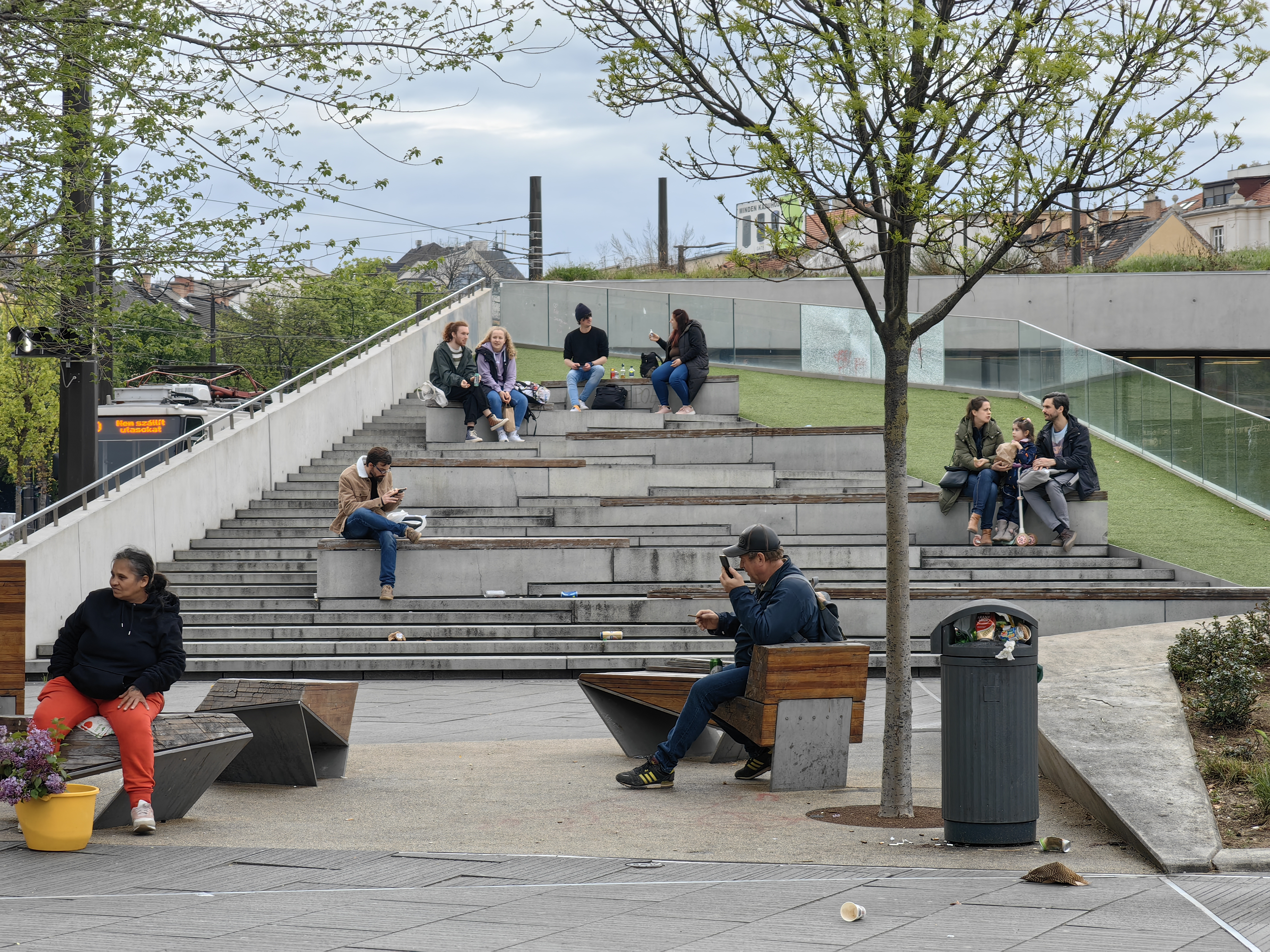

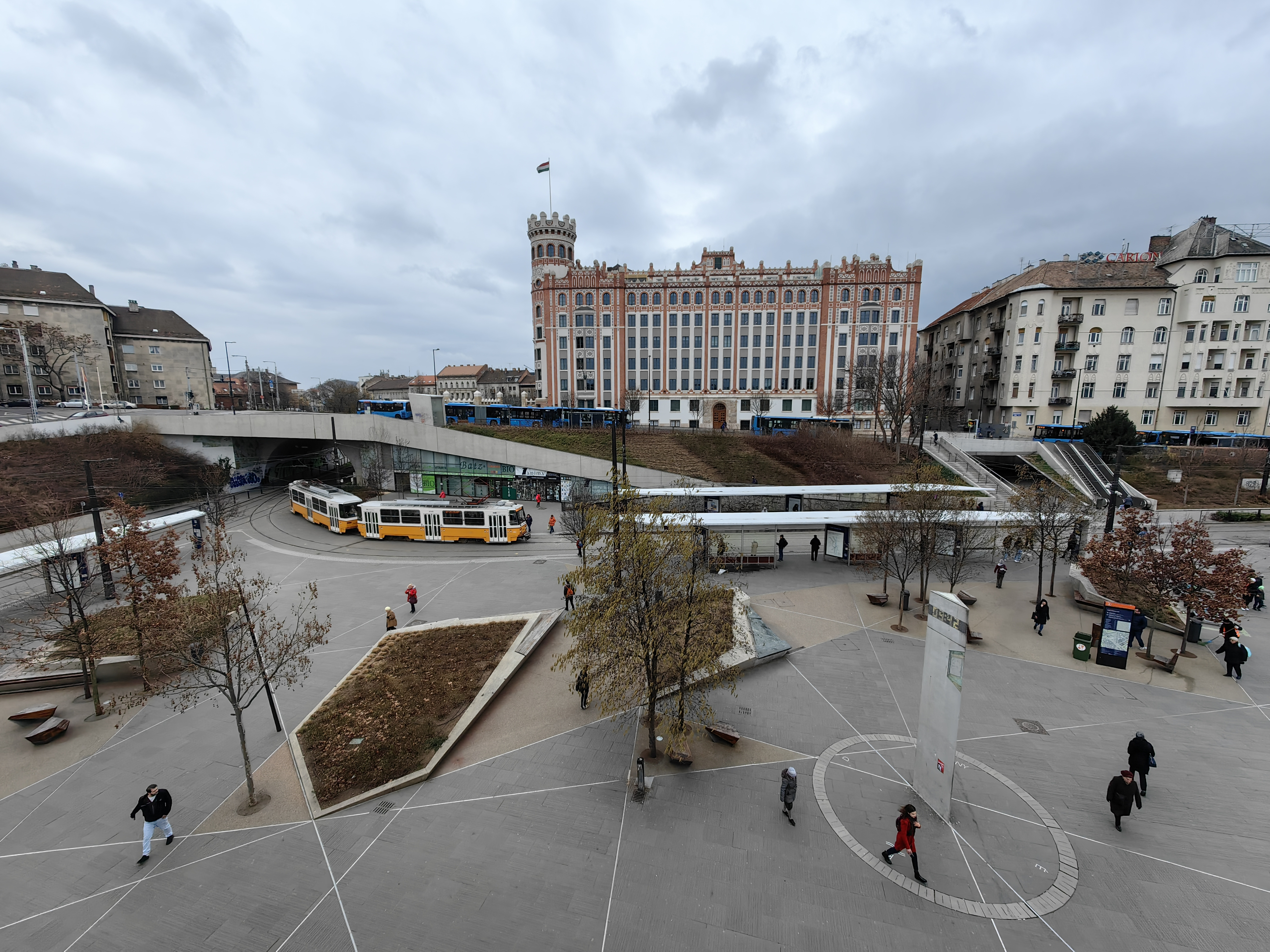

== See also ==
- Moscow Square (film) - 2001 film named for the square
