= Moscow Square (film) =

2001 Hungarian film by Ferenc Török

- Directed by: Ferenc Török
- Written by: Ferenc Török
- Cinematography: Dániel Garas
- Release date: 20 September 2001
- Running time: 88 minutes
- Country: Hungary
- Language: Hungarian

Moscow Square (Hungarian: Moszkva tér) is a Hungarian film released in 2001. It is named after Moscow Square in Budapest (now called Széll Kálmán Square) and focuses on a group of high school students who would rather party than take notice of the history taking place around them in 1989.

== Cast ==
- Gábor Karalyos – Petya
- Eszter Balla – Zsófi
- Erzsi Pápai – Boci mama
- Ilona Béres – Igazgatónő
