= Nuevos Senderos =

Studio album by Olga Tañón
- Released: April 16, 1996
- Recorded: 1995
- Genre: Latin pop
- Length: 36:38
- Label: WEA Latina
- Producer: Marco Antonio Solís

Olga Tañón chronology
Siente el Amor... (1994)	Nuevos Senderos (1996)	Llévame Contigo (1997)

Professional ratings
Review scores
Source	Rating
Allmusic	3.5/5 stars

Nuevos Senderos ("New Paths") is the fourth studio album released by Puerto Rican singer Olga Tañón on April 16, 1996. The album marks a musical departure from her merengue recordings and instead focuses on pop ballads. The songs were composed and produced by Mexican singer-songwriter Marco Antonio Solís, except for "Cuestión de Suerte", which was written by Jesus Monarrez. It was nominated at the 9th Lo Nuestro Awards in 1997 for "Pop Album of the Year".

== Track listing ==
All tracks are written by Marco Antonio Solís, except where noted

Nuevos Senderos track listing
No.	Title	Writer(s)	Length
1.	"Mi Eterno Amor Secreto"		05:10
2.	"En Ti"		03:28
3.	"Cuestión De Suerte"	Jesus Monarrez	03:22
4.	"Mi Perdón"		03:00
5.	"El Daño Que Me Haces"		03:10
6.	"Siempre Estuve Cerca"		03:15
7.	"La Última Oportunidad"		04:33
8.	"Me Subes, Me Bajas, Me Subes"		03:04
9.	"¡Basta Ya!"		04:20
10.	"No Te Vas"		03:16

== Charts ==
=== Weekly charts ===
Chart (1996)	Peak position
US Billboard 200	170
US Top Latin Albums (Billboard)	2
US Latin Pop Albums (Billboard)	2

=== Year-end charts ===
Chart (1996)	Peak position
US Top Latin Albums (Billboard)	14
US Latin Pop Albums (Billboard)	12

== Certifications ==
Region	Certification	Certified units/sales
United States (RIAA)	Gold	500,000^{^}
^{^} Shipments figures based on certification alone.

== See also ==
- Olga Tañón discography
