= Samo Zaen =

Syrian singer and actor

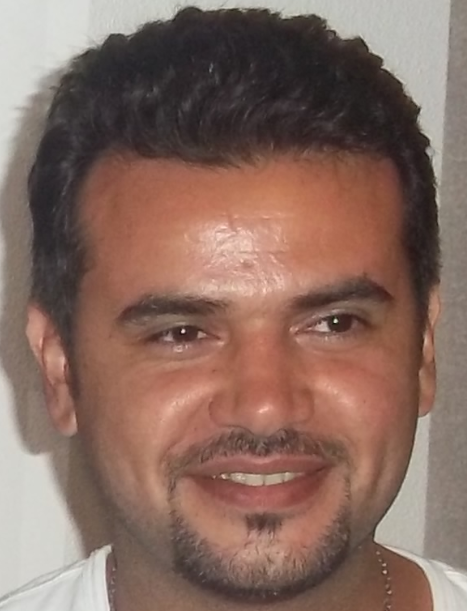
- Born: Osama Mohamed Zaen Alabras; November 10, 1979 (age 46); Kuwait
- Occupations: Singer, Actor, Producer, Audio Engineer
- Spouses: Christina (divorced) Dina Saleh (m. 2016)
- Children: 2

Samo Zaen (real name Osama Alabras - born on 10 November 1979 in Kuwait) is a Syrian singer and actor. He began his career in 1999 after releasing his first album Mili Ya Hilwa. Samo Zaen has released more than five albums under the Egyptian production company Mazzika and has also collaborated with Kelma Music on a separate album.

== Life ==
Samo Zaen was born in Kuwait to a Syrian family from Latakia, after finishing his high school he immigrated to London for studying Audio engineering. He released his first album Mili Ya Hilwa in 1999, his second album Ana leek was released in 2002.

Samo Zaen changed his name from Osama to Samo for similarity to Osama bin Laden. Samo Zaen was married to an English woman named Christina and he has one daughter with her named Nagham. He held British citizenship from his marriage, they divorced and he then married the Egyptian Radio presenter Dina Saleh in 2016. He has one son with her.

== Albums ==
- Mili Ya Hilwa in 1999
- Ana leek in 2002
- Araby leya in 2003
- Maak in 2005
- Aref eh in 2007
- Lek Lewahdak in 2008
- Dayman in 2010
- Elward elahmar in 2012
- Zay ay etnen in 2014
- El Amar in 2017
- Law Omry Yergaa in 2018

== Filmography ==
- Hamada in 2005
- 90 minutes in 2006
- Favor of life in 2017
- Badal elhatota talata in 2018
