= Te Acordarás de Mí =

Studio album by Olga Tañón
- Released: October 27, 1998
- Genre: Pop Latino, salsa, merengue
- Length: 48:39
- Label: WEA Latina
- Producer: Rudy Perez

Olga Tañón chronology
Llévame Contigo (1997)	Te Acordarás de Mí (1998)	Olga Viva, Viva Olga (1999)

Professional ratings
Review scores
Source	Rating
Allmusic	3.5/5 stars

Te Acordarás de Mí ("You Will Remember Me") is the title of a studio album released by singer Olga Tañón on October 27, 1998. This album became her second number-one album on the Billboard Top Latin Albums.

The song "Voy A Sacarte De Mi Mente" is a Spanish-language version of Go West's hit song "King of Wishful Thinking".

== Track listing ==
The information from Billboard.

No.	Title	Writer(s)	Length
1.	"Tú Amor"	Kike Santander	04:33
2.	"Engáñame"	Rudy Perez	04:27
3.	"Cómo Pude Haber Vivido Sin Tí"	Mario Patiño	04:41
4.	"Escondidos (Duet With Cristian Castro)"	Cristian Castro	04:29
5.	"Hielo Y Fuego"	Santander	03:24
6.	"Diálogo Mudo"	Daniel Frieberg, Walter Arenzon	03:30
7.	"El Niño"	Frieberg, Arenzon	03:42
8.	"Te Acordarás De Mí"	Yoel Henríquez	03:39
9.	"La Magia Del Ritmo [The Magic Of Rhythm]"	Marie-Claire D'Ubaldo, Richard Derbyshire, Frank Musker	04:05
10.	"Déjame Aprender"	Frieberg, Arenzon	03:39
11.	"Voy A Sacarte De Mi Mente"	Peter Cox, Martin Page, Richard Drummie	04:08
12.	"Un Hombre Y Una Mujer"	Santander	04:34

== Chart performance ==
Chart (1998)	Peak position
US Billboard Top Latin Albums	1
US Billboard Latin Pop Albums	1
US Billboard Top Heatseekers	1
US Billboard 200	111

== Sales and certifications ==
Region	Certification	Certified units/sales
United States (RIAA)	2× Platinum (Latin)	200,000^{^}
^{^} Shipments figures based on certification alone.

== See also ==
- List of number-one Billboard Top Latin Albums from the 1990s
- List of number-one Billboard Latin Pop Albums from the 1990s
