= Ferenc Török (director) =

Hungarian film director (born 1971)

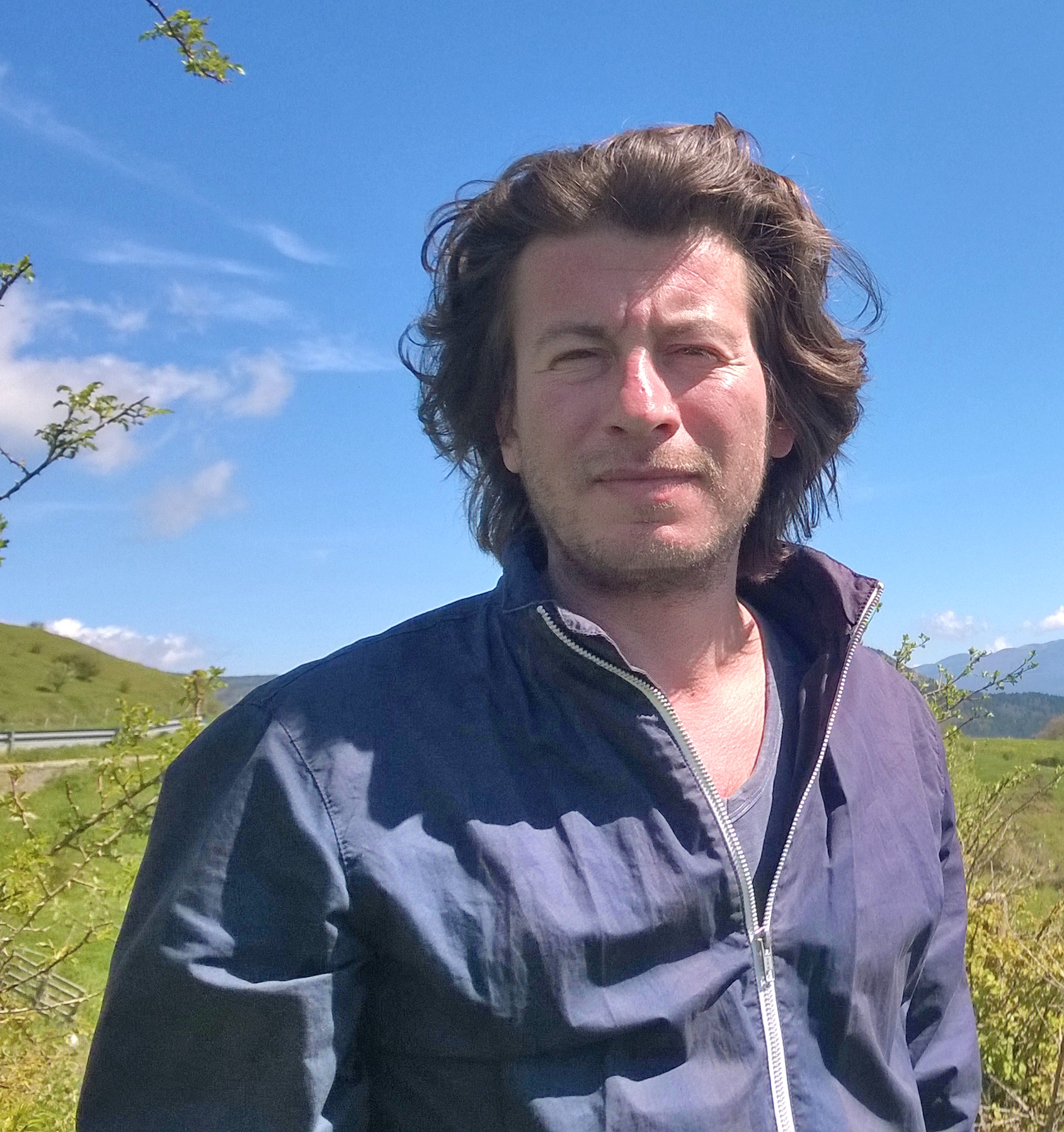
Török Ferenc, 2014

Ferenc Török (born Budapest, 23 April 1971) is a Hungarian film director. He has received Béla Balázs Award, a state recognition for outstanding achievement in filmmaking. Török is a member of the European Film Academy.

== Education ==
In 1995, he was admitted to the Academy of Drama and Film in Budapest. His final graduation project film, Moscow Square, won the "Best First Film" award at the Hungarian Film Festival in 2000.

== Filmography ==
=== Director (21 credits) ===
- Tranzit (1999)
- Valaki kopog (2000)
- Moscow Square (2001)
- A Bus Came... (2003)
- Eastern Sugar (2004)
- Európából Európába (2004)
- Von den Sockeln (2004)
- A Pál utcai fiúk (2005)
- A Day Off (2005)
- Csodálatos vadállatok (2005)
- Overnight (2007)
- HVG30 (2009)
- Koccanás (2009)
- Logbook '89–'09 (2009)
- Apacsok (2010)
- Istanbul (Isztambul) (2011)
- East Side Stories (2012)
- Magyarország 2011 (2011)
- Hegyek és tengerek köztt: Samira (2013)
- Brigád (2013)
- Senki szigete (2014)
- 1945 (2016)

=== Writer (15 credits) ===
- Tranzit (1999)
- Valaki kopog (2000)
- Moscow Square (2001)
- A Bus Came... (2003)
- Eastern Sugar (2004)
- A Day Off (2005)
- Csodálatos vadállatok (2005)
- Overnight (2007)
- HVG30 (2009)
- Logbook '89-09' (2009)
- Isztambul (2011)
- East Side Stories (2012)
- Magyarország 2011 (2012)
- Hegyek és tengerek köztt: Samira (2013)
- Brigád (2013)

=== Second Unit Director/Assistant Director (1 credit) ===
- Valaki kopog (2009)
