= Juan Gabriel discography =

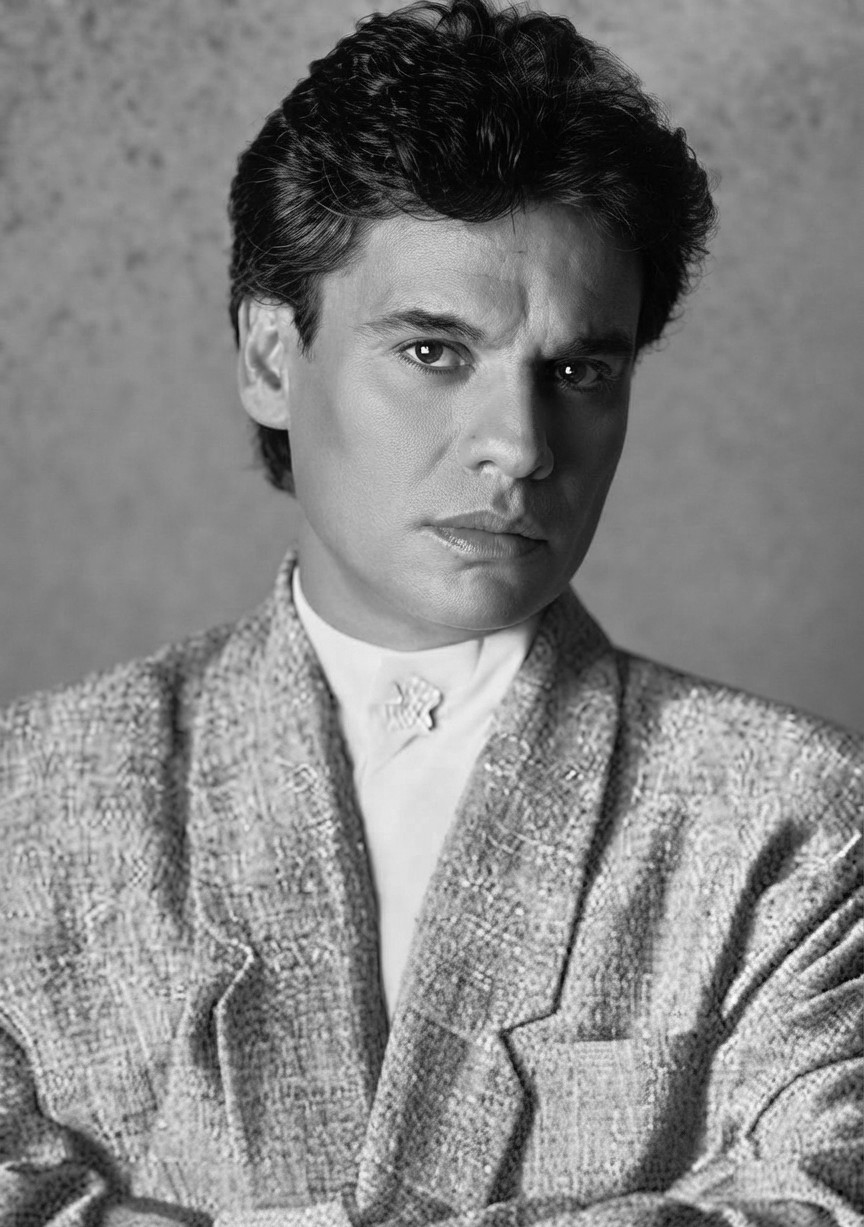
Juan Gabriel in 1985

The following is the discography of Mexican singer Juan Gabriel. Dubbed the "King of Latin Pop", he has sold over 100 million records worldwide, making him the best-selling Mexican artist of all time.

Billboard ranked Gabriel as the 7th Greatest Latin Artist of all time. He has achieved 7 No. 1 songs on the Hot Latin Songs chart and 6 No. 1 albums on the Latin Pop Albums chart. According to Neilsen Music, he has sold 3 million albums in the United States since 1991. 2015's Los Duo was the best-selling Latin album of 2015, selling 138,000 units in the US. 1984's Recuerdos, Vol. II is one of the best selling albums of all time in Mexico with sales of 8 million copies worldwide.

== Discography ==
=== Studio albums ===
- 1971: El Alma Joven... (RCA Records/Arcano Records)
- 1972: El Alma Joven Vol.II (RCA Records/Arcano Records)
- 1973: El Alma Joven Vol.III (RCA Records/Arcano Records)
- 1974: Juan Gabriel con el Mariachi Vargas De Tecalitlán (RCA Records/Arcano Records)
- 1975: 10 Éxitos de Juan Gabriel (RCA Records/Arcano Records)
- 1976: A Mi Guitarra (RCA Records/Arcano Records)
- 1976: Juan Gabriel con Mariachi Vol. II (RCA Records/Arcano Records)
- 1978: Te Llegará Mi Olvido (RCA Records/Arcano Records)
- 1978: Siempre en Mi Mente (RCA Records/Arcano Records)
- 1978: Espectacular (Ariola Records/Pronto Records)
- 1978: Mis Ojos Tristes (Ariola Records/Pronto Records)
- 1979: Me Gusta Bailar Contigo (Ariola Records/Pronto Records)
- 1980: Recuerdos (Ariola Records/Pronto Records)
- 1980: Juan Gabriel Con Mariachi (Ariola Records/Pronto Records)
- 1980: Ella (RCA Records/Arcano Records)
- 1981: Con Tu Amor (Ariola Records/Pronto Records)
- 1982: Cosas De Enamorados (Ariola Records/Pronto Records)
- 1983: Todo (Ariola Records)
- 1984: Recuerdos, Vol.II (Ariola Records)
- 1986: Pensamientos (Ariola Records)
- 1994: Gracias por Esperar (Ariola BMG)
- 1995: El México Que Se Nos Fue (Ariola BMG)
- 1997: Juntos Otra Vez with Rocío Dúrcal (RCA)
- 1998: Con la Banda...El Recodo with Banda El Recodo (RCA)
- 1999: Todo Está Bien (RCA)
- 2000: Abrázame Muy Fuerte (RCA)
- 2003: Inocente de Ti (Sony Music Latin)
- 2010: Juan Gabriel (Universal Music Mexico)
- 2010: Boleros (Universal Music/Fonovisa)
- 2015: Los Dúo (Universal Music/Fonovisa)
- 2015: Los Dúo, Vol. 2 (Universal Music/Fonovisa)
- 2016: Vestido de Etiqueta por Eduardo Magallanes (Universal Music/Fonovisa)
- 2022: Los Dúo, Vol. 3 (Universal Music/Fonovisa/Virgin Records)

=== Soundtracks ===
- 1979: En Esta Primavera (Juan Gabriel Canta las Canciones de Su Película)
- 1996: Del Otro Lado del Puente
- 1997: Te Sigo Amando

=== Compilations, duets and live albums ===
- 1975: 10 Exitos De Juan Gabriel
- 1978: Siempre Estoy Pensando en Ti
- 1978: Baladas
- 1981: 15 Exitos de Juan Gabriel
- 1982: Los 15 Grandes Exitos de Juan Gabriel
- 1983: Los Mejor De Juan Gabriel Con Mariachi
- 1984: Frente a Frente, Vol. 1
- 1985: Juan Gabriel
- 1986: 15 Anos De Exitos Rancheros
- 1987: Frente a Frente, Vol. 2
- 1987: 15 Anos, Baladas, Exitos
- 1988: Para Ti 14 Exitos Originales
- 1988: Debo Hacerlo
- 1990: Juan Gabriel en el Palacio de Bellas Artes
- 1996: 25 Aniversario: Solos, Duetos Y Versiones Especiales
- 1998: Celebrando 25 Años de Juan Gabriel: En Concierto en el Palacio de Bellas Artes
- 1998: Por Mi Orgullo
- 1999: ¡Románticos! with Rocío Dúrcal
- 2001: Por Los Siglos
- 2004: El Unico: Sus Más Grandes Exitos
- 2006: La Historia del Divo
- 2007: Los Gabriel... Simplemente Amigos with Ana Gabriel
- 2008: Los Gabriel: Cantan a México with Ana Gabriel
- 2008: Los Gabriel... Para ti with Ana Gabriel
- 2008: El Divo Canta A México
- 2009: Mis Canciones, Mis Amigos
- 2010: Mis Favoritas
- 2010: Boleros
- 2012: Celebrando
- 2013: Los Gabriel: Frente A Frente with Ana Gabriel
- 2014: Mis 40 en Bellas Artes
- 2014: Mis Número 1...40 Aniversario
- 2015: Te Acuerdas 20 Nostalgicas
- 2015: El Divo Y Sus Divas
- 2016: Juan Gabriel Dúos & Interpretaciones
- 2016: Mi Historia Musical
- 2023: México con Escalas en Mi Corazón (Ciudades)

=== Singles ===
Year	Single	México Charts	Hot Latin Songs	Album
1971	No Tengo Dinero	#1	—	El Alma Joven
1971	Me He Quedado Solo	#5	—	El Alma Joven
1972	Uno Dos Y Tres (Y Me Das Un Beso)	—	—	El Alma Joven II
1972	Será Mañana	#1	—	El Alma Joven II
1972	Te Busco, Te Extraño	—	—	El Alma Joven II
1972	Sólo Sé Que Fue En Marzo	—	—	El Alma Joven II
1972	Tú Que Fuiste	—	—	El Alma Joven II
1973	En Esta Primavera	#4	—	El Alma Joven III
1973	Esta Rosa Roja	#2	—	El Alma Joven III
1973	Nada Ni Nadie	—	—	El Alma Joven III
1973	Qué Divino Amor	—	—	El Alma Joven III
1974	Que Sea Mi Condena	#5	—	Con El Mariachi Tecalitlan
1974	Se Me Olvidó Otra Vez	#1	—	Con El Mariachi Tecalitlan
1974	Lágrimas Y lluvia	#1	—	Con El Mariachi Tecalitlan
1974	Qué Chasco Me Llevé	—	—	Con El Mariachi Tecalitlan
1974	Mañana te Acordarás	—	—	Con El Mariachi Tecalitlan
1975	Iremos De La Mano	—	—	10 Exitos De Juan Gabriel
1975	No Se Ha Dado Cuenta	—	—	10 Exitos De Juan Gabriel
1975	Por Creer En Ti	—	—	10 Exitos De Juan Gabriel
1975	Te Propongo Matrimonio	#6	—	A Mi Guitarra
1975	A Mi Guitarra	#1	—	A Mi Guitarra
1975	Nuestro Amor Es El Más Bello Del Mundo	—	—	A Mi Guitarra
1976	Tu Abandono	—	—	Los 10 Exitos De Juan Gabriel
1976	Tenías Que Ser Tan Cruel	—	—	Los 10 Exitos De Juan Gabriel
1976	Te Voy A Olvidar	—	—	Con El Mariachi: Vol II
1976	Ya No Vuelvo A Molestarte	—	—	Con El Mariachi: Vol II
1976	17 Años (Con Estela Núñez)	—	—	Con El Mariachi: Vol II
1976	Ases Y Tercia De Reyes	—	—	Con El Mariachi: Vol II
1976	Ya No Insistas Corazón	—	—	Con El Mariachi: Vol II
1976	Nuestros Corazones	—	—	Con El Mariachi: Vol II
1977	Te Llegará Mi Olvido	—	—	Con El Mariachi: Te Llegara Mi Olvido
1977	Despierto A Mi Realidad	—	—	Con El Mariachi: Te Llegara Mi Olvido
1977	Con Un Poco De Amor	—	—	Con El Mariachi: Te Llegara Mi Olvido
1977	María María	—	—	Con El Mariachi: Te Llegara Mi Olvido
1977	Siempre En Mi Mente	#1	—	Siempre En Mi Mente
1977	María María	—	—	Siempre En Mi Mente
1977	Denme Un Ride	—	—	Siempre En Mi Mente
1977	Aunque Te Enamores	#1	—	Espectacular
1977	Mi Fracaso	#1	—	Espectacular
1977	Adiós Amor, Te Vas	#8	—	Espectacular
1977	Yo Sé Que Está En Tu Corazón	—	—	Espectacular
1977	Con Todo Y Mi Tristeza	—	—	Con El Mariachi: Mis Ojos Tristes
1977	Cuando Quieras Déjame	—	—	Con El Mariachi: Mis Ojos Tristes
1977	Mi Ojos Tristes	—	—	Con El Mariachi: Mis Ojos Tristes
1979	Me Gusta Bailar Contigo	—	—	Me Gusta Bailar Contigo
1979	Buenos Días Señor Sol	#4	—	Me Gusta Bailar Contigo
1979	Nadie Baila Como Tú	—	—	Me Gusta Bailar Contigo
1979	Cuando Vuelvas A México	—	—	Me Gusta Bailar Contigo
1980	He Venido A Pedirte Perdón	#1	—	Recuerdos
1980	El Noa Noa	#1	—	Recuerdos
1980	Yo No Nací Para Amar	#4	—	Recuerdos
1980	Lástima Es Mi Mujer	—	—	Recuerdos
1980	Inocente Pobre Amigo	—	—	Con Mariachi
1980	La Diferencia	—	—	Con Mariachi
1980	Lo Que Quiero	—	—	Con Mariachi
1980	Hoy Por Fin	—	—	Ella
1980	Ella	—	—	Ella
1981	Con Tu Amor	#3	—	Con Tu Amor
1981	Canta Canta	—	—	Con Tu Amor
1981	Karina	—	—	Con Tu Amor
1982	No Me Vuelvo A Enamorar	#4	—	Cosas De Enamorados
1982	Insensible	#1	—	Cosas De Enamorados
1983	Ya Lo Sé Que Tú Te Vas	#9	—	Cosas De Enamorados
1983	Si Quieres	—	—	Cosas De Enamorados
1983	No Vale La Pena	#3	—	Todo
1983	Caray	#1	—	Todo
1983	La Farsante	#8	—	Todo
1983	Tengo Que Olvidar	—	—	Todo
1984	Querida	#1	#4	Recuerdos II
1984	Bésame	—	—	Recuerdos II
1984	Déjame Vivir (con Rocío Dúrcal)	#1	—	Dejame Vivir (Sencillo)
1986	Yo No Sé Qué Me Pasó	#3	#1	Pensamientos
1986	Te Lo Pido Por Favor	#10	—	Pensamientos
1986	Hasta Que Te Conocí	#8	#2	Pensamientos
1986	Qué Lástima	—	#8	Pensamientos
1986	Sólo Sé Que Fue Un Marzo	—	#27	Pensamientos
1988	Debo Hacerlo	#1	#1	Debo Hacerlo
1990	Hasta Que Te Conocí (Popurri)	#1	#10	En El Palacio De Bellas Artes
1990	Mi Más Bello Error	—	—	En El Palacio De Bellas Artes
1990	Yo Te Perdono	—	—	En El Palacio De Bellas Artes
1990	De Mí Enamórate	—	—	En El Palacio De Bellas Artes
1990	Amor Eterno	—	#19	En El Palacio De Bellas Artes
1994	Pero Qué Necesidad	#1	#1	Gracias Por Esperar
1994	Lentamente	#1	#8	Gracias Por Esperar
1994	Muriendo De Amor	—	—	Gracias Por Esperar
1994	Vienes O Voy	—	—	Gracias Por Esperar
1996	El México Que Se Nos Fue	—	—	El Mexico Que Se Nos Fue
1996	Mi Bendita Tierra	—	#16	El Mexico Que Se Nos Fue
1996	El Palo	—	#1	El Mexico Que Se Nos Fue
1996	Canción 187	—	#9	El Mexico Que Se Nos Fue
1996	Mi Pueblo (con Paul Anka)	—	#8	Amigos
1997	Te Sigo Amando	#1	#1	Te Sigo Amando (Sencillo)
1997	Así Son Los Hombres (con Rocío Dúrcal)	—	—	Juntos Otra Vez
1997	El Destino (con Rocío Dúrcal)	—	#1	Juntos Otra Vez
1997	La Incertidumbre (con Rocío Dúrcal)	—	#11	Juntos Otra Vez
1997	Qué Bonito Es Santa Fe (con Rocío Dúrcal)	—	—	Juntos Otra Vez
1997	Te Sigo Amando (con Rocío Dúrcal)	—	—	Juntos Otra Vez
1997	El Verdadero Amor (con Rocío Dúrcal)	—	—	Juntos Otra Vez
1998	Así Fue (En Vivo)	#1	#3	Celebrando 25 Años de Juan Gabriel En El Palacio de Bellas Artes
1998	Queriendo Y No (En Vivo)	—	—	Celebrando 25 Años de Juan Gabriel En El Palacio de Bellas Artes
1998	Sin Dinero Y Con Guitarra (Medley) (En Vivo)	—	—	Celebrando 25 Años de Juan Gabriel En El Palacio de Bellas Artes
1998	Querida (con Raul Di Blasio)	—	#10	Desde Mexico Raul Di Blacio El Piano De America
1998	Adorable Mentirosa (con La Banda El Recodo)	—	#11	Con Banda... El Recodo!!!! de Cruz Lizaraga
1999	Te Doy Las Gracias (con La Banda El Recodo)	—	#43	Con Banda... El Recodo!!!! de Cruz Lizaraga
1999	Infidelidad (con La Banda El Recodo)	—	#27	Con Banda... El Recodo!!!! de Cruz Lizaraga
1999	El Sinaloense (con La Banda El Recodo)	—	#14	Con Banda... El Recodo!!!! de Cruz Lizaraga
1999	Huérfano Soy (con La Banda El Recodo)	—	—	Con Banda... El Recodo!!!! de Cruz Lizaraga
1999	Todo Está Bien	—	#14	Todo Esta Bien
1999	Dame Tu Mano	—	—	Todo Esta Bien
1999	Dame Tu Mano (Remix)	—	—	Todo Esta Bien
1999	La Mujer Que Yo Amo	—	—	Todo Esta Bien
1999	No Apaguen La Luz	—	—	Todo Esta Bien
2000	Abrázame Muy Fuerte	—	#1	Abrázame Muy Fuerte
2001	A Mí Me Gusta Soñar	—	—	Abrázame Muy Fuerte
2001	El Amor De Nosotros (a Dúo Con Tamara)	—	—	Abrázame Muy Fuerte
2001	No Vale La Pena (con Nydia)	—	#9	Nydia
2001	Siempre En Mi Mente (con Nydia)	—	—	Nydia
2001	Inocente Pobre Amigo (Versión 2001)	—	#7	Por Los Siglos
2001	Pero Qué Necesidad (2001 Version)	—	—	Por Los Siglos
2001	Te Sigo Amando (2001 Versión)	—	—	Por Los Siglos
2001	Yo Te Recuerdo (con Los Nocheros)	—	—	Yo Te Recuerdo (Sencillo)
2003	No Tengo Dinero (con A.B. Quintanilla Y Los Kumbia Kings)	—	#5	4
2003	Inocente De Ti	—	#11	Inocente De Ti
2003	Cómo Te Quiero Mi Amor	—	—	Inocente De Ti
2003	Yo Te Recuerdo	—	—	Inocente De Ti
2010	¿Por qué Me Haces Llorar?	—	#21	Juan Gabriel
2010	Gracias Al Amor	—	#14	Juan Gabriel
2010	Pase Lo Que Pase	—	#25	Boleros (only in Mexico)
2014	El Noa Noa	—	#22	Mis 40 En Bellas Artes
2015	Querida (con Juanes)	—	#46	Los Duo
2015	Yo Te Bendigo Mi Amor (con David Bisbal)	—	—	Los Duo
2016	Ya No Vivo Por Vivir (con Natalia Lafourcade)	—	—	Los Duo
2016	Se Me Olvidó Otra Vez (con Marco Antonio Solís)	—	—	Los Duo
2016	Así Fue (con Isabel Pantoja)	—	—	Los Duo
2016	Abrázame Muy Fuerte (con Laura Pausini)	—	—	Los Duo
2016	Si Quieres (con Natalia Jiménez)	—	—	Los Duo
2016	Te Quise Olvidar (con Alejandro Fernández)	—	#46	Los Duo II
2016	La Frontera (feat. Julión Álvares & J. Balvin)	—	#32	Los Duo II
2016	Yo Te Recuerdo (con Marc Anthony)	—	#16	Los Duo II
2016	No Discutamos (con Paty Cantú)	—	—	Los Duo II
2016	Te Recuerdo Dulcemente (con Andrés Calamaro)	—	—	Los Duo II
2016	No Tengo Dinero (con Wisin)	—	—	Los Duo II
2016	Te Sigo Amando (con Belinda)	—	—	Los Duo II
2016	Ya Lo Sé Que Tú Te Vas (con Franco De Vita)	—	—	Los Duo II
2016	Have You Ever Seen The Rain (Gracias Al Sol)	—	#41	Quero Creedence
2016	No Tengas Miedo	—	—	Vestido De Etiqueta
2016	La Muerte Del Palomo	—	—	Vestido De Etiqueta
2016	Hasta Que Te Conocí (de la Serie Juan Gabriel)	—	—	Vestido De Etiqueta
2016	Se Me Olvidó Otra Vez	—	—	Vestido De Etiqueta
2016	Ya Lo Sé Que Tú Te Vas	—	—	Vestido De Etiqueta
2016	Si Quieres	—	—	Vestido De Etiqueta
2022	Déjame Vivir (con Anahí)	—	—	Los Duo III
