= List of awards and nominations received by Juan Gabriel =

Juan Gabriel awards and nominations
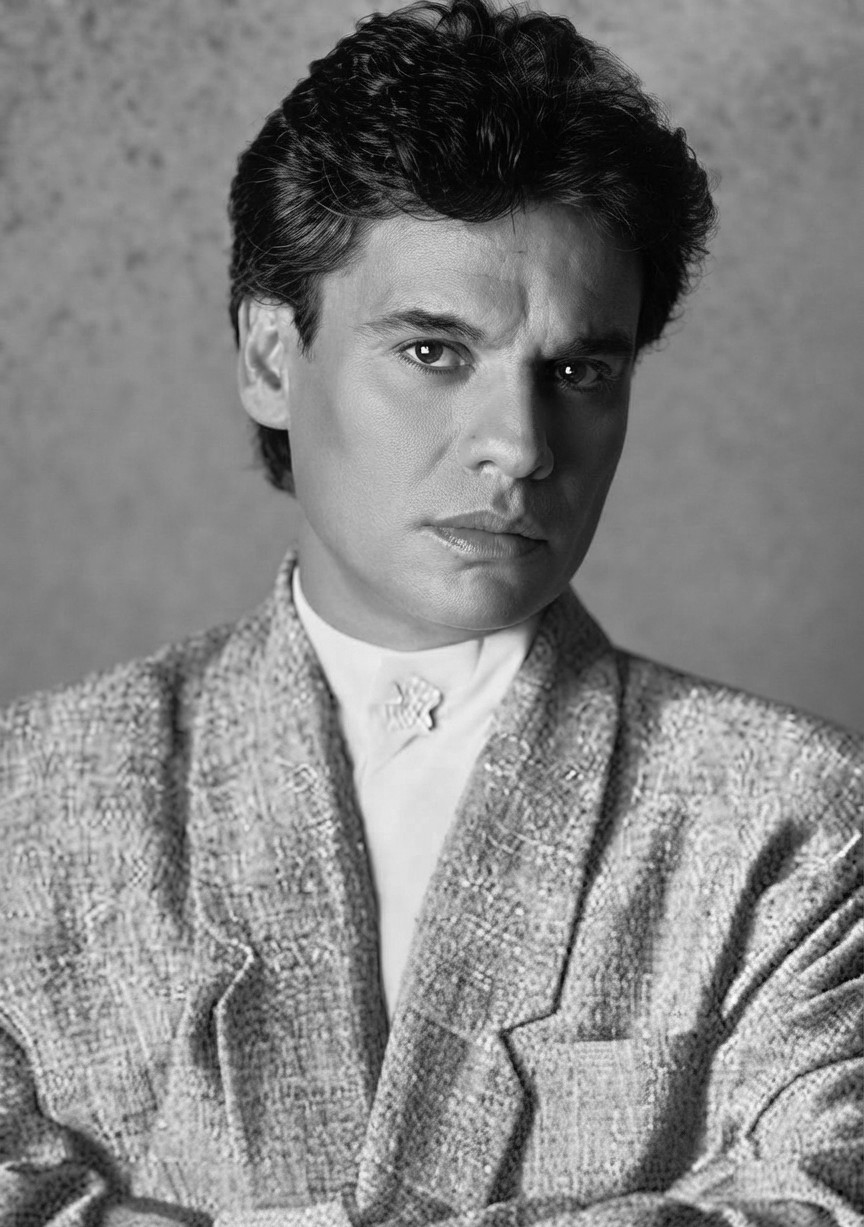
- Gabriel in 1985
Awards and nominations
Award	Wins	Nominations
ASCAP Latin Award	15	15
Billboard Latin Music Awards	18	30
Billboard Music Awards	3	8
El Heraldo de México Awards	4	4
Grammy Awards	0	6
Latin Grammy Awards	2	5
Latin American Music Awards	0	8
Lo Nuestro Awards	9	27

Totals (Note: Certain award groups do not simply award one winner. They acknowledge several different recipients, have runners-up, and have third place. Since this is a specific recognition and is different from losing an award, runner-up mentions are considered wins in this award tally. For simplification and to avoid errors, each award in this list has been presumed to have had a prior nomination.)
- Wins: 131
- Nominations: 231

Juan Gabriel (1950–2016) was a Mexican singer-songwriter who received various awards and nominations during his lifetime spanning six decades in media, and posthumously. He is one of the all-time best-selling Latin musicians.

Juan Gabriel received his first major national awards in his early career in the 1970s, winning various Calendario Azteca de Oro and El Heraldo de México Awards. Beginning in the 1980s, he won various Latin ACE awards from the Association of Latin Entertainment Critics in New York, achieved his first Grammy Awards nominations, and obtained nominations in the Billboard Number One Awards. Through the 1990s, he achieved more accolades from majors organizations, including various ASCAP Latin Awards, as well as Lo Nuestro Awards and the Billboard Latin Music Awards. He became the first Hispanic Songwriter of the Year by the ASCAP in 1995. Since the 2000s, Juan Gabriel achieved various other nominations and awards, including from Latin Grammy and Premios Juventud. In 2009, The Latin Recording Academy named him Person of the Year.

Juan Gabriel's career and success have been recognized in various ceremony awards, among them, two special Lo Nuestro Awards, including the Excellence Award in 1991, a special Premios Ondas in 2001, and a Latin Billboard Star Award in 2016.

He has also received a number of government recognitions, including by the King of Spain, Juan Carlos I in 2006 with a Universal Excellence Award, and a Golden Laurel. Gabriel has been admitted into various hall and walk of Fames as well.

== Awards and nominations ==
Award/organization (Note: Charts are not included, unless they are explicitly described as "awards" or specific trophies are given.)	Year	Nominee/work	Category	Result	Ref.
ASCAP Latin Awards	1994	"Popurrí de Boleros"	Award-Winning Songs	Won	
ASCAP Latin Awards	1994	"Hasta Que Te Conocí"	Tropical Winning-Songs	Won	
ASCAP Latin Awards	1995	Juan Gabriel	Songwriter of the Year	Won	
ASCAP Latin Awards	1995	Juan Gabriel	Pop Songwriter of the Year	Won	
ASCAP Latin Awards	1995	"Pero Qué Necesidad"	Pop Contemporary Songs of the Year	Won	
ASCAP Latin Awards	1995	"Luna"	Pop Contemporary Songs of the Year	Won	
ASCAP Latin Awards	1995	"Mañana, Mañana"	Award-Winning Songs	Won	
ASCAP Latin Awards	1996	Juan Gabriel	Songwriter of the Year	Won	
ASCAP Latin Awards	1997	"Si Quieres"	Tejano/Regional Mexican Songs	Won	
ASCAP Latin Awards	1998	Juan Gabriel	Latin Songwriter of the Year	Won	
ASCAP Latin Awards	1998	"El Destino"	Pop/Balada Song of the Year	Won	
ASCAP Latin Awards	1998	"Te Sigo Amando"	Pop/Balada Song of the Year	Won	
ASCAP Latin Awards	1999	"Así Fue"	Super Song of the Year	Honoree	
ASCAP Latin Awards	2002	"Abrázame Muy Fuerte"	Super Song of the Year	Honoree	
ASCAP Latin Awards	2013	"Hasta Que Te Conocí"	Pop Winning-Songs	Won	
Asociación de Hispanos (Nosotros)	1991	Juan Gabriel	Legend Award	Honoree	
Asociación de Hispanos (Nosotros)	1997	Juan Gabriel	Golden Eagle: Humanitarian Award	Honoree	
Asociación Internacional de Periodistas de Radio, Prensa y Televisión de Las Vegas	2016	Juan Gabriel	Diamond Award	Honoree	
Asociación Mexicana de Productores de Fonogramas y Videogramas (AMPROFON)	c. 1985	Juan Gabriel	Amprofón de Oro	Honoree	
Association of Latin Entertainment Critics (Latin ACE)	1981	Juan Gabriel	Composer of the Year	Nominated	
Association of Latin Entertainment Critics (Latin ACE)	1985	Juan Gabriel	Composer of the Year	Won	
Association of Latin Entertainment Critics (Latin ACE)	1989	Juan Gabriel	International Artist of the Year	Nominated	
Association of Latin Entertainment Critics (Latin ACE)	1990	Juan Gabriel	International Artist of the Year	Won	
Association of Latin Entertainment Critics (Latin ACE)	1991	Juan Gabriel	International Artist of the Year	Won	
Association of Latin Entertainment Critics (Latin ACE)	1992	Juan Gabriel	International Artist of the Year	Won	
Association of Latin Entertainment Critics (Latin ACE)	1994	Juan Gabriel en el Rose Bowl	Best Variety Special	Won	
Association of Latin Entertainment Critics (Latin ACE)	1995	Juan Gabriel	Composer of the Year	Won	
Association of Latin Entertainment Critics (Latin ACE)	1995	Juan Gabriel (Radio City Music Hall)	Best Concert	Won	
Association of Latin Entertainment Critics (Latin ACE)	1996	Juan Gabriel	Best Concert Album of the Year	Nominated	
Association of Latin Entertainment Critics (Latin ACE)	1997	Juan Gabriel	Best Show	Won	
Association of Latin Entertainment Critics (Latin ACE)	1997	Juan Gabriel	Composer of the Year	Won	
Association of Latin Entertainment Critics (Latin ACE)	1998	Juan Gabriel	Composer of the Year	Nominated	
Association of Latin Entertainment Critics (Latin ACE)	1999	Juan Gabriel & Fernandito Villalona (MSG)	Best Show	Nominated	
Billboard Latin Music Awards	1998	Juntos Otra Vez (with Rocío Dúrcal)	Billboard Latin 50 Album of The Year	Honoree	
Billboard Latin Music Awards	1999	Juan Gabriel	Songwriter of the Year	Nominated	
Billboard Latin Music Awards	2000	Juan Gabriel	Songwriter of the Year	Nominated	
Billboard Latin Music Awards	2002	Juan Gabriel	Songwriter of the Year	Won	
Billboard Latin Music Awards	2002	Juan Gabriel	Hot Latin Tracks Artist of The Year:	Nominated	
Billboard Latin Music Awards	2002	"Abrázame Muy Fuerte"	Hot Latin Track of The Year	Won	
Billboard Latin Music Awards	2002	"Abrázame Muy Fuerte"	Latin Pop Airplay Track of The Year	Won	
Billboard Latin Music Awards	2002	"No Vale La Pena" (with Nydia Rojas)	Hot Latin Track of The Year, Vocal Duo	Won	
Billboard Latin Music Awards	2006	Juan Gabriel	Songwriter of the Year	Won	
Billboard Latin Music Awards	2006	Juan Gabriel	Latin Tour of the Year	Nominated	
Billboard Latin Music Awards	2007	La Historia Del Divo	Latin Greatest Hits Album of the Year	Nominated	
Billboard Latin Music Awards	2015	Juan Gabriel	Tour of the Year	Nominated	
Billboard Latin Music Awards	2015	Juan Gabriel	Top Latin Albums Artist of the Year, Male	Nominated	
Billboard Latin Music Awards	2015	Juan Gabriel	Regional Mexican Albums Artist of the Year, Solo	Nominated	
Billboard Latin Music Awards	2015	Mis 40 en Bellas Artes	Regional Mexican Album of the Year	Nominated	
Billboard Latin Music Awards	2016	Juan Gabriel	Artist of the Year	Won	
Billboard Latin Music Awards	2016	Juan Gabriel	Tour of the Year	Won	
Billboard Latin Music Awards	2016	Juan Gabriel	Top Latin Albums Artist of the Year, Male	Won	
Billboard Latin Music Awards	2016	Juan Gabriel	Latin Pop Albums Artist of the Year, Solo	Won	
Billboard Latin Music Awards	2016	Juan Gabriel	Billboard/Telemundo Star	Honoree	
Billboard Latin Music Awards	2016	Los Dúo	Top Latin Album of the Year	Won	
Billboard Latin Music Awards	2016	Los Dúo	Latin Pop Album of the Year	Won	
Billboard Latin Music Awards	2016	Mis Número 1...40 Aniversario	Latin Pop Album of the Year	Nominated	
Billboard Latin Music Awards	2017	Juan Gabriel	Artist of the Year	Won	
Billboard Latin Music Awards	2017	Juan Gabriel	Top Latin Albums Artist of the Year, Male	Won	
Billboard Latin Music Awards	2017	Juan Gabriel	Latin Pop Albums Artist of the Year, Solo	Won	
Billboard Latin Music Awards	2017	Los Dúo, Vol. 2	Top Latin Album of the Year	Won	
Billboard Latin Music Awards	2017	Los Dúo, Vol. 2	Latin Pop Album of the Year	Won	
Billboard Latin Music Awards	2017	Vestido de Etiqueta por Eduardo Magallanes	Top Latin Album of the Year	Nominated	
Billboard Latin Music Awards	2017	Vestido de Etiqueta por Eduardo Magallanes	Latin Pop Album of the Year	Nominated	
Billboard Number One Awards (Note: Prior to the inauguration of the Billboard Music Awards in 1990, the magazine had the "Number One Awards" to honor the top-performing artists of the year on each of chart categories.)	1977	Con Mariachi	Latin Pop National	2nd place	
Billboard Number One Awards	1977	Con Mariachi, Vol. 2	Latin Pop National	Nominated	
Billboard Number One Awards	1977	Con Mariachi, Vol. 2	Chicago Pop	Nominated	
Billboard Number One Awards	1977	Con Mariachi, Vol. 2	San Antonio Pop	Nominated	
Billboard Number One Awards	1977	Con Mariachi, Vol. 2	Los Angeles Pop	Nominated	
Billboard Number One Awards	1978	Espectacular	Top Latin Pop Album	Won	
Billboard Number One Awards	1979	Con Mariachi	Top Latin Pop Album	Nominated	
Billboard Number One Awards	1987	Juan Gabriel	Top Pop Latin Artist	Nominated	
Billboard Number One Awards	1987	Pensamientos	Top Pop Latin Album	Nominated	
Billboard Number One Awards	1987	"Hasta Que Te Conocí"	Top Hot Latin Track	Nominated	
Billboard Number One Awards	1988	Juan Gabriel	Top Pop Latin Artist	Nominated	
Billboard Number One Awards	1988	14 Exitos Originales: Para Ti	Top Pop Latin Album	Nominated	
Billboard Number One Awards	1988	"Debo Hacerlo"	Top Hot Latin Track	Nominated	
Billboard Number One Awards	1989	Debo Hacerlo	Top Pop Latin Album	Nominated	
Billboard Music Awards	2015	Juan Gabriel	Top Latin Artist	Nominated	
Billboard Music Awards	2015	Los Dúo	Top Latin Album	Nominated	
Billboard Music Awards	2016	Juan Gabriel	Top Latin Artist	Nominated	
Billboard Music Awards	2016	Los Dúo	Top Latin Album	Won	
Billboard Music Awards	2016	Mis Número 1...40 Aniversario	Top Latin Album	Nominated	
Billboard Music Awards	2017	Juan Gabriel	Top Latin Artist	Won	
Billboard Music Awards	2017	Los Dúo, Vol. 2	Top Latin Album	Won	
Billboard Music Awards	2017	Vestido de Etiqueta por Eduardo Magallanes	Top Latin Album	Nominated	
Brownsville Chamber of Commerce	1984	Juan Gabriel	Mister Amigo (Note: A collaborative effort by cities of Brownsvile, Texas, and Matamoros, Tamaulipas established in 1964 to honor Mexican figures in sports, politics, business, culture and the artistic scene)	Honoree	
Calendario Azteca de Oro (Note: transl. Aztec Gold Calendar, an award given by the Asociación Mexicana de Periodistas de Radio y Televisión (AMPRyT))	1976	Se Me Olvidó Otra Vez	Album of the Year	Won	
Calendario Azteca de Oro	1977	Juan Gabriel	Songwriter of the Year — Ranchero	Nominated	
Calendario Azteca de Oro	1978	Juan Gabriel	Composer of the Year	Won	
Calendario Azteca de Oro	1978	Siempre en Mi Mente	National Album of the Year	Won	
Cuerpo Consular de Latinoamérica y el Caribe (GRULAC)	2005	Juan Gabriel	Honorary Plaque	Honoree	
Disco de Oro de Hollywood (Note: An award celebrated in Los Angeles, and organized by music producer Antonio de Marco and Alfredo Garcia according to La Opinión.)	1973	Juan Gabriel	Winning-Artists	Nominated	
Disco de Oro de Hollywood	1975	Juan Gabriel	Winning-Artists	Won	
Disco de Oro de Hollywood	1976	Juan Gabriel	Winning-Artists	Won	
El Heraldo de México Awards	1974	Juan Gabriel	Composer of the Year	Won	
El Heraldo de México Awards	1978	Siempre en Mi Mente	Album of the Year	Won	
El Heraldo de México Awards	1984	Juan Gabriel	Artist of the Year	Won	
El Heraldo de México Awards	2001	"Abrázame Muy Fuerte"	Best Musical Theme	Won	
Grammy Awards	1984	Todo	Best Mexican/Mexican-American Album	Nominated	
Grammy Awards	1985	Recuerdos II	Best Mexican/Mexican-American Album	Nominated	
Grammy Awards	1995	Gracias por Esperar	Best Latin Pop Album	Nominated	
Grammy Awards	1996	El México Que Se Nos Fue	Best Mexican-American/Tejano Music Performance	Nominated	
Grammy Awards	1999	Celebrando 25 Años de Juan Gabriel: En Concierto en el Palacio de Bellas Artes	Best Latin Pop Performance	Nominated	
Grammy Awards	2002	Abrázame Muy Fuerte	Best Latin Pop Album	Nominated	
Hispanic Heritage Foundation	2005	Juan Gabriel	Hispanic Heritage Awards	Honoree	
Hispanic Heritage Society (HHH)	2005	Juan Gabriel	Tito Guízar Award	Honoree	
Hispanic Heritage Society (HHH)	2005	Juan Gabriel	Emissary of the Muses	Honoree	
Latin American Music Awards	2015	Los Dúo	Favorite Album of the Year	Nominated	
Latin American Music Awards	2015	Mis Número 1...40 Aniversario	Favorite Album of the Year	Nominated	
Latin American Music Awards	2015	Juan Gabriel	Favorite Pop/Rock Male Artist	Nominated	
Latin American Music Awards	2016	Juan Gabriel	Favorite Pop/Rock Male Artist	Nominated	
Latin American Music Awards	2016	Los Dúo, Vol. 2	Favorite Album of the Year	Nominated	
Latin American Music Awards	2016	Los Dúo, Vol. 2	Favorite Pop/Rock Album	Nominated	
Latin American Music Awards	2017	Vestido de Etiqueta por Eduardo Magallanes	Favorite Album of the Year	Nominated	
Latin American Music Awards	2017	Vestido de Etiqueta por Eduardo Magallanes	Favorite Pop/Rock Album	Nominated	
La Guirnalda	1984	Juan Gabriel	Guirnalda de Oro (Gold Garland)	Honoree	
La Guirnalda	2006	Juan Gabriel	Guirnalda de Oro (Gold Garland)	Honoree	
Las Vegas Walk of Stars	2016	Juan Gabriel	Crown as "Perpetual King" of Mexican National Holidays	Honoree	
Latin Grammy Awards	2004	Inocente de Ti	Best Singer-Songwriter Album	Nominated	
Latin Grammy Awards	2010	Juan Gabriel	Best Ranchero Album	Nominated	
Latin Grammy Awards	2016	Los Dúo, Vol. 2	Album of the Year	Won	
Latin Grammy Awards	2016	Los Dúo, Vol. 2	Best Traditional Pop Vocal Album	Won	
Latin Grammy Awards	2017	Vestido de Etiqueta por Eduardo Magallanes	Best Traditional Pop Vocal Album	Nominated	
Lo Nuestro Awards	1991	Juan Gabriel	Excellence Award	Honoree	
Lo Nuestro Awards	1992	En el Palacio de Bellas Artes	Pop Album of the Year	Nominated	
Lo Nuestro Awards	1992	Juan Gabriel	Pop Male Artist of the Year	Nominated	
Lo Nuestro Awards	1995	Juan Gabriel	Pop Male Artist of the Year	Nominated	
Lo Nuestro Awards	1995	Gracias por Esperar	Pop Album of the Year	Nominated	
Lo Nuestro Awards	1995	"Pero Qué Necesidad"	Pop Song of the Year	Won	
Lo Nuestro Awards	1996	Juan Gabriel	Regional Mexican Male Artist of the Year	Nominated	
Lo Nuestro Awards	1996	El México Que Se Nos Fue	Regional Mexican Album of the Year	Won	
Lo Nuestro Awards	1996	"Canción 187"	Regional Mexican Song of the Year	Nominated	
Lo Nuestro Awards	1997	Juan Gabriel	Special Tribute Award	Honoree	
Lo Nuestro Awards	1997	Juan Gabriel	Regional Mexican Male Artist of the Year	Nominated	
Lo Nuestro Awards	1998	Juan Gabriel	Pop Male Artist of the Year	Nominated	
Lo Nuestro Awards	1998	Juan Gabriel	Regional Mexican Male Artist of the Year	Nominated	
Lo Nuestro Awards	1998	Juan Gabriel & Rocío Dúrcal	Pop Group or Duo of the Year	Won	
Lo Nuestro Awards	1998	Juntos Otra Vez	Regional Mexican Album of the Year	Won	
Lo Nuestro Awards	1998	"Te Sigo Amando"	Pop Song of the Year	Nominated	
Lo Nuestro Awards	1998	"El Destino" (with Rocío Dúrcal)	Pop Song of the Year	Nominated	
Lo Nuestro Awards	1999	Celebrando 25 Años de Juan Gabriel: En Concierto en el Palacio de Bellas Artes	Pop Album of the Year	Nominated	
Lo Nuestro Awards	2000	Juan Gabriel	Regional Mexican Male Artist of the Year	Nominated	
Lo Nuestro Awards	2002	Juan Gabriel	Pop Male Artist of the Year	Nominated	
Lo Nuestro Awards	2002	Juan Gabriel & Nydia Rojas	Pop Group or Duo of the Year	Nominated	
Lo Nuestro Awards	2002	Abrázame Muy Fuerte	Pop Album of the Year	Won	
Lo Nuestro Awards	2002	"Abrázame Muy Fuerte"	Pop Song of the Year	Won	
Lo Nuestro Awards	2004	Kumbia Kings, Juan Gabriel and El Gran Silencio	Regional Mexican Group or Duo of the Year	Won	
Lo Nuestro Awards	2004	"No Tengo Dinero" (with Kumbia Kings and El Gran Silencio)	Regional Mexican Song of the Year	Won	
Lo Nuestro Awards	2011	Juan Gabriel	Ranchero Artist of the Year	Nominated	
Lo Nuestro Awards	2016	Los Dúo (Deluxe Version)	Album of the Year	Nominated	
Library of Congress	2024	"Amor Eterno"	Preserved	Honoree	
Lunas del Auditorio	2005	Juan Gabriel	Best Mexican/Regional Act	Won	
Lunas del Auditorio	2006	Juan Gabriel	Best Mexican/Regional Act	Nominated	
Lunas del Auditorio	2007	Juan Gabriel	Best Mexican/Regional Act	Nominated	
Lunas del Auditorio	2008	Juan Gabriel	Best Mexican/Regional Act	Won	
Lunas del Auditorio	2011	Juan Gabriel	Best Mexican/Regional Act	Nominated	
Lunas del Auditorio	2012	Juan Gabriel	Best Mexican/Regional Act	Nominated	
Lunas del Auditorio	2016	Juan Gabriel	Best Mexican/Regional Act	Won	
Miami Life Awards	2007	Juan Gabriel and Isabel Pantoja	Concert of the Year	Nominated	
National Auditorium (Mexico)	2012	Juan Gabriel	Dalia de Plata (Silver Dahlia)	Honoree	
Nipper de Oro	1976	Juan Gabriel	2 Million Sales in Mexico	Honoree	
Orgullosamente Latino Award	2004	Juan Gabriel	Latin Career Award	Honoree	
Premios Aplauso 98 (Note: A ceremony award organized by FM 98 and KLAX-FM members of Spanish Broadcasting System.)	1988	Juan Gabriel	Special award	Honoree	
Premios Aplauso 98	1990	Juan Gabriel	Singer-Songwriter of the Decade	Honoree	
Premios Bandamax
Premios Bandamax	2014	Juan Gabriel	Most Influential Singer on Social Media	Nominated	
Premios Bandamax	2015	Los Dúo	Album of the Year	Nominated	
Premios Bandamax	2015	"Querida" (with Juanes)	Collaboration of the Year	Nominated	
Premios Bandamax	2016	Juan Gabriel	Career Achievement Award	Honoree	
Premios Bandamax	2016	"La Frontera" (with Rocío Dúrcal)	Video of the Year	Won	
Premios Bravo	1988	Juan Gabriel	Producer of the Year	Nominated	
Premios Casandra	1995	Juan Gabriel	Soberano International	Honoree	
Premios Eres	1991	Juan Gabriel	Best Male Live Show	Won	
Premios Eres	1992	Juan Gabriel	Best Male Live Show	Won	
Premios Juventud	2004	Juan Gabriel	Best Moves	Nominated	
Premios Juventud	2004	Juan Gabriel	Voice of the Moment	Nominated	
Premios Juventud	2004	Juan Gabriel	He's Got Style	Nominated	
Premios Juventud	2004	"Amor eterno" (with Rocío Dúrcal)	Best Re-Mix	Nominated	
Premios Juventud	2004	"No Tengo Dinero" (with Kumbia Kings and El Gran Silencio)	Best Re-Mix	Nominated	
Premios Juventud	2004	Rocío Dúrcal & Juan Gabriel	Dynamic Duet	Nominated	
Premios Juventud	2004	"Siempre en mi mente"	Catchiest Tune	Nominated	
Premios Ondas	2001	Juan Gabriel	Achievement Award	Honoree	
Premios Oye!	2010	Juan Gabriel	Best Ranchero Solo or Duo/Group	Nominated	
Premios Radio y Televisión	2001	Juan Gabriel	Gold Award	Nominated	
Premios TVyNovelas	1987	Juan Gabriel	Best Singer	Nominated	
Premios TVyNovelas	2001	"Abrázame Muy Fuerte"	Best Musical Theme	Nominated	
Reforma	1999	Juan Gabriel	Male Songwriter of the Century	Nominated	
Reforma	1999	Juan Gabriel	Male Singer of the Century	Nominated	
Ritmo Latino Awards (Note: Also known as "Premio de la Gente" or Latin Music Fan Awards.)	1999	Juan Gabriel	Artist or Group Regional Mexican	Won	
Ritmo Latino Awards	1999	Juan Gabriel	La Opinión Tributo Nacional	Honoree	
Ritmo Latino Awards	2001	Juan Gabriel	Male Pop Artist or Group	Nominated	
Ritmo Latino Awards	2001	"Abrázame Muy Fuerte"	Song of the Year (Male or Female)	Won	
Ritmo Latino Awards	2001	Abrázame Muy Fuerte	Album of the Year	Nominated	
Sociedad de Autores y Compositores de México (SACM)	1995	Juan Gabriel	Composer of the Year	Won	
Spotify Awards	2020	Juan Gabriel	Most-Stremed Artist by users over 45 Years Old	Nominated	
The Latin Recording Academy	2009	Juan Gabriel	Person of the Year	Honoree	
Viña del Mar International Song Festival	1997	Juan Gabriel	Gaviota de Oro (Gold Gull)	Gold	
Viña del Mar International Song Festival	1999	Juan Gabriel	Gaviota de Oro	Gold	
Viña del Mar International Song Festival	2002	Juan Gabriel	Antorcha de Plata (Silver Torch)	Silver	
Viña del Mar International Song Festival	2004	Juan Gabriel	Antorcha de Plata	Silver	
Viña del Mar International Song Festival	2004	Juan Gabriel	Antorcha de Oro (Gold Torch)	Gold	
Viña del Mar International Song Festival	2004	Juan Gabriel	Gaviota de Plata	Silver	
Viña del Mar International Song Festival	2004	Juan Gabriel	Gaviota de Oro	Gold	

== Other honors ==
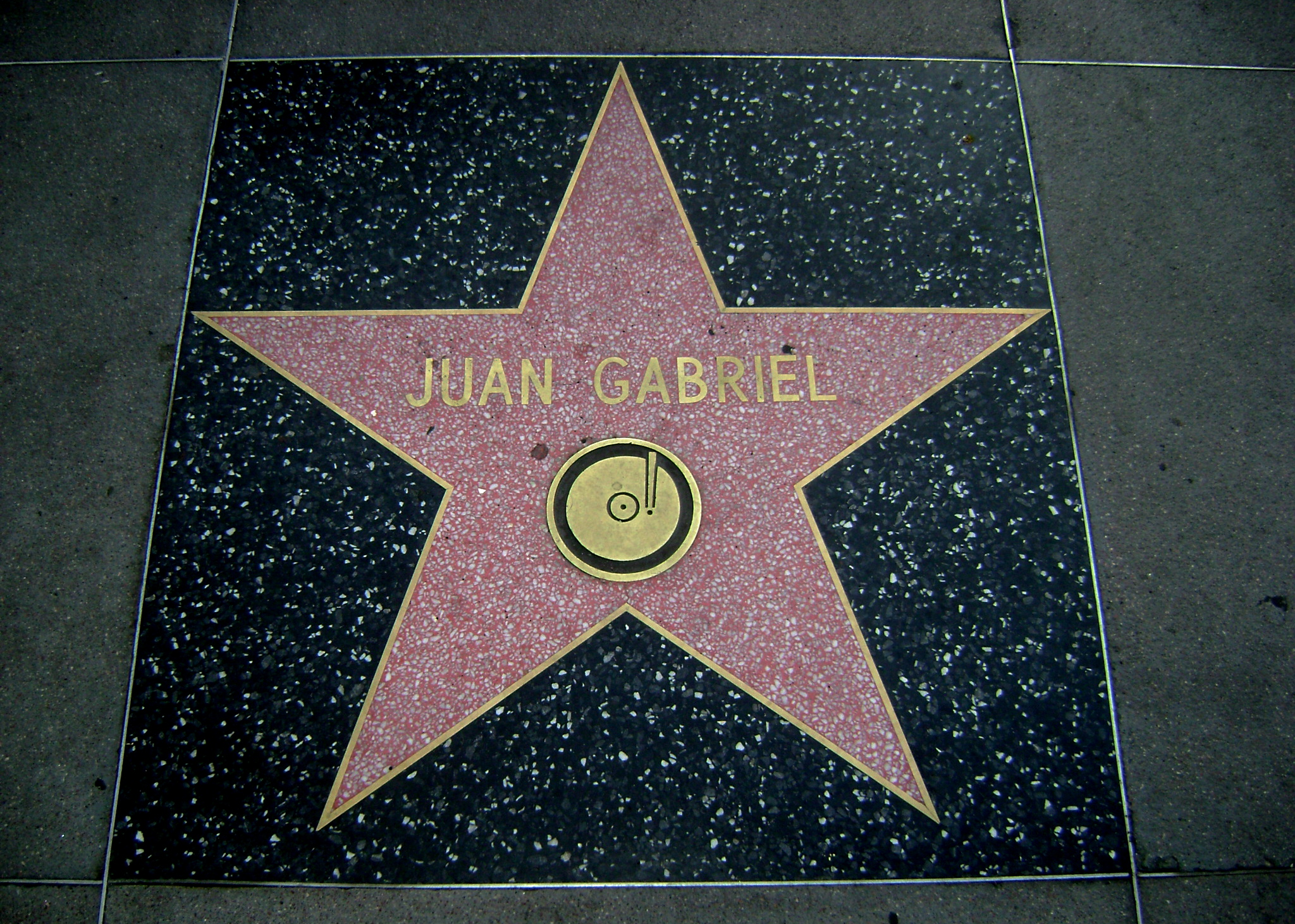
Gabriel's Walk Star on the Hollywood Walk of Fame

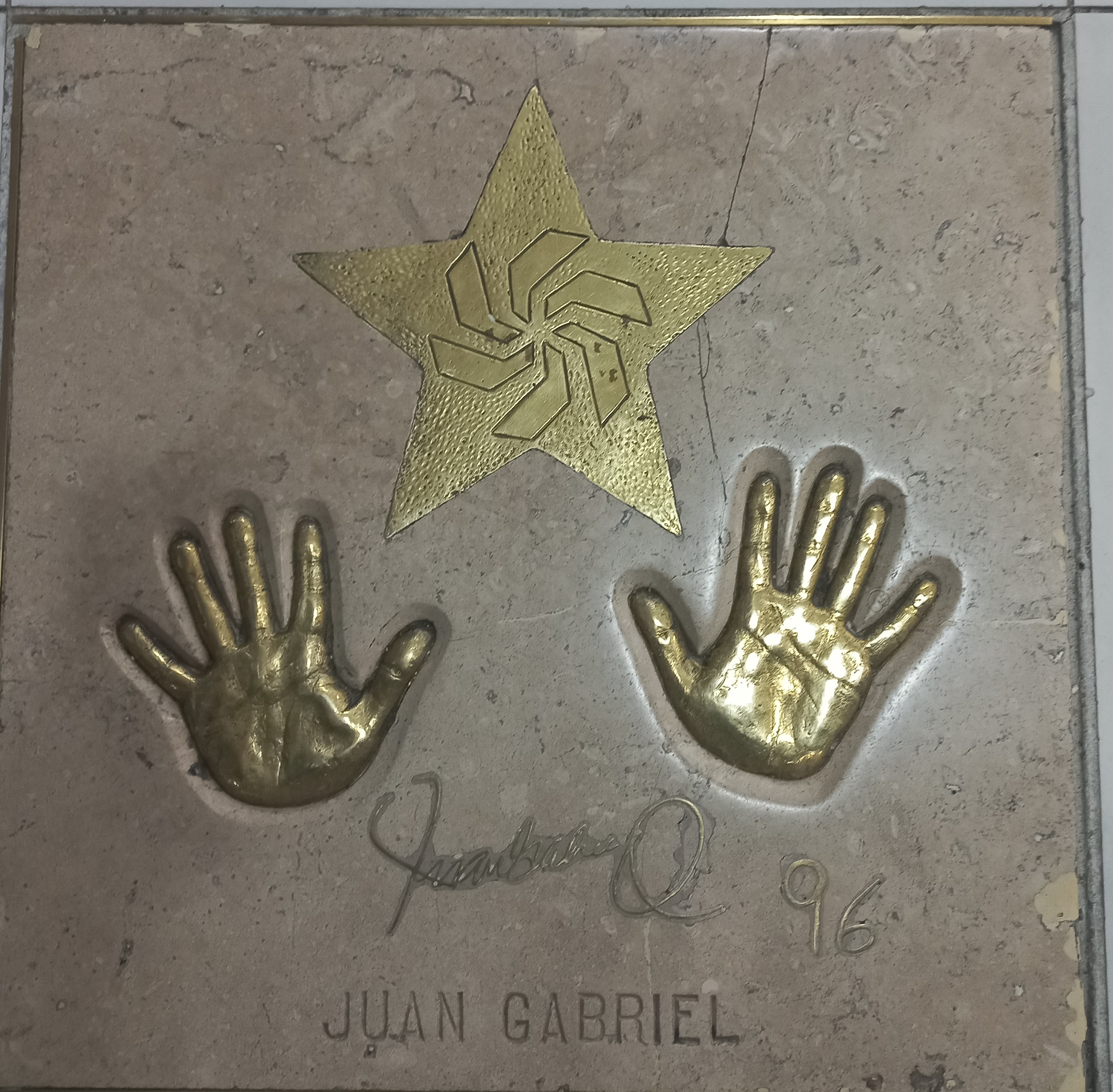
Gabriel's Handprints on the Plaza de las Estrellas in Mexico

List of state honors
Country	City/Gov./Entity	Year	Description	Status	Ref.
United States	Los Angeles/Mayor Tom Bradley	1986	Juan Gabriel's Day (October 5)	Honoree	
Vatican	Vatican City	1994	Keys to the City	Honoree	
Peru	Regional Government of La Libertad, City of Trujillo	2004	Great Officer of Order of Chan Chan	Honoree	
Mexico	Puerto Vallarta, Jalisco	2004	Keys to the City	Honoree	
Spain	King of Spain/King Juan Carlos I	2006	Universal Excellence Award	Honoree	
Spain	King of Spain/King Juan Carlos I	2006	Laurel de Oro (Golden Laurel)	Honoree	
Mexico	Tijuana City, Baja California	2015	Keys to the City	Honoree	
United States	Los Angeles City Council/Councillor Gil Cedillo	2016	Juan Gabriel's Day (October 27)	Honoree	
United States	Las Vegas City Hall	2016	Juan Gabriel's Day in Nevada (September 16)	Honoree	
Mexico	Juarez City	2016	Favorite Son (Hijo predilecto)	Honoree	
United States	United States Federal Congress	2016	Special Award for his cultural contributions to Las Vegas	Honoree	
Mexico	Tlacotalpan, Veracruz/Mayor Homero Gamboa Martínez	2016	Medal Agustín Lara	Honoree	
Mexico	Tlacotalpan, Veracruz/Mayor Homero Gamboa Martínez	2016	Keys to the City	Honoree	
United States	Commissioners Court of El Paso City/County Commissioner David Stout	2016	Juan Gabriel's Day (September 12)	Honoree	
Mexico	Senate of the Republic	2017	Belisario Domínguez Medal of Honor	Nominated	
Mexico	Parácuaro, Michoacán	2017	Juan Gabriel's Day (January 7)	Honoree	
United States	El Paso City Hall	2018	Juan Gabriel's Day (August 28)	Nominated	
Mexico	Municipal Government, Juarez	2022	Juan Gabriel's Day (August 28)	Honoree	

List of Walk of Fame/Hall of Fames for Juan Gabriel
Walk/Hall of Fame	Year	Description	Status	Ref.
Billboard Latin Music Hall of Fame	1996	Hall of Fame inductee	Inductee	
Plaza de las Estrellas	1996	Walk of Star	Won	
Little Havana's Calle 8 Walk of Fame	1999	Walk of Star	Won	
Hollywood Walk of Fame	2002	Walk of Star	Won	
Ritmo Latino Latin Music Greats	2003	Handprints	Won	
International Latin Music Hall of Fame	2003	Hall of Fame inductee	Inductee	
Las Vegas Walk of Stars	2009	Walk of Star	Won	
Tijuana Walk of Stars	2015	Walk of Star	Won	
Latin Songwriters Hall of Fame	2016	Hall of Fame inductee	Inductee	
Chihuahua Walk of Fame (Mexico)	2017	Walk of Star	Won	
Mexican National Auditorium's Paseo de las Lunas		Hall of Fame inductee	Inductee	
