= El Único: Sus Más Grandes Éxitos =

El Unico: Sus Más Grandes Exitos

Compilation album by Juan Gabriel
- Released: July 20, 2004
- Genre: Pop Latino, Mariachi, Ranchera, Regional
- Label: Sony Music Entertainment

Juan Gabriel chronology
Inocente de Ti (2003)	El Unico: Sus Más Grandes Exitos (2004)	15 Exitos de Juan Gabriel (2004)

El Unico: Sus Más Grandes Exitos (English: The Only One: His more Greatest Hits) is a compilation album by Mexican singer Juan Gabriel release on July 20, 2004.

== Track listing ==
No.	Title	Length
1.	"Siempre En Mi Mente"	3:26
2.	"Amor del Alma"	3:07
3.	"Se Me Olvidó Otra Vez"	2:56
4.	"No Vale La Pena"	2:31
5.	"Ya lo Sé Que Te Vas"	3:44
6.	"Debo Hacerlo"	9:39
7.	"No Me Vuelve a Enamorar"	3:20
8.	"Hasta Que Te Conocí"	7:14
9.	"La Más Querida"	2:35
10.	"Yo No Nací Para Amar"	4:27
11.	"Te le Pido por Favor"	3:39
12.	"De Mi Enamórate"	4:41
13.	"Querida"	5:27
14.	"Amor Eterno"	7:07
15.	"Más Que Amor"	4:26
