= Con Tu Amor =

Con Tu Amor (With Your Love) may refer to:

- Con Tu Amor (album), a 1981 album by Juan Gabriel
- "Con Tu Amor", 1994 song by Cristian Castro from the album El Camino del Alma
