= Del otro lado del puente =

Del otro lado del puente (English: On the other side of the bridge) may refer to:

- Del otro lado del puente (1953 film), an Argentine film
- Del otro lado del puente (1980 film), a Mexican musical drama film
- Me Gusta Bailar Contigo, a 1979 album by Juan Gabriel, re-released in 1996 as Del otro lado del puente
