= Los Dúo =

Studio album by Juan Gabriel
- Released: February 10, 2015
- Genre: Latin pop
- Length: 1:19:16
- Label: Fonovisa
- Producer: Gustavo Farias

Juan Gabriel chronology
| Boleros (2010) | Los Dúo (2015) | Los Dúo, Vol. 2 (2015) |

Los Dúo is the twenty-eighth studio album by Mexican musician Juan Gabriel, released on February 10, 2015. It features artists performing duets with Juan Gabriel. A bonus DVD was included. The album won the award for Album of the Year at the Latin American Music Awards of 2015.

== Track listing ==
All tracks are written by Juan Gabriel.

| No. | Title | from the album | Length |
|---|---|---|---|
| 1. | "Querida" (featuring Juanes) | Recuerdos, Vol. II (1984) | 4:55 |
| 2. | "Se Me Olvidó Otra Vez" (featuring Marco Antonio Solís) | Juan Gabriel con el Mariachi Vargas de Tecalitlán (1979) | 3:16 |
| 3. | "Hasta Que Te Conocí" (featuring Joy) | Pensamientos (1986) | 8:48 |
| 4. | "La Diferencia" (featuring Vicente Fernández) | Juan Gabriel con Mariachi (1980) | 3:31 |
| 5. | "Si Quieres" (featuring Natalia Jiménez) | Cosas de Enamorados (1982) | 5:41 |
| 6. | "Así Fue" (featuring Isabel Pantoja) | Celebrando 25 Años de Juan Gabriel: En Concierto en el Palacio de Bellas Artes (1998) | 6:32 |
| 7. | "Yo Te Bendigo Mi Amor" (featuring David Bisbal) | Mis Ojos Tristes | 4:19 |
| 8. | "Caray" (featuring Alejandra Guzmán) | Todo (1983) | 4:05 |
| 9. | "Siempre en Mi Mente" (featuring Espinoza Paz) | Siempre en Mi Mente (1978) | 3:57 |
| 10. | "Abrázame Muy Fuerte" (featuring Laura Pausini) | Abrázame Muy Fuerte (2000) | 6:01 |
| 11. | "Te Lo Pido Por Favor" (featuring Luis Fonsi) | | 4:03 |
| 12. | "Verás" (featuring José María Napoleón) | Pensamientos (1986) | 4:25 |
| 13. | "Amor Es Amor" (featuring Antonio Orozco) | Pensamientos (1986) | 4:10 |
| 14. | "Pero Qué Necesidad" (featuring Emmanuel) | Gracias por Esperar (1994) | 5:42 |
| 15. | "Ya No Vivo Por Vivir" (featuring Natalia Lafourcade originally titled "Lentamente") | Gracias por Esperar (1994) | 6:14 |
| 16. | "Vienes o Voy" (featuring Fifth Harmony) | Gracias por Esperar (1994) | 3:37 |

== DVD ==
| No. | Title | Length |
|---|---|---|
| 1. | "Juan Gabriel Comentarios" |
| 2. | "Querida" |
| 3. | "Yo Te Bendigo Mi Amor" |
| 4. | "Siempre en Mi Mente" |
| 5. | "Te Lo Pido Por Favor" |
| 6. | "Verás" |
| 7. | "Ya No Vivo Por Vivir" |

== Promotion ==
Juan Gabriel embarked on the Bienvenidos al Noa Noa Gira 2015 to promote the Los Dúo album. The tour ended March 5, 2016.

== Charts ==
=== Weekly charts ===
| Chart (2015) | Peak position |
|---|---|
| Mexican Albums (AMPROFON) | 1 |
| Spanish Albums (PROMUSICAE) | 75 |
| US Billboard 200 | 25 |
| US Top Latin Albums (Billboard) | 1 |
| US Latin Pop Albums (Billboard) | 1 |

=== Year-end charts ===
| Chart (2015) | Position |
|---|---|
| Mexican Albums (AMPROFON) | 1 |
| US Top Latin Albums (Billboard) | 1 |
| Chart (2016) | Position |
| Mexican Albums (AMPROFON) | 5 |
| US Top Latin Albums (Billboard) | 3 |
| Chart (2017) | Position |
| Mexican Albums (AMPROFON) | 35 |
| US Top Latin Albums (Billboard) | 46 |

== Certifications ==
| Region | Certification | Certified units/sales |
|---|---|---|
| Mexico (AMPROFON) | 2× Diamond+2× Platinum | 720,000^{‡} |
| United States (RIAA) | Platinum (Latin) | 131,000 |
^{‡} Sales+streaming figures based on certification alone.

== See also ==
- List of number-one albums of 2015 (Mexico)
- List of number-one Billboard Latin Albums from the 2010s
