= Todo Está Bien =

Studio album by Juan Gabriel
- Released: October 26, 1999
- Recorded: 1999
- Genre: Latin pop
- Label: RCA Records

Juan Gabriel chronology
Romanticos! (1999)	Todo Está Bien (1999)	Abrázame Muy Fuerte (2000)

Todo Está Bien (English: All is Good) is a studio album by Mexican singer Juan Gabriel, released on October 26, 1999.

== Track listing ==
No.	Title	Length
1.	"Intro: Todo Está Bien"	0:32
2.	"Enamorado y Feliz"	3:41
3.	"No Apaguen la Luz"	3:26
4.	"La Princesa y la Reina"	3:48
5.	"947 Fiske St."	2:44
6.	"Zacatecana Linda"	3:46
7.	"Errado"	3:36
8.	"La Mujer Que Yo Amo"	2:45
9.	"Influenciado Por la Luna"	4:15
10.	"Dame Tu Mano"	3:55
11.	"Todo Está Bien"	3:47

== Charts ==
Chart (1999)	Peak position
US Top Latin Albums (Billboard)	31
US Latin Pop Albums (Billboard)	14

== Sales and certifications ==
Region	Certification	Certified units/sales
Mexico (AMPROFON)	Platinum	150,000^{^}
United States (RIAA)	Platinum (Latin)	100,000^{^}
^{^} Shipments figures based on certification alone.
