= Ella (Juan Gabriel album) =

Studio album by Juan Gabriel
- Released: October 27, 1980
- Recorded: 1972–1978
- Genre: Latin pop, mariachi
- Label: RCA Records

Juan Gabriel chronology
Juan Gabriel Con Mariachi (1980)	Ella (1980)	Con Tu Amor (1981)

Ella (Her) is the fifteenth studio album by Juan Gabriel, released in 1980. Available only for a very short time and distributed by RCA (Juan Gabriel's original record label) with some songs not used previously at any record for example; the first version of "Te Sigo Amando" and some B sides.

== Track listing ==
No.	Title	Length
1.	"Ella"	2:50
2.	"Te Sigo Amando"	2:45
3.	"Que Se Parezca a Tí"	2:58
4.	"Sólo Tú y Yo"	3:31
5.	"Esta Noche (duo with Estela Nuñez)"	3:03
6.	"Hoy Por Fin"	2:47
7.	"Ya No Puede Ser Posible"	2:17
8.	"Juro Que Nunca Volveré"	2:19
9.	"Mañana, Mañana (duo with Estela Nuñez)"	2:49
10.	"Tristeza y Soledad"	4:34
