= Frente a Frente, Vol. 1 =

Frente a Frente Vol. I

Compilation album by Juan Gabriel
- Released: 1984
- Recorded: 1980–82
- Label: RCA Records

Frente a Frente Vol. I is a compilation album released by Juan Gabriel in 1984. The album features some Rocío Dúrcal tracks with others Juan Gabriel songs all from the 1982 album: Cosas de Enamorados.

== Track listing ==
All tracks are written by Juan Gabriel.

No.	Title	Length
1.	"Frente a Frente"	4:48
2.	"Es Mejor - From: Cosas de Enamorados (1982)"	2:53
3.	"Cuando Te Vayas"	2:47
4.	"Una Vez Mas - From: Cosas de Enamorados (1982)"	3:10
5.	"Tu Que Te Fuiste (featuring Rocío Dúrcal)"	3:37
6.	"Si Quieres - From: Cosas de Enamorados (1982)"	4:10
7.	"No Me Vuelvo Enamorar - From: Cosas de Enamorados (1982)"	3:19
8.	"Por Que Fue Que Te Ame (featuring Rocío Dúrcal)"	4:30
9.	"Ya lo Se, Que Te Vas - From: Cosas de Enamorados (1982)"	3:44
10.	"El Mas Querido (featuring Rocío Dúrcal)"	3:26
11.	"Cosas de Enamorados - From: Cosas de Enamorados (1982)"	3:27
12.	"Tenias Que Ser Tan Cruel (featuring Rocío Dúrcal)"	3:20

== Charts ==
Chart (1986)	Peak position
US Latin Pop Albums (Billboard)	25
