= Recuerdos =

Studio album by Juan Gabriel
- Released: March 11, 1980
- Recorded: 1979–1980
- Genre: Latin pop
- Label: RCA Records

Juan Gabriel chronology
| Me Gusta Bailar Contigo (1979) | Recuerdos (1980) | Juan Gabriel Con Mariachi (1980) |

Recuerdos (English: Memories) is the thirteenth studio album by the Mexican singer-songwriter Juan Gabriel, released in 1980. Songs from this album were used in the film El Noa Noa.

== Track listing ==
| No. | Title | Length |
|---|---|---|
| 1. | "La Frontera" | 4:10 |
| 2. | "Dulces Momentos de Ayer" | 3:08 |
| 3. | "El Noa Noa" | 4:17 |
| 4. | "Nunca Lo Sabré, Nunca Lo Sabrás" | 2:48 |
| 5. | "Quiero Saber ¿Por Qué?" | 2:43 |
| 6. | "Lástima Es Mi Mujer" | 2:54 |
| 7. | "He Venido a Pedirte Perdón" | 4:58 |
| 8. | "Yo No Nací Para Amar" | 4:26 |
| 9. | "Busca Un Amor" | 3:43 |
| 10. | "Yo Quiero Ser Igual Que Tú" | 3:19 |
| 11. | "¿Por Qué Estas Enojada?" | 3:16 |
| 12. | "Siempre Reza Por Mi" | 3:20 |
