= Boleros (Juan Gabriel album) =

Studio album by Juan Gabriel
- Released: December 7, 2010
- Recorded: 2010
- Genre: Bolero
- Label: Fonovisa
- Producer: Juan Gabriel

Juan Gabriel chronology
Juan Gabriel (2010)	Boleros (2010)	Los Dúo (2015)

Boleros is a studio album released by Juan Gabriel on December 7, 2010.

== Track listing ==
All tracks are written by Juan Gabriel.

No.	Title	Length
1.	"Bendito Domingo"	3:23
2.	"Esto No Se le Hace a Nadie"	3:44
3.	"Con Sabor a Olvido"	3:38
4.	"Asi Sucedio"	2:42
5.	"Disculpame Por"	3:14
6.	"Pase lo Que Pase"	2:43
7.	"Me Perdonas"	3:37
8.	"Aunque Nunca Vuelvas"	2:55
9.	"¿Que le Dijiste a Dios?"	3:12
10.	"Conquistame Otra Vez"	2:24
11.	"Disculpame Por (Instrumental Version)"	3:14
12.	"Cada Uno a Su Casa"	2:50
13.	"Divino Cancún"	3:33

== Charts ==
Chart (2010)	Peak position
US Top Latin Albums (Billboard)	17
US Latin Pop Albums (Billboard)	8
