= Juntos Otra Vez (Juan Gabriel and Rocío Dúrcal album) =

Studio album by Juan Gabriel and Rocío Dúrcal
- Released: April 29, 1997
- Recorded: 1996–1997
- Genre: Latin pop, mariachi
- Label: RCA
- Producer: Juan Gabriel, Enrique Okamura

Juan Gabriel chronology
Del Otro Lado del Puente (1996)	Juntos Otra Vez (1997)	Por Mi Orgullo (1998)

Rocío Dúrcal chronology
Hay Amores y Amores (1995)	Juntos Otra Vez (1997)	Para Toda la Vida (1999)

Singles from Juntos Otra Vez
- 1. "El Destino" Released: 31 March 1997

Professional ratings
Review scores
Source	Rating
AllMusic	4.5/5 stars

Juntos Otra Vez (English: Together Again) is the twenty-third studio album by Mexican singer-songwriter Juan Gabriel, released on 29 April 1997. It featured Spanish singer Rocío Dúrcal, with whom Gabriel had previously collaborated, and is also her seventeenth studio album. This album became their first number-one set on the Billboard Top Latin Albums. The album was awarded "Regional Mexican Album of the Year" at the 1998 Premio Lo Nuestro Award.

On 24 June 1997, Gabriel and Dúrcal performed the album as a dance spectacle show in full Mexican costume at the Theater Degollado in Guadalajara, Mexico, which was recorded for DVD by BMG and also featured a performance contribution from Miguel Aceves Mejía and Amalia Mendoza. The concert was accompanied by full orchestra and a mariachi ensemble on stage.

== Track listing ==
All tracks are written by Juan Gabriel.

Disc one
No.	Title	Performer	Length
1.	"El Principio"	Juan Gabriel	6:04
2.	"Juntos"	Juan Gabriel and Rocío Dúrcal (Duet)	4:58
3.	"El Verdadero Amor"	Juan Gabriel	2:56
4.	"Te He Escrito Otra Canción"	Duet	3:30
5.	"Nena Que Pena"	Juan Gabriel	3:51
6.	"La Incertidumbre"	Duet	3:19
7.	"Que Rechula Es Katy"	Juan Gabriel	3:53
8.	"Dos Favores"	Duet	2:55
9.	"Donde Hay Celos"	Juan Gabriel	2:07
10.	"Que Bonito es Santa Fe"	Duet	5:16
Total length:			38:49

Disc two
No.	Title	Performer	Length
1.	"El México de Rocío"	Rocío Dúrcal	4:32
2.	"El Destino"	Duet	4:43
3.	"Me Refugié en Tu Juventud"	Rocío Dúrcal	5:50
4.	"¿Sabes Por Qué?"	Duet	3:45
5.	"Así Son los Hombres"	Rocío Dúrcal	3:11
6.	"Santo Niñito"	Duet	4:14
7.	"No Me Digas"	Rocío Dúrcal	3:34
8.	"La Gitana"	Duet	3:36
9.	"Te Sigo Amando"	Rocío Dúrcal	2:44
10.	"El Final (Amor Eterno)"	Instrumental	3:32
Total length:			39:41

== Chart performance ==
Chart (1996)	Peak position
US Billboard Top Latin Albums	1
US Billboard Latin Pop Albums	1
US Billboard Regional Mexican Albums	1
US Billboard Heatseekers Albums	3
US Billboard 200	152

== Certifications and sales ==
Region	Certification	Certified units/sales
Mexico	—	757,000
Mexico (AMPROFON) Video	Gold	10,000^{^}
United States (RIAA)	2× Platinum (Latin)	200,000^{^}
^{^} Shipments figures based on certification alone.
