= ¡Románticos! =

Compilation album by Juan Gabriel and Rocío Dúrcal
- Released: 12 January 1999
- Genres: Pop Latino, Romantics
- Length: 34:51
- Label: RCA Records

Rocío Dúrcal chronology
¡Románticos! (1999)

¡Románticos! (English: Romantic Songs!) is a compilation album released by Juan Gabriel with Spanish singer Rocío Dúrcal on 12 January 1999. The track listing alternates between songs from Gabriel's 1982 album Cosas de Enamorados and songs sung by Dúrcal.

== Track listing ==
All tracks are written by Juan Gabriel.

No.	Title	Length
1.	"Insensible"	2:47
2.	"Tu Que Te Fuiste"	3:37
3.	"Ya lo Se Que Te Vas"	3:34
4.	"Olvidémonos"	3:32
5.	"Si Quieres"	4:10
6.	"Tenías Que Ser Tan Cruel"	3:20
7.	"No Me Vuelvo a Enamorar"	3:19
8.	"Cuando Te Vayas"	2:47
9.	"Tú Me Dijiste Adiós"	3:19
10.	"¿Por Qué Fue Que Te Amé?"	4:30
