= Los 15 Grandes Éxitos de Juan Gabriel =

Los 15 Grandes Exitos de Juan Gabriel

Compilation album by Juan Gabriel
- Released: 1982, re-released July 27, 2004
- Genre: Latin
- Label: Sony Int'l (International) BMG International (USA)
- Producer: Juan Gabriel

Los 15 Grandes Exitos de Juan Gabriel is a compilation album released by Juan Gabriel in 1982 and re-released on July 27, 2004.

== Track listing ==
All tracks are written by Juan Gabriel

No.	Title	Length
1.	"El Noa Noa"	4:23
2.	"Aunque Te Enamores"	3:40
3.	"Cuando Quieras, Dejame"	3:02
4.	"Yo No Naci Para Amar"	4:30
5.	"Ya Para Que"	3:02
6.	"Me Gusta Bailar Contigo"	5:15
7.	"Inocente Pobre Amigo"	4:07
8.	"He Venido a Pedirte Perdón"	5:03
9.	"La Diferencia"	3:22
10.	"La Frontera"	4:14
11.	"Mis Ojos Tristes"	3:54
12.	"Buenos Dias Señor Sol"	2:43
13.	"Mi Fracaso"	2:45
14.	"Adios Amor, Te Vas"	4:19
15.	"Con Tu Amor"	4:06
