= Recuerdos, Vol. II =

1984 studio album by Juan Gabriel

Studio album by Juan Gabriel
- Released: July 11, 1984
- Genre: Canción melódica
- Label: Ariola Mexico

Juan Gabriel chronology
Todo (1983)	Recuerdos, Vol. II (1984)	Pensamientos (1986)

Recuerdos, Vol. II is the nineteenth studio album by Mexican singer-songwriter Juan Gabriel, released in 1984. It is reportedly the best-selling album of all time in Mexico, with over seven million units sold. It received a nomination for a Grammy Award for Best Mexican-American performance in 1985. The album yielded the hit "Querida", which is one of Gabriel's most popular well-known songs.

== Track listing ==
All tracks are written by Juan Gabriel.

No.	Title	Length
1.	"Juarez es el #1"	3:27
2.	"Meche"	3:57
3.	"El Noa Noa II"	5:09
4.	"Eternamente Agradecido"	3:39
5.	"Que No Diera Yo"	4:42
6.	"Recuerdos"	4:02
7.	"Querida"	5:27
8.	"Bailando"	4:05
9.	"Besame"	4:10
10.	"Tus Ojos Mexicanos Lindos"	4:57

== Charts ==
Chart (1985)	Peak position
US Latin Pop Albums (Billboard)	7

== See also ==
- Juan Gabriel discography
