= 15 Éxitos de Juan Gabriel =

Compilation album by Juan Gabriel
- Released: 1981
- Genre: Latin
- Label: RCA Records (Vinyl) SME (CD)
- Producer: Juan Gabriel

15 Éxitos de Juan Gabriel is a compilation album released by Juan Gabriel in 1981. Re-released on August 3, 2004.

== Track listing ==
All tracks are written by Juan Gabriel.

No.	Title	Length
1.	"Siempre en Mi Mente"	3:29
2.	"Me He Quedado Solo"	3:25
3.	"Tu Abandono"	1:52
4.	"Que Divino Amor"	2:14
5.	"Juro Que Nunca Volveré"	2:24
6.	"Nada Ni Nadie"	2:35
7.	"Te Llegara Mi Olvido"	2:19
8.	"Mi Guitarra"	2:58
9.	"No Tengo Dinero"	3:09
10.	"Siempre Estoy Pensando en Ti"	3:31
11.	"En Esta Primavera"	3:21
12.	"Se Me Olvido Otra Vez"	2:57
13.	"Sera Mañana"	2:59
14.	"Te Voy a Olvidar"	3:25
15.	"No Se Ha Dado Cuenta"	2:25
