= Por Mi Orgullo =

Compilation album by Juan Gabriel
- Released: September 28, 1998
- Genre: Romantic music, regional Mexican
- Label: RCA

Por Mi Orgullo (For My Pride) is a compilation album released by the Mexican recording artist Juan Gabriel on September 28, 1998. All tracks previously available

== Track listing ==
No.	Title	Length
1.	"Por Mi Orgullo (with Mariachi America de Jesus Rodriguez de Hijar) - from: Juan Gabriel Con Mariachi (1980)"	2:18
2.	"Solo Se Que Fue En Marzo (2nd version with Mariachi Arriba Juarez) - from: Pensamientos (1986)"	3:57
3.	"Lo Que Quiero (with Mariachi America de Jesus Rodriguez de Hijar) - from: Juan Gabriel Con Mariachi (1980)"	2:50
4.	"Nada Mas Decidete - from: Todo (1983)"	2:04
5.	"Cuando Quieras...Dejame - from: Mis Ojos Tristes (1979)"	2:57
6.	"Yo Me Voy - from: Todo (1983)"	3:03
7.	"Veinte Años (with Mariachi America de Jesus Rodriguez de Hijar) - from: Juan Gabriel Con Mariachi (1980)"	2:37
8.	"Con Un Poco De Amor (with Mariachi America de Jesus Rodriguez de Hijar) - from: Te Llegará Mi Olvido (1977)"	2:46
9.	"Todo - from: Todo (1983)"	2:25
10.	"Otra Vez Me Enamore (with Mariachi Mexico 70 de Pepe Lopez) - from: Con Mariachi Vol. II (1977)"	2:49
11.	"Te lo Pido Por Favor (with Mariachi Arriba Juarez) - from: Pensamientos (1986)"	3:30
12.	"Estoy Enamorado de Ti (with El Mariachi Vargas De Tecalitlan) - from: Con El Mariachi Vargas de Tecalitlán (1974)"	3:14
13.	"Donde Andara? (with El Mariachi Vargas De Tecalitlan) - from: Con El Mariachi Vargas de Tecalitlán (1974)"	1:44
14.	"Yo No Se Que Me Paso (with Mariachi Arriba Juarez) - from: Pensamientos (1986)"	5:12
15.	"Dios Te Bendiga Mi Amor - from: Mis Ojos Tristes (1979)"	3:40
