= A Mi Guitarra =

1975 studio album by Juan Gabriel

Studio album by Juan Gabriel
- Released: June 9, 1975
- Recorded: 1975
- Genre: Latin pop
- Language: Spanish
- Label: RCA

Juan Gabriel chronology
10 Éxitos de Juan Gabriel (1975)	A Mi Guitarra (1975)	Juan Gabriel con Mariachi Vol. II (1976)

A Mi Guitarra (in English: To My Guitar) is the sixth studio album by Mexican singer-songwriter Juan Gabriel, released in 1975.

== Track listing ==
No.	Title	Length
1.	"Te Propongo Matrimonio"	2:52
2.	"Cuando Seas Mi Mujer"	3:55
3.	"Nuestro Amor Es El Mas Bello Del Mundo"	3:09
4.	"Vives En Mi"	3:38
5.	"Eres Dificil De Olvidar"	3:42
6.	"A Mi Guitarra"	3:56
7.	"Un Adios Y Lagrimas"	2:45
8.	"Llegue Y Me Voy"	4:24
9.	"De Sol a Sol (A Mis Padres)"	4:08
10.	"Jesucristo ¿Donde Estas?"	4:57
