= Los Dúo, Vol. 3 =

Studio album by Juan Gabriel
- Released: November 11, 2022
- Recorded: 2016, 2022
- Genres: Latin pop, Regional mexican
- Length: 50:36
- Label: Virgin
- Producer: Gustavo Farias

Juan Gabriel chronology
Vestido de Etiqueta por Eduardo Magallanes (2016)	Los Dúo, Vol. 3 (2022)	México con Escalas en Mi Corazón (Ciudades) (2023)

Singles from Los Dúo, Vol. 3
- 1. "Déjame Vivir" Released: October 28, 2022

Los Dúo, Vol. 3 is the thirty-first studio album by Mexican musician Juan Gabriel, released on November 11, 2022. It features artists performing duets with Juan Gabriel, including Anahí, Gloria Trevi, Danna, Mon Laferte, Pepe Aguilar and others.

== Track listing ==
All songs written and composed by Juan Gabriel except for "Have You Ever Seen the Rain?" by John Fogerty.

Los Dúo, Vol. 3 track listing
No.	Title	Length
1.	"Déjame Vivir" (featuring Anahí)	3:56
2.	"Que Me Haces Llorar" (featuring Gloria Trevi)	3:17
3.	"Cada Vez y Cada Vez" (featuring Pepe Aguilar)	3:17
4.	"De Mí Enamórate" (featuring Danna)	4:59
5.	"He Venido A Pedirte Perdón" (featuring Mon Laferte)	3:56
6.	"Have You Ever Seen the Rain?" (featuring John Fogerty)	2:47
7.	"Nada Más Decídete" (featuring Ángela Aguilar)	3:06
8.	"Luna Tras Luna" (featuring George Benson)	4:24
9.	"Yo No Nací Para Amar" (featuring Lasso)	4:24
10.	"Venecia Sin Ti" (featuring Charles Aznavour)	3:18
11.	"Te Doy 8 Días" (featuring La Adictiva)	2:54
12.	"Déjame" (featuring Luciano Pereyra)	4:24
13.	"Mía Un Año" (featuring Eslabon Armado)	2:54
14.	"Ya" (featuring Banda El Recodo de Cruz Lizárraga, La India)	2:53
Total length:		50:36
