= Juan Gabriel (album) =

Studio album by Juan Gabriel
- Released: May 4, 2010
- Recorded: 2009–2010, Mexico City, Monterrey and Cancún, Mexico
- Genre: Mariachi, Bolero
- Length: 36:55
- Label: Universal Music
- Producer: Juan Gabriel

Juan Gabriel chronology
Inocente de Ti (2003)	Juan Gabriel (2010)	Boleros (2010)

Juan Gabriel is the self-titled and twenty-seventh studio album by Mexican singer-songwriter Juan Gabriel. It was released on May 4, 2010, his first studio album in seven years. On this album, there are 11 tracks, 5 of which had never been previously recorded, and the remaining 6 tracks are songs that Gabriel had written, but were recorded by other artists, and Gabriel himself having recorded them himself for the first time.

== Track listing ==
All tracks are written by Juan Gabriel.

No.	Title	Length
1.	"Te Vas A Quedar Con Las Ganas"	3:29
2.	"Gracias Al Amor"	3:25
3.	"Las Tardes Aquellas"	3:35
4.	"Mi Mas Bello Error"	3:27
5.	"El Consentido"	2:45
6.	"¿Por Qué Me Haces Llorar?"	3:00
7.	"De La Cabeza A Los Pies"	3:08
8.	"Amor Aventurero"	3:44
9.	"Mariachi"	4:10
10.	"Nunca, Nunca Vuelvas"	3:06
11.	"Agradecimiento"	3:01

== Charts ==
Chart (2010)	Peak position
US Billboard 200	133
US Billboard Top Latin Albums	2
US Billboard Regional Mexican Albums	1

== Sales and certifications ==
Region	Certification	Certified units/sales
Mexico (AMPROFON)	Platinum	60,000^{^}
^{^} Shipments figures based on certification alone.
