= Inocente de Ti (album) =

Studio album by Juan Gabriel
- Released: October 21, 2003
- Recorded: 2002–2003
- Genre: Latin pop
- Label: BMG U.S. Latin
- Producer: Gustavo Farias

Juan Gabriel chronology
Abrázame Muy Fuerte (2000)	Inocente de Ti (2003)	Juan Gabriel (2010)

Inocente de Ti (English: Innocent of You) is the 26th studio album recorded by Mexican singer-songwriter Juan Gabriel. It was released by BMG U.S. Latin Latin on October 21, 2003 (see 2003 in music) . It was also the theme song for a Mexican telenovela Inocente de Tí (2004-2005), produced by Nathalie Lartilleux, Camila Sodi and Valentino Lanús, starred as protagonists, while Helena Rojo and Carolina Tejera starred as antagonists. Lupita Ferrer and Ricardo Blume starred as stellar performances. The song Yo Te Recuerdo was used as the theme song of the telenovela Mariana de la Noche (2003-2004), produced by Salvador Mejía, with a different musical arrangement. Alejandra Barros and Jorge Salinas starred as protagonists, while César Évora and Angélica Rivera, starred as antagonists. The album received a nomination Latin Grammy Award for Best Singer-Songwriter Album in 5th Annual Latin Grammy Awards, losing yo Soraya by Soraya.

== Track listing ==
All tracks are written by Juan Gabriel.

No.	Title	Length
1.	"Inocente de Ti"	4:05
2.	"Yo Te Recuerdo"	2:55
3.	"Loco Enamorado"	3:43
4.	"Como Te Quiero Mi Amor"	2:25
5.	"Gracias por Todo"	2:32
6.	"Amor Profundo"	4:06
7.	"Idilio"	4:46
8.	"Luna Llena"	4:36
9.	"Fin"	4:43
10.	"Amándote"	4:04

== Chart performance ==
Chart (2003)	Peak position
US Billboard Latin Pop Albums	9
US Billboard Latin Albums	21

== Sales and certifications ==
Region	Certification	Certified units/sales
Mexico (AMPROFON)	Platinum	100,000^{^}
United States (RIAA)	Platinum (Latin)	60,000^{‡}
^{^} Shipments figures based on certification alone.^{‡} Sales+streaming figures based on certification alone.
