= Con Tu Amor (album) =

Studio album by Juan Gabriel
- Released: April 28, 1981
- Recorded: 1980–1981
- Genre: Latin pop
- Label: Ariola
- Producer: Eduardo Magallanes

Juan Gabriel chronology
Ella (1980)	Con Tu Amor (1981)	Cosas de Enamorados (1982)

Con Tu Amor (With your love) is the sixteenth studio album by Juan Gabriel, released in 1981.

== Track listing ==
All tracks are written by Juan Gabriel.

No.	Title	Length
1.	"Con Tu Amor"	4:06
2.	"Maria de la Paz"	3:47
3.	"En el Nombre del Amor"	4:14
4.	"No Me Trates Mal"	2:29
5.	"Karina"	4:16
6.	"Besame Otra Vez (Eso Fue Ayer)"	3:21
7.	"Paracuaro"	3:24
8.	"Perla"	3:51
9.	"Canta Canta"	3:12
10.	"With Your Love"	4:06

== Sources ==
- "Juan Gabriel Con Tu Amor". Amazon.
- "Juan Gabriel Con Tu Amor". allmusic.com.
