= El Alma Joven... =

Studio album by Juan Gabriel
- Released: 1971
- Recorded: 1971
- Genre: Latin pop
- Language: Spanish
- Label: RCA Records

Juan Gabriel chronology
El Alma Joven... (1971)	El Alma Joven Vol.II (1972)

Singles from El Alma Joven...
- 1. "El Alma Joven..."; 2. "No Tengo Dinero"

El Alma Joven... (in English: The Young Soul...) is the debut studio album by Mexican singer-songwriter Juan Gabriel, released in 1971. The album's title track was released as Gabriel's debut single and spawned Gabriel's first hit song "No Tengo Dinero", which remains one of Gabriel's most popular songs and launched his career.

== Track listing ==
All tracks are written by Juan Gabriel.

No.	Title	Length
1.	"No Tengo Dinero"	3:06
2.	"Tres Claveles y Un Rosal"	2:25
3.	"Me He Quedado Solo"	3:24
4.	"La Más Querida"	2:34
5.	"Lily"	3:23
6.	"En el Mundo Ya No Hay Paz"	4:02
7.	"El Pueblo de la Tristeza"	1:57
8.	"Por las Mañanas"	2:19
9.	"Como Amigos"	3:29
10.	"Voy a Comprobarte"	3:05
