= Juan Gabriel en el Palacio de Bellas Artes =

Live album by Juan Gabriel
- Released: 20 December 1990
- Recorded: 9-12 May 1990
- Venues: Palacio de Bellas Artes (Mexico City, Mexico)
- Genre: Canción melódica
- Label: RCA
- Producer: Juan Gabriel

Juan Gabriel en el Palacio de Bellas Artes is the first live album released by Mexican singer-songwriterJuan Gabriel. It was recorded over four nights in May 1990 at the Palacio de Bellas Artes in Mexico Cityand subsequently released on December 20, 1990. It was nominated for Pop Album of the Year at the Lo Nuestro Awards of 1992.

The performance, accompanied by the Mexican National Symphony Orchestra, marked Juan Gabriel as the first non-classical music artist to perform at the Palacio de Bellas Artes. Although the event initially received mixed reactions, particularly regarding the inclusion of a popular music performer at the prestigious classical venue, its reception gradually improved over the years. The album is now widely regarded as one of Juan Gabriel's finest works and is frequently cited among the greatest live albums of all time.

== Track listing ==
All tracks are written by Juan Gabriel.

Disc one
| No. | Title | Length |
|---|---|---|
| 1. | "Obertura: No Discutamos/Mi Fracaso/Adiós Amor, Te Vas" | 4:26 |
| 2. | "Yo Te Perdono" | 4:10 |
| 3. | "Yo No Nací Para Amar" | 6:10 |
| 4. | "Amor del Alma" | 3:05 |
| 5. | "Ya lo Sé Que Tú Te Vas" | 8:03 |
| 6. | "Se Me Olvidó Otra Vez" | 3:40 |
| 7. | "Me Nace del Corazón" | 2:44 |
| 8. | "No Vale la Pena" | 2:24 |
| 9. | "Inocente Pobre Amigo" | 5:47 |
| 10. | "Te lo Pido Por Favor" | 3:04 |
| 11. | "Amor Eterno" | 7:08 |

Disc two
| No. | Title | Length |
|---|---|---|
| 1. | "Hasta Que Te Conocí (Popurrí)" | 25:55 |
| 2. | "De Mí Enamórate" | 4:35 |
| 3. | "Mi Más Bello Error" | 3:59 |
| 4. | "Querida" | 5:33 |
| 5. | "La Más Querida" | 5:00 |
| 6. | "Ya lo Pasado, Pasado" | 2:39 |
| 7. | "Viva México/Guadalajara" | 2:58 |
| 8. | "Final (Adiós Amor, Te Vas)" | 2:23 |

== Charts ==
| Chart (1991) | Peak position |
|---|---|
| US Latin Pop Albums (Billboard) | 4 |

== Sales and certifications ==
| Region | Certification | Certified units/sales |
|---|---|---|
| Bolivia | Platinum | 12,000 |
| Chile | — | 175,000 |
| United States (RIAA) | Platinum (Latin) | 100,000^{^} |
^{^} Shipments figures based on certification alone.
