= Cosas de Enamorados =

Studio album by Juan Gabriel
- Released: May 25, 1982
- Recorded: 1982
- Genre: Bolero
- Label: Ariola

Juan Gabriel chronology
Con Tu Amor (1981)	Cosas de Enamorados (1982)	Todo (1983)

Cosas de Enamorados (Things About Lovers) is the seventeenth studio album by Juan Gabriel, released in 1982.

== Track listing ==
No.	Title	Length
1.	"Ya lo Se, Que Tu Te Vas"	3:43
2.	"Si Quieres"	4:12
3.	"Es Mejor"	2:52
4.	"Noche a Noche"	2:57
5.	"Un Amor"	3:35
6.	"Insensible"	2:47
7.	"Tu Me Dijiste Adios"	3:14
8.	"Una vez Más"	3:09
9.	"No Me Vuelvo a Enamorar"	3:19
10.	"Cosas de Enamorados"	3:26
