= Me Gusta Bailar Contigo =

Studio album by Juan Gabriel
- Released: June 3, 1979
- Recorded: 1978–1979
- Genre: Latin pop, disco
- Label: RCA Records

Juan Gabriel chronology
Mis Ojos Tristes (1978)	Me Gusta Bailar Contigo (1979)	Recuerdos (1980)

Me Gusta Bailar Contigo (English: I Like To Dance With You) is the twelfth studio album by Juan Gabriel, originally released in 1979 and re-released in 1996 as Del otro lado del puente. This album features songs from the film Del otro lado del puente.

== Track listing ==
No.	Title	Length
1.	"Cuando Volveras A Mexico"	3:30
2.	"Nadie Baila Como Tu"	4:25
3.	"Nada, Nada, Nada"	3:14
4.	"Queriendote Alcanzar (Instrumental)"	3:19
5.	"Buenos Dias Señor Sol"	2:39
6.	"Me Gusta Bailar Contigo"	5:11
7.	"Everybody Dance In Acapulco"	3:58
8.	"Nadie Es Como Tu"	2:24
9.	"Marisol"	2:31
10.	"Para Siempre Adios"	3:14
