= Abrázame Muy Fuerte (album) =

Studio album by Juan Gabriel
- Released: December 12, 2000
- Recorded: 2000
- Genre: Latin pop
- Label: Sony RCA International
- Producer: Bebu Silvetti · Luigi González · Ricardo Cortez

Juan Gabriel chronology
Con la Banda...El Recodo (1998)	Abrázame Muy Fuerte (2000)	Por Los Siglos (2001)

Abrázame Muy Fuerte (English: Hold Me Tightly) is the twenty-fifth studio album by Mexican singer-songwriter Juan Gabriel, released by BMG U.S. Latin on December 12, 2000. The title track is the theme song for the Mexican telenovela Abrázame Muy Fuerte (2000–2001), produced by Salvador Mejía Alejandre, Victoria Ruffo, Fernando Colunga and Aracely Arámbula starred as the protagonists, while César Évora, Nailea Norvind, Helena Rojo and Rossana San Juan, portrayed the antagonists. In 2002, the album was awarded at the Premio Lo Nuestro for Pop Album of the Year and was nominated for a Grammy Award for Best Latin Pop Album in the 44th Annual Grammy Awards.

== Track listing ==
All tracks are written by Juan Gabriel.

No.	Title	Length
1.	"A Mi Me Gusta Soñar"	4:19
2.	"Princesita"	5:04
3.	"Tu Más Fiel Admirador"	3:22
4.	"Del Altar Hasta la Tumba"	4:07
5.	"El Amor de Nosotros a dúo con Tamara"	3:29
6.	"Abrázame Muy Fuerte"	3:59
7.	"Padre, Dame Tu Consejo"	3:45
8.	"Catalina"	4:49
9.	"Olvidar No Se"	4:07
10.	"Heme Aquí"	5:52
11.	"Amor Propio"	5:01
12.	"Estos Son Recuerdos"	4:37

== Personnel ==
- Antonio Alvarado – vocals
- Ricardo Cortez – producer
- Valério Do Carmo – graphic design
- Juan Gabriel – vocals
- Luigie "LUGO" Gonzalez – Producer/Engineer
- Enrique Okamura – production coordination
- Bebu Silvetti – producer
- César Vera – photography
- German Villacorta – engineer

== Charts ==
Chart (2000–2001)	Peak position
US Top Latin Albums (Billboard)	2
US Latin Pop Albums (Billboard)	1
US Heatseekers Albums (Billboard)	15

== Sales and certifications ==
Region	Certification	Certified units/sales
Mexico (AMPROFON)	Platinum	150,000^{‡}
United States (RIAA)	5× Platinum (Latin)	300,000^{‡}
^{‡} Sales+streaming figures based on certification alone.
