= Juan Gabriel =

Mexican singer and songwriter (1950–2016)

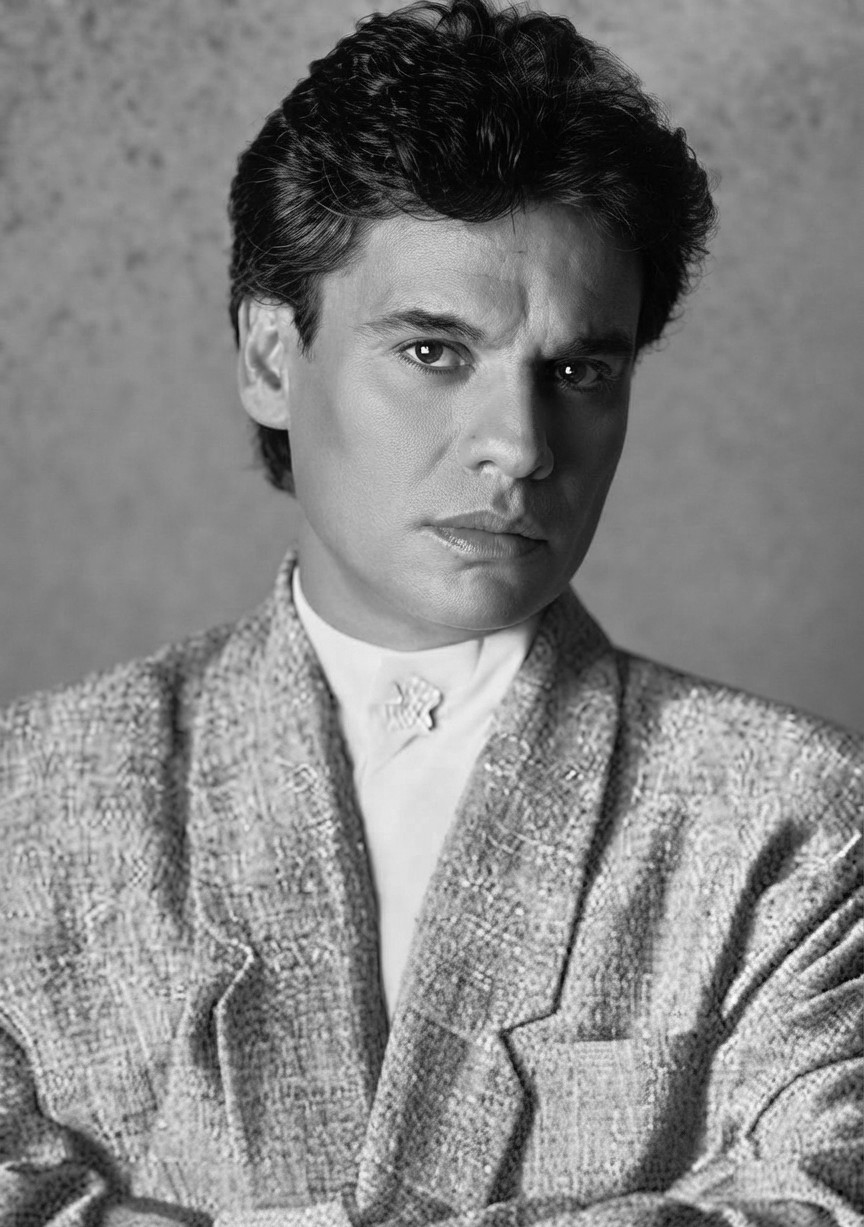
- Juan Gabriel in 1985
- Born: Alberto Aguilera Valadez; 7 January 1950; Parácuaro, Michoacán, Mexico
- Died: 28 August 2016 (aged 66); Santa Monica, California, U.S.
- Other names: Juanga; El Divo de Juárez; Adán Luna
- Occupations: Musician; singer; songwriter
- Awards: Full list
- Musical career
- Origin: Ciudad Juárez, Chihuahua, Mexico
- Genres: Ranchera; Regional Mexican; Latin pop; Canción melódica; Mariachi
- Works: Juan Gabriel discography
- Years active: 1971–2016
- Labels: RCA; BMG; Fonovisa; Universal
- Website: juangabriel.com

Alberto Aguilera Valadez (Spanish pronunciation: [alˈβeɾto aɣiˈleɾa βalaˈðes]; 7 January 1950 – 28 August 2016), known professionally as Juan Gabriel (pronounced [ˈxwaŋ ɡaˈβɾjel]), was a Mexican singer-songwriter. Colloquially nicknamed Juanga (pronounced [ˈxwaŋɡa]) and El Divo de Juárez, Juan Gabriel was known for his flamboyant style, which broke norms and standards within the Latin music industry. Widely regarded as one of the best and most prolific Mexican composers and singers of all time, he is considered a pop icon.

Juan Gabriel is one of the best-selling Latin music artists in history and the top-selling Mexican artist of all time, with over 100 million records sold worldwide. (Note: The figure of 100 million records sold is supported by multiple sources. Billboard estimates the figure at 150 million.) His nineteenth studio album, Recuerdos, Vol. II, is reportedly the best-selling album of all time in Mexico, with over eight million copies sold. During his career, Juan Gabriel wrote around 1,800 songs.

Some of his most popular, signature songs include titles such as "Amor eterno", "Querida", "Yo no nací para amar", "Hasta que te conocí", "El Noa Noa", "No tengo dinero", "Abrázame muy fuerte", "Te lo pido por favor", "Costumbres", "En esta primavera", "Pero qué necesidad", "La Farsante", "Debo Hacerlo", "Te sigo amando", "Yo No Sé Qué Me Pasó", "Siempre en mi mente", "De mí enamórate" and "Lo pasado, pasado"; amongst perhaps his most acclaimed songs are "Se me olvidó otra vez" and the heartbreaking ballad "Así Fue", popularized by and sung with Isabel Pantoja of Spain. Many of his compositions have been performed by and with other artists. In 2023, he ranked number 172 on Rolling Stone's list of the 200 Greatest Singers of All Time. The following year, the Library of Congress selected his recording of "Amor eterno" for preservation in the United States National Recording Registry.

== Early life ==
Alberto Aguilera Valadez was born on 7 January 1950, in Parácuaro, Michoacán, Mexico. The son of Gabriel Aguilera Rodríguez and Victoria Valadez Rojas, of the influential Macias-Valadéz of Jalisco, Juan was the youngest of their ten children. During Juan's childhood, his father was interned into a psychiatric hospital. Given the family's challenges, Aguilera's mother moved them to Ciudad Juárez, Chihuahua, and Alberto was enrolled and resided in the El Tribunal boarding school for eight years, where he met the director Micaela Alvarado and teacher Juan Contreras; becoming very close with Contreras, at age 13 young Aguilar ran away from El Tribunal school and lived with him for a year. In the same year, he composed his first song. At age 14, Aguilera returned to live with his mother in the city center. Aguilera became interested in a local Methodist Church, and met the sisters Leonor and Beatriz Berúmen, who took him in. There, he sang in the choir and helped out with cleaning the church. Nonetheless, young Aguilera still identified as a Catholic.

In 1965, at age 15, Aguilera debuted on the Notivisa (now Gala TV Ciudad Juárez) television show Noches Rancheras. On the program, host Raúl Loya gave Alberto Aguilera the pseudonym "Adán Luna" while he sang "María la Bandida" by José Alfredo Jiménez. From 1966 to 1968 (until roughly his eighteenth birthday), he worked as a singer at the Noa-Noa bar. During this time, he also penned "El Noa Noa". Aguilera also worked as a singer in other bars around town. Later, he traveled to Mexico City looking for opportunities at record companies, but found none. He returned to Juárez, where he continued working locally. The next year, he attempted again to find a recording contract. At RCA Víctor, he was hired by Eduardo Magallanes to work as a backing vocalist, primarily for Roberto Jordan, Angélica María and Estela Núñez. In 1970, he resigned, as he had received insufficient payment for his singing, and returned to work in the Juárez bars.

With many telling him he would have success if he simply tried again, Aguilera returned to Mexico City a third time in 1971. Not having any money, he often slept in local bus or train stations. At one point, he was incorrectly accused of robbery, and was incarcerated in Palacio de Lecumberri Prison for about 18 months. During this time, he wrote several songs, including "Tres Claveles y Un Rosal" and "Me He Quedado Solo"; these compositions attracted the attention of Lecumberri's prison warden Andrés Puentes Vargas, who later introduced him to Mexican singer-actress Enriqueta Jiménez Chabolla, better known as La Prieta Linda, as well as to Vargas's wife Ofelia Urtuzuastegui Ruiz. Ruiz and her husband greatly helped Aguilera, and with their assistance and a clear lack of any wrongdoing, he was released from prison, living at their home for about two years. Aguilera's adoptive "parents" provided him shelter, protection and support, and the right type of living environment to compose more songs with which to launch his professional music career as "Juan Gabriel".

== Career ==
La Prieta Linda helped Aguilera at RCA Víctor, where he signed a recording contract. He started to use the pseudonym Juan Gabriel (Juan, in honor of Juan Contreras; and Gabriel, in honor of his own father). In 1971, Juan Gabriel released his first studio album El Alma Joven..., which included the song "No Tengo Dinero", which became his debut single and his first hit. El Alma Joven... was certified as gold by the Asociación Mexicana de Productores de Fonogramas y Videogramas (AMPROFON).

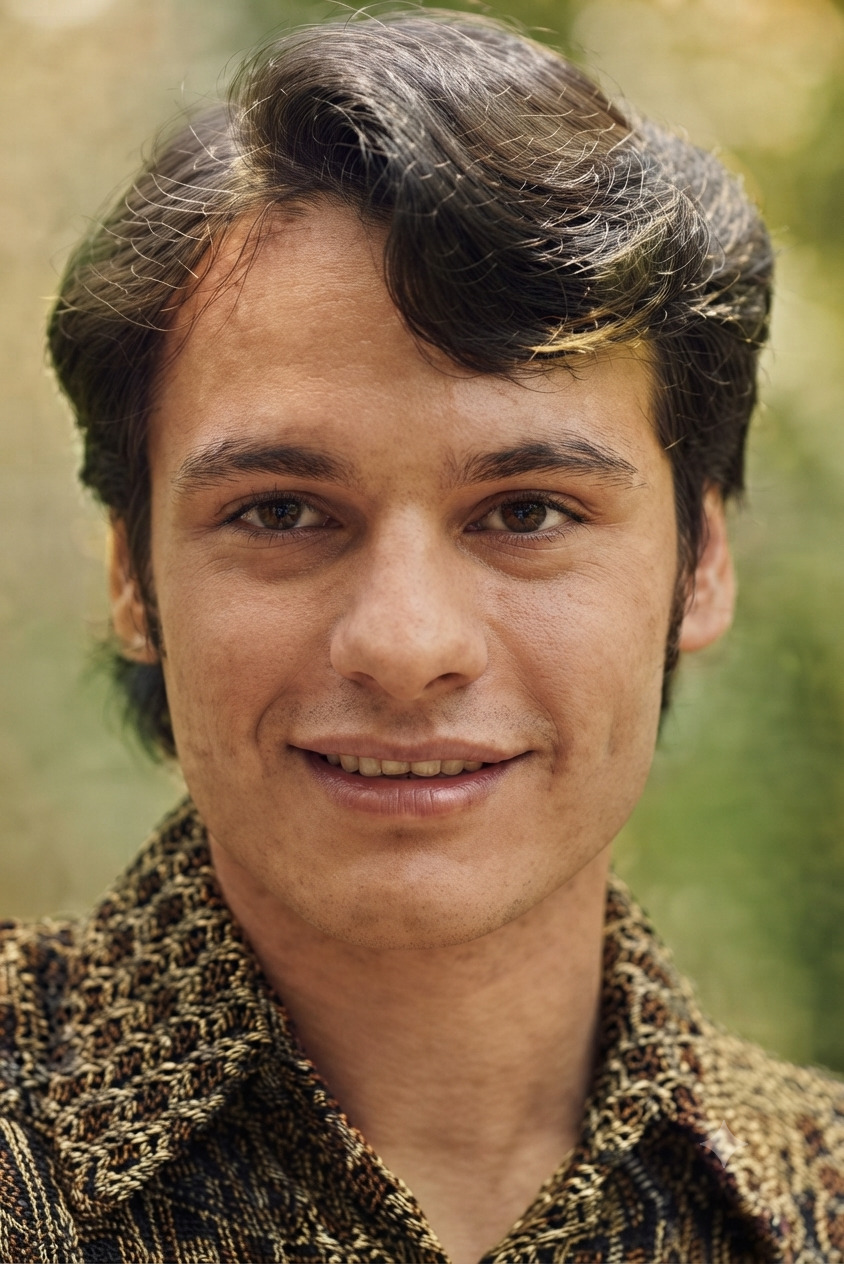
Juan Gabriel in 1972

In 1972, Juan Gabriel participated at the Mexican national selection for the OTI Festival, where he performed its own songs "Será mañana" and "Uno, dos, tres (y me das un beso)". The songs were not selected to represent Mexico, but they were acclaimed by record company executives and later recorded for his second album El Alma Joven II. After releasing El Alma Joven III (1973), Juan Gabriel released his first mariachi album featuring the group Vargas de Tecalitlán. The album, titled Juan Gabriel con el Mariachi Vargas de Tecalitlán (1974), includes songs like "Se Me Olvidó Otra Vez" and "Lágrimas y Lluvia". In 1975, Juan Gabriel made his acting debut in the film Nobleza ranchera with Sara García and Verónica Castro.

Over the next fifteen years, Juan Gabriel's fame grew as he recorded 15 albums and sold 20 million records. He wrote and recorded over 1,000 songs in a variety of musical genres. Juan Gabriel established himself as Mexico's leading commercial singer-songwriter, writing songs in diverse styles like rancheras with mariachis, ballads, pop, rock en español, and disco. Juan Gabel wrote hit records for himself and other leading Latin singers including Lucha Villa, Daniela Romo, Ana Gabriel and international stars Luis Miguel, Rocío Dúrcal, and Isabel Pantoja. In 1978, José José achieved international recognition with the ballad "Lo Pasado, Pasado," written by Juan Gabriel. His lyrics dealt with heartbreak and romantic relationships that became hymns throughout Latin America, Spain, and the United States. In 1984, his song "Querida" ("Darling") remained at number one on the Mexican charts for a year. He also received a Grammy nomination for "Best Latin Pop Album" for Recuerdos, Vol. II, which includes the single release version of the song.

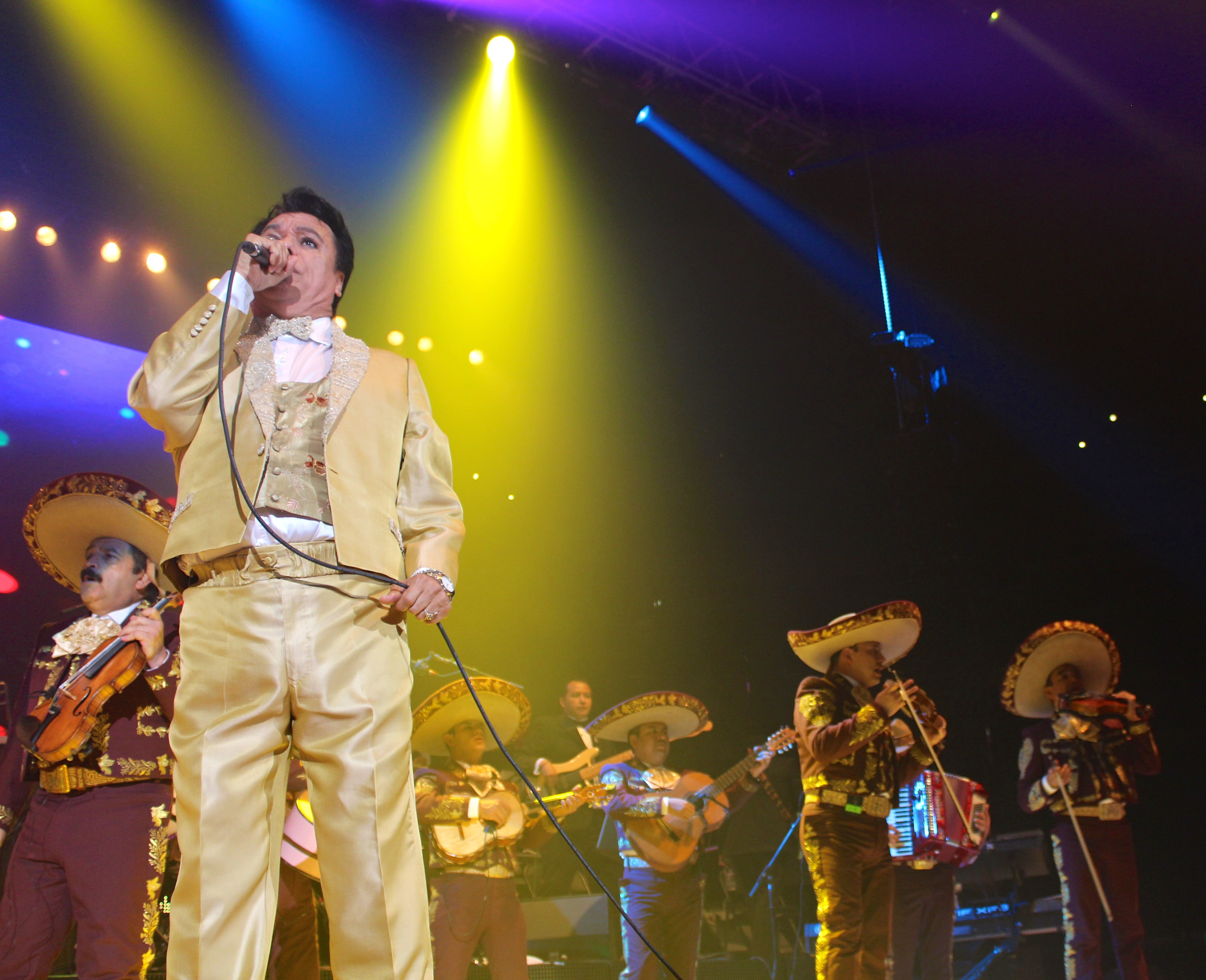
Gabriel performing in 2014

His work as an arranger, producer and songwriter throughout the subsequent decades brought him into contact with the leading Latin artists of the day, including Rocío Dúrcal and Isabel Pantoja. In addition to recording numerous hits on his own, Juan Gabriel has produced albums for Dúrcal, Lucha Villa, Lola Beltrán and Paul Anka. In 1984, he released Recuerdos, Vol. II which one source says is the best-selling album of all time in Mexico, selling over eight million copies. In 1990 Juan Gabriel became the first non-classical act to perform at the Palacio de Bellas Artes. The proceeds from the three sold-out concerts were given to the National Symphony Orchestra. On 31 July 2000, a telenovela titled Abrázame Muy Fuerte began broadcasting in Mexico. Salvador Mejía, the producer, choose to use the song of the same name as its main theme. "Abrázame Muy Fuerte" ended 2001 as the most successful Latin single of the year. For the song, Juan Gabriel won two Billboard Latin Music Awards in 2002 for Hot Latin Track of the Year and Latin Pop Airplay Track of the Year; and also received the Songwriter of the Year award. The song ranked seventh at the Hot Latin Songs 25th Anniversary chart. "Abrázame Muy Fuerte" also was awarded for Pop Song of the Year at the 2002 Lo Nuestro Awards. At the time of his death, Juan Gabriel was touring the United States and was scheduled to perform at a concert in El Paso, Texas, that same day. He also had four albums which reached number one on the Top Latin Albums from 2015 and 2016, including Vestido de Etiqueta por Eduardo Magallanes, which reached number one a week before he died. He holds the record for most albums peaking at number one on the Top Latin Albums chart over a short time.

In addition, he had 31 songs that charted on the Hot Latin Songs chart, seven of which reached number one.

=== BMG copyright dispute ===
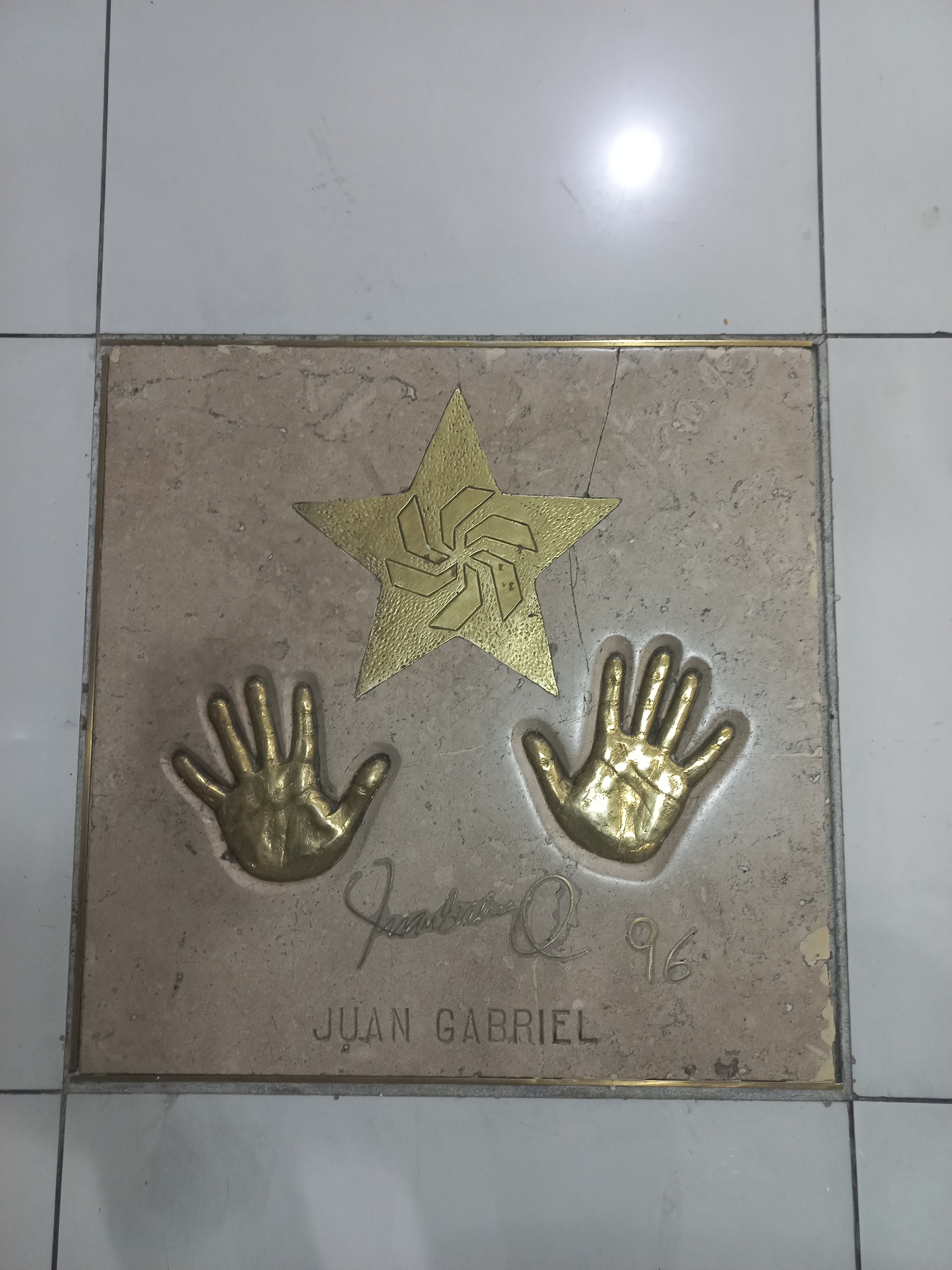
Hands of Juan Gabriel embodied in 1996 in the Plaza de las Estrellas located in Mexico City

Between 1986 and 1994, Juan Gabriel refused to record any material because of a dispute with BMG over copyrights to his songs. He continued his career in live stage performances, setting attendance records throughout Latin America. By 1994 the copyright dispute reached a resolution under an agreement whereby ownership of the songs reverted to Juan Gabriel over a specified time period. After this dispute, which lasted 8 years, he released an album titled, "Gracias Por Esperar," which in English, translates to, "Thank You For Waiting". The record label then selected eleven previously released tracks from Juan Gabriel's catalog in order to release "Debo Hacerlo", the last new song recorded by the artist.

== Personal life ==
Juan Gabriel was never married. He had six children, four of them named Juan in different languages. The mother of four of his children is Laura Salas. Juan Gabriel stated that Salas was "the best friend of my life" ("la mejor amiga de mi vida" in Spanish). Nearly a month after his death, the news program Primer Impacto discovered that Juan Gabriel had a fifth child, a son living in Las Vegas. The two maintained a long-distance relationship, primarily communicating via e-mail. The mother of his fifth child is Guadalupe Gonzalez, who worked as Juan Gabriel's domestic employee. On 26 October 2016, Primer Impacto found the sixth child of Juan Gabriel living in Los Angeles, California. His mother is Consuelo Rosales, who also worked as Juan Gabriel's domestic employee. Genetic testing was conducted to confirm parentage.

Although he was widely assumed to be gay, Juan Gabriel never explicitly talked about his sexuality. However, as he got older he began to give implicit responses towards questions about his sexuality, saying to interviewers "Lo que se ve no se pregunta" ("what one sees doesn't have to be asked about"). Some may interpret this to be an implicit affirmation of homosexuality, while others have interpreted this to be an affirmation of heterosexuality, due to the female romantic partners he had.

In June 2005, Gabriel was arrested for alleged tax fraud. On 14 November 2005, Juan Gabriel was injured when he fell from the stage at the Toyota Center in Houston, Texas, and was hospitalized at Texas Medical Center. He sustained a cervical fracture on his neck, forcing him to refrain from performing on tour while being bedridden for eight months.

=== Political views ===
Juan Gabriel was a lifelong supporter of the Institutional Revolutionary Party (PRI), which governed Mexico from 1929 to 2000 and from 2012 to 2018. In 1994, he stated that "his best friends [were] from the PRI" and he campaigned in support of then-presidential PRI candidate Ernesto Zedillo. In the 2000 election he again campaigned for the PRI candidate, Francisco Labastida (who eventually lost the election). In 2015, he wrote a letter to the then-President of Mexico Enrique Peña Nieto (a member of the PRI), expressing his support for his administration and for the PRI, which he stated, "will never go away".

== Death ==
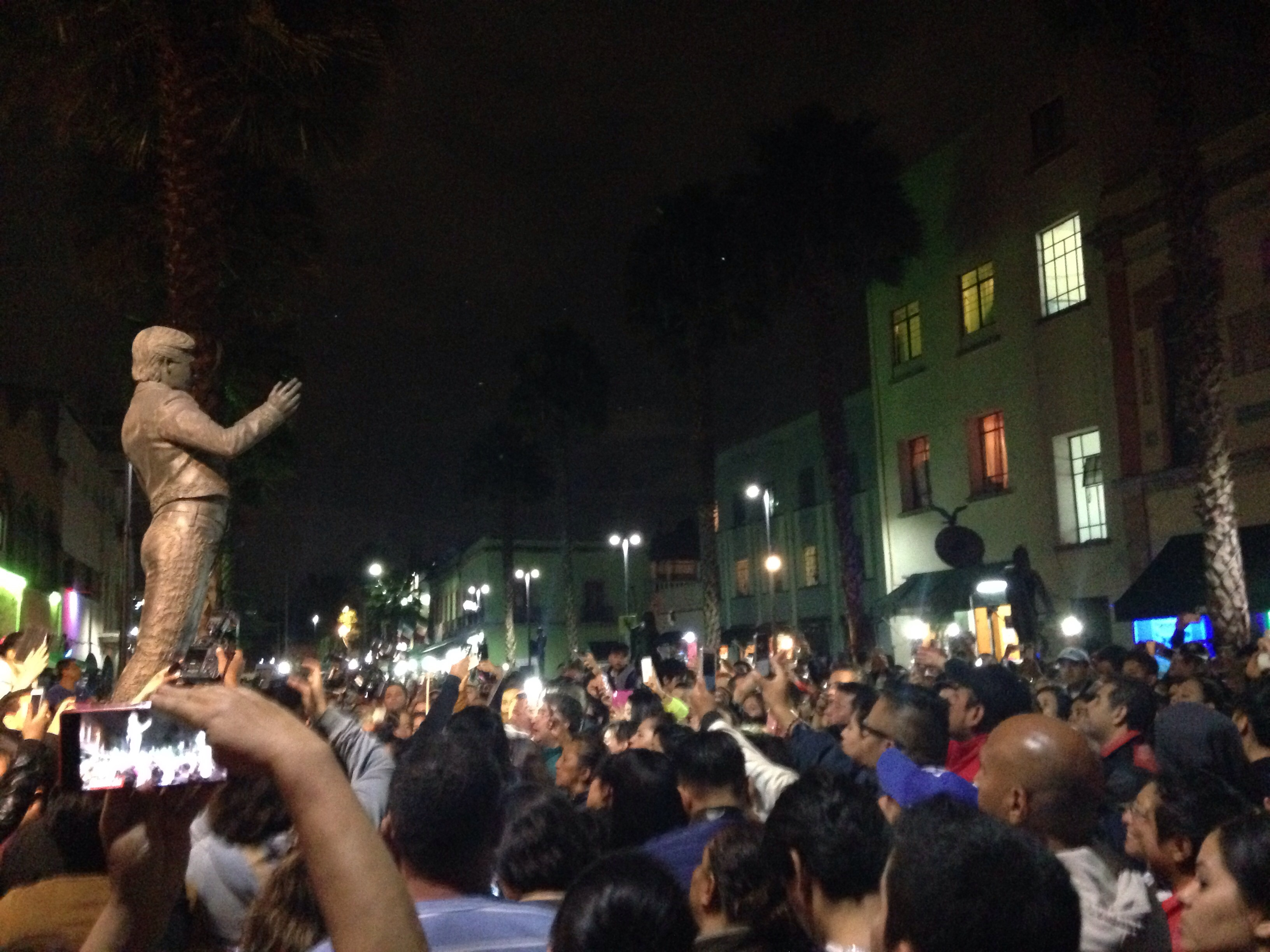
Statue of Juan Gabriel in Plaza Garibaldi, Mexico City, on 28 August 2016. Crowds gathered to pay their respects on the day of his death.

On 28 August 2016, Juan Gabriel died in Santa Monica, California, reportedly from a heart attack. Gabriel's body was cremated; his ashes were returned to a house he owned in Ciudad Juárez, Chihuahua, after receiving tributes from the city and Palacio de Bellas Artes in Mexico City. An autopsy was not performed to determine the cause of death.

== Charitable work ==
Juan Gabriel continued to do 10 to 12 performances per year as benefit concerts for his favorite children's homes, usually posing for pictures with his fans and forwarding the proceeds from the photo ops to support Mexican orphans. In 1987, he founded Semjase, a house for orphaned and underserved children located in Ciudad Juárez, Chihuahua. It serves school children between the ages of 6 and 12.

== Legacy and impact ==
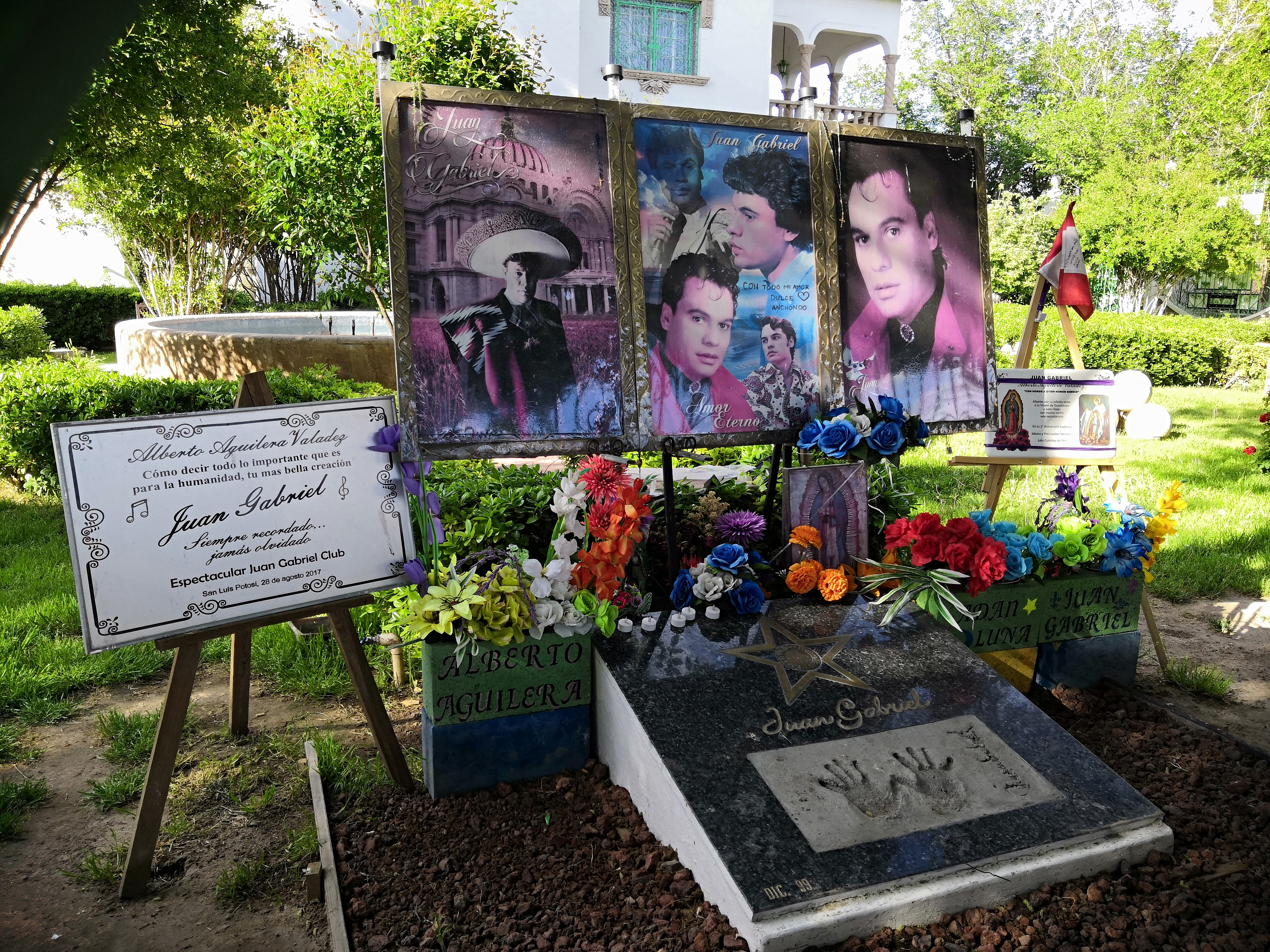
Memorial located at Juan Gabriel's house in Juárez

In 2015, Billboard listed Juan Gabriel among their list of the 30 most influential Latino artists in history, citing his "dramatic performance style" and his redefined concept of romantic Latin pop music. The publication noted Gabriel's appeal among several generations of Latino Americans and artists. In his list of the most influential Latin music artists in history, Carlos Quintana of About.com, ranked Juan Gabriel number six for shaping "the sounds of Mexican music" and exploring genres from ranchera to Latin pop. In 1986, Los Angeles Mayor Tom Bradley declared 5 October Juan Gabriel day. He received the Lo Nuestro Excellence Award in 1991. In 1996, he was inducted into the Billboard Latin Music Hall of Fame, while in 2003 he was inducted into the International Latin Music Hall of Fame, and posthumously inducted into the Latin Songwriters Hall of Fame in October 2016. In 2023, Rolling Stone ranked Juan Gabriel at number 172 on its list of the 200 Greatest Singers of All Time.

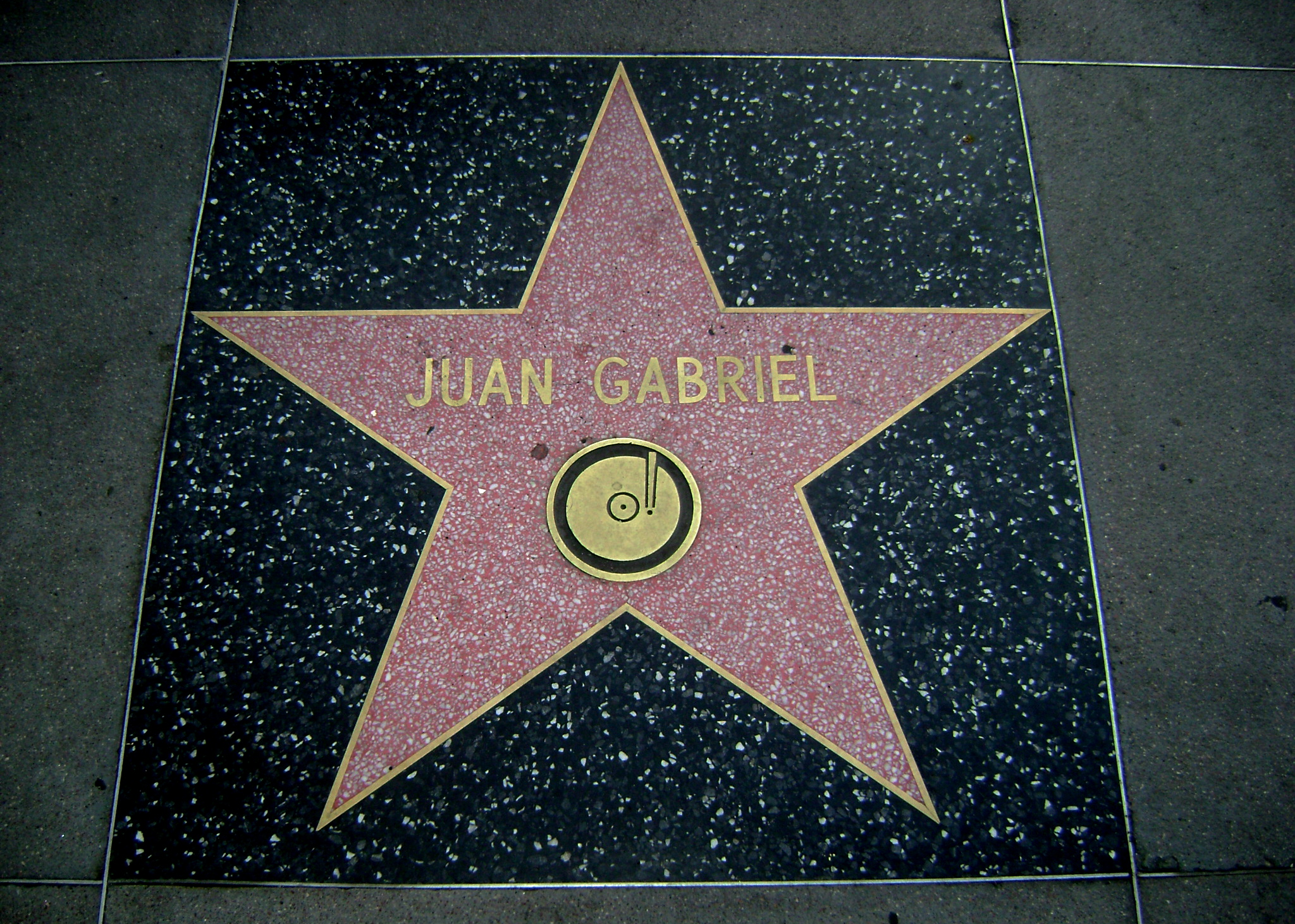
Juan Gabriel's star on the Hollywood Walk of Fame

The American Society of Composers, Authors and Publishers (ASCAP) honored Juan Gabriel the Latin Songwriter of the Year Award in 1995, 1996, and 1998. In 1999, Gabriel received the People's Choice Awards for Best Regional Artist. That same year, he received the La Opinión Tributo Nacional for Lifetime Achievement Award. A statue was erected by Billboard at Mexico City's Plaza Garibaldi in 2001, and remains a popular destination for mariachi performances. In 2009, the singer was honored as the Latin Recording Academy's Person of the Year. That same year, he was awarded a spot on the Las Vegas Walk of Stars. He also received his own star on the Hollywood Walk of Fame in May 2002.

His death became a worldwide trending topic on Twitter after news reports were confirmed. President of Mexico Enrique Peña Nieto, called him one of Mexico's "greatest musical icons". United States President Barack Obama also commented on Juan Gabriel's death and complimented his music for "transcending borders and generations" and that "his spirit will live on in his enduring songs, and in the hearts of the fans who love him". Gabriel Abaroa, the CEO of the Latin Recording Academy, said his legacy was "much more than one or hundreds of songs; he composed philosophy" and that Juan Gabriel "broke taboos, devoured stages and conquered diverse audiences". Leila Cobo of Billboard proclaimed Juan Gabriel as a "prodigal performer" and noted that his songs were "romantic, colloquial, emotional compositions that sometimes rambled but managed to strike a universal chord with lyrics that could apply to many people and many situations."

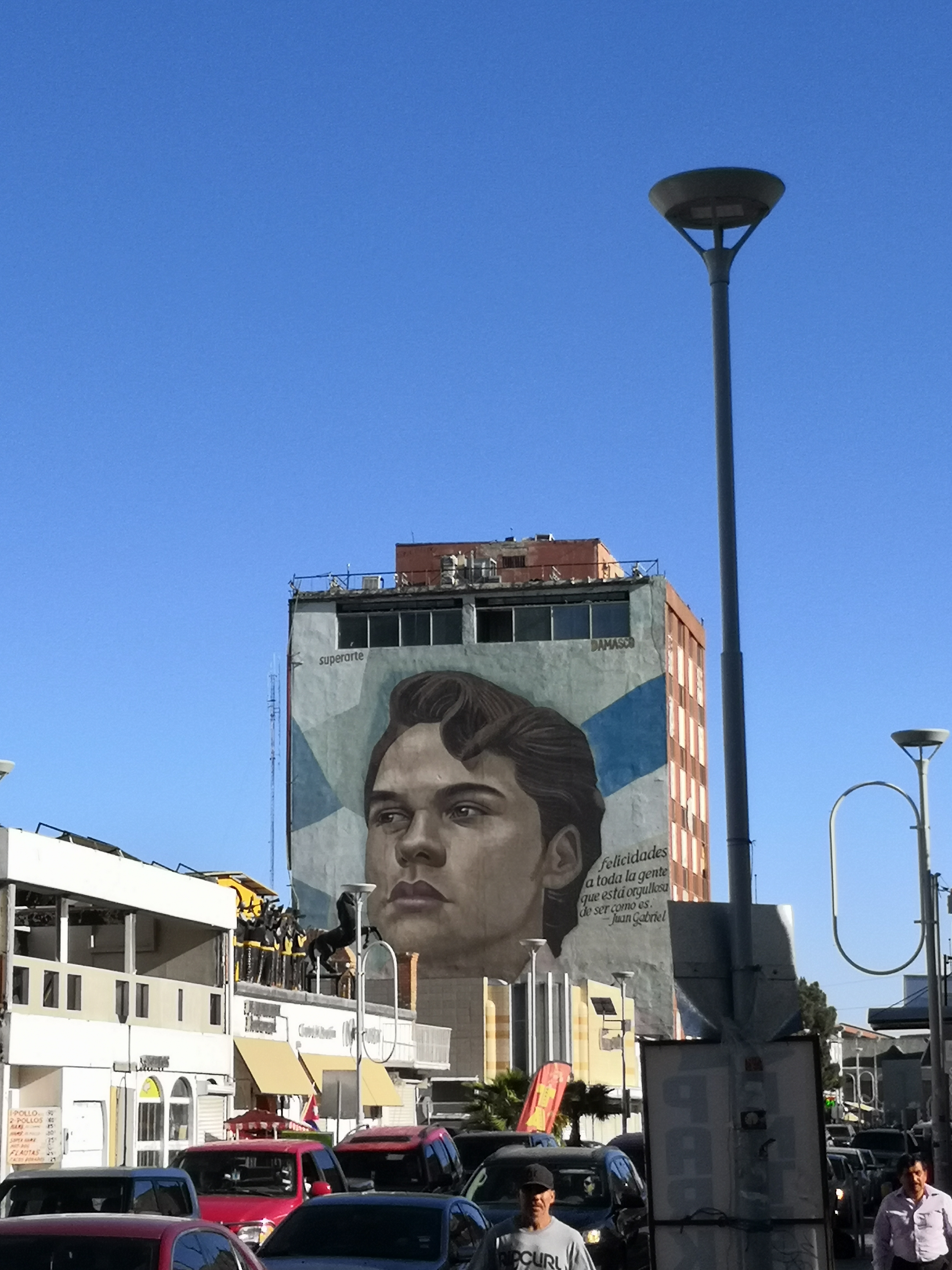
Mural made in tribute to Juan Gabriel located in Ciudad Juárez, Mexico

Gabriel's songs have been covered by artists such as Rocío Dúrcal, Gloria Trevi, La India, and Marc Anthony, the latter of whom credits his song "Hasta Que Te Conocí" as the inspiration to launch his career in Latin music. Tribute albums to Gabriel have been recorded by several artists including Cristian Castro, Pedro Fernández, Lorenzo Antonio, Álvaro Torres, Los Tri-O, Nydia Rojas, and La India. A television series based on Gabriel's life titled Hasta que te conocí, began airing on 18 April 2016, and the series ended on 28 August, coincidentally the same day Gabriel died. He was portrayed by Colombian actor Julián Román and Juan Gabriel served as the executive producer.

== Selected films and television shows ==
- 1965: Noches Rancheras
- 1975: Nobleza ranchera
- 1976: En esta primavera
- 1978: Del otro lado del puente
- 1979: El Noa Noa
- 1980: Es mi vida
- 2013: ¿Qué Le Dijiste A Dios?

== Discography ==
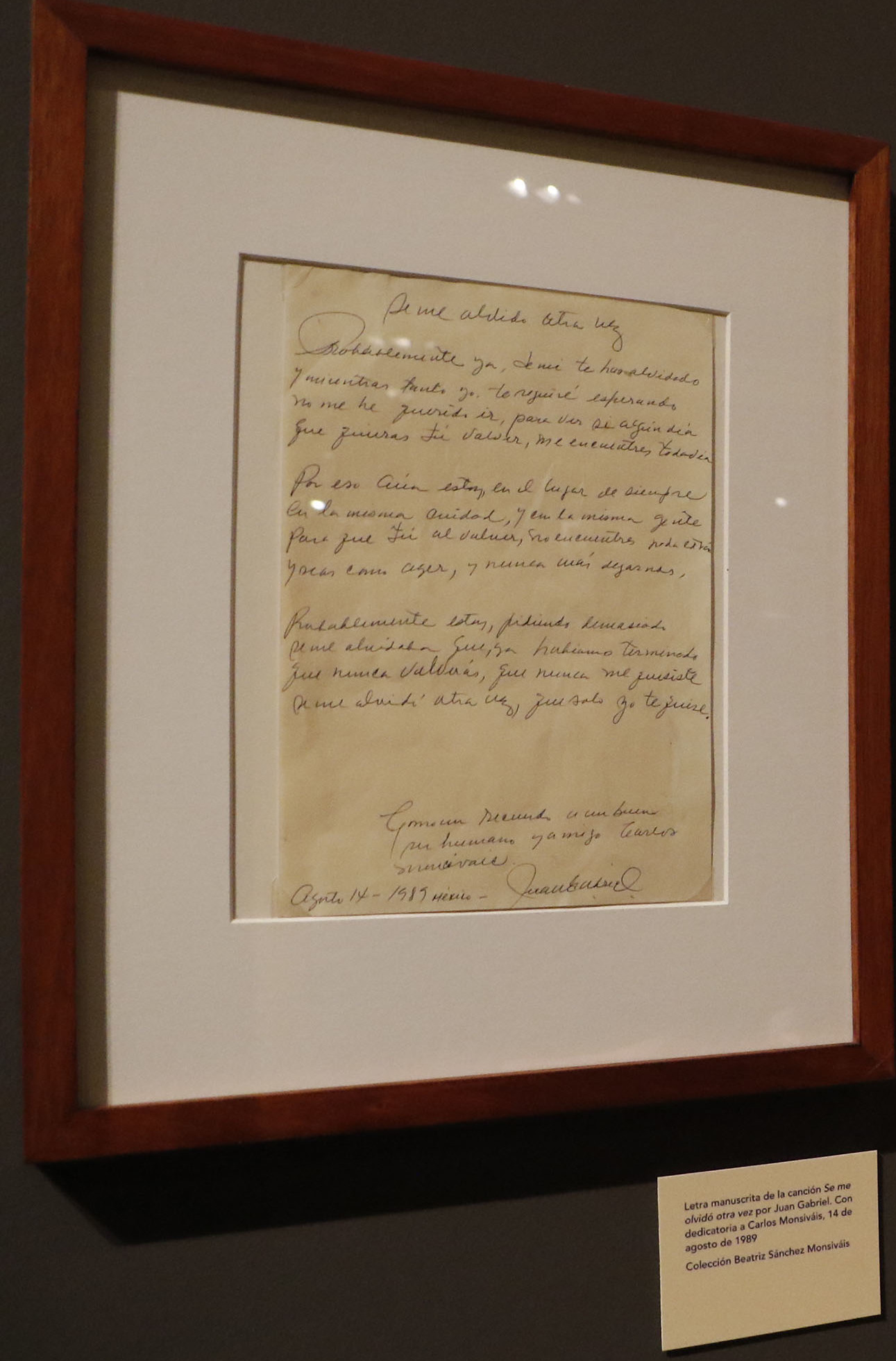
Lyrics handwritten by him of his song "Se me olvidó otra vez" with a dedication to the writer Carlos Monsiváis in August 1989

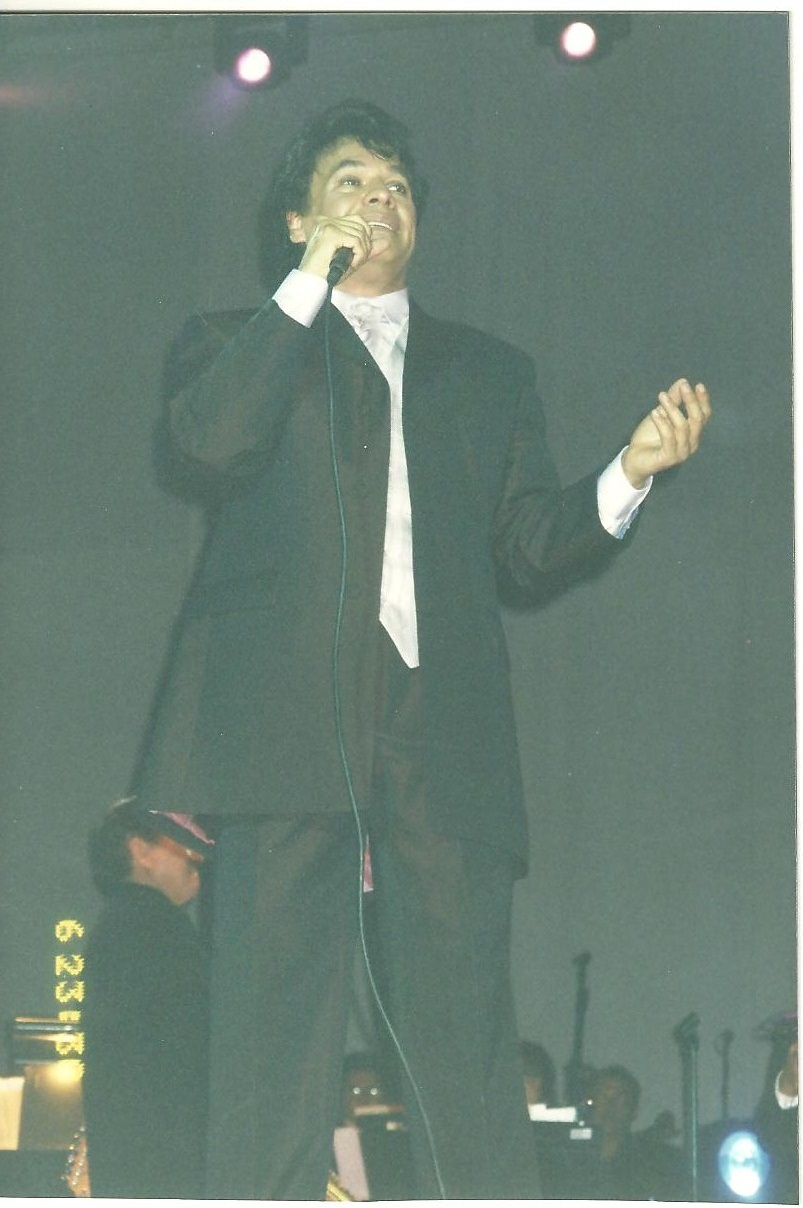
Juan Gabriel during a concert in 2003

- 1971: El Alma Joven...
- 1972: El Alma Joven Vol.II
- 1973: El Alma Joven Vol.III
- 1974: Juan Gabriel con el Mariachi Vargas de Tecalitlán
- 1975: 10 Éxitos de Juan Gabriel
- 1976: A Mi Guitarra
- 1976: Juan Gabriel con Mariachi Vol. II
- 1977: Te Llegará Mi Olvido
- 1978: Siempre en Mi Mente
- 1978: Espectacular
- 1978: Mis Ojos Tristes
- 1979: Me Gusta Bailar Contigo
- 1980: Recuerdos
- 1980: Juan Gabriel Con Mariachi
- 1980: Ella
- 1981: Con Tu Amor
- 1982: Cosas de Enamorados
- 1983: Todo
- 1984: Recuerdos, Vol. II
- 1986: Pensamientos
- 1988: Debo Hacerlo
- 1990: Juan Gabriel en el Palacio de Bellas Artes
- 1994: Gracias por Esperar
- 1995: El México Que Se Nos Fue
- 1996: Las Tres Señoras (Beltran/Mendoza/Villa) – Temas y Produccion de Juan Gabriel
- 1997: Juntos Otra Vez with Rocío Dúrcal
- 1998: Con la Banda...El Recodo with Banda El Recodo
- 1999: Todo Está Bien
- 2000: Abrázame Muy Fuerte
- 2003: Inocente de Ti
- 2010: Juan Gabriel
- 2015: Los Dúo
- 2015: Los Dúo, Vol. 2
- 2016: Vestido de Etiqueta por Eduardo Magallanes
- 2022: Los Dúo, Vol. 3
- 2023: México con Escalas en Mi Corazón (Ciudades)
- 2025: Eterno

== Concert tours ==
- Volver Tour (2014)
- Bienvenidos al Noa Noa Gira (2015)
- Mexico Es Todo Tour (2016, died during tour)

== See also ==
- List of best-selling Latin music artists
- Music of Mexico
