= List of awards and nominations received by Marc Anthony =

Marc Anthony awards and nominations
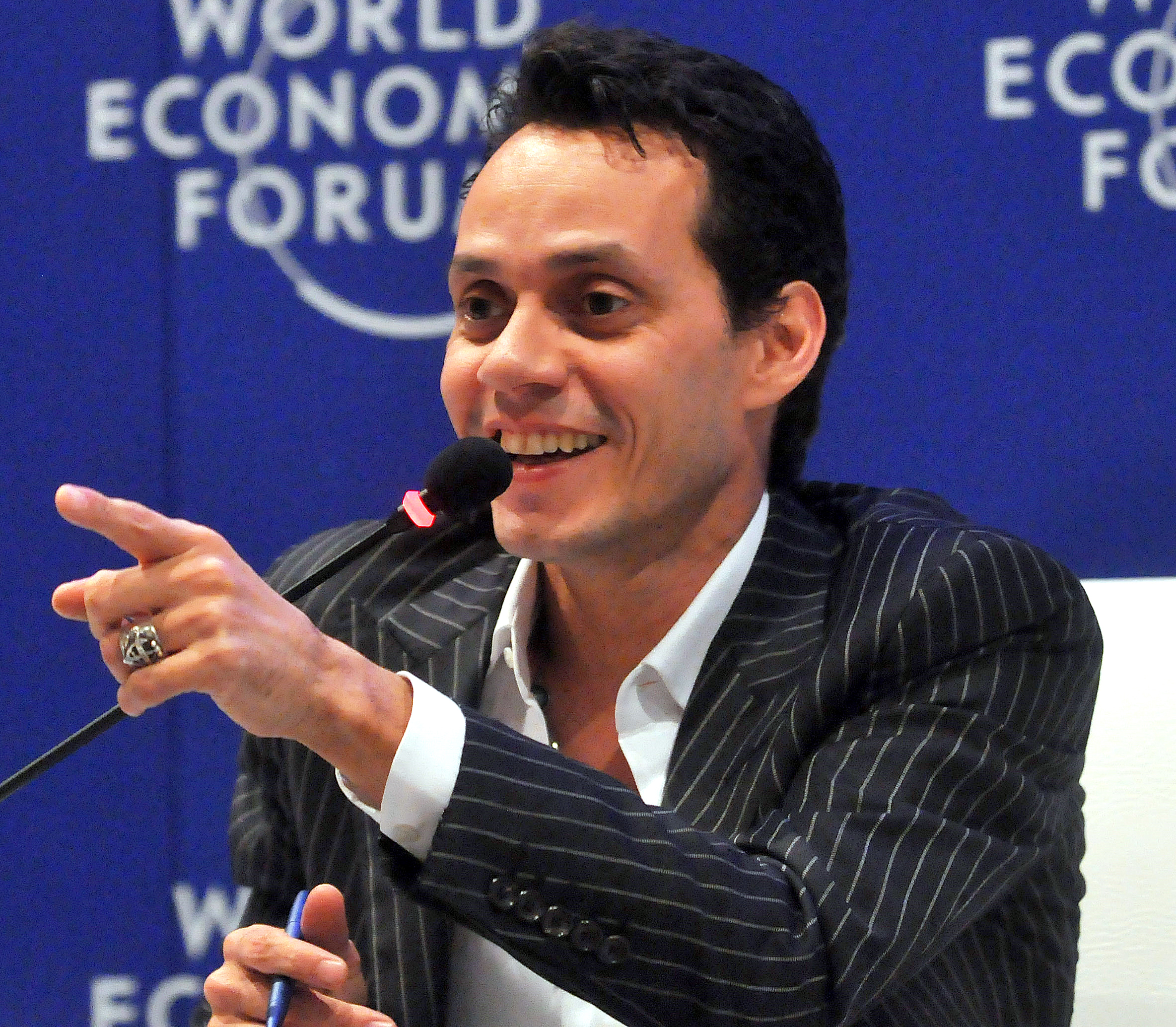
- Anthony during a press conference in 2010
Awards and nominations
Award	Wins	Nominations
ASCAP Latin Awards	9	9
Billboard Latin Music Awards	28	87
Billboard Music Awards	3	5
BMI Latin Awards	7	7
Grammy Awards	4	11
Latin Grammy Awards	9	27
Latin American Music Awards	3	18
Lo Nuestro Awards	29	97
Premios Juventud	6	48
World Music Awards	0	2

Totals (Note: Certain award groups do not simply award one winner. They acknowledge several different recipients, have runners-up, and have third place. Since this is a specific recognition and is different from losing an award, runner-up mentions are considered wins in this award tally. For simplification and to avoid errors, each award in this list has been presumed to have had a prior nomination.)
- Wins: 150
- Nominations: 432

American singer and songwriter Marc Anthony has achieved various awards and nominations through his career since his debut in the 1990s. Known as the "King of Salsa Music", he is the all-time best-selling Salsa artist, and one of the best-selling Latin singers of all-time.

Upon the release of his first album, Otra Nota (1993), he received various awards in major ceremonies, including New Artist of Tropical/Salsa at the Latin Billboard Music Awards of 1994 and a Lo Nuestro Award for Tropical New Artist of the Year of the same year. Since then, he has received a varied of other accolades and nominations, including various Premios Juventud, Latin Grammy Awards, Grammy Awards and Billboard Music Awards. He is the most awarded male singer in Lo Nuestro Awards history, earning a place in the Guinness Book of World Records. In addition, Anthony's career was recognized in various ceremony awards, including an ASCAP's Founders Award (2012), an ALMA Award's Excellence Award in Music (2006) and a Lo Nuestro Excellence Award in 2014.

Anthony also collected awards for his songwriting and concerts, including various ASCAP Awards and Viña del Mar International Song Festival's Gaviota and Antorchas de Plata and Oro when he made his debut in the festival in 2009. Outside of his work in music, he has been recognized by various organizations for his charitable endeavours, was named as Person of the Year by the Latin Recording Academy in 2016, and became the first Hispanic to receive Hasty Pudding Club's Order of the Golden Sphinx.

== Awards and nominations ==
Award/organization (Note: Charts are not included, unless they are explicitly described as "awards" or specific trophies are given.)	Year	Nominee/work	Category	Result	Ref.
ALMA Award	1999	"I Want to Spend My Lifetime Loving You"	Outstanding Performance of a Song for a Feature Film	Won	
ALMA Award	1999	"I Want to Spend My Lifetime Loving You"	Outstanding Music Video	Won	
ALMA Award	2000	"I Need to Know"	Outstanding Music Video Performer	Won	
ALMA Award	2001	Marc Anthony: The Concert from Madison Square Garden	Outstanding Music or Awards Special	Nominated	
ALMA Award	2002	Marc Anthony	Outstanding Male Performer	Won	
ALMA Award	2002	Christmas at Rockefeller Center	Outstanding Performance in a Music, Variety, or Comedy Special	Won	
ALMA Award	2002	Libre	Spanish Language Album of the Year	Won	
ALMA Award	2006	Marc Anthony	Celia Cruz Award for Excellence in Music	Honoree	
American Music Awards	2001	Marc Anthony	Favorite Adult Contemporary Artist	Nominated	
American Music Awards	2001	Marc Anthony	Favorite Pop/Rock Artist	Nominated	
American Music Awards	2001	Marc Anthony	Favorite Latin Artist	Nominated	
American Music Awards	2003	Marc Anthony	Favorite Latin Artist	Nominated	
American Music Awards	2004	Marc Anthony	Favorite Latin Artist	Won	
American Music Awards	2013	Marc Anthony	Favorite Latin Artist	Won	
American Music Awards	2014	Marc Anthony	Favorite Latin Artist	Nominated	
Apollo Theater	2010	Marc Anthony	Humanitarian Award	Honoree	
Association of Latin Entertainment Critics (Latin ACE)	1994	Marc Anthony	Best Revelation — Male, Tropical Music	Won	
Association of Latin Entertainment Critics (Latin ACE)	1997	Marc Anthony	Best Tropical Artist — Male	Won	
Association of Latin Entertainment Critics (Latin ACE)	1999	Marc Anthony (at MSG)	Best Popular Concert	Nominated	
Association of Latin Entertainment Critics (Latin ACE)	2002	Marc Anthony	Male Tropical Artist	Nominated	
ASCAP Latin Award	2012	Marc Anthony	The Founders Award	Honoree	
ASCAP Latin Award	2003	"Celos"	Winning Songs — Pop	Won	
ASCAP Latin Award	2016	"Deja Que Te Bese"	Winning Songs — Pop	Won	
ASCAP Latin Award	2016	"Traidora"	Winning Songs — Pop	Won	
ASCAP Latin Award	2020	"Parecen Viernes"	Winning Writers	Won	
ASCAP Latin Award	2021	"Lo Que te Di"	Winning Writers	Won	
ASCAP Latin Award	2023	"Mala"	Winning Writers	Won	
ASCAP Latin Award	2023	"Pa'llá Voy"	Winning Writers	Won	
ASCAP Latin Award	2024	"La Fórmula"	Winning Writers	Won	
ASCAP Pop Award	2002	"I Need to Know"	Winning-Songs	Won	
ASCAP Pop Award	2002	"You Sang to Me"	Winning-Songs	Won	
Billboard Latin Music Awards	1994	Marc Anthony	Tropical/Salsa Artist of the Year, New Artist	Won	
Billboard Latin Music Awards	1996	"Te Conozco Bien"	Tropical/Salsa Hot Latin Track of the Year	Won	
Billboard Latin Music Awards	1996	Todo a su Tiempo	Tropical/Salsa Album of The Year, Male	Won	
Billboard Latin Music Awards	1998	"Y Hubo Alguien"	Tropical/Salsa Song of the Year	Won	
Billboard Latin Music Awards	1998	Contra la Corriente	Tropical/Salsa Album of the Year, Male	Won	
Billboard Latin Music Awards	1999	"Contra la Corriente"	Tropical/Salsa Latin Track of the Year	Nominated	
Billboard Latin Music Awards	1999	Marc Anthony	Hot Latin Track Artist of the Year	Nominated	
Billboard Latin Music Awards	2000	"No Me Ames" (Jennifer Lopez featuring Marc Anthony)	Tropical/Salsa Track of the Year	Nominated	
Billboard Latin Music Awards	2000	"No Me Ames" (Jennifer Lopez featuring Marc Anthony)	Hot Latin Track of the Year	Nominated	
Billboard Latin Music Awards	2000	"No Me Ames" (Jennifer Lopez featuring Marc Anthony)	Hot Latin Tracks of the Year, Vocal Duo	Won	
Billboard Latin Music Awards	2001	Marc Anthony	Billboard Latin 50 Artists of the year	Nominated	
Billboard Latin Music Awards	2001	Marc Anthony	Hot Latin Tracks Artist of the Year	Nominated	
Billboard Latin Music Awards	2001	"Muy Dentro de Mí"	Latin Pop Track of the Year	Nominated	
Billboard Latin Music Awards	2001	"Muy Dentro de Mí"	Tropical/Salsa Track of the Year	Nominated	
Billboard Latin Music Awards	2001	"Muy Dentro de Mí"	Hot Latin Track of the Year	Nominated	
Billboard Latin Music Awards	2001	"Muy Dentro de Mí"	Latin Dance Maxi-Single of the Year	Nominated	
Billboard Latin Music Awards	2001	Desde un Principio: From the Beginning	Latin Greatest-Hits Album of the Year	Won	
Billboard Latin Music Awards	2002	Marc Anthony	Top Latin Albums Artist of the Year	Won	
Billboard Latin Music Awards	2002	Libre	Tropical/Salsa Album of the Year, Male	Nominated	
Billboard Latin Music Awards	2005	Marc Anthony	Telemundo Star Award	Honoree	
Billboard Latin Music Awards	2003	"Viviendo"	Tropical/Salsa Airplay Track of the Year, Male	Won	
Billboard Latin Music Awards	2006	"Tu Amor Me Hace Bien"	Tropical Airplay Song of the Year	Nominated	
Billboard Latin Music Awards	2006	Marc Anthony, Alejandro Fernández & Chayanne	Latin Tour of the Year	Nominated	
Billboard Latin Music Awards	2007	"Que Precio Tiene El Cielo"	Tropical Airplay Song of the Year, Male	Won	
Billboard Latin Music Awards	2007	"Sigo Siendo Yo"	Latin Greatest Hits Album of the Year	Nominated	
Billboard Latin Music Awards	2008	El Cantante	Tropical Album of the Year, Male	Nominated	
Billboard Latin Music Awards	2008	"Mi Gente"	Tropical Airplay Song of the Year	Nominated	
Billboard Latin Music Awards	2010	Marc Anthony	Spirit of Hope	Honoree	
Billboard Latin Music Awards	2011	Marc Anthony	Top Latin Albums Artist of the Year, Male	Nominated	
Billboard Latin Music Awards	2011	Marc Anthony	Latin Pop Albums Artist of the Year, Solo	Nominated	
Billboard Latin Music Awards	2011	Marc Anthony	Latin Touring Artist of the Year	Nominated	
Billboard Latin Music Awards	2011	Iconos	Latin Digital Album of the Year	Nominated	
Billboard Latin Music Awards	2011	Iconos	Latin Album of the Year	Nominated	
Billboard Latin Music Awards	2011	Iconos	Latin Pop Album of the Year	Nominated	
Billboard Latin Music Awards	2012	Marc Anthony	Latin Music Hall of Fame	Inductee	
Billboard Latin Music Awards	2013	GIGANT3S: Marc Anthony, Chayanne & Marco Antonio Solís	Latin Touring Artist of the Year	Nominated	
Billboard Latin Music Awards	2014	Marc Anthony	Artist of the Year	Won	
Billboard Latin Music Awards	2014	Marc Anthony	Tour of the Year	Nominated	
Billboard Latin Music Awards	2014	Marc Anthony	Hot Latin Songs Artist of the Year, Male	Nominated	
Billboard Latin Music Awards	2014	Marc Anthony	Top Latin Albums Artist of the Year, Male	Won	
Billboard Latin Music Awards	2014	Marc Anthony	Latin Pop Songs Artist of the Year, Solo	Nominated	
Billboard Latin Music Awards	2014	Marc Anthony	Tropical Songs Artist of the Year, Solo	Nominated	
Billboard Latin Music Awards	2014	Marc Anthony	Tropical Albums Artist of the Year, Solo	Won	
Billboard Latin Music Awards	2014	"Vivir Mi Vida"	Hot Latin Song of the Year	Won	
Billboard Latin Music Awards	2014	"Vivir Mi Vida"	Airplay Song of the Year	Won	
Billboard Latin Music Awards	2014	"Vivir Mi Vida"	Digital Song of the Year	Won	
Billboard Latin Music Awards	2014	"Vivir Mi Vida"	Latin Pop Song of the Year	Won	
Billboard Latin Music Awards	2014	"Vivir Mi Vida"	Tropical Song of the Year	Won	
Billboard Latin Music Awards	2014	"Vivir Mi Vida"	Streaming Song of the Year	Nominated	
Billboard Latin Music Awards	2014	3.0	Top Latin Album of the Year	Won	
Billboard Latin Music Awards	2014	3.0	Tropical Album of the Year	Won	
Billboard Latin Music Awards	2015	Marc Anthony	Artist of the Year	Nominated	
Billboard Latin Music Awards	2015	Marc Anthony	Tour of the Year	Won	
Billboard Latin Music Awards	2015	Marc Anthony	Top Latin Albums Artist of the Year, Male	Nominated	
Billboard Latin Music Awards	2015	Marc Anthony	Tropical Songs Artist of the Year, Solo	Nominated	
Billboard Latin Music Awards	2015	Marc Anthony	Tropical Songs Artist of the Year, Solo	Nominated	
Billboard Latin Music Awards	2015	"Flor Pálida"	Tropical Song of the Year	Nominated	
Billboard Latin Music Awards	2015	"Yo También" (Romeo Santos featuring Marc Anthony)	Tropical Song of the Year	Nominated	
Billboard Latin Music Awards	2016	Marc Anthony	Tropical Albums Artist of the Year, Solo	Nominated	
Billboard Latin Music Awards	2016	Marc Anthony	Tropical Songs Artist of the Year, Solo	Nominated	
Billboard Latin Music Awards	2016	"La Gozadera" (Gente de Zona featuring Marc Anthony)	Hot Latin Song of the Year, Vocal Event	Nominated	
Billboard Latin Music Awards	2016	"La Gozadera" (Gente de Zona featuring Marc Anthony)	Digital Song of the Year	Nominated	
Billboard Latin Music Awards	2016	"La Gozadera" (Gente de Zona featuring Marc Anthony)	Tropical Song of the Year	Won	
Billboard Latin Music Awards	2016	"Yo También" (Romeo Santos featuring Marc Anthony)	Tropical Song of the Year	Nominated	
Billboard Latin Music Awards	2017	Marc Anthony	Tour of the Year	Won	
Billboard Latin Music Awards	2017	Marc Anthony	Tropical Songs Artist of the Year, Solo	Nominated	
Billboard Latin Music Awards	2017	Marc Anthony	Tropical Albums Artist of the Year, Solo	Won	
Billboard Latin Music Awards	2017	"Traidora" (Gente de Zona featuring Marc Anthony)	Tropical Song of the Year	Nominated	
Billboard Latin Music Awards	2018	Marc Anthony	Tour of the Year	Nominated	
Billboard Latin Music Awards	2018	Marc Anthony	Tropical Artist of the Year – Solo	Nominated	
Billboard Latin Music Awards	2019	Marc Anthony	Tropical Artist of the Year	Nominated	
Billboard Latin Music Awards	2020	Opus Tour	Tour of the Year	Nominated	
Billboard Latin Music Awards	2020	Marc Anthony	Tropical Artist of the Year	Nominated	
Billboard Latin Music Awards	2020	"Parecen Viernes"	Tropical Song of the Year	Nominated	
Billboard Latin Music Awards	2020	Opus	Tropical Album of the Year	Nominated	
Billboard Latin Music Awards	2021	"De Vuelta Pa' La Vuelta" (with Daddy Yankee)	Tropical Song of the Year	Nominated	
Billboard Latin Music Awards	2021	"Un Amor Eterno"	Tropical Song of the Year	Nominated	
Billboard Latin Music Awards	2021	Marc Anthony	Tropical Artist of the Year	Nominated	
Billboard Latin Music Awards	2022	Marc Anthony	Tour of the Year	Nominated	
Billboard Latin Music Awards	2022	Marc Anthony	Tropical Artist of the Year, Solo	Nominated	
Billboard Latin Music Awards	2022	"Mala"	Tropical Song of the Year	Nominated	
Billboard Latin Music Awards	2022	"Pa'llá Voy"	Tropical Song of the Year	Nominated	
Billboard Latin Music Awards	2022	Pa'llá Voy	Tropical Album of the Year	Won	
Billboard Latin Music Awards	2023	Marc Anthony	Tropical Artist of the Year, Solo	Nominated	
Billboard Latin Music Awards	2024	Marc Anthony	Tropical Artist of the Year, Solo	Nominated	
Billboard Latin Music Awards	2024	Muevense	Tropical Album of the Year	Nominated	
Billboard Latin Music Awards	2024	"Punta Cana"	Tropical Song of the Year	Nominated	
Billboard Music Awards	2011	Iconos	Top Latin Album	Nominated	
Billboard Music Awards	2014	Marc Anthony	Top Latin Artist	Won	
Billboard Music Awards	2014	"Vivir Mi Vida"	Top Latin Song	Won	
Billboard Music Awards	2014	3.0	Top Latin Album	Won	
Billboard Music Awards	2015	3.0	Top Latin Album	Nominated	
Blockbuster Entertainment Awards	2000	Marc Anthony, Marc Anthony	Favorite Male — New Artist	Nominated	
Blockbuster Entertainment Awards	2001	Marc Anthony, Desde un Principio: From the Beginning	Favorite Artist — Latino	Nominated	
Blockbuster Entertainment Awards	2001	Marc Anthony, Marc Anthony	Favorite Male Artist — Pop	Nominated	
Blockbuster Entertainment Awards	2001	"You Sang to Me"	Favorite Song From a Movie	Nominated	
BMI Latin Awards	1999	"Si Te Vas"	Most Performed Latin Songs	Won	
BMI Latin Awards	2001	"Da la Vuelta"	Latin Award-Winning Songs	Won	
BMI Latin Awards	2001	"Dímelo"	Latin Award-Winning Songs	Won	
BMI Latin Awards	2001	"Muy Dentro De Mí"	Latin Award-Winning Songs	Won	
BMI Latin Awards	2003	"Viviendo"	Song List	Won	
BMI Latin Awards	2005	"Ahora Quién"	Song List	Won	
BMI Latin Awards	2015	"Vivir Mi Vida"	Award Winning Songs	Won	
BMI Latin Awards	2016	"Cuando nos volvamos a encontrar" (Carlos Vives featuring Marc Anthony)	Award Winning Songs	Won	
Congressional Hispanic Caucus Institute	2009	Marc Anthony	Lifetime Excellence Award	Honoree	
Desi Entertainment Award	1995	"Vivir lo Nuestro" (with La India)	Tropical Song of the Year	Won	
Electronic Dance Music Awards	2017	"Felices Los 4" (Maluma featuring Marc Anthony)	Best Remix in Latin	Nominated	
Fashion Group International	2023	Marc Anthony	Humanitarian Award	Honoree	
Globo Awards (New York) (Note: transl. Globe Awards)	1999	"No Me Ames" (Jennifer Lopez featuring Marc Anthony)	Song of the Year	Nominated	
Grammy Awards	1996	Todo a su Tiempo	Best Tropical Latin Performance	Nominated	
Grammy Awards	1999	Contra la Corriente	Best Tropical Latin Performance	Won	
Grammy Awards	2000	"I Need to Know"	Best Male Pop Vocal Performance	Nominated	
Grammy Awards	2001	"You Sang to Me"	Best Male Pop Vocal Performance	Nominated	
Grammy Awards	2003	Libre	Best Salsa Album	Nominated	
Grammy Awards	2005	Amar Sin Mentiras	Best Latin Pop Album	Won	
Grammy Awards	2005	Valió la Pena	Best Salsa/Merengue Album	Nominated	
Grammy Awards	2014	3.0	Best Tropical Latin Album	Nominated	
Grammy Awards	2020	Opus	Best Tropical Latin Album	Won	
Grammy Awards	2023	Pa'llá Voy	Best Tropical Latin Album	Won	
Grammy Awards	2025	Muevense	Best Tropical Latin Album	Nominated	
Hasty Pudding Club	2019	Marc Anthony	Order of the Golden Sphinx	Honoree	
Heat Latin Music Awards	2015	Marc Anthony	Best Tropical Artist	Nominated	
Heat Latin Music Awards	2015	Marc Anthony	Best Male Artist	Nominated	
Heat Latin Music Awards	2015	Marc Anthony	Best Artist — North	Nominated	
Heat Latin Music Awards	2016	Marc Anthony	Best Tropical Artist	Nominated	
Heat Latin Music Awards	2016	"La Gozadera" (Gente de Zona featuring Marc Anthony)	Best Video	Nominated	
Heat Latin Music Awards	2017	Marc Anthony	Best Tropical Artist	Nominated	
Heat Latin Music Awards	2017	Marc Anthony	Best Male Singer	Nominated	
Heat Latin Music Awards	2017	"Deja Que Te Bese" (with Alejandro Fernandez)	Best Video	Nominated	
Heat Latin Music Awards	2019	"Felices Los 4" (Maluma featuring Marc Anthony)	Best Collaboration	Nominated	
Heat Latin Music Awards	2020	Marc Anthony	Best Tropical Artist	Nominated	
Heat Latin Music Awards	2021	Marc Anthony	Best Tropical Artist	Nominated	
Heat Latin Music Awards	2021	"De Vuelta Pa' La Vuelta" (with Daddy Yankee)	Best Collaboration	Nominated	
Heat Latin Music Awards	2022	Marc Anthony	Best Tropical Artist	Nominated	
Heat Latin Music Awards	2023	Marc Anthony	Best Tropical Artist	Nominated	
Heat Latin Music Awards	2023	"La Fórmula" (with Maluma)	Song of the Year	Nominated	
Hispanic Federation	2019	Marc Anthony	Premio Orgullo	Honoree	
Hollywood Walk of Fame	2023	Marc Anthony	Walk of Star	Inductee	
iHeartRadio Fiesta Latina	2018	Marc Anthony	Corazón Latino Award	Honoree	
Imagen Awards	2011	Marc Anthony (Hawthorne)	Best Supporting Actor/Television	Nominated	
International Dance Music Awards	2003	"Dance, Dance (The Mexican)" (Thalía featuring Marc Anthony)	Best Latin Dance Track	Won	
International Dance Music Awards	2012	"Rain Over Me" (Pitbull featuring Wisin & Yandel)	Best Latin/Reggaeton Track	Nominated	
International Dance Music Awards	2014	"Vivir Mi Vida"	Best Latin Dance Track	Nominated	
Latin American Music Awards	2015	"La Gozadera" (Gente de Zona featuring Marc Anthony)	Favorite Tropical Song	Won	
Latin American Music Awards	2016	"Traidora" (Gente de Zona featuring Marc Anthony)	Favorite Tropical Song	Nominated	
Latin American Music Awards	2017	"Olvídame y Pega la Vuelta" (with Jennifer Lopez)	Favorite Tropical Song	Nominated	
Latin American Music Awards	2019	Marc Anthony	Favorite Artist – Tropical	Nominated	
Latin American Music Awards	2019	Marc Anthony	International Artist Award of Excellence	Honoree	
Latin American Music Awards	2019	Marc Anthony	Favorite Tour	Nominated	
Latin American Music Awards	2019	Opus	Favorite Tropical Album	Nominated	
Latin American Music Awards	2019	"Adicto" (Prince Royce featuring Marc Anthony)	Favorite Tropical Song	Won	
Latin American Music Awards	2021	Marc Anthony	Favorite Tropical Artist	Nominated	
Latin American Music Awards	2022	Marc Anthony	Favorite Artist – Tropical	Nominated	
Latin American Music Awards	2022	Marc Anthony	Favorite Tour	Nominated	
Latin American Music Awards	2022	"Pa'lla Voy"	Favorite Tropical Song	Nominated	
Latin American Music Awards	2022	"De Vuelta Pa' La Vuelta" (with Daddy Yankee)	Favorite Tropical Song	Nominated	
Latin American Music Awards	2022	"De Vuelta Pa' La Vuelta" (with Daddy Yankee)	Collaboration of the Year	Nominated	
Latin American Music Awards	2023	Marc Anthony	Favorite Tropical Artist	Nominated	
Latin American Music Awards	2023	Pa'llá Voy	Favorite Tropical Album	Nominated	
Latin American Music Awards	2024	Marc Anthony	Favorite Tropical Artist	Nominated	
Latin American Music Awards	2024	"La Fórmula" (with Maluma)	Best Collaboration — Tropical	Nominated	
Latin Grammy Awards	2000	"Dímelo"	Record of the Year	Nominated	
Latin Grammy Awards	2000	"Dímelo"	Song of the Year	Won	
Latin Grammy Awards	2000	"Dímelo"	Best Male Pop Vocal Performance	Nominated	
Latin Grammy Awards	2000	"No Me Ames" (Jennifer Lopez featuring Marc Anthony)	Best Music Video	Nominated	
Latin Grammy Awards	2000	"No Me Ames" (Jennifer Lopez featuring Marc Anthony)	Best Pop Duo/Group Vocal	Nominated	
Latin Grammy Awards	2002	Libre	Best Salsa Album	Nominated	
Latin Grammy Awards	2005	Amar Sin Mentiras	Best Male Pop Vocal Album	Nominated	
Latin Grammy Awards	2005	Valió la Pena	Best Salsa Album	Won	
Latin Grammy Awards	2005	"Valió La Pena"	Best Tropical Song	Nominated	
Latin Grammy Awards	2008	El Cantante	Best Salsa Album	Won	
Latin Grammy Awards	2010	Iconos	Best Male Pop Vocal Album	Nominated	
Latin Grammy Awards	2013	"Vivir Mi Vida"	Record of the Year	Won	
Latin Grammy Awards	2014	3.0	Album of the Year	Nominated	
Latin Grammy Awards	2014	3.0	Best Salsa Album	Won	
Latin Grammy Awards	2014	"Cambio de Piel"	Record of the Year	Nominated	
Latin Grammy Awards	2014	"Cuando nos volvamos a encontrar" (Carlos Vives featuring Marc Anthony)	Record of the Year	Nominated	
Latin Grammy Awards	2017	Marc Anthony for Babies	Best Latin Children's Album	Won	
Latin Grammy Awards	2017	"Dejé de Amar" (Felipe Muñiz featuring Marc Anthony)	Best Tropical Song	Nominated	
Latin Grammy Awards	2019	"Parecen Viernes"	Record of the Year	Nominated	
Latin Grammy Awards	2021	"Un Amor Eterno (Versión Balada)"	Record of the Year	Nominated	
Latin Grammy Awards	2021	"Un Amor Eterno"	Best Short Form Music Video	Won	
Latin Grammy Awards	2022	Pa'llá Voy	Best Salsa Album	Won	
Latin Grammy Awards	2022	Pa'llá Voy	Album of the Year	Nominated	
Latin Grammy Awards	2022	Pa'llá Voy	Record of the Year	Nominated	
Latin Grammy Awards	2022	"Mala"	Best Tropical Song	Won	
Latin Grammy Awards	2023	"La Fórmula" (with Maluma)	Best Tropical Song	Nominated	
Latin Grammy Awards	2023	"La Fórmula" (with Maluma)	Record of the Year	Nominated	
Latin Recording Academy	2016	Marc Anthony	Person of the Year	Honoree	
Lo Nuestro Awards	1994	Marc Anthony	Tropical/Salsa New Artist of the Year	Won	
Lo Nuestro Awards	1994	Marc Anthony	Male Artist of the Year, Tropical/Salsa	Nominated	
Lo Nuestro Awards	1994	"Hasta Que Te Conocí"	Tropical Song of the Year	Nominated	
Lo Nuestro Awards	1995	"Vivir lo Nuestro" (with La India)	Tropical/Salsa Song of the Year	Nominated	
Lo Nuestro Awards	1996	Marc Anthony	Male Artist of the Year, Tropical/Salsa	Won	
Lo Nuestro Awards	1996	Todo a su Tiempo	Tropical/Salsa Album of the Year	Nominated	
Lo Nuestro Awards	1996	"Te Conozco Bien"	Tropical/Salsa Song of the Year	Nominated	
Lo Nuestro Awards	1997	Marc Anthony	Male Artist of the Year, Tropical/Salsa	Won	
Lo Nuestro Awards	1997	Todo a su Tiempo	Tropical/Salsa Album of the Year	Won	
Lo Nuestro Awards	1997	"Llegaste a Mi"	Tropical/Salsa Song of the Year	Nominated	
Lo Nuestro Awards	1997	"Hasta Ayer"	Tropical/Salsa Song of the Year	Nominated	
Lo Nuestro Awards	1998	"Y Hubo Alguien"	Tropical/Salsa Song of the Year	Won	
Lo Nuestro Awards	1998	"Y Hubo Alguien"	Video of the Year	Nominated	
Lo Nuestro Awards	1998	Marc Anthony	Male Artist of the Year, Tropical/Salsa	Nominated	
Lo Nuestro Awards	1998	Contra la Corriente	Tropical/Salsa Album of the Year	Nominated	
Lo Nuestro Awards	1999	Marc Anthony	Male Artist of the Year, Tropical/Salsa	Nominated	
Lo Nuestro Awards	1999	"Contra la Corriente"	Tropical/Salsa Song of the Year	Nominated	
Lo Nuestro Awards	2000	Marc Anthony	Pop Male Artist	Nominated	
Lo Nuestro Awards	2000	Marc Anthony	Male Artist of the Year, Tropical/Salsa	Nominated	
Lo Nuestro Awards	2000	Marc Anthony and Jennifer Lopez	Pop Duo or Group of the Year	Nominated	
Lo Nuestro Awards	2000	"Dímelo"	Pop Song of the Year	Nominated	
Lo Nuestro Awards	2000	"No Sabes Como Duele"	Tropical/Salsa Song of the Year	Nominated	
Lo Nuestro Awards	2001	Marc Anthony	Pop Male Artist	Won	
Lo Nuestro Awards	2001	Marc Anthony	Tropical Male Artist of the Year	Won	
Lo Nuestro Awards	2001	Marc Anthony	Salsa Artist of the Year	Nominated	
Lo Nuestro Awards	2001	"Da la Vuelta"	Tropical Song	Nominated	
Lo Nuestro Awards	2001	"Muy Dentro de Mí"	Pop Song of the Year	Nominated	
Lo Nuestro Awards	2003	Marc Anthony	Tropical Male Artist	Won	
Lo Nuestro Awards	2003	Marc Anthony	Salsa Artist of the Year	Nominated	
Lo Nuestro Awards	2003	Marc Anthony	Best Salsa Performance	Nominated	
Lo Nuestro Awards	2003	Marc Anthony	Popular Tropical Artist	Won	
Lo Nuestro Awards	2003	"Viviendo"	Tropical Song	Nominated	
Lo Nuestro Awards	2003	"Viviendo"	Song of the Year	Nominated	
Lo Nuestro Awards	2003	Libre	Tropical Album of the Year	Nominated	
Lo Nuestro Awards	2004	Marc Anthony	Male Artist of the Year, Tropical/Salsa	Won	
Lo Nuestro Awards	2004	Marc Anthony	Best Salsa Performance	Won	
Lo Nuestro Awards	2004	"Barco a La Deriva"	Tropical Song of the Year	Won	
Lo Nuestro Awards	2005	Marc Anthony	Male Artist of the Year, Tropical/Salsa	Won	
Lo Nuestro Awards	2005	Marc Anthony	Tropical Salsa Artist of the Year	Won	
Lo Nuestro Awards	2005	Valió la Pena	Tropical Album of the Year	Won	
Lo Nuestro Awards	2005	"Ahora quién"	Tropical Song of the Year	Won	
Lo Nuestro Awards	2005	"Ahora quién"	Video of the Year	Nominated	
Lo Nuestro Awards	2006	Marc Anthony	Salsa Artist of the Year	Won	
Lo Nuestro Awards	2006	Marc Anthony	Male Artist of the Year, Tropical/Salsa	Won	
Lo Nuestro Awards	2006	"Se Esfuma Tu Amor"	Tropical Song of the Year	Nominated	
Lo Nuestro Awards	2007	Marc Anthony	Tropical Male Artist	Won	
Lo Nuestro Awards	2007	Marc Anthony	Tropical Salsa Artist of the Year	Nominated	
Lo Nuestro Awards	2007	Sigo Siendo Yo: Grandes Éxitos	Tropical Album of the Year	Nominated	
Lo Nuestro Awards	2007	"Tu Amor Me Hace Bien"	Tropical Song of the Year	Nominated	
Lo Nuestro Awards	2008	Marc Anthony	Male Artist of the Year, Tropical/Salsa	Nominated	
Lo Nuestro Awards	2008	Marc Anthony	Tropical Salsa Artist of the Year	Won	
Lo Nuestro Awards	2009	Marc Anthony	Male Artist of the Year, Tropical/Salsa	Nominated	
Lo Nuestro Awards	2009	Marc Anthony	Tropical Salsa Artist of the Year	Nominated	
Lo Nuestro Awards	2010	"Recuérdame" (La 5ª Estación featuring Marc Anthony)	Video of the Year	Nominated	
Lo Nuestro Awards	2014	Marc Anthony	Salsa Artist of the Year	Won	
Lo Nuestro Awards	2014	Marc Anthony	Excellence Award	Honoree	
Lo Nuestro Awards	2014	"Por qué les mientes" (Tito el Bambino featuring Marc Anthony)	Collaboration of the Year	Won	
Lo Nuestro Awards	2014	"Por qué les mientes" (Tito el Bambino featuring Marc Anthony)	Tropical Song of the Year	Nominated	
Lo Nuestro Awards	2014	"Vivir Mi Vida"	Tropical Song of the Year	Won	
Lo Nuestro Awards	2014	3.0	Tropical Album of the Year	Won	
Lo Nuestro Awards	2015	Marc Anthony	Tropical Male Artist	Nominated	
Lo Nuestro Awards	2015	Marc Anthony	Salsa Artist of the Year	Won	
Lo Nuestro Awards	2015	"Se Fue" (Laura Pausini featuring Marc Anthony)	Collaboration of the Year	Nominated	
Lo Nuestro Awards	2015	"Cuando nos volvamos a encontrar" (Carlos Vives featuring Marc Anthony)	Collaboration of the Year	Nominated	
Lo Nuestro Awards	2015	"Cuando nos volvamos a encontrar" (Carlos Vives featuring Marc Anthony)	Video of the Year	Nominated	
Lo Nuestro Awards	2016	Marc Anthony	Tropical Male Artist	Won	
Lo Nuestro Awards	2016	Marc Anthony	Tropical Artist of the Year	Won	
Lo Nuestro Awards	2016	"La Gozadera" (Gente de Zona featuring Marc Anthony)	Video of the Year	Nominated	
Lo Nuestro Awards	2016	"Yo También" (Romeo Santos featuring Marc Anthony)	Collaboration of the Year	Nominated	
Lo Nuestro Awards	2016	"Yo También" (Romeo Santos featuring Marc Anthony)	Tropical Song	Nominated	
Lo Nuestro Awards	2017	"La Gozadera" (Gente de Zona featuring Marc Anthony)	Collaboration of the Year	Nominated	
Lo Nuestro Awards	2017	"La Gozadera" (Gente de Zona featuring Marc Anthony)	Tropical Song	Nominated	
Lo Nuestro Awards	2019	"Está Rico" (Bad Bunny and Will Smith)	Crossover Collaboration of the Year	Nominated	
Lo Nuestro Awards	2019	Legacy Tour	Tour of the Year	Nominated	
Lo Nuestro Awards	2020	Marc Anthony	Tropical Artist of the Year	Nominated	
Lo Nuestro Awards	2020	"Parecen Viernes"	Tropical Song of the Year	Nominated	
Lo Nuestro Awards	2020	"Parecen Viernes"	Song of the Year	Nominated	
Lo Nuestro Awards	2020	Opus	Album of the Year	Nominated	
Lo Nuestro Awards	2021	Marc Anthony	Tropical Artist of the Year	Nominated	
Lo Nuestro Awards	2021	"Lo Que Te Di"	Tropical Song of the Year	Nominated	
Lo Nuestro Awards	2022	"De Vuelta Pa' La Vuelta" (with Daddy Yankee)	Song of the Year	Nominated	
Lo Nuestro Awards	2022	"De Vuelta Pa' La Vuelta" (with Daddy Yankee)	Perfect Mix of The Year	Nominated	
Lo Nuestro Awards	2022	"De Vuelta Pa' La Vuelta" (with Daddy Yankee)	Tropical Collaboration of the Year	Nominated	
Lo Nuestro Awards	2022	"De Vuelta Pa' La Vuelta" (with Daddy Yankee)	Tropical Song of the Year	Nominated	
Lo Nuestro Awards	2022	"Un Amor Eterno"	Tropical Song of the Year	Nominated	
Lo Nuestro Awards	2022	Marc Anthony	Tropical Artist of the Year	Nominated	
Lo Nuestro Awards	2023	Pa'llá Voy	Tropical Album of the Year	Won	
Lo Nuestro Awards	2023	Pa'llá Voy	Album of the Year	Nominated	
Lo Nuestro Awards	2023	Marc Anthony	Tropical Artist of the Year	Nominated	
Lo Nuestro Awards	2023	"Mala"	Tropical Song of the Year	Nominated	
Lo Nuestro Awards	2024	Marc Anthony	Tropical Artist of the Year	Nominated	
Lo Nuestro Awards	2024	"La Fórmula" (with Maluma)	Tropical Collaboration of the Year	Nominated	
Lo Nuestro Awards	2024	"Yo Le Mentí"	Tropical Song of the Year	Nominated	
Lo Nuestro Awards	2025	Muevense	Album of the Year	Nominated	
Lo Nuestro Awards	2025	Muevense	Tropical Album of the Year	Nominated	
Lo Nuestro Awards	2025	Marc Anthony	Tropical Artist of the Year	Nominated	
Lo Nuestro Awards	2025	"Ale Ale"	Tropical Song of the Year	Nominated	
Lunas del Auditorio	2011	Marc Anthony	Afro-American Act	Nominated	
Lunas del Auditorio	2015	Marc Anthony	Afro-American Act	Nominated	
Lunas del Auditorio	2016	Marc Anthony	Afro-American Act	Nominated	
Lunas del Auditorio	2019	Marc Anthony	Afro-American Act	Nominated	
Miami Life Awards	2007	Marc Anthony/Chayanne/Alejandro Fernández	Concert of the Year	Nominated	
Miami Life Awards	2007	Juntos en Concierto (Laura Pausini/Marco Antonio Solís/Marc Anthony/)	Concert of the Year	Nominated	
Monitor Latino Awards (Note: Also known as Deezer Monitor Music Awards.)	2010	"Recuérdame" (La 5ª Estación featuring Marc Anthony)	Special Pop Collaboration	Nominated	
Monitor Latino Awards	2021	"De Vuelta Pa' La Vuelta" (with Daddy Yankee)	Best Tropical Song	Won	
Monitor Latino Awards	2021	"Las Puertas del Cielo" (with Manny Cruz)	Best Bachata Song	Nominated	
Orgullosamente Latino Award	2006	Marc Anthony	Male Latin Soloist of the Year	Nominated	
People en Español Awards	2010	Marc Anthony	Comeback of the Year	Nominated	
People en Español Awards	2010	"¿Y cómo es él?"	Cover of the Year	Nominated	
People en Español Awards	2011	Marc Anthony	Best Tropical Solo Artist or Group	Won	
People en Español Awards	2011	Marc Anthony and Jennifer Lopez	Separation of the Year	Won	
People en Español Awards	2012	Marc Anthony	King of Facebook	Nominated	
People en Español Awards	2013	Marc Anthony	Best Male Singer	Nominated	
People en Español Awards	2013	3.0	Album of the Year	Nominated	
People en Español Awards	2013	"Vivir Mi Vida"	Best Music Video	Nominated	
People en Español Awards	2013	"Vivir Mi Vida"	Song of the Year	Nominated	
People en Español Awards	2013	"Por qué les mientes" (Tito el Bambino featuring Marc Anthony)	Best Collaboration of the Year	Nominated	
Pollstar Awards	2021	Marc Anthony	Latin Touring Artist of the Decade	Nominated	
Pollstar Awards	2022	Pa'llá Voy Tour	Best Latin Tour	Nominated	
Premio Diplo (Puerto Rico)	1994	Marc Anthony	Revelation of the Year	Won	
Premios Juventud	2004	Marc Anthony	He's Got Style	Nominated	
Premios Juventud	2004	Marc Anthony	What a Hottie!	Nominated	
Premios Juventud	2004	Marc Anthony	Can He Act or What?	Nominated	
Premios Juventud	2004	Marc Anthony	My Idol Is	Nominated	
Premios Juventud	2004	Marc Anthony	Can He Act or What?	Nominated	
Premios Juventud	2004	Marc Anthony	Paparazzi's Favorite Target	Nominated	
Premios Juventud	2004	Marc Anthony	Voice of the Moment	Nominated	
Premios Juventud	2004	Jennifer Lopez and Marc Anthony	Paparazzi's Favorite Target	Won	
Premios Juventud	2004	Jennifer Lopez and Marc Anthony	Hottest Romance	Nominated	
Premios Juventud	2004	Jennifer Lopez and Marc Anthony	Dynamic Duet	Nominated	
Premios Juventud	2004	La India and Marc Anthony	Dynamic Duet	Nominated	
Premios Juventud	2004	Amar Sin Mentiras	CD To Die For	Nominated	
Premios Juventud	2004	"Ahora quién"	Catchiest Tune	Nominated	
Premios Juventud	2004	"No Me Ames" (Jennifer Lopez featuring Marc Anthony)	Catchiest Tune	Nominated	
Premios Juventud	2005	Marc Anthony	Favorite Tropical Artist	Nominated	
Premios Juventud	2005	Marc Anthony and Jennifer Lopez	Hottest Romance	Nominated	
Premios Juventud	2005	"Escapémonos" (with Jennifer Lopez)	Dynamic Duet	Nominated	
Premios Juventud	2006	Marc Anthony	Favorite Tropical Artist	Nominated	
Premios Juventud	2007	Marc Anthony	Favorite Tropical Artist	Nominated	
Premios Juventud	2008	Marc Anthony	Favorite Tropical Artist	Nominated	
Premios Juventud	2008	Marc Anthony and Jennifer Lopez	Hottest Romance	Nominated	
Premios Juventud	2008	Marc Anthony and Jennifer Lopez	Paparazzi's Favorite Target	Won	
Premios Juventud	2009	Marc Anthony	Favorite Tropical Artist	Nominated	
Premios Juventud	2010	"Recuérdame" (La 5ª Estación featuring Marc Anthony)	The Perfect Combination	Nominated	
Premios Juventud	2011	Marc Anthony	Favorite Tropical Artist	Nominated	
Premios Juventud	2012	Marc Anthony	Favorite Tropical Artist	Nominated	
Premios Juventud	2012	"La Fuerza del Destino" (with Sandra Echeverría)	Best Theme Novelero	Nominated	
Premios Juventud	2013	"¿Por Qué Les Mientes?"	The Perfect Combination	Nominated	
Premios Juventud	2014	Vivir Mi Vida World Tour	El Súper Tour	Won	
Premios Juventud	2014	"Vivir Mi Vida"	My Ringtone	Won	
Premios Juventud	2015	Marc Anthony	Favorite Tropical Artist	Nominated	
Premios Juventud	2015	"Yo También" (Romeo Santos featuring Marc Anthony)	The Perfect Combination	Nominated	
Premios Juventud	2015	"Yo También" (Romeo Santos featuring Marc Anthony)	Favorite Video	Nominated	
Premios Juventud	2015	Cambio De Piel Tour	El Súper Tour	Nominated	
Premios Juventud	2016	"La Gozadera" (Gente de Zona featuring Marc Anthony)	The Perfect Combination	Won	
Premios Juventud	2016	Marc Anthony	Favorite Tropical Artist	Won	
Premios Juventud	2017	"Deja Que Te Bese" (with Alejandro Fernandez)	Best Song For Love	Nominated	
Premios Juventud	2019	Marc Anthony	This Is a BTS (Best Behind the Scenes)	Nominated	
Premios Juventud	2021	"De Vuelta Pa' La Vuelta" (with Daddy Yankee)	Viral Track of the Year	Nominated	
Premios Juventud	2021	"De Vuelta Pa' La Vuelta" (with Daddy Yankee)	Tropical Mix	Nominated	
Premios Juventud	2021	"De Vuelta Pa' La Vuelta" (with Daddy Yankee)	Song of the Year	Nominated	
Premios Juventud	2021	"De Vuelta Pa' La Vuelta" (with Daddy Yankee)	Catchiest Song	Nominated	
Premios Juventud	2022	"Pa'llá Voy"	Catchiest Song	Nominated	
Premios Juventud	2022	"Pa'llá Voy"	Best Tropical Hit	Nominated	
Premios Juventud	2023	"La Fórmula" (with Maluma)	Best Tropical Hit	Nominated	
Premios Juventud	2023	"La Fórmula" (with Maluma)	Best Tropical Mix	Nominated	
Premios Juventud	2023	Pa'llá Voy	Best Tropical Album	Nominated	
Premios Juventud	2024	"Punta Cana"	Tropical Hit	Nominated	
Premios Radio y Televisión	2001	Marc Anthony	Gold Award	Nominated	
Premios TVyNovelas	2012	"La Fuerza del Destino" (with Sandra Echeverría)	Best Musical Theme	Nominated	
Quiero Awards (Argentina)	2014	"Se Fue" (Laura Pausini featuring Marc Anthony)	Female Video of the Year	Nominated	
Quiero Awards (Argentina)	2014	"Cuando nos volvamos a encontrar" (Carlos Vives featuring Marc Anthony)	Best Video to Fall in Love	Nominated	
Quiero Awards (Argentina)	2016	"Deja Que Te Bese" (with Alejandro Fernandez)	Best Male Video	Nominated	
Recording Academy	2002	Marc Anthony	New York Heroes Awards	Honoree	
Ritmo Latino Awards (Note: Also known as "Premio de la Gente" or Latin Music Fan Awards.)	1999	Marc Anthony	Salsa Artist of the Year	Won	
Ritmo Latino Awards	1999	"No Me Ames" (Jennifer Lopez featuring Marc Anthony)	Video of the Year	Nominated	
Ritmo Latino Awards	2002	Marc Anthony	Tropical Solo Artist or Group of the Year	Nominated	
Ritmo Latino Awards	2002	"Hasta Que Vuelvas Conmigo"	Song of the Year	Nominated	
Ritmo Latino Awards	2002	Libre	Album of the Year	Nominated	
Soberano Awards (a.k.a. Casandra Awards)	2016	"Yo También" (Romeo Santos featuring Marc Anthony)	Show of the Year	Nominated	
Soberano Awards (a.k.a. Casandra Awards)	2016	"Yo También" (Romeo Santos featuring Marc Anthony)	Video of the Year	Nominated	
Soberano Awards (a.k.a. Casandra Awards)	2016	"Yo También" (Romeo Santos featuring Marc Anthony)	Collaboration of the Year	Won	
SoundExchange	2023	Marc Anthony	Hall of Fame	Inductee	
Tú Música Awards (Puerto Rico)	1995	Marc Anthony		Nominated	
Tú Música Awards (Puerto Rico)	1996	Todo a su Tiempo	Best Tropical Album	Won	
Tú Música Awards (Puerto Rico)	1998	"Y Hubo Alguien"	Tropical Song of the Year	Won	
Tu Música Urbano Awards	2023	"La Fórmula" (with Maluma)	Top Song — Tropical Urban	Nominated	
Viña del Mar International Song Festival	2009	Marc Anthony	Gaviota de Plata (Silver Seagull)	Silver	
Viña del Mar International Song Festival	2009	Marc Anthony	Gaviota de Oro (Gold Seagull)	Gold	
Viña del Mar International Song Festival	2009	Marc Anthony	Antorcha de Plata (Silver Torch)	Silver	
Viña del Mar International Song Festival	2009	Marc Anthony	Antorcha de Oro (Gold Torch)	Gold	
Viña del Mar International Song Festival	2012	Marc Anthony	Gaviota de Plata	Silver	
Viña del Mar International Song Festival	2012	Marc Anthony	Gaviota de Oro	Gold	
Viña del Mar International Song Festival	2012	Marc Anthony	Antorcha de Plata	Silver	
Viña del Mar International Song Festival	2012	Marc Anthony	Antorcha de Oro	Gold	
Viña del Mar International Song Festival	2015	Marc Anthony	Gaviota de Plata	Silver	
Viña del Mar International Song Festival	2015	Marc Anthony	Gaviota de Oro	Nominated	
Viña del Mar International Song Festival	2015	Marc Anthony	Antorcha de Plata	Silver	
Viña del Mar International Song Festival	2015	Marc Anthony	Antorcha de Oro	Gold	
Viña del Mar International Song Festival	2019	Marc Anthony	Gaviota de Plata	Silver	
Viña del Mar International Song Festival	2019	Marc Anthony	Gaviota de Oro	Gold	
VIVA Comet Awards	2000	Marc Anthony	Best Latin Act	Nominated	
World Music Awards	2013	Marc Anthony	World's Best Male Singer	Nominated	
World Music Awards	2013	"Vivir Mi Vida"	World's Best Song	Nominated	
Your World Awards (Premios Tú Mundo)	2013	"Por qué les mientes" (Tito el Bambino featuring Marc Anthony)	Party Starter Song	Nominated	
Your World Awards (Premios Tú Mundo)	2014	Marc Anthony	Favorite Tropical Artist	Nominated	
Your World Awards (Premios Tú Mundo)	2015	Marc Anthony	Favorite Tropical Artist	Nominated	
Z Awards	2011	Marc Anthony and Jennifer Lopez	Biggest Celeb Breakup	Won	

== Other honors ==
Name of country, year given, and name of honor
Country	Year	Honor	Result	Ref.
Italy	2008	Special award for services to music granted by Councilor of Milan, Giovanni Terzi	Honoree	
United States	2016	Keys to the city of Bridgeport, Connecticut by Mayor Joe Ganim	Honoree	
United States	2017	Keys to the city of Miami	Honoree	
United States	2021	Keys to the city of Orlando	Honoree	
