= Desde un Principio: From the Beginning =

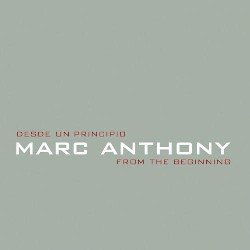

Greatest hits album by Marc Anthony
- Released: November 9, 1999
- Recorded: 1993–1999
- Genre: Salsa
- Length: 73:52
- Language: Spanish
- Label: RMM

Marc Anthony chronology
Marc Anthony (1999)	Desde un Principio: From the Beginning (1999)	Libre (2001)

Desde un Principio: From the Beginning is a greatest hits album from American recording artist Marc Anthony. The album was released on November 9, 1999, by RMM Records & Video (RMM). It was a result of Anthony leaving RMM Records and signing on with Columbia Records. The recording contains fourteen tracks from his years with RMM and "No Me Ames" by Jennifer Lopez and Anthony.

Allmusic's Jose Promis praised Desde un Principio: From the Beginning, calling the album an "ideal introduction" to the artist, although he complained about the songs on it being "truncated", particularly towards the end. The album received a Billboard Latin Music Award for Latin Greatest Hits Album of the Year. Desde un Principio: From the Beginning reached number one on both the Billboard Top Latin Albums and the Billboard Tropical Albums charts, and became the best-selling album of 2000 on both charts. The album was certified gold by the Recording Industry Association of America (RIAA) after shipments reached 500,000 copies.

== Background ==
After the release of Contra la Corriente in 1997, disputes over certain business practices arose between Marc Anthony and RMM executive Ralph Mercado. Columbia Records had approached Anthony to sign a contract with their record label. However, Mercado would not allow Anthony to leave RMM Records because of an earlier contract committing Anthony to record two more albums for RMM. Anthony filed a lawsuit, and with the backing of Columbia Records, bought out the remainder of the contract. As part of the settlement, Anthony allowed RMM Records to release a "greatest hits" collection from his earlier records.

== Content ==
Desde un Principio: From the Beginning includes a total of fifteen songs, most of which came from his recordings with RMM. Four songs were selected from each of his earlier albums (Otra Nota, Todo a Su Tiempo, and Contra la Corriente). The opener, a tropical version of "No Me Ames", is a duet with American singer and actress Jennifer Lopez; she included the recording on her debut album On the 6 (1999). "Vivir lo Nuestro", featuring La India, was originally recorded on the RMM Records compilation album Combinacion Perfecta. "Preciosa" is a cover of the Rafael Hernández song which Anthony had recorded for a tribute album to Hernandez, Romance Del Cumbanchero – La Musica del Rafael Hernández.

== Commercial reception ==
The album debuted at number three on the Billboard Top Latin Albums on the week of November 27, 1999, and reached number one the following week. The recording debuted atop the Billboard Tropical Albums chart on the week of November 27, 1999, and remained at number one for five consecutive months. Desde un Principio: From the Beginning peaked at number 151 on the Billboard 200 chart and became the best-selling album of 2000 for the Top Latin Albums and Tropical Albums charts. It was then certified gold by the Recording Industry Association of America (RIAA).

== Critical reception ==
Professional ratings
Review scores
Source	Rating
Allmusic	4.5/5 stars

Jose Promis of Allmusic gave the album 4.5 out of 5 stars. He described it as a "superb collection", and wrote that Desde un Principio "provides a wonderful introduction to the music of Marc Anthony, a singer that, undoubtedly, will one day rank among the best." Promis also complained that the songs were "severely truncated", especially near their end.

In 2001, Anthony received a Billboard Latin Music Award for "Latin Greatest Hits Albums of the Year".

== Track listing ==
- The following track information is from Allmusic.

No.	Title	Writer(s)	Length
1.	"No Me Ames (Tropical Remix)" (with Jennifer Lopez, from On the 6, 1999)	Giancarlo Bigazzi; Marco Falagiani; Ignacio Ballesteros; Alejandro Baldi	5:04
2.	"Si Tú No Te Fueras" (from Otra Nota, 1993)	Nelson Frank; Jaime Gutierrez	4:31
3.	"Necesito Amarte" (from Otra Nota, 1993)	Luis Castillo	4:38
4.	"Hasta Que Te Conocí" (from Otra Nota, 1993)	Juan Gabriel	4:52
5.	"El Último Beso" (from Otra Nota, 1993)	Felipe Muñíz	4:23
6.	"Te Conozco Bien" (from Todo a Su Tiempo, 1995)	Omar Alfanno	5:01
7.	"Nadie Como Ella" (from Todo a Su Tiempo, 1995)	Alfanno	4:44
8.	"Te Amaré" (from Todo a Su Tiempo, 1995)	Angel Ramirez Jr.	4:35
9.	"Hasta Ayer" (from Todo a Su Tiempo, 1995)	Manny Delgado	3:57
10.	"Y Hubo Alguien" (from Contra la Corriente, 1997)	Alfanno	6:10
11.	"Contra la Corriente" (from Contra la Corriente, 1997)	Alfanno	4:56
12.	"No Me Conoces" (from Contra la Corriente, 1997)	Fernando Arias	4:52
13.	"No Sabes Cómo Duele" (from Contra la Corriente, 1997)	Alfanno	4:51
14.	"Preciosa" (from Romance Del Cumbanchero – La Musica del Rafael Hernández, 1998)	Rafael Hernández	5:12
15.	"Vivir lo Nuestro" (with La India, from Combinación Perfecta, 1993)	Normandia González; Rudy Pérez	6:06

== Chart performance ==
Chart (1999/2000)	Peak position
U.S. Billboard 200	151
U.S. Billboard Top Latin Albums	1
U.S. Billboard Tropical Albums	1

=== Year-end charts ===
Chart (2000)	Peak position
U.S. Billboard Top Latin Albums	1
U.S. Billboard Tropical Albums	1

Chart (2001)	Peak position
U.S. Billboard Top Latin Albums	20
U.S. Billboard Tropical Albums	3

== Album certification ==
Region	Certification	Certified units/sales
Spain (PROMUSICAE)	Gold	50,000^{^}
United States (RIAA)	Gold	500,000^{^}
^{^} Shipments figures based on certification alone.

== See also ==
- List of number-one Billboard Top Latin Albums of 2000
- List of number-one Billboard Tropical Albums from the 1990s
- List of number-one Billboard Tropical Albums from the 2000s
