= Tropical Tribute to the Beatles =

Compilation album by various artists
- Released: April 1996
- Genre: Salsa music, Tropical music
- Length: 62:03
- Label: RMM Records
- Producer: Oscar Gomez

Professional ratings
Review scores
Source	Rating
Allmusic	4.5/5 stars
Los Angeles Times	3/4 stars

Tropical Tribute to the Beatles is a tribute album of tropical artists released in 1996 by RMM Records (Ralph Mercado's record company), produced by Oscar Gomez (distributed by Bellaphon & Uni Distribution).

Arrangements were made by Steve Roistein, and lyrics were adapted into Spanish by Jorge Córcega, who had previously adapted the lyrics of Salvatore Adamo.

The concert in New York City at Radio City Music Hall was released on DVD. In 1996 a tour was made through Spain (Plaza de Toros (Valencia), Madrid, A Coruña's Coliseum, Barcelona).

== Tracks ==
1. "Hey Jude" – Tony Vega 5:28
2. "Let It Be" – Tito Nieves & Tito Puente 5:17
3. "Can't Buy Me Love (No Puedes Comprarme)" – Guianko 4:37
4. "A Hard Day's Night" – Johnny Rivera 4:59
5. "Ob-La-Di, Ob-La-Da" (adaptado en español) – Celia Cruz 4:42
6. "The Fool On the Hill" – Ray Sepúlveda 4:28
7. "I Want to Hold Your Hand" – Manny Manuel (merengue) 4:25
8. "Day Tripper" – Domingo Quiñones 4:15
9. "Lady Madonna" (adaptado en español) – Oscar D'León 4:46
10. "With a Little Help from My Friends (La Ayuda De La Amistad)" – Jesus Enriquez & Miles Peña 5:05
11. "Yesterday" – Cheo Feliciano 4:51
12. "And I Love Her (Un Gran Amor Le Di)" – José Alberto "El Canario" (bachata) 3:15
13. "Come Together (Venir Juntos)" – All singers 5:55

== DVD « Live » from Radio City Music Hall ==
1. Isidro Infante y la Orquesta RMM – "Eleanor Rigby" / "Magical Mystery Tour"
2. Miles Peña / Jorge Enriquez – "With a Little Help from My Friends (La Ayuda De La Amistad)"
3. Frankie Morales – "A Hard Day's Night"
4. David Navedo – "Day Tripper"
5. Guianko – "Can't Buy Me Love (No Puedes Comprarme)"
6. Ray Sepúlveda – "The Fool On the Hill"
7. Tito Puente / Tito Nieves – "Let It Be"
8. José Alberto "El Canario" – "And I Love Her"
9. Ravel – "I Want to Hold Your Hand (Tu Mano Cogeré)"
10. Oscar D'León – "Lady Madonna"
11. Tony Vega – "Hey Jude"
12. Cheo Feliciano – "Yesterday"
13. Celia Cruz – "Ob-La-Di, Ob-La-Da"

== Musicians ==
- Steve Roistein – piano, synth
- Ed Calle – saxophone
- Tony Conception – trumpet
- Dana Teboe – trombone
- Beledo – guitar
- Chema Moncillo – bass
- Sammy Timbalon Pagan, Oscar Gomez: percussions
- Cheito Quiñones, Steve Roistein, Oscar Gomez, Rosa Giron, Jose Morato, Juan Canovas: chorus

In the merengue ”I Want to Hold Your Hand (Tu Mano Cogere)”:

- Rafael Rojas – congas
- Yuni Brito – tambora

== Chart position ==
Album

Year	Chart	Album	Peak
1996	Billboard Tropical/Salsa	Tropical Tribute to the Beatles	3
1996	Billboard Top Latin Albums	Tropical Tribute to the Beatles	25

Singles

Year	Chart	Single	Peak
1996	Billboard Hot Latin Tracks	Come Together (Venir Juntos)	38
1996	Billboard Hot Latin Tracks	I Want To Hold Your Hand	13
1996	Billboard Latin Pop Airplay	I Want To Hold Your Hand	8

== See also ==
- List of artists who have covered The Beatles
