= Te Conozco Bien =

1995 single by Marc Anthony

Single by Marc Anthony

from the album Todo a Su Tiempo
- Language: Spanish
- Released: May 30, 1995
- Studio: Quad Recording, New York City, NY
- Genre: Salsa
- Length: 5:16
- Label: RMM
- Songwriter: Omar Alfanno
- Producers: Marc Anthony; Sergio George

Marc Anthony singles chronology
"Vivir lo Nuestro" (1994)	"Te Conozco Bien" (1995)	"Se Me Sigue Olvidando" (1995)

"Te Conozco Bien" (English: "I Know You Well") is a song by American singer Marc Anthony from his second studio album, Todo a Su Tiempo (1995). The song was written by Omar Alfanno, with production being handled by Marc Anthony and Sergio George. It was released as the first promotional single from the album on May 30, 1995. A salsa song, it sees the singer express certainty that someone is regretful. The song was awarded the Billboard Latin Music Award in 1996 for "Hot Latin Track of the Year" in the Tropical/Salsa field and was nominated for the Tropical Song of the Year award at the 8th Annual Lo Nuestro Awards in the same year. It was a recipient of the ASCAP Latin Award in 1996. Commercially, the song peaked at number seven on the Hot Latin Songs chart and number one on the Tropical Airplay chart in the United States. It was the best-performing song of 1995 on the latter chart. The song was covered by Puerto Rican singer Ángel López as a ballad on his studio album Historias de Amor (2010).

== Background and composition ==
In 1993, Marc Anthony released his second studio album Otra Nota (1993), his first salsa record, which was arranged and produced by Sergio George. The album sold over 200,000 copies and it earned the singer the Billboard Latin Music Award for "Tropical/Salsa New Artist of the Year" in 1994. Two years later, Marc Anthony released a follow-up record to Otra Nota entitled Todo a Su Tiempo, which George also produced alongside Anthony. Three songs for the album were penned by Panamanian songwriter Omar Alfanno, including the salsa track "Te Conozco Bien". On the chorus, Marc Anthony repeats "me atrevería a decir que estás arrepentida" ("I'd dare say that you are regretful").

== Promotion and reception ==
"Te Conozco Bien" was released as the first promotional single from the album on May 30, 1995. A truncated version of the song was added to Marc Anthony's greatest hits album Desde un Principio: From the Beginning (1999), while the original recording was included on the compilation album Éxitos Eternos (2003). Marc Anthony delivered a performance the song in 2000 at in at the Madison Square Garden in New York City, which was later released on his live video album The Concert from Madison Square Garden (2001). In 2010, Puerto Rican singer Ángel López covered the song as a ballad on his studio album Historias de Amor, a collection of songs Alfanno had previously composed. The song, along with the rest of the album, was arranged and produced by Alfanno.

In an article highlighting the "Latino Night" show in 1996, Ron Sylvester of the Springfield News-Leader called "Te Conozco Bien" "one of the best dance tracks of the year". Retrospectively, the track was featured on Cosmopolitan's list of "14 Best Latin Songs You Forgot You Were Obsessed With", while La Prensa called it one of Marc Anthony's best 15 songs. At the 1996 Billboard Latin Music Awards, "Te Conozco Bien" won "Hot Latin Track of the Year" on the Tropical/Salsa field. The track was nominated in the category of Tropical Song of the Year at the 8th Annual Lo Nuestro Awards in the same year, ultimately losing to "Abriendo Puertas" by Gloria Estefan. The track was recognized as one of the best-performing songs of the year at the 1996 ASCAP Latin Awards. In the United States, "Te Conozco Bien" peaked at number seven on the Billboard Hot Latin Songs chart and reached the top position of the Tropical Airplay chart. It was the best-performing song of 1995 on the latter chart.

== Charts ==
=== Weekly charts ===
Chart performance for "Te Conozco Bien"
Chart (1995)	Peak position
US Hot Latin Songs (Billboard)	7
US Tropical Airplay (Billboard)	1

=== Year-end charts ===
1995 year-end chart performance for "Te Conozco Bien"
Chart (1995)	Position
US Hot Latin Songs (Billboard)	38
US Tropical Airplay (Billboard)	1

== See also ==
- List of Billboard Tropical Airplay number ones of 1994 and 1995
