= Gerardo Rodríguez (musician) =

- Born: Cuba
- Genres: Salsa; pop; latin; gospel; instrumental
- Occupations: Musician; songwriter; producer
- Instruments: Trumpet; flugelhorn; trombone

Gerardo Enrique Rodríguez is a Cuban-American musician, record producer and sound engineer, known for his work as a trumpeter for artists like Marc Anthony, Thalía, Maluma, Ricardo Arjona, Tito Nieves, Aymée Nuviola, Prince Royce, Camila Cabello and Ricardo Montaner, among others. For his work in the music industry, Rodríguez has garnered Latin Grammy nominations.

== Biography ==
=== Beginnings and career ===
Born in Cuba, the beginnings of his artistic career took place mainly in Miami, United States. As lead trumpet player, he has participated in records of salsa musicians like Oscar d'León, Marc Anthony, Tito Nieves, La India, Richie Ray, Víctor Manuelle, Rey Ruiz and Aymée Nuviola, as with artists of other genres like Maluma, Prince Royce, Ricardo Arjona, Thalía and Ricardo Montaner. He has also performed live in Europe and America, and has played at Radio City Music Hall in New York City on two occasions, with Montaner and Marc Anthony.

=== Latin Grammy Award Nominations and present day ===
In 2016, Rodríguez joined Marc Anthony's band as a musician. Two years later he participated as a trumpeter in the album Como anillo al dedo by Aymée Nuviola, which achieved a nomination for the Latin Grammy Awards in the category of best tropical fusion album. Also in 2018 he was invited by Cuban musician and composer Chucho Valdés to play lead trumpet in the jazz supergroup Irakere during a long world tour.

In 2019, Rodríguez participated in the recording of Marc Anthony's album Opus, and three years later he achieved a new nomination to the Latin Grammy Awards in his role as producer and sound engineer in the category of album of the year for his work in Pa'llá voy, by the American singer. During a presentation of the tour of this album in the city of Valencia, Spain, Rodríguez played with his trumpet the Anthem of Cuba as a tribute to his native country.

In 2022 he shared the stage with singer Camila Cabello as lead trumpet player during a performance of the artist during Hispanic Heritage Month in Miami, and in November of the same year he premiered in YouTube the instrumental song "Mary Did You Know", accompanied by a gospel choir and a string orchestra.

Other notable albums in which he has participated as a musician or producer since the 2010s include Tony Succar Más de mí, Prince Royce Five and Ricardo Arjona Circo soledad. Based in Miami, Rodriguez has also recorded television appearances at events such as the Grammy Awards, Premios Lo Nuestro and Latin Grammy Awards, among others.

Musical company Victory Musical Instruments designed a special edition trumpet in honor of the musician, known as the "Trumpet of Jesus".

== Featured discography ==
Year	Title	Artist	Role
2017	Circo Soledad	Ricardo Arjona	Trumpeter
2017	Five	Prince Royce	Trumpeter
2018	Nunca es tarde	Felipe Muñiz	Trumpeter
2019	Believed	Elysanij	Producer and songwriter
2019	Más de mí	Tony Succar	Trumpeter
2019	Opus	Marc Anthony	Trumpeter
2020	Salsa, Jazz & Beethoven	Richie Ray	Trumpeter
2022	Pa'llá voy	Marc Anthony	Producer and sound engineer
2022	¡Señor, sostenme!	Jaime Rosa	Trumpeter and bassist

== Awards and recognitions ==
Year	Event	Category	Nominated work	Result
2018	Latin Grammy Awards	Best tropical fusion album	Como anillo al dedo	Nominated
2022	Latin Grammy Awards	Album of the year	Pa'llá voy	Nominated
