= Boris Silva =

Musician

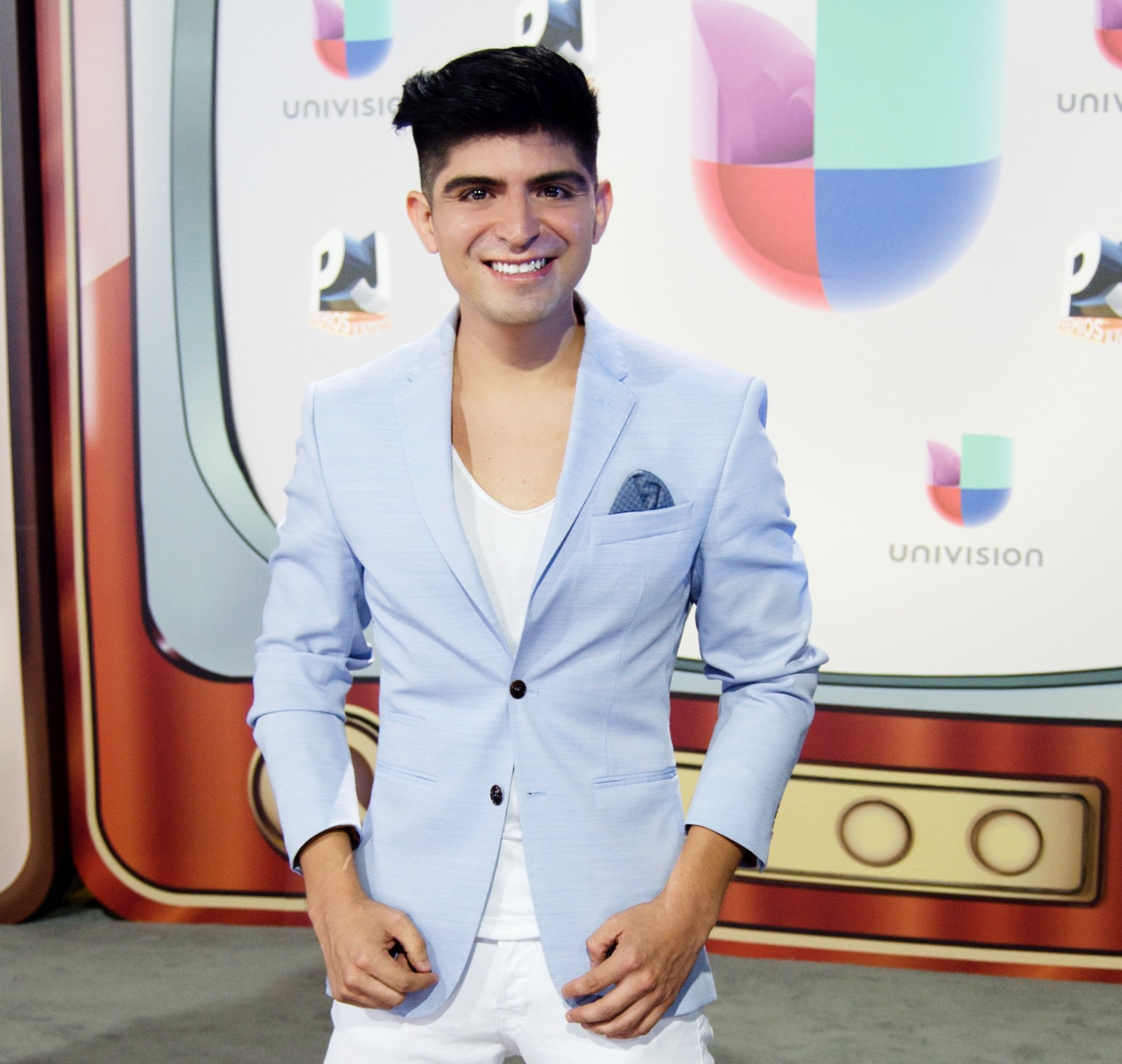
- Boris Silva in Univision's Premios Juventud 2016

Background information
- Genres: Latin pop; Tropical; Kizomba; Bachata
- Occupations: Musician; singer
- Instruments: Vocals; guitar; piano
- Years active: 2010–present
- Label: Latin Premier
- Website: www.borissilva.com

Boris Silva is a musician based in Miami, Florida. He has worked with leading music artists of the latin pop genre, such as, Prince Royce, Marco Antonio Solís and Camila. Silva performs in English, Spanish and Portuguese, and plays guitar and piano.

== Early life ==
Silva spent part of his childhood in Lima, Peru. Silva attended a jesuit school where his musical inclinations were fostered since he was a kid. He took classes in Lima Music Conservatory as he developed his music composition, piano, guitar, and vocal skills.

== Music career ==
Silva started writing music and performing at a very young age. During his teen years, he was already performing in several famous music venues of Lima including La Estación de Barranco and Florentino Bar.

Once he was back in the United States, he began his venture as a solo artist. Silva recorded an amateur demo entitled Extranjero which led him to meet well-known industry and radio personalities such as Al Zamora and Pete Manriquez, who started mentoring him. In between 2012 and 2014, Silva released the singles of his first album entitled Mentirosa which gave him the opportunity to tour the continent as well as play in concerts alongside renowned artists such as Prince Royce, Camila and Marco Antonio Solís.

From 2015 to 2018, Boris Silva worked on new records teaming up with acclaimed producers including Efrain "Junito" Dávila, Guianko Gomez, and Juan Mario "Mayito" Aracil, who are known for having worked with industry greats such as Marc Anthony, Victor Manuelle, and Carlos Vives. Singles "Bomba Kizomba" and "Eres Tú" granted Silva radio airplay throughout Latin America and millions of streams across digital platforms.

Silva's salsa music releases gained widespread recognition worldwide, particularly with the songs "La Rebelión" in 2019 and "Tusa" in 2020, which became popular favorites among fitness enthusiasts. In 2021, Boris Silva expanded his career by writing music for other artists, earning placements with legendary acts such as Jory Boy and Makano. In 2022, Silva collaborated with Makano to write, sing, and produce the single "Quítame El Teléfono (Versión Salsa)," featuring Josimar y Su Yambú. The song achieved significant success, leading Boris Silva to join Makano on tour in 2023.

== Discography ==
- Quítame El Teléfono (En Vivo) (2023)
- Quítame El Teléfono (Versión Salsa) (2022)
- Fruta Prohibida (2022)
- Mentiras / Idiota (2022)
- Cicatrices (2021)
- De Los Besos Que Te Di (Versión Salsa / Cumbia) (2021)
- Tattoo / La Curiosidad (Versión Salsa) (2020)
- Relación / Porfa (Versión Salsa) (2020)
- Bonita (2020)
- Hacerlo de Día (Versión Salsa) (2020)
- Tusa (Versión Salsa) (2020)
- La Rebelión (2019)
- Eres Tú (Versión Bachata) (2018)
- Bomba Kizomba (2017)
- Eres Tú (2016)
- Mentirosa – Special Edition (2014)
- Mentirosa (2012)
