= Latin Music Hall of Fame =

The Latin Music Hall of Fame may refer one of the following:

- The Billboard Latin Music Hall of Fame, an award presented by Billboard magazine established in 1994.
- The International Latin Music Hall of Fame, established in 1999
