= Llegaste a Mi =

1996 single by Marc Anthony

Single by Marc Anthony

from the album Todo a Su Tiempo
- Language: Spanish
- Released: 1996
- Studio: Quad Recording, New York City, NY
- Genre: Salsa
- Length: 4:58
- Label: RMM
- Songwriter(s): Omar Alfanno
- Producer(s): Marc Anthony; Sergio George

Marc Anthony singles chronology
"Te Amaré" (1996)	"Llegaste a Mi" (1996)	"Así Como Hoy" (1996)

"Llegaste a Mi" (English: "You Came to Me") is a song written by Omar Alfanno and performed by American singer Marc Anthony on his studio album Todo a Su Tiempo (1995) and was released as the fifth single from the album. The song is dedicated to his daughter, Arianna Muñiz. It became his fifth number song on the Tropical Airplay chart in the US. The track was nominated in the category of Tropical Song of the Year at the 9th Annual Lo Nuestro Awards in 1997, ultimately losing to "La Morena" by Ilegales. It was recognized as one of the best-performing songs of the year at the 1997 ASCAP Latin Awards on the tropical field.

== Charts ==
=== Weekly charts ===
Chart (1996)	Peak position
US Hot Latin Songs (Billboard)	11
US Tropical Airplay (Billboard)	1

=== Year-end charts ===
Chart (1996)	Position
US Tropical Airplay (Billboard)	8

== See also ==
- List of Billboard Tropical Airplay number ones of 1996
