= Se Me Sigue Olvidando =

1986 song by José Feliciano

Single by José Feliciano

from the album Te Amaré
- Released: 1986
- Recorded: 1986
- Genre: Latin pop · latin ballad
- Length: 4:28
- Label: RCA Ariola
- Songwriter: Rudy Pérez
- Producer: Rudy Pérez

José Feliciano singles chronology
"By Design" (1986)	"Se Me Sigue Olvidando" (1986)	"Te Amaré" (1987)

"Se Me Sigue Olvidando" (I Keep Forgetting) is a ballad written and produced by Rudy Pérez and performed by Puerto Rican-American singer-songwriter José Feliciano on his studio album Te Amaré (1986). The song reached number six on the Billboard Hot Latin Songs chart.

== Marc Anthony version ==
"Se Me Sigue Olvidando"

Single by Marc Anthony

from the album Todo a Su Tiempo
- Language: Spanish
- Released: 1995
- Studio: Quad Recording, New York City, NY
- Genre: Salsa
- Length: 4:55
- Label: RMM
- Songwriter: Rudy Pérez
- Producers: Marc Anthony; Sergio George

Marc Anthony singles chronology
"Te Conozco Bien" (1995)	"Se Me Sigue Olvidando" (1995)	"Nadie Como Ella" (1995)

Puerto Rican-American salsa singer-songwriter Marc Anthony covered "Se Me Sigue Olvidando" on his second studio album Todo a Su Tiempo (1995). Billboard critic John Lannert cited "Se Me Sigue Olvidando" and "Nadie Como Ella" as one of the albums "upbeat entries". Anthony's version was recognized as one of the best-performing songs of the year at the 1996 ASCAP Latin Awards.

=== Weekly charts ===
Chart (1995)	Peak position
US Hot Latin Songs (Billboard)	6
US Tropical Airplay (Billboard)	1

=== Year-end charts ===
Chart (1995)	Position
US Tropical Airplay (Billboard)	2

== See also ==
- List of Billboard Tropical Airplay number ones of 1994 and 1995
