= Todo a Su Tiempo (Marc Anthony album) =

Studio album by Marc Anthony
- Released: May 31, 1995
- Studio: Sound on Sound Studios; Quad Recording Studios (New York, New York)
- Genre: Salsa; tropical
- Length: 42:57
- Language: Spanish
- Label: RMM
- Producer: Sergio George; Marc Anthony

Marc Anthony chronology
| Otra Nota (1993) | Todo a Su Tiempo (1995) | Contra la Corriente (1997) |

Singles from Todo a Su Tiempo
- 1. "Te Conozco Bien" Released: May 1995; 2. "Se Me Sigue Olvidando" Released: 1995; 3. "Nadie Como Ella" Released: 1995; 4. "Te Amaré" Released: 1996; 5. "Llegaste a Mi" Released: 1996; 6. "Hasta Ayer" Released: 1996; 7. "Por Amar Se Da Todo" Released: 1996; 8. "Vieja Mesa" Released: 1997

Todo a Su Tiempo (English: All in Due Time) is the second studio album by American recording artist Marc Anthony, released by RMM Records on May 31, 1995. The album was produced by Sergio George, who was also involved with production of Anthony's debut studio album, Otra Nota. The album comprises five new compositions, three of which were written by Omar Alfanno, and four cover versions. Eight singles were released from the album, all but one of which topped the Billboard Tropical Songs chart.

Todo a Su Tiempo peaked at number six on the Billboard Latin Albums chart and debuted at number one on the Billboard Tropical Albums chart. The album garnered critical praise as a major improvement over his first album and for revolutionizing the salsa music genre. It received a Grammy nomination, a Billboard Latin Music award, and a Lo Nuestro award. Two years later, the album made history as the first salsa disc to be certified gold by the Recording Industry Association of America (RIAA). Since the album's release, it has sold over 800,000 copies.

== Background ==
In 1993, Marc Anthony released his salsa debut Otra Nota which sold over 200,000 copies and earned the singer the Billboard Latin Music Award for "Tropical/Salsa New Artist of the Year" and the Lo Nuestro Award for Tropical New Artist of the Year in 1994. Following the release of Otra Nota, he performed a duet with fellow Puerto Rican American singer La India on the track "Vivir Lo Nuestro" on the RMM live album Combinación Perfecta (1994). For Todo a Su Tiempo, Anthony collaborated with Sergio George who produced his previous album and "Vivir Lo Nuestro". Recording for the album took place at the Sound on Sound Studios and the Quad Recording Studios in New York City. According to George, whereas Otra Nota was an experimental and low budget album, he allowed Anthony to choose his own material and described the recording as more "mixed and aggressive" on Todo a Su Tiempo. Anthony mentioned that Todo a Su Tiempo took two years to complete as he wanted to ensure a quality product. He further explained on the naming of the album: "The album took awhile, but I learned that you can't be afraid of time, waiting. I also learned there is a right time for everything which is why I named the album Todo a Su Tiempo

== Composition and covers ==
The album comprises nine tracks, four of which are covers of songs previously recorded by several performers. Panamanian songwriter Omar Alfanno composed three tracks from the album: "Te Conozco Bien" ("I Know You Well"), "Nadie Como Ella" ("Nobody Like Her"), and "Llegaste a Mi" ("You Came to Me"). The ballad "Y Sigues Siendo Tu" ("And You Still Being You") was composed by Puerto Rican composers Eduardo Reyes, Laura Reyes, and Guadalupe Garcia. "Vieja Mesa" ("Old Table") was composed by Dominican musician Víctor Víctor. The song incorporates the sound of bachata-influenced bolero. "Se Me Sigue Olvidando" ("I'm Still Forgetting") was first performed by José Feliciano on his 1986 album, Te Amaré. "Por Amar Se Da Todo" ("To Love Gives Everything") was performed by Danny Rivera on the 1983 album of the same name. Manny Delgado wrote the song "Hasta Ayer" ("Until Yesterday") for the Venezuelan pop band Los Terrícolas in 1979. In the album, Anthony recorded the song as a bolero. "Te Amaré" ("I Will Love You") was written by The Barrio Boyzz member Angel Ramirez Jr. for their 1993 album, Donde Quiera Que Estés.

== Singles ==
"Te Conozco Bien" was the lead single from the album. It peaked at number seven on the Billboard Latin Song chart and became his first number-one single on the Billboard Tropical Song chart. The song spent eight weeks on top of the chart and was named the best-performing tropical song of the year. The second single, "Se Me Sigue Olvidando", reached number six on the Billboard Latin Songs chart. It became his second number-one single on the Billboard Tropical Songs chart; it spent six weeks on top of the chart. The third single, "Nadie Como Ella", peaked at number thirteen on the Billboard Latin songs and became his third number-one on the Tropical Songs chart. The fourth single, "Te Amaré", reached number six on the Billboard Latin Songs chart and became his fourth single to reach number one on the Tropical Songs chart. The fifth single, "Llegaste a Mi", reached number eleven on the Billboard Latin Songs chart and spent two weeks number one on the Billboard Tropical Songs chart. "Hasta Ayer" was the sixth single to be released from the album. It peaked at number six on the Billboard Latin Songs chart and was number one on the Billboard Tropical Songs for three weeks. As the song was a bolero, RMM executive Ralph Mercado responded to the success of the song by stating that Anthony was no longer just a salsa musician. The seventh single, "Por Amar Se da Todo", peaked at number seventeen on the Billboard Latin Songs and at number one on the Billboard Tropical Songs chart. The last single, "Vieja Mesa", peaked at number seven on the Billboard Tropical Songs chart.

== Critical reception ==
Professional ratings
Review scores
| Source | Rating |
|---|---|
| Allmusic | 4.5/5 stars |
| Billboard | Favorable |
| Chicago Tribune | 4/4 stars |

Todo a Su Tiempo received praise from music critics. Evan Gutierrez of Allmusic gave the album a 4.5 out of 5 stars, praising the album as a step forward over Otra nota. He described Anthony's voice as "soaring" and "luminescent". He cited the album as setting the bar for salsa music and closed the review by it calling the album "without question one of the finest salsa records of the '90s". Achy Obejas of the Chicago Tribune gave the album a four-star rating and enjoyed how Anthony put a variety of sounds, including hip-hop and R&B, to "good use". She referred to "Hasta Ayer" as "an oldie but goodie totally transformed by soulful crooning". Billboard's mentioned Anthony as "grafting his muy soulful baritone onto vivid romantic narratives" and acknowledged "Nadie Como Ella" and "Se Me Sigue Olvidando" as "upbeat". A writer for the Village Voice penned that the tracks were "nine swirling, complex dance tunes". In 2015, Billboard listed Todo a Su Tiempo as one of the Essential Latin Albums of Past 50 Years stating that the album "launched Anthony to fame as an instant salsa superstar and it wasn't long before he was a household name".

At the 38th Grammy Awards, the album received a nomination for "Best Tropical Latin Performance", which was awarded to Gloria Estefan's Abriendo Puertas. Anthony received two Billboard Latin Music Awards, including "Tropical/Salsa Album of the Year" and "Tropical/Salsa Hot Latin Track of the Year" for the song "Te Conozco Bien". In 1996, the album received a Lo Nuestro Award nomination for "Tropical Album of the Year" which it won the following year.

== Commercial performance ==
Todo a Su Tiempo was released on May 30, 1995, in the United States and was distributed by Sony Music until 1996, when it was distributed by Universal Music Group. The album debuted at number six on the Billboard Latin Albums chart for the week of June 17, 1995. The same week, the album debuted at number one on the Billboard Tropical Albums and remained in that position for five consecutive weeks. A year later, the album returned to number one on the chart, and held the position for a total of six non-consecutive weeks. It was third-best-selling tropical album of 1996 in the United States. During the week of April 12, 1997, the album once again reached number one the chart and held the position for four weeks. Two years after the album was released, it became the first salsa disc to receive a gold certification by the RIAA for shipments of 500,000 units. The album has sold over 800,000 copies as of 2001.

== Track listing ==
Todo a Su Tiempo track listing
| No. | Title | Writer(s) | Length |
|---|---|---|---|
| 1. | "Se Me Sigue Olvidando" | Rudy Pérez | 4:55 |
| 2. | "Te Conozco Bien" | Omar Alfanno | 5:16 |
| 3. | "Hasta Ayer" | Manny Delgado | 4:40 |
| 4. | "Nadie Como Ella" | Alfanno | 4:58 |
| 5. | "Te Amaré" | Angel Ramirez Jr. | 4:49 |
| 6. | "Llegaste a Mi" | Alfanno | 4:58 |
| 7. | "Y Sigues Siendo Tú" | Eduardo Reyes; Guadalupe García; Laura Reyes | 4:36 |
| 8. | "Por Amar Se Da Todo" | Salako | 5:01 |
| 9. | "Vieja Mesa" | Víctor Víctor | 4:24 |

== Personnel ==
The following credits are from Allmusic and from Todo a Su Tiempo liner notes.

=== Musicians ===
- Bobby Allende – percussion
- Marc Anthony – coro
- William Cepeda – trombone
- William Duval – coro, background vocals
- Angel Fernandez – arranger, trumpet
- Sergio George – arranger, coro, keyboards, piano, music producer, background vocals
- Ite Jeres – trumpet
- Lewis Kahn – trombone, violin
- Luis Lopez – trombone
- Marc Quiñones – percussion
- Luis Quintero – percussion
- Piro Rodriguez – trumpet
- Rubén Rodríguez – bass guitar
- Bernd Shoenhart – acoustic guitar

=== Production ===
- Gabriela Anders – noise, sound effects
- Daniel Hastings – cartel photography, album concept, art direction, photography
- Miguel Rivera – art direction, concept, graphic design
- Charlie Dos Santos – engineer, mixing
- Rich Davis – production coordination
- Antionette Hamilton – hair stylist, make-up
- David Lescoe – engineer
- Ralph Mercado – executive producer
- Julio Peña – engineer
- Kurt Upper – mixing

== Charts ==
=== Weekly charts ===
| Chart (1995) | Peak position |
|---|---|
| U.S. Billboard Top Latin Albums | 6 |
| U.S. Billboard Tropical Albums | 1 |
| U.S. Billboard Heatseekers Albums | 21 |

=== Year-end charts ===
| Chart (1995) | Peak position |
|---|---|
| U.S. Billboard Top Latin Albums | 27 |
| U.S. Billboard Tropical Albums | 5 |
| Chart (1996) | Peak position |
| U.S. Billboard Top Latin Albums | 23 |
| U.S. Billboard Tropical Albums | 3 |

== Certifications ==
| Region | Certification | Certified units/sales |
|---|---|---|
| United States (RIAA) | Gold | 500,000^{^} |
^{^} Shipments figures based on certification alone.

== Release history ==
List of release dates, showing country, formats, record label, and catalog number
| Region | Date | Format | Label | Catalog |
|---|---|---|---|---|
| United States | May 30, 1995 | CD, cassette | Soho Latino, Sony | |
| United States | March 5, 1996 | CD, cassette | RMM Records | B00000123U |
| Canada | March 5, 1996 | CD, cassette | RMM Records | B00000123U |
| United Kingdom | October 11, 1996 | CD, cassette | RMM Records | B00000123U |
| France | September 7, 1999 | CD | RMM Records | B00004VM76 |
| United States | September 9, 2003 | CD, remastered | Universal Music Latino | B0000C3I32 |
| Spain | January 31, 2005 | CD, remastered | Universal Music | |

== See also ==
- 1995 in Latin music
- List of number-one Billboard Tropical Albums from the 1990s
- Music of Puerto Rico
