= Nadie Como Ella =

1995 song by Marc Anthony

Single by Marc Anthony

from the album Todo a Su Tiempo
- Language: Spanish
- Released: 1995
- Studio: Quad Recording, New York City, NY
- Genre: Salsa
- Length: 4:58
- Label: RMM
- Songwriter: Omar Alfanno
- Producers: Marc Anthony; Sergio George

Marc Anthony singles chronology
"Se Me Sigue Olvidando" (1995)	"Nadie Como Ella" (1995)	"Te Amaré" (1996)

"Nadie Como Ella" (English: "[There Is] Nobody Like Her") is a song written by Omar Alfanno and performed by American singer Marc Anthony on his studio album Todo a Su Tiempo (1995) and was released as the third single from the album. A music video for the song was released in 1995 and features Puerto Rican actress Roselyn Sánchez. Cashbox critic Héctor Reséndez remarked on the video that "the actor-singer offers his best video performance as being completely enamored with a beautiful woman". A live version of the song was included on Anthony's compilation album Éxitos Eternos (2003).

== Charts ==
Chart (1995)	Peak position
US Hot Latin Songs (Billboard)	13
US Tropical Airplay (Billboard)	1

== See also ==
- List of Billboard Tropical Airplay number ones of 1994 and 1995
- List of Billboard Tropical Airplay number ones of 1996
