= Billboard Latin Music Lifetime Achievement Award =

American music award

- Awarded for: "an enduring and exceptional career, encompassing artistic and personal contributions that have had a major impact on Latin music worldwide."
- Presented by: Billboard
- First award: 1993
- Currently held by: Cristian Castro (2026)
- Website: billboard.com/latin

The Billboard Latin Music Lifetime Achievement Award is an honor that is presented by Billboard magazine to an artist or a group "an enduring and exceptional career, encompassing artistic and personal contributions that have had a major impact on Latin music worldwide." From 1993 to 2001, the accolade was presented as "El Premio Billboard" (English: The Billboard Award). The recipient of the Lifetime Achievement Award is decided by the Billboard editorial committee. The Lifetime Achievement Award was first given to Morton Gould, the president of the American Society of Composers, Authors and Publishers (ASCAP), during the 4th Annual Billboard Latin Music Conference in 1993. Gould was given the accolade for his "contribution to the growth of Latin music in the U.S".

From 1994, the Lifetime Achievement Award has been presented during the Billboard Latin Music Awards. The accolade is usually awarded to a recording artist, but may be presented to industry figures who have helped raise the awareness of Spanish-language music globally. Emilio Estefan, Ralph Mercado, and Jorge Pinos, are recipients of the Lifetime Achievement Award who worked in the music industry to promote Latin music. The award was not presented in 2003, 2004, 2006, and 2025.

Mexican singer-songwriter Marco Antonio Solís has been given the Lifetime Achievement twice, once in 2005 and again in 2016, to commemorate his 30th and 40th anniversary as a recording artist respectively. Solís, José José, and Armando Manzanero are recipients of the Lifetime Achievement who have also been inducted into the Billboard Latin Music Hall of Fame.

== Recipients ==
Key
‡	Indicates non-performing recipient

Year	Image	Recipient	Nationality	Ref.
1993	—	Morton Gould	United States	
1994	Emilio Estefan	Emilio Estefan‡	Cuba; United States	
1995	Tito Puente	Tito Puente	United States	
1996	José Feliciano	José Feliciano	Puerto Rico	
1997	Herb Alpert	Herb Alpert	United States	
1998	—	Ralph Mercado‡	United States	
1999	Flaco Jiménez	Flaco Jiménez	United States	
2000		Jorge Pinos‡	Ecuador	
2001	Los Lobos	Los Lobos	United States	
2002	El Gran Combo de Puerto Rico	El Gran Combo de Puerto Rico	Puerto Rico	
2003	No award			
2004	No award			
2005	Marco Antonio Solís	Marco Antonio Solís	Mexico	
2006	No award			
2007	Miguel Bosé	Miguel Bosé	Spain	
2008	Conjunto Primavera	Conjunto Primavera	Mexico	
2009	altCarlos Santana	Carlos Santana	Mexico; United States	
2010	Los Temerarios	Los Temerarios	Mexico	
2011	Emmanuel	Emmanuel	Mexico	
2012		Intocable	Mexico	
2013		José José	Mexico	
2014		Andrea Bocelli	Italy	
2015		Roberto Carlos	Brazil	
2016		Marco Antonio Solís	Mexico	
2017		Ricardo Arjona	Guatemala	
2018		Maná	Mexico	
2019		Juan Luis Guerra	Dominican Republic	
2020		Armando Manzanero	Mexico	
2021		Paquita la del Barrio	Mexico	
2022		Raphael	Spain	
2023		Los Ángeles Azules	Mexico	
2024		Alejandro Sanz	Spain	
2025	No award			
2026		Cristian Castro	Mexico	

== See also ==
- Billboard Latin Music Hall of Fame
- Latin Grammy Lifetime Achievement Award
- Lo Nuestro Excellence Award
- List of lifetime achievement awards
