= Te Amaré (The Barrio Boyzz song) =

1994 single by The Barrio Boyzz

Single by Barrio Boyzz

from the album Donde Quiera Que Estés
- Released: 1994
- Genre: Latin pop
- Length: 4:40
- Label: EMI Latin
- Songwriter: Angel Ramirez
- Producers: A.T.N., Randy Barlow, Emilio Estefan, Donny Nguyen, KC Porter, Andrew Snook, Richard Wolf

Barrio Boyzz singles chronology
"Donde Quiera Que Estés" (1994)	"Te Amaré" (1994)	"Reencuentro" (1995)

"Te Amaré" (I Will Love You) is a song performed by Latin pop boy band The Barrio Boyzz and written by one of its band members, Angel Ramirez, on their second studio album Donde Quiera Que Estés (1993). It peaked at number 16 on the Hot Latin Songs chart.

== Marc Anthony version ==
"Te Amaré"

Single by Marc Anthony

from the album Todo a Su Tiempo
- Language: Spanish
- Released: 1996
- Studio: Quad Recording, New York City, NY
- Genre: Salsa
- Length: 4:49
- Label: RMM
- Songwriter: Rudy Pérez
- Producers: Marc Anthony; Sergio George

Marc Anthony singles chronology
"Nadie Como Ella" (1995)	"Te Amaré" (1996)	"Llegaste a Mi" (1996)

American salsa singer Marc Anthony covered "Te Amaré" on his studio album Todo a Su Tiempo (1995). It became his fourth #1 song on the Tropical Airplay chart. The track was recognized as one of the best-performing songs of the year at the 1997 ASCAP Latin Awards on the tropical field.

=== Charts ===
Chart (1995)	Peak position
US Hot Latin Songs (Billboard)	6
US Tropical Airplay (Billboard)	1

== See also ==
- List of Billboard Tropical Airplay number ones of 1996
