= Ray Sepúlveda =

American salsa singer

Ray Sepúlveda is a salsa singer born in Brooklyn, New York of Puerto Rican descent. He recorded three albums with Orchestra Sociedad 76 in the late 1970s and two albums forming the Johnny & Ray Orchestra (Salsa con Clase) in the late 1980s before launching a solo career in the early 1990s.

Sepúlveda grew up in Brooklyn and the Bronx, where his father, Ramon Sepúlveda, sang boleros with his group Trio Los Romanticos. When he was a teenager, his family moved to Puerto Rico, where Sepúlveda sang with local groups in Mayaguez, including Orquesta La Justicia & Orquesta La Dictadora with Frankie Ruiz.

In 1977 he returned to New York and recorded with Orquesta Sociedad 76 with Johnny Zamot and was part of that band for four years and recorded three albums. In early 1983 he worked with Adalberto Santiago. He left music from late 1983 until the middle of 1988, when he and Zamot formed the group Johnny & Ray. Their first album, Salsa Con Clase, featured the hit singles "Mi amor, amor", "Mascarada", "Es Mi mujer", "Sin Saber", and "Margarita". The second Johnny & Ray album included the hit singles, "Bandolera", "Mientete", "Una Mujer como tu" and "Ahora me toca a Mi".

Sepúlveda's solo career started in 1991 with the album Un Poquito Mas, produced by Sergio George for Sony/RMM Records. In 1992 Con Sabor reached the Latin Billboard charts. In 1993 he participated in the "Familia RMM Combinacion Perfecta Album" recording a duet with Johnny Rivera titled "No Vale La Pena" which became one of the biggest International Hits of the production. In 1994 Llegaste Tú, produced by Julito Alvarado and recorded in Puerto Rico, 1997 De Todo Un Poco, produced by Ricky Gonzalez and he returned in 1999 with another hit single, "Eres" in an album titled ¡Salsabor! This album was produced in Puerto Rico by Luis Garcia.

== Discography ==
- Salsa Con Clase with Johnny & Ray (Polygram, 1988)
- Night Gold with Johnny & Ray (Polygram, 1989)
- Un Poquito Más (RMM, 1991)
- Con Sabor (RMM 1992)
- Combinación Perfecta with Familia RMM (RMM, 1993)
- Llegaste Tú (RMM 1994)
- De Todo Un Poco (RMM, 1997)
- ¡Salsabor! (RMM, 1999)

== Compilations ==
- Los Maestros de la Salsa (Solo Album, 1996)
- Lo Mejor de Ray Sepúlveda: Éxitos, Solo Éxitos (Solo Album, 2000)
