= 1996 Latin Billboard Music Awards =

3rd annual Billboard Latin Music Awards

1996 Billboard Latin Music Awards
- Date: April, 1996
- Venue: Gusman Center for the Performing Arts, Miami, Florida, United States

The 3rd annual Billboard Latin Music Awards which honor the most popular albums, songs, and performers in Latin music took place in Miami.

== Pop ==
=== Pop hot latin track of the year ===
- Vuélveme a Querer — Cristian Castro

=== Pop album of the year, Male ===
- La Carretera — Julio Iglesias

=== Pop album of the year, female ===
- Dreaming of You — Selena

=== Pop album of the year, duo or group ===
- Por Amor a Mi Pueblo — Marco Antonio Solís y Los Bukis

=== Pop album of the year, new artist ===
- Enrique Iglesias — Enrique Iglesias

=== Pop video of the year ===
- No Encuentro Un Momento Pa' Olvidar — Miguel Bosé

== Tropical/Salsa ==
=== Tropical/salsa hot latin track of the year ===
- Te Conozco Bien — Marc Anthony

=== Tropical/salsa album of the year, male ===
- Todo a Su Tiempo — Marc Anthony

=== Tropical/salsa album of the year, female ===
- Abriendo Puertas — Gloria Estefan

=== Tropical/salsa album of the year, duo or group ===
- Los Dueños del Swing — Los Hermanos Rosario

=== Tropical/salsa album of the year, new artist ===
- No Se Parece a Nada — Albita

=== Tropical/salsa video of the year ===
- Abriendo Puertas — Gloria Estefan

== Regional Mexican ==
=== Regional Mexican hot latin track of the year ===
- Tú Sólo Tú — Selena

=== Regional Mexican album of the year, male ===
- Cómo Te Extraño — Pete Astudillo

=== Regional Mexican album of the year, female ===
- Joyas de dos siglos — Ana Gabriel

=== Regional Mexican album of the year, duo or group ===
- El Ejemplo — Los Tigres del Norte

=== Regional Mexican album of the year, new artist ===
- Elida y Avante — Elida y Avante

=== Regional Mexican video of the year ===
- Tú Sólo Tú — Selena

== Other awards ==
=== Hot latin tracks artist of the year ===
- Selena

=== Latin rap album of the year ===
- Club 555 — El General

=== Latin pop/rock album of the year ===
- Cuando los Ángeles Lloran — Maná

=== Contemporary Latin jazz album of the year ===
- Arturo Sandoval & the Latin Train — Arturo Sandoval

=== Latin dance single of the year ===
- Abriendo Puertas — Gloria Estefan

=== Latin dance album of the year ===
- Macarena Mix — Various Artists with Los del Río

=== Rock video of the year ===
- La Chispa Adecuada — Héroes del Silencio

=== Songwriter of the year ===
- Marco Antonio Solís

=== Publisher of the year ===
- BMG Songs Inc.

=== Publishing corporation of the year ===
- BMG Music Publishing Inc.

=== Producer of the year ===
- Marco Antonio Solís

=== Spirit Of Hope ===
- Gloria Estefan

=== Billboard Lifetime achievement award ===
- José Feliciano

=== Billboard Latin Music Hall of Fame ===
- Juan Gabriel
