= Libre (Marc Anthony album) =

Studio album by Marc Anthony
- Released: November 20, 2001
- Recorded: 2001
- Studio: Lobo Recording Studios (Long Island, New York)
- Genre: Salsa
- Label: Sony Discos; Columbia
- Producer: Marc Anthony; Juan A. González

Marc Anthony chronology
Desde un Principio: From the Beginning (1999)	Libre (2001)	Mended (2002)

Singles from Libre
- 1. "Celos" Released: October 1, 2001; 2. "Hasta Que Vuelvas Conmigo" Released: February 4, 2002; 3. "Amor Aventurero" Released: April 1, 2002; 4. "Viviendo" Released: May 13, 2002; 5. "Barco a la Deriva" Released: September 9, 2002

Professional ratings
Review scores
Source	Rating
Allmusic	4/5 stars

Libre (Free) is the fifth studio album and fourth Spanish language album by Marc Anthony. It was nominated for the 2002 Latin Grammy Award for Best Salsa Album and was nominated for the 2003 Grammy Awards for Best Salsa Album. This album became his third chart-topper in the Billboard Top Latin Albums chart, spending 14 weeks at number-one.

== Track listing ==
1. "Celos" ("Jealousy") - 4:47
2. "Este Loco Que Te Mira" ("This Crazy Guy Who Watches You") - 4:56
3. "Viviendo" ("Living") - 4:44
4. "Hasta Que Vuelvas Conmigo" ("Until You Come Back To Me") - 4:51
5. "Barco A La Deriva" ("Boat Adrift") - 4.33
6. "De Qué Depende" ("What does it Depend On") - 3:51
7. "Yo Te Quiero" ("I Want You") - 5:11
8. "Amor Aventurero" ("Adventurous Love") - 4:40
9. "Caminaré" ("I Will Walk") - 4:17
10. "Tragedia" ("Tragedy") (international edition - bonus track) - 3:47

== Personnel ==
- Primary Artist - Isabelle Antena
- Primary Artist - Marc Anthony

== Charts ==
Chart (2001)	Peak position
Spanish Albums Chart	66
U.S. Billboard 200	57
U.S. Billboard Top Latin Albums	1
U.S. Billboard Tropical Albums	1

== Certifications ==
Region	Certification	Certified units/sales
United States (RIAA)	Gold	500,000^{^}
^{^} Shipments figures based on certification alone.

== See also ==
- List of number-one Billboard Top Latin Albums of 2001
- List of number-one Billboard Top Latin Albums of 2002
- List of number-one Billboard Tropical Albums from the 2000s
