= Miles Peña =

Cuban salsa musician

Miles Peña (born José Antonio Peña) is a Cuban salsa musician.

Peña was a child actor, appearing in Los Arifices when he was eight years old. He studied at the Amdeo Rodán Music Academy and then moved to the Dominican Republic. In 1993 he signed with RMM Records and released his debut album. Among his hits on the Billboard Latin charts are "Corazón Partido", "Me Pasa Igual a Mí", and "Solito, Solo".

== Discography ==
- De Que Me Vale (1993)
- Miles Peña (1994)
- Torbellino de Amor (1996)
- Mis Ideas (1998)
- Lejos de Ti (2000)
- Que Seas Muy Feliz (2003)
