= Opus (Marc Anthony album) =

Studio album by Marc Anthony
- Released: May 10, 2019
- Genre: Salsa
- Length: 47:09
- Label: Sony Latin
- Producer: Marc Anthony; Sergio George

Marc Anthony chronology
3.0 (2013)	Opus (2019)	Pa'llá Voy (2022)

Singles from Opus
- 1. "Tu Vida en la Mía" Released: February 22, 2019; 2. "Parecen Viernes" Released: April 19, 2019; 3. "Lo Que Te Dí" Released: October 19, 2019; 4. "Un Amor Eterno (Salsa Version)" Released: November 12, 2020

Professional ratings
Review scores
Source	Rating
AllMusic	4/5 stars
Rolling Stone	3.5/5 stars

Opus is the tenth Spanish-language and twelfth studio album by American recording artist Marc Anthony, released on May 10, 2019, by Sony Music Latin. It is his first album since 3.0 (2013).

The album debuted at number 90 on the Billboard 200, number 2 on the Top Latin Albums and number 1 on the Tropical Albums chart with 9,000 album equivalent units.

== Accolades ==
Year	Award	Category	Result
2019	Latin American Music Awards	Favorite Tropical Album	Nominated
2020	Lo Nuestro Awards	Album of the Year	Nominated
2020	Grammy Awards	Best Tropical Latin Album	Won
2020	Billboard Latin Music Awards	Tropical Album of the Year	Nominated

== Track listing ==
No.	Title	Writer(s)	Length
1.	"Parecen Viernes"	Edgar Barrera; Sergio George; Juan Luis Londoño; Marco Antonio Muñiz; Stiven Rojas	4:28
2.	"Tu Vida en la Mía"	Luis Fernando Castillo; Santiago Castillo; Erika Ender; Muñiz	6:14
3.	"Un Amor Eterno (Salsa Version)"	Angel Arce; Sergio George; Muñiz	4:18
4.	"Si Me Creyeras"	Luis Fernando Castillo; Santiago Castillo; Oscar Hernandez; Muñiz; Julio Rodriguez	4:29
5.	"Soy Yo"	Angel Arce; Beatriz César; Muñiz	4:50
6.	"Lo Que Te Di"	L. Castillo; S. Castillo; George; Hernandez; Muñiz	4:03
7.	"Úsame"	L. Castillo; S. Castillo; George; Hernandez; Luis Leal; Muñiz	5:00
8.	"Si Pudiera"	L. Castillo; S. Castillo; Georg; Hernandez; Muñiz	4:26
9.	"Lo Peor de Mi"	L. Castillo; S. Castillo; George; Hernandez; Muñiz	5:11
10.	"Reconozco"	L. Castillo; S. Castillo; George; Hernandez; Muñiz	4:10

== Charts ==
=== Weekly charts ===
Chart (2019)	Peak position
Mexican Albums	7
Spanish Albums (PROMUSICAE)	5
Swiss Albums (Schweizer Hitparade)	87
US Billboard 200	90
US Top Latin Albums (Billboard)	2
US Tropical Albums (Billboard)	1

=== Year-end charts ===
Chart (2019)	Position
Mexican Albums	97
Spain (PROMUSICAE)	99
US Top Latin Albums (Billboard)	49
US Tropical Albums (Billboard)	7

== Certifications ==
Region	Certification	Certified units/sales
Mexico (AMPROFON)	Gold	30,000^{‡}
United States (RIAA)	2× Platinum (Latin)	120,000^{‡}
^{‡} Sales+streaming figures based on certification alone.

== Personnel ==
- Marc Anthony – Vocals, production
- Rubén Rodríguez – Bass
- Dan Warner – Guitar
- Jimmie Morales – Congas
- Sergio George – Keyboards, piano
- Robert Vilera – Shekere, triangle, timpani
- Gerardo Rodríguez – Trumpet
- Diego Galé – Bongos, triangle, maracas, guiro
- Ozzie Melendez – Trombone
- Bayron Ramos – Trombone
- William Cepeda – Trombone

== See also ==
- 2019 in Latin music
- List of Billboard Tropical Albums number ones from the 2010s
