= Guianko =

Cuban musician

Guianko Gomez Medina, born in Havana, Cuba, is a salsa singer.

Guianko's debut album, Llamame Yanko, was released in 1995. This album featured the song "Temes", which reached #11 on the Billboard Latin singles chart that year. He had a Spanish language hit worldwide with the song "A Sangre Fria" in 1997.

== Discography ==
- Llamame Yanko (RMM Records, 1995)
- A Sangre Fria (RMM, 1997)
- Mi Forma de Sentir (RMM, 1998)
