= Pa'llá Voy =

Paʼllá Voy

Studio album by Marc Anthony
- Released: March 4, 2022
- Genre: Salsa
- Length: 35:49
- Label: Sony Music Latin
- Producers: Marc Anthony; Sergio George

Marc Anthony chronology
Opus (2019)	Paʼllá Voy (2022)	Muevense (2024)

Singles from Pa'llá Voy
- 1. "Pa'llá Voy" Released: August 27, 2021; 2. "Mala" Released: November 12, 2021; 3. "Nada de Nada" Released: March 4, 2022

Paʼllá Voy is the eleventh Spanish-language and thirteenth studio album by American artist Marc Anthony, released on March 4, 2022, by Sony Music Latin and was his first album since the pandemic and Opus (2019). Produced by Marc Anthony with long-time collaborator Sergio George along with Motiff as associated producer, it consists of nine tracks of pure salsa. According to Marc himself, the album is a celebration of salsa in all its forms. Most of the songs are heavy on the soneos or improvisations that are at the heart of classic salsa. The title song is a cover of the 1992 song "Yay Boy" by the group Africando.

It received positive reviews from critics and was nominated for four Latin Grammy Awards at the 23rd Annual Latin Grammy Awards, including Record of the Year and Album of the Year, winning Best Salsa Album. In addition, it won Best Tropical Latin Album at the 65th Annual Grammy Awards.

It was supported by the release of three official singles: "Paʼllá voy", "Nada de nada" and "Mala". The album was released in physical format on April 22, 2022. The album landed at number 20 on Billboard Top Latin Albums and number 3 on US Tropical Albums. It also charted at number 30 on the Spanish album charts. To promote the album, Anthony embarked on the Paʼllá Voy Tour.

== Track listing ==
No.	Title	Length
1.	"Pa'llá Voy"	4:07
2.	"Yo Le Mentí"	4:35
3.	"No Se Quita"	3:40
4.	"Nada de Nada"	4:12
5.	"Amor No Tiene Sexo"	3:20
6.	"Mala"	3:48
7.	"Gimme Some More"	3:21
8.	"El Que Te Amaba"	4:08
9.	"Si Fuera Fácil"	4:38
Total length:		35:49

== Chart performance ==
Chart performance for Pa'llá Voy
Chart (2022)	Peak position
Spanish Albums Chart	30
U.S. Billboard Top Latin Albums	20
U.S. Billboard Tropical Albums	3

== Certifications ==
Certifications for Pa'llá Voy
Region	Certification	Certified units/sales
United States (RIAA)	Gold (Latin)	30,000^{‡}
^{‡} Sales+streaming figures based on certification alone.
