= Billboard Latin Music Hall of Fame =

American music award

- Awarded for: "artists who have achieved worldwide recognition for their work, transcending musical genres and languages".
- Presented by: Billboard
- First award: 1994
- Most Recent Inductee: Rosalía (2026)
- Website: https://www.billboardevents.com/latin

The Billboard Latin Music Hall of Fame is a rarely presented honor presented by American magazine Billboard at the Billboard Latin Music Awards. The accolade was established in 1994 to recognize "artists who have achieved worldwide recognition for their work, transcending musical genres and languages". This includes artists who laid the "artistic foundation" for contemporary Latin music. Potential recipients are nominated by Billboard's editorial committee, which decides the merit of each nominee with regard to their contribution to Latin music. Artists chosen to be inducted into the Latin Music Hall of Fame include individuals who exemplify Latin music, are pivotal or iconic pioneers, and whose works are a developmental milestone in the Latin music industry.

Cuban musicians Celia Cruz and Cachao were the first artists to be inducted into the Latin Music Hall of Fame at the inaugural Billboard Latin Music Awards in 1994. Selena and Raúl Alarcón, Sr. are the only recipients to have been inducted posthumously in 1995 and 2009, respectively. Selena was named "Hot Latin Track Artist of the Year" in the same year she was inducted. Alarcón, Sr. is the first non-recording artist to have been inducted into the Latin Music Hall of Fame. José José, Marco Antonio Solís, and Armando Manzanero have also been recipients of the Lifetime Achievement Award. José José received the Lifetime Achievement in 2013 while Solís was given the award twice, in 2005 and 2016 and Manzaero was presented with the accolade in 2020.

== Inductees ==
Key
†	Indicates posthumous induction

Year	Image	Inductee	Nationality	Rationale	Ref.
1994		Celia Cruz	Cuba	For their contributions to Afro-Cuban music in the 20th-century.	
1994		Cachao	Cuba	For their contributions to Afro-Cuban music in the 20th-century.	
1995		Selena†	United States	For her "numerous achievements" as a Tejano artist within three years before her death.	
1996		Juan Gabriel	Mexico	For composing "irresistibly catchy songs of common, everyday affairs which anyone can identify" for other artists and to himself.	
1997		José José	Mexico	For his 30 years of "caressing a multitude of unforgettable love songs with an earnest, yet seemingly vulnerable delivery".	
1998		Vicente Fernández	Mexico	For his ability to "connect emotionally with his listeners and fans, whether on CD or onstage" with his ranchera music.	
1999		Rocío Dúrcal	Spain	For her versatile performances of pop, Spanish, and Mexican music.	
2000		Marco Antonio Solís	Mexico	For his "quivering tenor, not to mention his writing and producing skills, has had a profound effect on Latin music" as well as influential in creating the grupera genre.	
2001		Mongo Santamaría	Cuba	For bridging "Afro-Cuban grooves, jazz and R&B" with his conga performances.	
2002	No induction				
2003		Armando Manzanero	Mexico	For his contribution to the Latin music genre by composing "romantic" songs.	
2004		Banda el Recodo	Mexico	"For their extraordinary 65 year-long career and successful bid to take Mexico's Banda music to virtually every corner of the world".	
2005	No induction				
2006		Joan Sebastian	Mexico	For his "stellar career that spans 30 years and more than 30 albums".	
2007	No induction				
2008	No induction				
2009	—	Raúl Alarcón, Sr.†	Cuba	"For his extraordinary contributions to the Latin radio and music business in the United States".	
2010	No induction				
2011	No induction				
2012		Marc Anthony	United States	"For his global influence as a performer in both the English and Spanish language markets".	
2013	No induction				
2014		Franco De Vita	Venezuela	For his "perceptive pop/rock ballads" that "have brought him international fame over his three-decade career".	
2015	No induction				
2016		Alejandro Fernández	Mexico	For launching his career "as a champion of ranchera music before crossing over to the Latin pop mainstream".	
2017	No induction				
2018	No induction				
2019	No induction				
2020	Carlos Vives	Carlos Vives	Colombia	For "his career as a singer-songwriter" and "his multifaceted career as a host, actor and philanthropist".	
2021	Daddy Yankee	Daddy Yankee	Puerto Rico	For his "fruitful career that spans over three decades as a pioneer and top exponent of reggaeton".	
2022	Nicky Jam	Nicky Jam	United States	For his "prolific work that transcends musical genres and languages".	
2023	No induction				
2024	Pepe Aguilar	Pepe Aguilar	Mexico	For captivating "audiences worldwide with his unique blend of traditional Mexican sounds and contemporary elements".	
2025	Elvis Crespo	Elvis Crespo	United States	For "his 30-year career".	
2026	Rosalía	Rosalía	Spain	For an "extraordinary career defined by musical innovation, a singular artistic vision and an influence that has transcended genres, languages and borders".	

== See also ==
- Billboard Icon Award
- Billboard Latin Music Lifetime Achievement Award
- International Latin Music Hall of Fame
- Latin Grammy Hall of Fame
- Latin Songwriters Hall of Fame
- List of halls and walks of fame
