= 1994 Latin Billboard Music Awards =

1st annual Billboard Latin Music Awards

1994 Billboard Latin Music Awards
- Date: April, 1994
- Venue: Miami, Florida

The 1st annual Billboard Latin Music Awards which honor the most popular albums, songs, and performers in Latin music took place in Miami.

== Pop ==
=== Pop album of the year ===
- Aries — Luis Miguel

=== Pop artist of the year, male ===
- Luis Miguel

=== Pop artist of the year, female ===
- Ana Gabriel

=== Pop duo or group of the year ===
- Gipsy Kings

=== Pop new artist of the year ===
- Maná

=== Pop song of the year ===
- Nunca Voy a Olvidarte — Cristian Castro

== Tropical/Salsa ==
=== Tropical/salsa album of the year ===
- Mi Tierra — Gloria Estefan

=== Tropical/salsa artist of the year, male ===
- Jerry Rivera

=== Tropical/salsa artist of the year, female ===
- Gloria Estefan

=== Tropical/salsa artist of the year, duo or group ===
- Juan Luis Guerra

=== Tropical/salsa artist of the year, new artist ===
- Marc Anthony

=== Tropical/salsa song of the year ===
- Mi Tierra — Gloria Estefan

== Regional Mexican ==
=== Regional Mexican album of the year ===
- Selena Live! — Selena

=== Regional Mexican artist of the year, male ===
- Emilio Navaira

=== Regional Mexican artist of the year, female ===
- Selena

=== Regional Mexican artist of the year, duo or group ===
- Banda Machos

=== Regional Mexican artist of the year, new artist ===
- Jay Perez

=== Regional Mexican song of the year ===
- Me Estoy Enamorando — La Mafia

== Other awards ==
=== Hot latin tracks of the year ===
- Me Estoy Enamorando — La Mafia

=== Hot latin tracks artist of the year ===
- Los Fantasmas del Caribe

=== Latin rap artist of the year ===
- El General

=== Latin rock artist of the year ===
- Maldita Vecindad

=== Latin pop/rock artist of the year ===
- Maná

=== Contemporary Latin jazz album of the year ===
- Dreams & Desires — Roberto Perera

=== Billboard Lifetime achievement award ===
- Emilio Estefan

=== Billboard Latin Music Hall of Fame ===
- Cachao
