= Ralph Mercado =

American music executive

- Born: Ralph Mercado Jr. September 29, 1941; Brooklyn, New York
- Died: March 10, 2009 (aged 67) Hackensack University Medical Center in Hackensack
- Occupation: promoter of Latin music
- Website: Claudia Brant Office Website (in English and Spanish)

Ralph Mercado Jr. (September 29, 1941 – March 10, 2009) was an American businessman and music promoter. He promoted Latin American music — Latin Jazz, Latin rock, merengue and salsa — and established a network of businesses that included promoting concerts, managing artists, Ritmo Mundo Musical (RMM) a record label the most important in the Latin industry during the late 1980s and throughout the 1990s, as well as a film company, nightclubs and restaurants.

== Early life ==
Mercado was born on September 29, 1941, in Brooklyn, New York to a father who was a Dominican dockworker and a Puerto Rican mother who was employed by a local factory. He told an interviewer that he was able to dance the merengue as soon as he learned how to walk.

In his early teens, he was "completely blown away" after seeing the Machito Orchestra perform at the Palladium, and he left "knowing I had to be involved in this music somehow, personally involved". Lacking any musical skill as a singer or performer, he started promoting "waistline parties", live music events in apartment building basements in which women were charged in proportion to their waist size, with thinner women charged less, and Mercado measuring at the door.

== Career ==
Shifting across the East River from his Brooklyn roots, Mercado started promoting Latin jazz at Manhattan clubs such as The Village Gate. These expanded into concerts at major venues with stars such as James Brown, who appeared with Latin acts such as Mongo Santamaría. He turned to managing performers, founding RMM Management in 1972, where his clients included Celia Cruz and Tito Puente, achieving acclaim as the biggest salsa manager in the United States by the 1970s. He developed new talent, such as La India and Marc Anthony, presenting salsa concerts at major venues across the country, from Madison Square Garden to the Hollywood Bowl.

Mercado started RMM Records in 1987, which had in excess of 130 artists performing across the Latin music spectrum, representing merengue, salsa, Latin jazz and Latin rock. He rode the expanding size and economic power of the nation's Hispanic population and a general interest in salsa music. Mercado brought in international groups and influences from Africa, Brazil and even Japan.

He achieved acclaim as the most successful promoter of salsa music, comparable to Berry Gordy's role in R&B. In 1991, Billboard magazine described him as "the entrepreneur who took salsa from New York to the world".

RMM Records was sold to the Universal Music Group in 2001 for about $26 million, including its Latin music catalog of as many as 400 master recordings, winning the rights over competitor Sony Discos. The sale came following financial difficulties exacerbated by the loss of a copyright infringement suit, in which composer Glenn Monroig won $7.7 million from a federal jury, which had grown to $11 million with interest, based on claims that RMM had modified one of his songs and used it without his permission or payment of royalties

Thereafter the sale of RMM, Ralph Mercado returned to promoting salsa concerts, on a global basis. He retained control of three music publishing firms, RMM Filmworks and Ralph Mercado Presents. He also owned, in whole or part, Manhattan clubs Babalu and the Latin Quarter, as well as the Conga Room in Los Angeles.

== Awards and recognition ==
In 1998, Mercado received the El Premio Billboard Lifetime Achievement Award. On September 28, 2008, Mercado was honored by Union City, New Jersey with the key to the city and a star on the Walk of Fame at Union City's Celia Cruz Park.

== Personal life ==
Mercado had lived in Cresskill and Hackensack, New Jersey, before moving to Cliffside Park, New Jersey, with his brothers John Ayala, Richard Ayala and Jorge Sanchez, and his sister Angelica Kreiger; he lived in Cliffside Park the rest of his life, although he also kept an apartment in Manhattan. He was a father to 4 daughters and one son.

He died on March 10, 2009, at age 67 at Hackensack University Medical Center in Hackensack from cancer.

== See also ==
- RMM Records & Video

== RMM labels ==
- SOHO Latino
- Sonero Discos
- RMM International
- TropiJazz
- Merengazo
- RMM Rocks
