= Billboard Latin Music Awards =

Latin music awards

- Current: 2026 Billboard Latin Music Awards
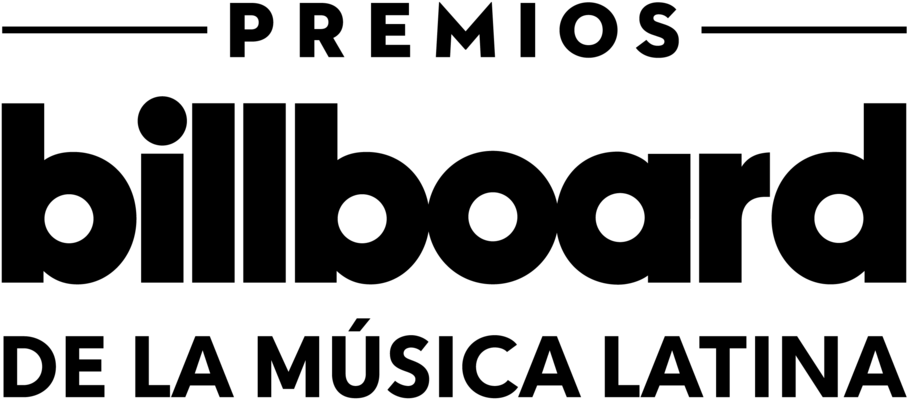
- Logo since 2019
- Native name: Premios Billboard de la Música Latina ("Spanish")
- Awarded for: Outstanding chart performance
- Country: United States
- Presented by: Billboard
- First award: May 18, 1994; 32 years ago
- Website: billboardevents.com

Television/radio coverage
- Network: Telemundo (1999–present)

The Billboard Latin Music Awards, or simply the Premios Billboard , are annual awards presented by Billboard magazine to recognize the most successful artists, songs, albums, and other achievements on its Latin music charts. Established in 1994 as an extension of the Billboard Music Awards, they are among the longest-running award ceremonies in the Latin music industry. Since 1999, the ceremony has been broadcast by Telemundo.

== History ==
The first award ceremony began in 1994 at the Intercontinental Hotel in Miami, Florida, under the name Latin Music Awards to "represent a broad cross-section of Latino talent, covering every music genre," and was then published in Billboard Magazine. The winners were selected based on points accumulated from Billboard's radio and retail charts and categorized into subcategories designed to reward artists, songs and albums over one year (between March 6, 1993, to March 5, 1994). The categories of the Latin music were: pop, tropical/salsa, regional Mexican, rap, rock and jazz. The first ceremony also introduced several special awards, decided by the Billboard editorial committee: the Latin Music Hall of Fame and Lifetime Achievement Award, to recognize an artist's career in the Latin music industry and to honor a musical personality who has largely contributed to the Latin music genre.

During the 1996 ceremony the Spirit of Hope Award was introduced as a special honor "in recognition of artists' extraordinary philanthropic and humanitarian contributions beyond their musical work." The 1997 ceremony was the first with hosts Daisy Fuentes and Herb Alpert. The 1999 awards show, hosted by Daisy Fuentes, was televised for the first time from the Fontainebleau Hotel in Miami Beach, Florida.

Since 2021, the Billboard Icon Award, initially presented exclusively during the Billboard Music Awards, has also been awarded during the Latin ceremony. In 2022, the ceremony introduced the Legend Award given to artists "whose contribution to music makes them a household name and who maintain a career that has withstood the test of time".

Bad Bunny is the most awarded artist, having won 61 awards, while Shakira is the most awarded female artist with 44 awards.

== Ceremonies ==
#	Year	Artist of the Year (Note: The Artist of the Year category was introduced in 2010. The Hot Latin Songs Artist of the Year and Top Latin Albums Artist of the Year awards are presented since 1994 and 1998, respectively.)	New Artist of the Year	Album of the Year (Note: The Album of the Year award was introduced in 2008. Each genre had their own Album of the Year category in 1994.)	Song of the Year (Note: Each genre had their own Song of the Year category from 1995 to 1998.)	Most wins	Host(s)	Venue	Ref.
1	1994	Los Fantasmas del Caribe (Note: Hot Latin Songs Artist of the Year winner.)	—N/a	Aries (Note: Pop Album of the Year); Luis Miguel; Mi Tierra (Note: Tropical/Salsa Album of the Year); Gloria Estefan; Selena Live! (Note: Regional Mexican Album of the Year); Selena	"Me Estoy Enamorando"; La Mafia	Gloria Estefan (3)		Intercontinental Hotel; Miami, Florida	
2	1995	Selena	—N/a	—N/a (Note: During this period, each genre had their own Album of the Year award with Male, Female, Group and New Artist categories.)	"Vida" (Note: Pop Song of the Year.); La Mafia "Viviré" (Note: Tropical/Salsa Song of the Year.); Juan Luis Guerra "Amor Prohibido" (Note: Regional Mexican Song of the Year.); Selena	Selena (4)		Intercontinental Hotel; Miami, Florida	
3	1996	Selena	—N/a	—N/a	"Vuélveme A Querer"; Cristian Castro "Te Conozco Bien"; Marc Anthony "Tú Sólo Tú"; Selena	Selena; Gloria Estefan (4)		Gusman Center for the Performing Arts; Miami, Florida	
4	1997	Enrique Iglesias	—N/a	—N/a	"Ámame Una Vez Más"; Amanda Miguel "Ironía"; Frankie Ruiz "El Príncipe"; Grupo Límite	Shakira (3)	Daisy Fuentes; Herb Alpert	Gusman Center for the Performing Arts; Miami, Florida	
5	1998	Luis Miguel (Note: Top Latin Albums Artist of the Year winner.); Enrique Iglesias	—N/a	—N/a	"Lo Mejor de Mí"; Cristian Castro "Y Hubo Alguien"; Marc Anthony "Ya Me Voy Para Siempre"; Los Temerarios	Luis Miguel; Marc Anthony (2)	Jon Seda	Fontainebleau Hotel; Miami Beach, Florida	
6	1999	Alejandro Fernández	—N/a	—N/a	"Por Mujeres Como Tú"; Pepe Aguilar	Elvis Crespo (4)	Daisy Fuentes Paul Rodriguez	Fontainebleau Hotel; Miami Beach, Florida	
7	2000	Elvis Crespo; Enrique Iglesias	—N/a	—N/a	"Loco"; Alejandro Fernández	Elvis Crespo; Alejandro Fernández; Los Tri-O (2)		Jackie Gleason Theater; Miami Beach, Florida	
8	2001	Son by Four (Note: Son by Four won the Top Latin Albums Artist of the Year and Hot Latin Songs Artist of the Year awards.)	—N/a	—N/a	"A Puro Dolor"; Son by Four	Son by Four (7)		Jackie Gleason Theater; Miami Beach, Florida	
9	2002	Marc Anthony; Cristian Castro	—N/a	—N/a	"Abrázame Muy Fuerte"; Juan Gabriel	Juan Gabriel (4)	Itatí Cantoral; Manolo Cardona	Jackie Gleason Theater; Miami Beach, Florida	
10	2003	Los Temerarios; Alexandre Pires	—N/a	—N/a	"Y Tú Te Vas"; Chayanne	Chayanne; Pilar Montenegro (3)	Roselyn Sánchez	Miami Arena; Miami, Florida	
11	2004	Celia Cruz; Conjunto Primavera	—N/a	—N/a	"Tal Vez"; Ricky Martin	Celia Cruz; Ricky Martin; Juanes (3)	Mauricio Islas; Candela Ferro	Miami Arena; Miami, Florida	
12	2005	Los Temerarios; Paulina Rubio	—N/a	—N/a	"Nada Valgo Sin Tu Amor"; Juanes	Paulina Rubio; Juanes; Juan Luis Guerra; Los Horóscopos de Durango (3)		Miami Arena; Miami, Florida	
13	2006	Daddy Yankee; Juanes	—N/a	—N/a	"La Tortura"; Shakira; Alejandro Sanz	Shakira (5)	Lupillo Rivera; Candela Ferro	Seminole Hard Rock Hotel & Casino; Hollywood, Florida	
14	2007	RBD; Wisin & Yandel	—N/a	—N/a	"Aliado del Tiempo"; Mariano Barba	Mariano Barba (4)		BankUnited Center; Coral Gables, Florida	
15	2008	Valentín Elizalde; Juan Luis Guerra	—N/a	El Cartel: The Big Boss; Daddy Yankee	"Mi Corazoncito"; Aventura	Juan Luis Guerra (3)	Aylin Mujica; Alan Tacher	Seminole Hard Rock Hotel & Casino; Hollywood, Florida	
16	2009	Vicente Fernández; Enrique Iglesias	—N/a	95/08; Enrique Iglesias	"Te Quiero"; Flex	Flex (8)	Aylin Mujica; Alan Tacher	BankUnited Center; Coral Gables, Florida	
17	2010	Aventura	Larry Hernández	The Last; Aventura	"El Amor"; Tito El Bambino	Aventura (9)	Aylin Mujica; Alan Tacher	José Miguel Agrelot Coliseum; San Juan, Puerto Rico	
18	2011	Enrique Iglesias	Prince Royce	Euphoria; Enrique Iglesias	"Cuando Me Enamoro"; Enrique Iglesias; Juan Luis Guerra	Enrique Iglesias (9)	Aylin Mujica; Rafael Amaya; Daniel Sarcos	BankUnited Center; Coral Gables, Florida	
19	2012	Prince Royce	La Adictiva	Prince Royce; Prince Royce	"Taboo"; Don Omar	Prince Royce; Don Omar (8)	Marlene Favela; Rafael Amaya	BankUnited Center; Coral Gables, Florida	
20	2013	Jenni Rivera	3BallMTY	Fórmula, Vol. 1 Romeo Santos	"Ai Se Eu Te Pego"; Michel Teló	Don Omar (10)	Ana Bárbara; Juan Soler; Daniel Sarcos	BankUnited Center; Coral Gables, Florida	
21	2014	Marc Anthony	Luis Coronel	3.0; Marc Anthony	"Vivir Mi Vida"; Marc Anthony	Marc Anthony (10)	Roselyn Sánchez; Raúl González; Laura Flores	BankUnited Center; Coral Gables, Florida	
22	2015	Romeo Santos	J Balvin	Fórmula, Vol. 2 Romeo Santos	"Bailando"; Enrique Iglesias; Descemer Bueno; Gente de Zona	Romeo Santos (10)	Gaby Espino; Pedro Fernández	BankUnited Center; Coral Gables, Florida	
23	2016	Romeo Santos	Los Plebes del Rancho	Los Dúo; Juan Gabriel	"El Perdón"; Nicky Jam; Enrique Iglesias	Nicky Jam; Enrique Iglesias (7)	Gaby Espino; Pedro Fernández	BankUnited Center; Coral Gables, Florida	
24	2017	Ricardo Arjona	CNCO	Los Dúo, Vol. 2 Juan Gabriel	"Hasta El Amanecer"; Nicky Jam	Nicky Jam (6)	Kate del Castillo; Carlos Ponce	Watsco Center; Coral Gables, Florida	
25	2018	Ozuna	Christian Nodal	Fénix; Nicky Jam	"Despacito"; Luis Fonsi; Daddy Yankee; Justin Bieber	Daddy Yankee (8)	Gaby Espino; Marco Antonio Regil	Mandalay Bay Events Center; Las Vegas, Nevada	
26	2019	Ozuna	Anuel AA	Odisea; Ozuna	"Te Boté"; Casper Mágico; Nio García; Darell; Nicky Jam; Ozuna; Bad Bunny	Ozuna (11)	Gaby Espino	Mandalay Bay Events Center; Las Vegas, Nevada	
27	2020	Bad Bunny	Sech	X 100PRE; Bad Bunny	"Con Calma"; Daddy Yankee; Snow	Daddy Yankee; Bad Bunny (7)	Gaby Espino; Nastassja Bolívar	BB&T Center; Sunrise, Florida	
28	2021	Bad Bunny	Myke Towers	YHLQMDLG; Bad Bunny	"Dakiti"; Bad Bunny; Jhay Cortez	Bad Bunny (10)	Gaby Espino	Watsco Center; Coral Gables, Florida	
29	2022	Bad Bunny	Ivan Cornejo	Un Verano Sin Ti; Bad Bunny	"Pepas"; Farruko	Bad Bunny (8)	Kate del Castillo; Jaime Camil	Watsco Center; Coral Gables, Florida	
30	2023	Bad Bunny	Peso Pluma	Mañana Será Bonito; Karol G	"Ella Baila Sola"; Eslabon Armado; Peso Pluma	Peso Pluma (8)	Jacqueline Bracamontes; Danilo Carrera	Watsco Center; Coral Gables, Florida	
31	2024	Bad Bunny	Xavi	Nadie Sabe Lo Que Va a Pasar Mañana; Bad Bunny	"Qlona"; Karol G Peso Pluma	Karol G (8)	Carmen Villalobos; Danilo Carrera	Fillmore Miami Beach; Miami Beach, Florida	
32	2025	Bad Bunny	Netón Vega	Debí Tirar Más Fotos; Bad Bunny	"DTMF"; Bad Bunny	Bad Bunny (11)	Elizabeth Gutiérrez; Javier Poza; Goyo	James L. Knight Center, Miami, Florida	
33	2026	Bad Bunny	Omar Courtz	Dinastía; Peso Pluma; Tito Double P	"Marlboro Rojo"; Fuerza Regida	Fuerza Regida (8)	Carmen Villalobos; Javier Poza	James L. Knight Center, Miami, Florida	

== Categories ==
The categories are listed according to Billboard's mention throughout the nominations; any changes in the name during the ceremonies are listed alongside.

=== Overall artist categories ===
- Artist of the Year (1994, 1999–present)
- New Artist of the Year (–present)
- Tour of the Year (–present)
- Crossover Artist of the Year (–present)
- Global 200 Latin Artist of the Year (2023–present)

=== Overall songs categories ===
- Hot Latin Song of the Year (1994, 1999–present)
- Hot Latin Song of the Year, Vocal Event (–present)
- Hot Latin Songs Artist of the Year (1994–present)
- Hot Latin Songs Artist of the Year, Male (2010–present)
- Hot Latin Songs Artist of the Year, Female (2010–present)
- Duo/Group Hot Latin Songs Artist of the Year (2010–present)
- Hot Latin Songs Label of the Year
- Hot Latin Songs Imprint of the Year (–2022)
- Airplay Song of the Year
- Airplay Label of the Year
- Airplay Imprint of the Year
- Sales Song of the Year (2023–present)
- Streaming Song of the Year (2023–present)
- Global 200 Latin Song of the Year (2023–present)

=== Overall albums categories ===
- Top Latin Album of the Year
- Top Latin Albums Artist of the Year, Duo/Group
- Top Latin Albums Artist of the Year, Male
- Top Latin Albums Artist of the Year, Female
- Top Latin Albums Label of the Year
- Top Latin Albums Imprint of the Year (–2022)

=== Latin Pop genre categories ===
- Latin Pop Artist of the Year
- Latin Pop Duo/Group of the Year
- Latin Pop Song of the Year
- Latin Pop Album of the Year
- Latin Pop Airplay Label of the Year
- Latin Pop Airplay Imprint of the Year
- Latin Pop Albums Label of the Year

=== Tropical genre categories ===
- Tropical Artist of the Year, Solo
- Tropical Artist of the Year, Duo or Group
- Tropical Song of the Year
- Tropical Album of the Year (–2022)
- Tropical Songs Airplay Label of the Year
- Tropical Albums Label of the Year

=== Regional Mexican categories ===
- Regional Mexican Artist of the Year, Solo
- Regional Mexican Artist of the Year, Duo or Group
- Regional Mexican Song of the Year
- Regional Mexican Album of the Year
- Regional Mexican Airplay Label of the Year
- Regional Mexican Albums Label of the Year

=== Latin Rhythm categories ===
- Latin Rhythm Artist of the Year, Solo
- Latin Rhythm Artist of the Year, Duo or Group
- Latin Rhythm Song of the Year
- Latin Rhythm Album of the Year
- Latin Rhythm Airplay Label of the Year
- Latin Rhythm Albums Label of the Year

=== Writers, producers and publishers categories ===
- Songwriter of the Year
- Producer of the Year
- Publisher of the Year
- Publishing Corporation of the Year

== Special honors ==
- Billboard Latin Music Lifetime Achievement Award
- Billboard Spirit of Hope Award
- Billboard Latin Music Hall of Fame

== See also ==
- Billboard Music Awards
