= RMM Records & Video =

American Latin music record label

RMM Records
- Parent company: Universal Music Group
- Founded: 1987
- Founder: Ralph Mercado
- Defunct: 2001
- Distributor(s): Sony Discos, Universal Music Enterprises
- Genre: Salsa, merengue, tropical, Latin jazz
- Country of origin: U.S.
- Location: New York City

RMM Records, also known as RMM Records & Video Corp, was an independent Latin music record label established in 1987 and based in New York City. The label was most active during the late 1980s and early 1990s and produced primarily salsa, Latin jazz, and merengue music. At its peak, RMM Records employed 55 staff members and had distribution deals in 42 cities around the world, occupying 9,000 square feet in two floors at its Soho headquarters. The label was established by Fania Records promoter Ralph Mercado, who had established RMM Management in 1972 as an artist management and booking agency, providing bookings for Latin artists Tito Puente, Celia Cruz, and Ray Barretto.

Artists who recorded for the label included Tito Puente, Celia Cruz, Tito Nieves, Oscar D'Leon, Eddie Palmieri, Cheo Feliciano, Ismael Miranda, José Alberto "El Canario", Tony Vega, Johnny Rivera, Ray Sepúlveda, Domingo Quiñones, Miles Peña, Orquesta Guayacan, Conjunto Clasico, Manny Manuel, the New York Band, Marc Anthony & La India. Record producers included Sergio George, Isidro Infante, and Humberto Ramirez.

== Empire and legacy ==
RMM filed for bankruptcy in November 2000, selling its assets to Universal Music Group. According to the NY Times, unpaid royalties, as well as a lawsuit settlement of $7.7 million to Glenn Monroig totaling over $11 million, plus interest, contributed to the end of RMM Records. On June 25, 2001, as part of the Chapter 11 bankruptcy sale, Universal Music Group (UMG) announced the acquisition of RMM’s assets.

== Founder and key staff ==
- Ralph Mercado Jr. (September 29, 1941 – March 10, 2009) was born in Brooklyn to a Puerto Rican mother and Dominican father. He entered the music business as a teenager, organizing parties and dances as president of a neighborhood social club. In the 1960s, he promoted R & B and soul artists like James Brown and paired them with Latin artists like Mongo Santamaria. In the 1980s-1990s, Mercado was a promoter of Latin Jazz, Latin rock, Merengue and Salsa. He established a network of businesses that promoted concerts, managed artists, and led to the foundation of the record label Ritmo Mundo Musical (RMM). Following the bankruptcy of RMM in 2000, Ralph Mercado returned to artist promotion.
- Debra A. Mercado, starting in the early 1990s, was RMM's National Director of Publicity, as well as overseeing international promotions generated by RMM International. She also was in charge of public relations for four other enterprises: RMM (Management), Ralph Mercado Presents, Caribbean Waves Music (ASCAP), and Crossing Borders Music Inc. (BMI).
- Damaris L Mercado, started her production career with her father while in her teens. She moved up the ranks from Production Assistant on concerts and music video projects traveling to different cities and countries and landing in Miami. There she worked out of the RMM Records office based in the Sony Discos headquarters as Manager of Production & Manufacturing eventually making her way back to New York City during the transition to Universal Music and culminating her position as Director of Global Production & Manufacturing.
- George Nenadich, who has been with Sirius XM Radio on the Caliente channel for the last 11 years as host of the very popular classic salsa program "Salsa Nation" on Caliente, every Saturday morning at 10:00am EST, as well as Rumbon (a 24Hour classic salsa channel launched by George Nenadich with the program La Jungla de Rumbon every Friday night at 7pm EST), became part of RMM Records in November 1988 as Promotions Director. One of the first employees of the label along with Martha Cancel (who was there prior and managed the everyday operations of the label at that time, including promotions).

== Familiar recordings ==
- Combinación Perfecta 1993
- Tropical Tribute to The Beatles 1996
- Recordando a Selena 1996
- En Vivo 1994 (recorded at Miami Arena, July 1993)
- European Explosion 1996 (recorded at Cannes, February 1995)

== Artists ==
- Tony Vega
- Van Lester
- Ray Sepúlveda
- Jesús Enríquez
- Guianko (also known as Yanko)
- Louie Ramirez
- Ray De La Paz
- 3-2 Get Funky
- Tito Puente
- Humberto Ramírez
- Cheo Feliciano
- Miles Peña
- Vanessa
- Isidro Infante & La Elite
- José Alberto "El Canario"
- Tito Nieves
- Celia Cruz
- Giovanny Hidalgo
- Orquesta de la Luz (Co-Distributed by BMG Victor Japan)
- Pete "El Conde" Rodríguez
- Guayacán Orquesta
- Michael Stuart
- Ismael Miranda
- Antonio Cartagena
- Corinne
- Kevin Ceballo
- Johnny Rivera
- Oscar D'León
- Luis Perico Ortíz
- Marc Anthony
- Manny Manuel
- Frankie Morales
- La India
- Domingo Quiñones
- Los Hermanos Moreno
- Ray Perdomo
- Grupo Caneo
- Eddie Palmieri
- The New York Band
- Johnny Almendra & Los Jovenes del Barrio
- Robert Avellanet
- Lisandro Mesa
- Descarga Boricua
- Limi-T 21
- Matecaña Orquesta
- Fernando Echavarría y La familia André
- Sin Limite
- Willy Rivera
- Charlie Sepulveda
- Rubén Sierra
- Yorman
- Yari Moré
- Jerry Galante
- Issac Delgado
- Dave Valentin
- Chamy Solano
- Grupo Raíces
- Puerto Rico All Stars
- Aramis Camilo
- Marcos Caminero
- Monchy
- Ravel
- Cuco Valoy
- Mickey Perfecto
- Jandy Feliz
- Tres Equis
- Aníbal Bravo
- Vivanativa
- La Misma Gente
- Paymasi
- César Flores
- July Mateo "Rasputín"
- Los Nietos y Sergio Hernández
- Aleo
- Wichy Camacho
- Angelito Villalona
- Grupo Heavy
- Alberto Barros
- Henry Rosario
- Michel Camilo
- Deddie Romero
- Jerry Medina
- Raul Paz
- Hilton Ruiz
- Fausto Rey
- Antonio Cabán Vale "El Topo"
- K'stalia y Los Salchichas
- He'Pepo
- Cali Alemán
- Aleo
- Checo Acosta
- Alto Voltaje
- Andrés Mercedes
- Azucarado
- Lucecita Benítez
- Celinés
- Cherito
- Chrissy
- Conexión Salsera
- El Combo Show
- Bobby Cruz
- Paquito D’Rivera
- DJ Karlos
- Freddie Gerardo
- Pancho Gómez
- Grupo ABC
- Grupo Mandarina
- José Octavio
- La Artillería
- La Orquesta Joven
- Latino Man
- Los Bravos
- Jesse Márquez
- Luisito Martí
- Johan Minaya
- Glen Monroig
- Nettai Tropical Jazz Big Band
- José Nogueras
- Nora
- Orchestra 7
- Mickey Perfecto
- Millie Puente
- Sandy Reyes
- Roc & Kato
- Kike Santana
- Super Cuban All Stars
- José Manuel Taveras
- Juan Pablo Torres
- Charlie Valens
- Wellington
- Yolanda Duke
- Familia RMM
- TropiJazz All-Stars
- Sergio George

== Labels ==
- SOHO Latino
- Sonero Discos
- RMM International
- TropiJazz
- Merengazo
- RMM Rocks

== See also ==
- List of record labels
- Ralph Mercado
