= Se Me Olvidó Otra Vez =

1974 song by Juan Gabriel

Single by Juan Gabriel

from the album Juan Gabriel con el Mariachi Vargas de Tecalitlán
- B-side: "Ases y Tercia de Reyes"
- Released: 1975
- Genre: Ranchera
- Length: 2:57
- Label: RCA
- Songwriter: Juan Gabriel

Music video
- "Se Me Olvidó Otra Vez" feat. Marco Antonio Solís on YouTube

"Se Me Olvidó Otra Vez" (transl. "I Forgot Once Again") is a song written and performed by Mexican singer-songwriter Juan Gabriel for his fourth studio album, Juan Gabriel con el Mariachi Vargas de Tecalitlán (1974). The song is a ranchera number that tells of an awaited but impossible reunion as the singer forgets he is the only one who loved the woman. It was released as the lead single from the album in 1975. The song has been listed as among Juan Gabriel's best songs according to music critics and was one of the best-performing singles of 1975 in Mexico. Gabriel has re-recorded the song twice, the first for his compilation album, Por Los Siglos (2001), and as a duet with fellow Mexican singer-songwriter Marco Antonio Solís on his 28th studio album, Los Dúo (2015).

In 1999, Mexican band Maná covered "Se Me Olvidó Otra Vez" on their second live album-, MTV Unplugged. Mana's rendition is performed as a reggae-tinged cumbia song. Their version was also received positive reactions from music critics and won the Latin Grammy Award for Best Pop Performance by a Duo or Group with Vocal in 2000. Commercially, Mana's cover peaked at numbers five and four on the Billboard Hot Latin Songs and Latin Pop Airplay charts in the United States, respectively.

== Background and composition ==
Since his debut album El Alma Joven (1971), Juan Gabriel immediately established himself as a popular Mexican singer. Juan Gabriel followed up with two albums, El Alma Joven II (1972) and El Alma Joven III (1973). In 1974, the artist released his album of mariachi songs Juan Gabriel con el Mariachi Vargas de Tecalitlán, in a collaboration with Vargas de Tecalitlán. As with the previous albums, Juan Gabriel composed all the tracks on the record including "Se Me Olvidó Otra Vez". A ranchera song, it tells of a "jilted lover waits in sad futility 'in the same town and with the same people, so that when you come back you won't find anything out of place'. But reunion is impossible: 'I'd forgotten once again that it was only me who loved you.'"

== Promotion and reception ==
"Se Me Olvidó Otra Vez" was released as the album's lead single in 1975 by RCA. Juan Gabriel performed the song live at the Palacio de Bellas Artes in 1990 and the performance was included on his first live album Juan Gabriel en el Palacio de Bellas Artes (1990). He re-recorded the track on his 2001 compilation album Por Los Siglos and again in 2015 with fellow Mexican singer-songwriter Marco Antonio Solís on Juan Gabriel's vocal duet album Los Dúo. According to the book Grandes Intérpretes del Bolero (2019) by Eladio Rodulfo Gonzalez, it has become one of the most-well known ranchera songs in the world. Univision listed the track as "one of the 13 songs you are obligated to hear". E! contributor Vanessa Odreman ranked "Se Me Olvidó Otra Vez" as Juan Gabriel's 10th best song. Antonieta Ramos of Heraldo USA cited the track as one of the 10 songs "for a heartbreak". The duet version was praised by AllMusic's Thom Jurek as a "lovely ballad".

== Formats and track listings ==
Mexican single

A1 "Se Me Olvidó Otra Vez" – 2:56

B1 "Ases Y Tercia De Reyes – 1:54

== Maná version ==
"Se Me Olvidó Otra Vez"

Single by Maná

from the album MTV Unplugged
- Released: 21 May 1999
- Recorded: 9 March 1999
- Venue: Miami Broadcast Center, Miami, Florida
- Genre: Cumbia
- Length: 3:43
- Label: WEA Latina
- Songwriter: Juan Gabriel
- Producers: Fher Olvera; Alex González

Maná singles chronology
"Como Te Extraño Corazón" (1998)	"Se Me Olvidó Otra Vez" (1999)	"Te Solte La Rienda" (1999)

In 1999, Mexican band Maná performed a rendition of "Se Me Olvidó Otra Vez" on their second live album MTV Unplugged. "Se Me Olvidó Otra Vez" is one of the three cover songs in the album along with "Te Solte La Rienda" by José Alfredo Jiménez and "Desapariciones" by Rubén Blades. The session was recorded at the Miami Broadcast Center in Florida on 24 March 1999. The record was produced by band members Fher Olvera and Alex González. Mana's cover of the song is performed as a "reggae-tinged" cumbia track. "Se Me Olvidó Otra Vez" was released as the album's lead single by WEA Latina on 21 May 1999.

Ricardo Camarena of La Opinión called the performance of the track "stupendous and rhythmic". The Houston Chronicle critic Ramiro Burr remarked that the band makes "raucous takes" of both "Se Me Olvidó Otra Vez" and "Te Solté la Rienda". A writer for Radio Programas del Perú listed Maná's rendition as one of the "10 Juan Gabriel Songs That Are Hits by Other Artists". At the inaugural Latin Grammy Awards in 2000, "Se Me Olvidó Otra Vez" won the Best Pop Performance by a Duo or Group with Vocal. It was recognized as one of the best-performing songs of the year at the ASCAP Latin Awards under the pop/ballad category in 2000. Commercially, Mana's rendition peaked at numbers five and four on the Billboard Hot Latin Songs and Latin Pop Airplay charts in the US, respectively.

=== Charts ===
==== Weekly charts ====
Chart performance for "Se Me Olvidó Otra Vez"
Chart (1999)	Peak position
US Hot Latin Songs (Billboard)	5
US Latin Pop Airplay (Billboard)	4

==== Year-end charts ====
1999 year-end chart performance for "Se Me Olvidó Otra Vez"
Chart (1999)	Position
US Hot Latin Songs (Billboard)	25
US Latin Pop Airplay (Billboard)	13

== See also ==
- List of number-one hits of 1975 (Mexico)
