= ¿Dónde Jugarán los Niños? =

¿Dónde jugarán los niños?

Studio album by Maná
- Released: October 27, 1992
- Recorded: 1991–1992
- Studios: Devon Shire (Hollywood); Ocean Way (Hollywood)
- Genres: Latin pop; pop rock
- Length: 54:24 (Standard Edition); 65:07 (Special Edition)
- Label: WEA Latina
- Producers: Fher Olvera; Alex González; Jose Quintana

Maná chronology
Falta Amor (1990)	¿Dónde jugarán los niños? (1992)	Maná en Vivo (1994)

Singles from ¿Dónde Jugarán los Niños?
- 1. "Oye Mi Amor" Released: September 7, 1992; 2. "De pies a cabeza" Released: January 11, 1993; 3. "Cómo te deseo" Released: March 15, 1993; 4. "Te lloré un río" Released: May 3, 1993; 5. "Como diablos" Released: June 5, 1993; 6. "¿Dónde jugarán los niños?" Released: July 8, 1993; 7. "Me vale" Released: August 3, 1993; 8. "Cachito" Released: September 13, 1993; 9. "La chula" Released: October 1, 1993; 10. "Vivir sin aire" Released: November 8, 1993

Professional ratings
Review scores
Source	Rating
AllMusic	3.5/5 stars

¿Dónde jugarán los niños? (Note: In this Spanish-language name the album title only keeps one capital letter at the beginning of the title.) (English: Where Will the Children Play?) is the third and fifth overall studio album by Mexican rock band Maná, released in 1992. The album was produced by singer Fher Olvera, drummer Alex González and José Quintana, with recording and engineering done by Benny Faccone. It includes hits like "Oye Mi Amor," "Cachito," "Vivir Sin Aire," "Te Lloré Un Rio," "De Pies A Cabeza" and "Como Te Deseo."

== Critical and commercial performance ==
¿Dónde jugarán los niños? was a critical and commercial success, peaking at number 4 on the Billboard Top Latin Albums chart, the band's first top-ten entry. Selling about 10 million copies worldwide, the album is the eighth best-selling Spanish-language album of all time and the best-selling Spanish-language rock album.

Music critic Jason Birchmeier of AllMusic rated the album four and a half stars out of five, stating, "the album is quite solid, maintaining a consistently strong standard of songwriting throughout, and the production is very professional, if perhaps a bit too glossy for those who like some grit in their music... it's one of those albums that warrants beginning-to-end listening, and it's had a lasting appeal over the years".

== Track listing ==
No.	Title	Writer(s)	Length
1.	"De Pies A Cabeza"	Fher Olvera; Alex González	4:35
2.	"Oye Mi Amor"	Olvera; González	4:32
3.	"Cachito"	Olvera; González	4:46
4.	"Vivir Sin Aire"	Olvera	4:51
5.	"¿Dónde Jugarán los Niños?"	Olvera; González	4:14
6.	"El Desierto"	Olvera; González	4:09
7.	"La Chula"	Olvera; González	4:07
8.	"Cómo Te Deseo"	Olvera	4:30
9.	"Te Lloré Un Río"	Olvera	4:52
10.	"Cómo Diablos"	Olvera	3:53
11.	"Huele A Tristeza"	Olvera	4:43
12.	"Me Vale"	González	4:32
Total length:			53:44

Special Edition Bonus Tracks
No.	Title	Writer(s)	Length
13.	"Cómo Te Deseo" (Remix)	Olvera	4:48
14.	"La Chula" (Remix)	Olvera; González	5:55

== Personnel ==
- Fher Olvera – lead vocal, electric & acoustic guitars & harmonica, choir
- César "Vampiro" López – electric & acoustic guitars
- Iván González – synthesizers, acoustic piano & hammond organ
- Juan Diego Calleros – bass guitar
- Alex González – drums, bass, percussion, main vocals on "Me Vale", choir

== Charts ==
=== Weekly charts ===
Chart (1992–1994)	Peak position
Argentine Albums (CAPIF)	6
US Top Latin Albums (Billboard)	4
US Latin Pop Albums (Billboard)	2

=== Monthly charts ===
Chart (1994)	Peak position
Chilean Albums (IFPI)	2

== Sales and certifications ==
Region	Certification	Certified units/sales
Argentina (CAPIF)	2× Platinum	120,000^{^}
Chile	8× Platinum	200,000
Mexico (AMPROFON)	2× Diamond	2,000,000^{‡}
Spain (Promusicae)	Platinum	100,000^{^}
United States (RIAA)	12× Platinum (Latin)	856,000
^{^} Shipments figures based on certification alone.^{‡} Sales+streaming figures based on certification alone.

== See also ==
- 1992 in Latin music
- List of best-selling Latin albums
- List of best-selling Latin albums in the United States
