= Pero Qué Necesidad =

Single by Juan Gabriel

from the album Gracias por Esperar
- Released: 3 June 1994
- Studio: Soundabout, Los Angeles, California
- Genre: Latin • pop
- Length: 5:54
- Label: Bertelsmann Music Group
- Songwriter(s): Juan Gabriel
- Producer(s): Gustavo Farias

Juan Gabriel singles chronology
"Fue un Placer Conocerte" (1992)	"Pero Qué Necesidad" (1994)	"Lentamente" (1994)

Music video
- "Pero Qué Necesidad" on YouTube

"Pero Qué Necesidad" (transl. "But What Is the Need?") is a song performed by Mexican singer-songwriter Juan Gabriel for his 21st studio album, Gracias por Esperar (1994). The song was produced by Gustavo Farias and written by Juan Gabriel. It is a Latin and pop song about loving people from around the world. The song was released as the album's lead single on 3 June 1994 by Bertelsmann Music Group (BMG). Upon its release, music critics were divided with some praising the tune while others were unimpressed. Retrospective reviews of the song have been more favorable with few critics listing it as among his best songs.

Juan Gabriel has re-recorded the song twice, the first for his compilation album, Por Los Siglos (2001), and as a duet with fellow Mexican singer Emmanuel on his 28th studio album, Los Dúo (2015). The accompanying music video features the artist with children and people of different races. "Pero Qué Necesidad" won the Lo Nuestro Award for Pop Song of the Year in 1995 and in the same category at the 1995 American Society of Composers, Authors and Publishers (ASCAP) Latin Awards. Commercially, it reached number one on the Billboard Hot Latin Songs in the United States. The song was covered by Puerto Rican singer Manny Manuel, whose version peaked at number four on the Billboard Tropical Airplay chart in the US.

== Background and composition ==
"Pero Qué Necesidad"
A 30-second sample of Juan Gabriel's song "Pero Qué Necesidad". Michele Johnson of Classic Rock compared it to Michael Jackson's song "Heal the World" (1992).

In 1986, Juan Gabriel released his 20th studio album, Pensamientos, and was succeeded by his compilation album, Debo Hacerlo (1988). Following the release of both albums, the artist went through a hiatus after legal disputes with his record label Bertelsmann Music Group (BMG). The dispute involved Juan Gabriel demanding rights of over 439 songs he published under the label to be ceded to the artist. Juan Gabriel would not record any new material for nearly eight years until BMG yielded to his demands.

On 21 October 1993, Ramiro Burr reported for the Austin American-Statesman that Juan Gabriel had finished wrapping up his next studio album, but it would not be released until the dispute between the artist and BMG had finished. Both parties came to an agreement on 27 May 1994 and Juan Gabriel renewed his contract with the label. Further details about the record were not revealed until a week later when the artist confirmed both the album's title of Gracias por Esperar and its release date. Recording took place at the Soundabout Studio in Los Angeles, California.

Juan Gabriel penned all the songs in the album with Gustavo Farias handling its production including "Pero Qué Necesidad". It is an up-tempo number with a Latin and pop beat in which the lyrics describes "loving people all over the world". It features a gospel-like choir in the background. Juan Gabriel re-recorded the track on his 2001 compilation album Por Los Siglos and again in 2015 with fellow Mexican singer Emmanuel on Juan Gabriel's vocal duet album Los Dúo as a soft rock cumbia.

== Promotion and reception ==
"Pero Qué Necesidad" was released as the album's lead single on 3 June 1994 by BMG. The song, which translates to "But What is the Need?", had played on Spanish-language radio stations for more than a month. An accompanying music video was directed by Pedro Torres and filmed in Miami and is a "brotherhood", featuring children and people of various races with the singer. The song was met with mixed reactions from music critics. The Newsday editor Ira Robbins called it an "engagingly ABBA-esque" song. Ramiro Burr, writing for the San Antonio Express-News, unfavorably compared the song to ABBA although he stated it has a "nice, melodic tune". Billboard's Paul Verna noted that the "gospel-accented backing vocals buttress" the "peppy" song. Mario Tarradell of the Miami Herald felt both the song and "Vienes o Voy" "fail miserably" as "dance-oriented, drum machine-happy numbers". In the review of Juan Gabriel's performance at the Special Events Center, Maria Cortés Gonzalez of El Paso Times found it to be an "interesting, but ineffective opening". The duet version of the song was lauded by AllMusic's Thom Jurek as "another golden moment here".

Retrospective reviews of the song have been positive. Darren Jamison of the SingersRoom ranked it number ten on Juan Gabriel's best-songs of all-time and noted despite the "serious theme", he found the song "catchy and upbeat, with a lively rhythm and a joyful melody". In a similar list, a Classic Rock reviewer ranked it number seven and stated that it "has a 90s pop sound, but the catchy beat can still be appreciated today". At the 7th Annual Lo Nuestro Awards in 1995, "Pero Qué Necesidad" won Pop Song of the Year. In the same year, Juan Gabriel earned the American Society of Composers, Authors and Publishers award for Pop/Contemporary Song of the Year. Commercially, the track topped the Billboard Hot Latin Songs chart in the United States, becoming his third number one single on the chart. It ended 1994 as the fourth best-performing Latin song of the year.

Puerto Rican singer Manny Manuel covered "Pero Qué Necesidad" on his debut studio album, El Rey de Corazónes (1994), as a merengue track. It was released as the album's lead single in 1994 by RMM Records. Manuel's version peaked at number five on the Billboard Tropical Airplay chart.

== Charts ==
=== Weekly charts ===
Chart performance for "Pero Qué Necesidad"
Chart (1994)	Peak position
US Hot Latin Songs (Billboard)	1

=== Year-end charts ===
1994 year-end chart performance for "Pero Qué Necesidad"
Chart (1994)	Position
US Hot Latin Songs (Billboard)	4

== See also ==
- List of number-one Billboard Hot Latin Tracks of 1994
