= List of number-one hits of 1975 (Mexico) =

This is a list of the songs that reached number one in Mexico in 1975, according to Núcleo Radio Mil as published in the Billboard and Notitas Musicales magazines.

== Chart history (Billboard) ==
Issue date	Song	Artist(s)	Label	Ref
January 4	"Mi plegaria"	César	Capitol	
January 25	"Mi plegaria"	César	Capitol	
February 1	"Mi plegaria"	César	Capitol	
February 8	"Mi plegaria"	César	Capitol	
February 15	"Mi plegaria"	César	Capitol	
February 22	"¿Quieres ser mi amante?"	Camilo Sesto	Ariola	
March 1	"¿Quieres ser mi amante?"	Camilo Sesto	Ariola	
March 8	"Te juro que te amo"	Los Terrícolas	Gamma	
March 15	"Te juro que te amo"	Los Terrícolas	Gamma	
March 22	"Te juro que te amo"	Los Terrícolas	Gamma	
April 19	"¿Quieres ser mi amante?"	Camilo Sesto	Ariola	
May 31	"Luna blanca"	Karina	Gamma	
June 7	"Se me olvidó otra vez"	Juan Gabriel	RCA	
June 14	"Se me olvidó otra vez"	Juan Gabriel	RCA	
June 21	"Se me olvidó otra vez"	Juan Gabriel	RCA	
June 28	"Se me olvidó otra vez"	Juan Gabriel	RCA	
July 19	"Se me olvidó otra vez"	Juan Gabriel	RCA	
August 2	"Llueve sobre mojado"	Camilo Sesto	Ariola	
August 16	"Llorarás"	Los Terrícolas	Gamma	
August 30	"Llorarás"	Los Terrícolas	Gamma	
September 13	"Llorarás"	Los Terrícolas	Gamma	
September 19	"El alacrán"	La Pandilla	Raff	
September 27	"El alacrán"	La Pandilla / Sonora Matancera	Raff / Orfeón	
October 10	"El alacrán"	La Pandilla / Sonora Matancera	Raff / Orfeón	
November 1	"¿Por qué nos dijimos adiós?" ("We Said Goodbye")	Grupo Yndio / Dave Maclean	Philips / RCA	

== Chart history (Record World) ==
Issue date	Song	Artist(s)	Ref.
March 8	"Los hombres no deben llorar"	King Clave	
April 5	"Los hombres no deben llorar"	King Clave	
April 12	"Los hombres no deben llorar"	King Clave	
June 21	"Mi corazón lloró"	King Clave	
June 28	"Mi corazón lloró"	King Clave	
September 6	"Mi corazón lloró"	King Clave	
October 11	"El alacrán"	La Pandilla	
November 8	"El alacrán"	La Pandilla	
November 22	"Te tendré que olvidar"	Rigo Tovar & el Conjunto Costa Azul	
December 6	"¿Por qué nos dijimos adiós?" ("We Said Goodbye")	Dave Maclean/Grupo Yndio	

== See also ==
- 1975 in music

== Sources ==
- Print editions of the Billboard and Record World magazines.
