= Por Los Siglos =

Por los Siglos

Greatest hits album by Juan Gabriel
- Released: October 9, 2001
- Recorded: 1984, 2000-2001
- Genre: Pop Latino, Mariachi, Regional
- Label: RCA
- Producer: Jorge Alvarez, Juan Tarodo

Juan Gabriel chronology
Abrázame Muy Fuerte (2000)	Por los Siglos (2001)	Inocente de Ti (2003)

Por los Siglos (English: For the Centuries) is a compilation album by Mexican singer Juan Gabriel released on October 9, 2001. This compilation album consists of ten of the most acclaimed hits re-recorded who celebrates his 30th career anniversary of music with new versions.

== Track listing ==
No.	Title	Length
1.	"Querida"	5:02
2.	"Te Sigo Amando"	2:58
3.	"Catalina"	4:22
4.	"Se Me Olvidó Otra Vez"	4:37
5.	"El Noa Noa"	5:42
6.	"Inocente Pobre Amigo"	4:20
7.	"Pero Qué Necesidad"	4:53
8.	"Siempre En Mi Mente"	3:21
9.	"La Diferencia"	2:36
10.	"Debo Hacerlo"	7:23

== Charts ==
Chart (2001)	Peak position
US Top Latin Albums (Billboard)	21
US Latin Pop Albums (Billboard)	10

== Sales and certifications ==
Region	Certification	Certified units/sales
Argentina (CAPIF)	Platinum	40,000^{^}
United States (RIAA)	Platinum (Latin)	100,000^{^}
^{^} Shipments figures based on certification alone.
