= Yndio =

Music band from México

Grupo Yndio is a Mexican band from Hermosillo, Sonora, founded in 1972, by some of the members of the dissolute band Los Pulpos.

The band is known for Spanish covers of English-language pop hits, but with a distinctive Grupero style. Their best known hits include "Melodía desencadenada", "Línea telefónica", "Dame un Beso y Dime Adios" and "Herida de amor", Spanish covers of "Unchained Melody" by The Righteous Brothers, "Telephone Line" by Electric Light Orchestra (ELO), Kiss and Say Goodbye by The Manhattans and "Love Hurts" by Nazareth respectively.

They had two number-one hits in Mexico:

- Their cover of "Él" was #1 for 4 weeks in 1973, alongside the original version by Los Strwck.
- Their Spanish-language cover of "Why Did We Say Goodbye?" (titled "¿Por qué nos dijimos adiós?") in 1975, alongside the original version by Dave Maclean.

== Discography ==
- Éxitos Eternos
- Sin Tu Amor (EP-1972)
  - 1 Sin Tu Amor
  - 2 Mamá Gorda
  - 3 Las Nubes Que Pasan (Díselo Tú)
  - 4 Amor de Padres
- Sin Tu Amor (1972)
  - 1. Sin Tu Amor
  - 2. No Me Dejes Amor
  - 3. El Tiempo
  - 4. Lo Que Te Puedo Ofrecer
  - 5. Noches y Días Perdidos
  - 6. Si Tu Me Dejas
  - 7. Es Para Tí, Es Para Mí
  - 8. Lo Que Siempre He Soñado
  - 9. Jamás Corazón
  - 10. Siempre Habra un Mañana
- Yndio MPHS-6114 (1975)
  - 1. El
  - 2. Cuando Salgo a los Campos
  - 3. Quedamos Como Amigos
  - 4. Las Nubes
  - 5. Desolacion
  - 6. Dulce Amor
  - 7. Siempre de Novios
  - 8. Como Te Extraño
  - 9. Perdoname Mi Amor
  - 10. Dejame
  - 11. Sufro Tu Ausencia
- Por Que Nos Dijimos Adios MPHS-6125 (1975)
  - 1. Por Que Nos Dijimos Adios
  - 2. Como Te Extraño
  - 3. La Que Era Ya No Es
  - 4. Cuando Salgo a los Campos
  - 5. Perdoname Mi Amor
  - 6. Dejame
  - 7. Quedamos Como Amigos
  - 8. Sufro Tu Ausencia
  - 9. Las Nubes
  - 10. Desolacion
- V Aniversario (1977)
  - 1. Eres Mi Mundo (You're My World)
  - 2. Amanecer
  - 3. Me Haces Falta... Te Necesito
  - 4. Ya Nunca Más
  - 5. Linea Telefónica (Telephone Line)
  - 6. Solos los Dos
  - 7. Entonces Me Dices Adiós
  - 8. Por Culpa de los Dos
  - 9. Gracias Amor
  - 10. Abrázame, Decídete
- Herida de Amor (1978)
  - 1. Herida de Amor
  - 2. Mi Gran Tristeza
  - 3. Adiós Amor
  - 4. Cuéntale
  - 5. Dame un Beso y Dime Adiós
  - 6. Por Qué Te Quiero
  - 7. Llorar, Llorar, Llorar
  - 8. Ven a Mí
  - 9. Nunca te Olvidaré
  - 10. Te lo Pido de Rodillas
- Cartas Marcadas (1980)
  - 1. No Nos Habalmos Más
  - 2. Adiós Amor
  - 3. Toda la Noche Contigo
  - 4. Cartas Marcadas
  - 5. Cuando Más Te Necesite
  - 6. Sueños Locos
  - 7. Déjame Ver
  - 8. Desde Que Te Perdí
  - 9. La Traicionera
  - 10. Te Necesite
- Ayudame (1981)
  - 1. Ayudame
  - 2. Elvira
  - 3. Mujer (Woman)
  - 4. Sencillamente una Canción
  - 5. Vuélveme a Querer
  - 6. Amor Agotado
  - 7. Delirio
  - 8. Ana
  - 9. Al Qué Tu Amas
  - 10. Si Me Dices Que Te Vas
- 10 Aniversario (1982)
  - 1. Algo
  - 2. No Debes Verme Llorar
  - 3. Soñando
  - 4. Ya No Voy A Llorar
  - 5. Amor
  - 6. Mejor Que Ayer
  - 7. Linda Mujer
  - 8. Brindo Por Ella
  - 9. Como Puedes
  - 10. Creo En Ti
- Temas de Amor (1983)
  - 1. Amor Indio
  - 2. Gema
  - 3. Solo
  - 4. Historia de un Amor
  - 5. Ojos Cafes
  - 6. Cancionero
  - 7. Cien Mujeres
  - 8. Sin Ti
  - 9. Loca Pasion
  - 10. Noche Callada
- Polkas y Cumbias (1984)
  - 1 Pazcola
  - 2 Siempre Hace Frío
  - 3 Los Pandeados
  - 4 La Huerfanita
  - 5 Este Amor
  - 6 La Rufalina
  - 7 El Porro de Pedrito
  - 8 Sonora Querida
  - 9 María Chuchena
  - 10 No Volveré
- Adiós (1985)
  - 1. Adiós
  - 2. Corazón
  - 3. Música Triste
  - 4. Eres Tú
  - 5. Ladrones
  - 6. Te Quedas o Te Vas
  - 7. Una Limosina de Amor
  - 8. No Quiero Vivir Sin Ti
  - 9. Desde Hoy
  - 10. Secreto Amor
  - 11. Cuando el Amor Se Acaba
  - 12. Antes de Que Te Vayas
- Polkas y Cumbias Vol. II (1986)
  - 1 El gringuito
  - 2 Cuatro caminos
  - 3 Mi corazón
  - 4 Mariposa Equivocada
  - 5 Bésame, Bésame
  - 6 La Indita y el Yndio
  - 7 Uno Más de los Mojados
  - 8 Es Amor
  - 9 Lamento del Mojado
  - 10 Todo Terminó
- Cada Vez Que Tú Te Vas (1986)
  - 1. Cada Vez Que Tú Te Vas
  - 2. Hasta Que a Mi Regresas
  - 3. Que Pena
  - 4. Lo Dices Tú o Lo Digo Yo (Say You, Say Me)
  - 5. Solo un Beso
  - 6. Cherish
  - 7. Eso Fue Ayer
  - 8. Grande Tan Grande
  - 9. Muñequita
  - 10. Bien Hecho Amor
- La Cancion de los Dos (1987)
  - 1. La Cancion de los Dos
  - 2. Sin Ella
  - 3. Yo Preferiria
  - 4. Lo Importante es Soñar
  - 5. ¿A Donde Vas Amor?
  - 6. Mi Vida Se Pinto de Gris
  - 7. Despecho
  - 8. Pobre de Mi Corazon
  - 9. Reina y Soñador
  - 10. Cariño Mio
- Yndio (1988)
  - 1. No Quiero Vivir Ya Sin Tu Amor
  - 2. Nos Pertenecemos
  - 3. Revisa Mi Equipaje
  - 4. Yo Comence la Broma
  - 5. Mala Cabeza
  - 6. Llorar
  - 7. Y Me Fui
  - 8. Fijate
  - 9. Al Final
  - 10. El Sabor de Mi Piel
- Triste Realidad (1990)
  - 1. Cariño Bandolero
  - 2. Red Wine
  - 3. Triste Realidad
  - 4. Por Que Dios Mío
  - 5. Reflections of My Life
  - 6. El Secreto
  - 7. Como da Vueltas la Vida
  - 8. No Me Vayas a Olvidar
  - 9. Dos Seres
  - 10 Just Because
- Tiernamente Desencadenado (1991)
  - 1. Melodía Desencadenada (Unchained Melody).
  - 2. Aprendiendo a Vivir Sin Tí
  - 3. Nuestro Amor Prohibido - Mi Adoración
  - 4. Oh! Niña (Oh! Girl!)
  - 5. De Rodillas Ante Tí
  - 6. Déjame Decirte
  - 7. Quisiera
  - 8. Que Triste Es Decir Adiós
  - 9. Desde Que Se Fué
  - 10. Entre la Lluvia y Mi Llorar (Between Rain and My Cry)
- Si Quieres Volver (1992)
  - 1 Si Quieres Volver
  - 2 Siempre en Mi Mente
  - 3 Tus Mentiras
  - 4 Ojos Claros
  - 5 El Fin del Mundo
  - 6 Hasta Entonces
  - 7 Angel Baby
  - 8 Juanito Galán
  - 9 Quiéreme Esta Noche
  - 10 Para Qué
- Lo Quieras o No (1994)
  - 1 Te Lo Pido de Rodillas
  - 2 Desde Que Te Perdí
  - 3 Lo Quieras o No
  - 4 Libre, Solterito y Sin Nadie
  - 5 No Puedo Evitar Enamorarme de Ti
  - 6 Muchas Veces Reí
  - 7 Al Sur de la Frontera
  - 8 Sólo
  - 9 Ahora Veo Claramente
  - 10 Vivir en Soledad
  - 11 Embrujo
  - 12 No Esperes Que Sea Tu Amigo
  - 13 Demasiado Romántica
  - 14 Al Sur de la Frontera (Versión Inglés)
  - 15 Sólo (Versión Larga) [Bonus Track]
- Reencuentro (1996)
  - 1 Te Amo Necesariamente
  - 2 Sueña, Dulce Nena
  - 3 Ámame
  - 4 Eres Tú
  - 5 Tus Ojos de Amor
  - 6 Te Quiero
  - 7 Cómo Ayudar a un Corazón Roto
  - 8 Si Te Vas
  - 9 Sólo Por Ti
  - 10 Acaríciame
  - 11 La Última Carta
  - 12 Dulce Amor
  - 13 Larga Distancia
  - 14 Huellas
- 12 Éxitos Rancheros y Cumbias (1998)
  - 1 Te He Prometido
  - 2 Amor de los Dos
  - 3 Mi Recuerdo
  - 4 El Duelo
  - 5 Tequila
  - 6 El Mandilón
  - 7 En Unos Días
  - 8 Calacas
  - 9 Aquella Que Se Mira
  - 10 La Gorda Pac-Man
  - 11 Borracho
  - 12 Fíjate
- El León Despertó (1998)
  - 1 Tatuaje
  - 2 Te Voy a Extrañar
  - 3 Ya Te Olvidé
  - 4 No Quiero Perder Tu Amor
  - 5 Pirata de Amor
  - 6 Te necesito
  - 7 Pensando en Esa Chica
  - 8 Lo Que Siento Por Ti
  - 9 Ya Lo Sé Que Tú Te Vas
  - 10 Las Puertas del Olvido
  - 11 Adiós Por Teléfono
- Con Amor Hacia el 2000 (1999)
  - 1 El Privilegio de Amar
  - 2 Solo Importas Tú
  - 3 Es Imposible
  - 4 Si Me Dieras Tu Amor
  - 5 La Suavecita
  - 6 Se Busca
  - 7 Año Viejo
  - 8 Suavecito, Suavecito
  - 9 Las Reumas
  - 10 Por Cuanto Me Lo Das
