= Los Strwck =

Mexican musical group founded in 1966

Los Strwck (pronounced "strook") is a Mexican musical group, founded in 1966. Led by Elbert Moguel, they originated from Guadalajara, Jalisco. Their biggest hits include the ballads "Él", "Dilo tú", "Quién" and "Recuerdo estudiantil". They mainly made rock and roll, ballad, and cumbia music.

The group was initially called "Fuego" ("Fire") and later "Los Extraños" ("The Strangers"), but they often met with difficulties because there were already other groups with those names. Because of this, Moguel came up with the notorious "Strwck" name after deciding that he wanted to create a name that had no vowel letters, and therefore a word that wouldn't exist in any language and that wasn't already the name of any other group. Their first album, "La Doctoriza", blends rock & roll music, cumbia, psychedelic rock and ballads. However, their later releases were more conventional ballads and cumbia songs.

The group was very popular in Mexico in the 1970s, and many of Moguel's compositions were hits as recorded by other groups.

== Members ==
- Elbert Moguel - lead vocals, guitar, composer
- Domingo Lomeli - bass guitar, drums
- Carlos Robles "El Fender" - guitar
- Miguel Flores - Keyboard
- Adalberto - drums
- Gustavo - keyboard
- Indalecio Anaya - Guitar, vocals

== Discography ==
=== La Doctoriza (LP) (1969) ===
1. La Doctoriza
2. Llora Tu Corazȯn
3. Dulce Pequeňa
4. Comunicame Tu Ritmo
5. Mater Nostra
6. W-A-Loo
7. Rompiendo Corazones
8. Dijiste No
9. Primera Vez
10. Nena Ven

=== La Suegra (LP) (1970) ===
1. La Suegra
2. Vanidosa
3. El Ausente
4. Pobre Reyna
5. Canción
6. Go-Go 70
7. Ni en Defensa Propia
8. Un Sueño
9. Parras
10. Él

=== Presentando Los Strwck (LP) (1974) (MM 5064) ===
1. Él
2. Cuidado Marinero
3. Los Doctoriza
4. Llora tu Corazon
5. La Fiebre Amarilla
6. Pobre Reyna
7. La Suegra
8. Cancion
9. Rompiendo Corazones
10. A La Luna
11. Dulce Pequeňa
12. Un Sueňo

=== Pintura Magica (Album) (1975) (MEL 100) ===
1. Dilo Tu
2. Cuanto Se Sufre
3. Linda Chiquilla
4. Pintura Magica
5. Yo Fui
6. Hoy Te Vas
7. Morenita
8. Alcobas Separadas
9. No Es Bonita
10. Mi Mañana

== Singles ==
- Rompiendo Corazones (1966)
- La Doctoriza (1969)
- Comunicame tu Ritmo (1969)
- Un Sueño (1970): composed by Moguel, it was later covered by La Tropa Loca, whose version was a number-one hit on the Mexican charts in 1973 for three weeks, and was also the most successful record of the year in that country.
- Go go 70 (1970)
- Pobre Reyna (1970)
- Él (1970): song composed by Elbert Moguel, number one hit in Mexico for 4 weeks alongside a cover by sonorense Grupo Yndio.
- La Suegra (1970)
- Canción (1970)
- El Ausente (1970)
- Ni en Defensa Propia (1970)
- Parras (1970)
- Vanidosa (1970)
- Cumbia Selene (1971)
- Adiós Amigo (1974)
- Dilo Tú (1974)
- Linda Chiquilla (1974)
- Jaliscumbia (1978)
- Quién (1979): one of their other best known songs
- Recuerdo Estudiantil (1979)
- Ingenua
- Los Ausentes

== See also ==
- List of number-one hits of 1973 (Mexico)
- Yndio
- Los Freddy's
- Los Yonic's
