= Lo Siento =

Lo Siento means "I'm sorry" in Spanish (literally "I feel it"). It may refer to:

- "Lo Siento" (Belinda Peregrín song), 2003
- "Lo Siento" (Super Junior song), 2018 single featuring Leslie Grace and Play-N-Skillz
- "Lo Siento", a song by Beret, 2018
- "Lo Siento", a song by the band formerly known as Sombrero Verde from their eponymous album, 1981
