= Debo Hacerlo =

Compilation album by Juan Gabriel
- Released: 1988
- Genre: Latin pop, Mariachi
- Label: RCA Records
- Producer: Chuck Anderson, Ryan Ulyate, Juan Gabriel

Juan Gabriel chronology
Para Ti... 14 Éxitos Originales (1988)	Debo Hacerlo (1988)	Juan Gabriel en El Palacio de Bellas Artes (1990)

Professional ratings
Review scores
Source	Rating
Allmusic	3/5 stars

Debo Hacerlo (Eng.: I Must Do It) is a compilation album by the Mexican singer-songwriter Juan Gabriel. It was released in 1988, and would be the last album with new songs released by the singer, until his album Gracias Por Esperar in 1994. The title song became the second number-one single for Gabriel in the Billboard Hot Latin Tracks chart and the album sold seven million copies worldwide, his second best selling album after Recuerdos II.

== Album history ==
Between 1986 and 1994, Mexican singer-songwriter Juan Gabriel refused to record any material because of a dispute with BMG over copyrights to his songs. He continued his career in live stage performances, setting attendance records throughout Latin America. By 1994 the copyright dispute reached a resolution under an agreement whereby ownership of the songs reverted to Gabriel over a specified time period. The record label selected eleven previously released tracks from Gabriel's catalog to release "Debo Hacerlo", the last new song recorded by the artist. This compilation album became a success, selling six million copies in Latin America and receiving a platinum certification in United States for shipments of 200,000 units.

The tracks included are: "Que Lástima", "Te lo Pido Por Favor" and "Sólo Sé Que Fué en Marzo" that were first released on the album Pensamientos. "Todo" and "No Vale la Pena", taken from the album Todo. "No Me Vuelvo a Enamorar" was recorded for the album Cosas de Enamorados. "Bésame" was included on Recuerdos II. The versions included on this release for the songs "No Tengo Dinero" (Nao Tenho Dinheiro), "Lily" (Vive) and "No Quiero" (Toma, Te Don la Vida) were recorded in Portuguese. The original versions can be found on the album El Alma Joven (1971) and El Alma Joven III (1973).

== Track listing ==
All tracks are written by Juan Gabriel.

No.	Title	Length
1.	"Debo Hacerlo"	9:42
2.	"Que Lástima"	3:59
3.	"No Me Vuelvo a Enamorar"	3:21
4.	"Toma, Te Don la Vida / No Quiero (Portuguese version)"	2:30
5.	"Sólo Sé Que Fué en Marzo"	4:03
6.	"Todo"	2:26
7.	"Nao Tenho Dinheiro / No Tengo Dinero (Portuguese version)"	3:06
8.	"Te Lo Pido por Favor"	3:40
9.	"Pensamientos"	8:55
10.	"Vive / Lily (Portuguese version)"	3:20
11.	"No Vale la Pena"	2:32
12.	"Bésame"	4:07

== Chart performance ==
Chart (1988)	Peak position
US Billboard Latin Pop Albums	6

== Sales and certifications ==
Region	Certification	Certified units/sales
United States (RIAA)	Platinum (Latin)	100,000^{^}
^{^} Shipments figures based on certification alone.
