= Te Solte La Rienda =

Single by Maná

from the album Maná MTV Unplugged
- Released: September 25, 1999
- Recorded: in Miami, Fl
- Genre: Latin/Rock en Español, Bolero
- Length: 4:05
- Label: WEA Latina
- Songwriter: José Alfredo Jiménez
- Producers: Fher Olvera & Alex González

Maná singles chronology
"Se Me Olvidó Otra Vez" (1999)	"Te Solte La Rienda" (1999)	"Cachito" (2000)

"Te Solte La Rienda" (I let go of the reins) is the second radio single release and sixth track from Maná's second live album, Maná MTV Unplugged, in 1999. "Te Solte La Rienda" is a song originally written in the ranchera style by Mexican singer-songwriter José Alfredo Jiménez. On the week of September 25, 1999, the song debuted at number twenty-nine on Billboard's Hot Latin Tracks chart. Just one week later, on October 2, 1999, it reach its peak at number twenty-one; it would stay at this position for a total of 4 weeks. In 2002, Lupillo Rivera performed a cover of the song which peaked at No. 12 on the Hot Latin Songs chart and No. 2 on the Regional Mexican Songs chart.

== Charts ==
Chart (1999)	Peak position
US Billboard Hot Latin Tracks	21
US Billboard Latin Pop Airplay	13
US Billboard Latin Regional Mexican Airplay	31
