= A Tiempo de Rock =

Studio album by Sombrero Verde (now Maná)
- Released: 1983
- Recorded: 1983
- Genre: Latin pop, rock en español
- Label: Ariola Records; Fonovisa

Sombrero Verde chronology
| Sombrero Verde (1981) | A Tiempo de Rock (1983) | Maná (1987) |

A Tiempo de Rock (English: Time to Rock) is the second album of the band Sombrero Verde (now Maná).

== Track listing ==
| # | Title | Time |
|---|---|---|
| 1 | Laura | 3:04 |
| 2 | Decidir | 2:57 |
| 3 | Hechos Nada Más | 4:03 |
| 4 | ...Y Nadie Abrió | 3:14 |
| 5 | Yo Te Amé | 3:50 |
| 6 | No Me Mires Así | 3:29 |
| 7 | Qué Linda Ciudad | 3:23 |
| 8 | Quédate | 2:52 |
| 9 | Me Voy al Mar | 2:26 |
| 10 | El Espejo | 4:30 |

- "No Me Mires Así" was used by in the Mexican rock band Maná, in their second album Falta Amor. It was the eleventh song on the track listing and extended.

== Personnel ==
- Fher Olvera – main vocals, acoustic guitar and electric guitar
- Gustavo Orozco – electric guitar
- Juan Diego Calleros – bass
- Ulises Calleros – electric guitar, choir
- Abraham Calleros – drums, percussion

=== Additional personnel ===
- Adolfo Diaz – saxophone
- Raúl Garduño – keyboards
- Memo Espinoza and José Villar – trumpets
