= List of number-one hits of 1973 (Mexico) =

This is a list of the songs that reached number one in Mexico in 1973, according to Billboard magazine with data provided by Radio Mil. Also included are the number-one songs according to the Record World magazine.

== Chart history (Billboard) ==
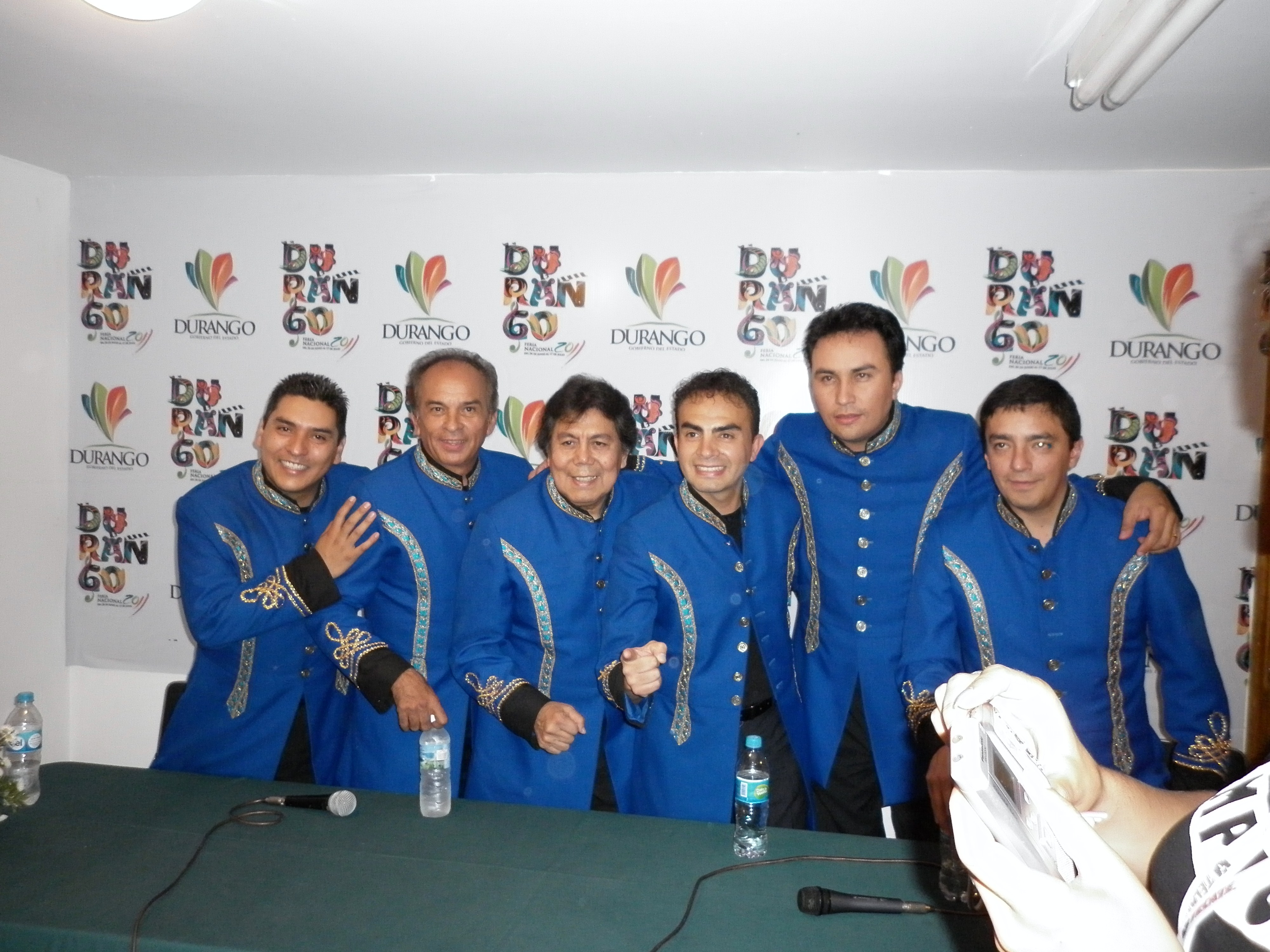
Mexican group La Tropa Loca had two number one-songs in 1973.

Issue date	Song	Artist(s)	Label	Ref.
January 27	"Río rebelde"	Julio Iglesias	Polydor	
February 3	"Río rebelde"	Julio Iglesias	Polydor	
February 24	"Río rebelde"	Julio Iglesias	Polydor	
March 10	"Río rebelde"	Julio Iglesias	Polydor	
March 17	"Río rebelde"	Julio Iglesias	Polydor	
March 24	"Volver, volver"	Vicente Fernández	CBS	
March 31	"Volver, volver"	Vicente Fernández	CBS	
April 7	"Volver, volver"	Vicente Fernández	CBS	
April 21	"Volver, volver"	Vicente Fernández	CBS	
May 5	"Te voy a enseñar a querer"	Manoella Torres	CBS	
May 12	"Te voy a enseñar a querer"	Manoella Torres	CBS	
May 26	"Te voy a enseñar a querer"	Manoella Torres	CBS	
June 2	"Detalles"	Roberto Carlos	CBS	
June 9	"Detalles"	Roberto Carlos	CBS	
June 23	"Detalles"	Roberto Carlos	CBS	
July 7	"Un sueño"	La Tropa Loca	Capitol	
July 14	"Un sueño"	La Tropa Loca	Capitol	
July 21	"Un sueño"	La Tropa Loca	Capitol	
August 4	"Forever and Ever"	Demis Roussos	Philips	
August 18	"Forever and Ever"	Demis Roussos	Philips	
September 1	"Forever and Ever"	Demis Roussos	Philips	
September 22	"Forever and Ever"	Demis Roussos	Philips	
October 6	"Déjenme llorar"	Los Freddy's	Peerless	
October 13	"Déjenme llorar"	Los Freddy's	Peerless	
October 20	"Engaño"	La Tropa Loca	Capitol	
October 27	"Él"	Los Strwck / Grupo Yndio	Son Art / Philips	
November 3	"Él"	Los Strwck / Grupo Yndio	Son Art / Philips	
November 10	"Él"	Los Strwck	Son Art	
November 17	"Él"	Los Strwck / Grupo Yndio	Son Art / Philips	
December 15	"Dieciséis años"	Julio Iglesias	Polydor	
December 22	"Dieciséis años"	Julio Iglesias	Polydor	

=== By country of origin ===
Number-one artists:

Country of origin	Number of artists	Artists
Mexico	5	Grupo Yndio
Mexico	5	La Tropa Loca
Mexico	5	Los Freddy's
Mexico	5	Los Strwck
Mexico	5	Vicente Fernández
Brazil	1	Roberto Carlos
Greece	1	Demis Roussos
Puerto Rico	1	Manoella Torres
Spain	1	Julio Iglesias

Number-one compositions (it denotes the country of origin of the song's composer[s]; in case the song is a cover of another one, the name of the original composition is provided in parentheses):

Country of origin	Number of compositions	Compositions
Mexico	6	"Déjenme llorar"
Mexico	6	"Él"
Mexico	6	"Engaño"
Mexico	6	"Te voy a enseñar a querer"
Mexico	6	"Un sueño"
Mexico	6	"Volver, volver"
Argentina	1	"Río rebelde"
Brazil	1	"Detalles" ("Detalhes")
France / Greece	1	"Forever and Ever"
Spain	1	"Dieciséis años"

== Chart history (Record World) ==
Issue date	Song	Artist(s)	Ref.
January 27	"Beautiful Sunday"	Daniel Boone	
March 3	"Volver, volver"	Vicente Fernández	
May 19	"Te voy a enseñar a querer"	Manoella Torres	
May 26	"Te voy a enseñar a querer"	Manoella Torres	
June 16	"Volver, volver"	Vicente Fernández	
June 30	"Detalles"	Roberto Carlos	
July 14	"Detalles"	Roberto Carlos	
August 18	"La montaña"	Roberto Carlos	
September 15	"La montaña"	Roberto Carlos	
October 13	"La montaña"	Roberto Carlos	
November 24	"Déjenme llorar"	Los Freddy's	

== See also ==
- 1973 in music

== Sources ==
- Print editions of the Billboard magazine from January 27 to December 22, 1973.
