= Cachito (Maná song) =

Single by Maná

from the album Maná MTV Unplugged
- B-side: "'¿Dónde Jugarán Los Niños?'"
- Released: February 12, 2000
- Recorded: in Miami, Fl
- Genre: Latin/Rock en Español
- Length: 5:19
- Label: WEA Latina
- Songwriters: Fher Olvera, Alex González
- Producers: Fher Olvera, Alex González

Maná singles chronology
"Te Solte La Rienda" (2000)	"Cachito" (2000)	"Corazón Espinado" (2000)

"Cachito" (A Bit) is the last radio single and fifth track from Maná's second live album, Maná MTV Unplugged (1999). On the week of February 12, 2000 the song debuted and reach at its highest peak at number twenty four on the U.S. Billboard Hot Latin Tracks. It would stayed for a total of 4 weeks.

"Cachito"

Single by Maná

from the album ¿Dónde Jugarán Los Niños?
- Released: 1992
- Recorded: in Devon Shire Studios and Ocean Way Recording, Hollywood, CA
- Genre: Latin/Rock en Español
- Length: 4:46
- Label: WEA Latina
- Songwriters: Fher Olvera, Alex González
- Producers: Fher Olvera, Alex González

Maná singles chronology
"Oye Mi Amor" (1992)	"Cachito" (1992)	"Vivir Sin Aire" (1992)

== Charts ==
Chart (2003)	Peak position
US Billboard Hot Latin Tracks	24
US Billboard Latin Pop Airplay	9
