= Volver, Volver =

Mexican song

Volver, Volver (Come Back, Come Back) is a Mexican ranchera song in Spanish, written in 1972 by Fernando Z. Maldonado and popularized by Vicente Fernández in 1973. It has been covered by the artists Ry Cooder and Nana Mouskouri. It is about lost love. "Volver, volver" means “to go back, to go back”.

The song is sung by Harry Dean Stanton in the 2017 movie Lucky.

== Meaning ==
The lyrics tell of the singer’s broken hearted passion to return to a lover from whom they have parted in the past. Volver means return in Spanish.

== Chart performance ==
Chart (1973)	Peak position
Mexico (Billboard Hits of the World)	1

== See also ==
- List of number-one hits of 1973 (Mexico)
