= Juan Gabriel con el Mariachi Vargas de Tecalitlán =

Juan Gabriel Con El Mariachi Vargas De Tecalitlan

Studio album by Juan Gabriel
- Released: October 20, 1974
- Recorded: 1973–1974
- Genre: Mariachi
- Label: RCA Records Sony Music Mexico (Re-Mastered Edition)

Juan Gabriel chronology
El Alma Joven Vol.III (1973)	Juan Gabriel Con El Mariachi Vargas De Tecalitlan (1974)	10 Éxitos de Juan Gabriel (1975)

Juan Gabriel Con El Mariachi Vargas De Tecalitlan is the fourth studio album by Mexican singer-songwriter Juan Gabriel with music performed by Vargas de Tecalitlán. It was released in 1974. In 1977, Juan Gabriel made his film debut in Nobleza Ranchera alongside superstar Mexican actresses Sara García and Verónica Castro. Songs from this album were featured in this film.

== Track listing ==
No.	Title	Length
1.	"Ases y Tercia de Reyes"	1:52
2.	"Lágrimas y Lluvia"	2:59
3.	"Se Me Olvidó Otra Vez"	2:55
4.	"Esta Noche Voy a Verla"	2:35
5.	"La Muerte del Palomo"	3:27
6.	"Estoy Enamorado de Ti"	3:15
7.	"Que Chasco Me Llevé"	2:24
8.	"Que Sea Mi Condena"	3:10
9.	"Si Dios Me Ayuda"	3:01
10.	"¿Dónde Andará?"	1:44
11.	"Mañana Te Acordarás"	3:55
