= 10 Éxitos de Juan Gabriel =

10 Exitos de Juan Gabriel

Studio album by Juan Gabriel
- Released: January 1, 1975
- Recorded: 1974
- Genre: Latin pop
- Length: 31:03
- Label: RCA Records

Juan Gabriel chronology
Juan Gabriel con el Mariachi Vargas De Tecalitlán (1974)	10 Exitos de Juan Gabriel (1975)	A Mi Guitarra (1975)

10 Exitos de Juan Gabriel (English: 10 Hits of Juan Gabriel) is the fifth studio album by Juan Gabriel, originally released on January 1, 1975 and re-released on April 15, 1991.

== Track listing ==
All tracks are written by Juan Gabriel.

No.	Title	Length
1.	"Iremos de la Mano"	3:25
2.	"Lo Nuestro Fue Un Sueño"	3:07
3.	"No Se Ha Dado Cuenta"	2:23
4.	"Que Vuelvas"	4:11
5.	"Me Gusta Estar Contigo"	2:03
6.	"En Cualquier Parte del Mundo"	3:53
7.	"Gracias Por Volver"	2:26
8.	"Por Creer En Ti"	2:01
9.	"Cuando Me Vaya de Tu Lado"	3:06
10.	"Tu Sigues Siendo el Mismo"	4:24
