= Maná (album) =

Studio album by Maná
- Released: 12 May 1987
- Recorded: 1987
- Studio: Lagab (Mexico City)
- Labels: A&M; Polygram
- Producers: Guillermo Gil; Associate Producer; Juan Carlos Alfonso

Maná chronology
Maná (1987)	Falta Amor (1990)

Sombrero Verde chronology
A Tiempo de Rock (1983)	Maná (1987)

Singles from Maná
- 1. "Robot" Released: March 30, 1987; 2. "Mentirosa" Released: July 13, 1987; 3. "Queremos Paz" Released: Angust 31, 1987

Maná is the self-titled debut album by the Latin American Mexican rock band Maná, released in 1987 on PolyGram. It included 10 songs, including "Robot", "México", and "Queremos Paz". Created by lead vocalist Fher Olvera, the band became known as Maná in 1986, following the departure of two members of Sombrero Verde, their previous incarnation, and were soon joined by drummer Alex González.

== Track listing ==
No.	Title	Writer(s)	Length
1.	"Robot"	Fher Olvera	3:15
2.	"Mentirosa"	Olvera; Alex González	3:48
3.	"Bailando"	Olvera	3:38
4.	"México"	Olvera	2:51
5.	"Entré Por la Ventana"	Olvera; González	3:25
6.	"Cayó Mi Nave"	Olvera	4:12
7.	"Mueve Tus Caderas"	Olvera; González	3:55
8.	"En la Playa"	Olvera	3:48
9.	"Lentes de Sol"	Olvera	3:18
10.	"Queremos Paz"	Olvera	3:04

== Re-releases ==
Year	Title	Info
1995	Maná: La Historia de Rock en Español	First re-release
2001	Sólo Para Fanáticos	With Pablo Milanés
2001	Combinaciones Premiadas	With Los Enanitos Verdes
2007	Crónicas: Maná	Reissue
2010	Maná	Latest re-release

== Personnel ==
- Fernando Olvera – main vocals, acoustic guitar, harmonies, backing vocals
- Alex González – drums, percussion, backing vocals
- Juan Diego Calleros – bass
- Ulises Calleros – electric guitar, acoustic guitar, backing vocals

=== Additional Personnel ===
- Diego Herrera – saxophone on "En la Playa"
- Juan Carlos Toribio – keyboards / synthesizers
- Guillermo Lopez and Carlos "Super Ratón" Garcia – trumpets
- Beto Dominguez – percussion
- Sergio Wibo – guitar solo on "Bailando"
- Nando Hernández – synthesizer bass on "Robot"
- Gabriela Aguirre and Sheila Ríos – backing vocals
