= El Alma Joven III =

El Alma Joven Vol.III

Studio album by Juan Gabriel
- Released: August 4, 1973
- Recorded: 1973
- Genre: Latin pop
- Label: RCA Records

Juan Gabriel chronology
El Alma Joven Vol.II (1972)	El Alma Joven Vol.III (1973)	Juan Gabriel con el Mariachi Vargas De Tecalitlán (1974)

El Alma Joven Vol.III (English: The Young Soul Volume III) is the third studio album by Juan Gabriel, released in 1973. The album was recorded in Paris, France with the Paul Mauriat Orchestra.

== Track listing ==
No.	Title	Length
1.	"Que Divino Amor"	2:14
2.	"Solo Fue Un Sueño"	2:58
3.	"Ah, Ya Se (Si la Miro Mañana)"	2:37
4.	"Volvamos Otra Vez"	3:13
5.	"Esta Rosa Roja"	3:13
6.	"En Esta Primavera"	3:20
7.	"Nada Ni Nadie"	2:31
8.	"Ya No Puede Ser Posible"	2:31
9.	"No Quiero"	2:29
10.	"Corazón Sediento"	3:06
