= Sombrero Verde (album) =

Studio album by Sombrero Verde (now Maná)
- Released: 1981
- Recorded: 1981
- Genres: Latin pop, rock en español
- Label: Ariola Records
- Producer: Ricardo Ochoa

Sombrero Verde chronology
Sombrero Verde (1981)	A Tiempo de Rock (1983)

Sombrero Verde is the first album of the band Sombrero Verde (now Maná).

== Track listing ==
#	Title	Time
1.	Nunca Más	2:59
2.	Professor	4:18
3.	Kitty Poo	3:40
4.	Long Time (Song in English)	3:03
5.	Ascensor	3:20
6.	Despiértate	3:49
7.	U-La-La-La	3:57
8.	Concierto	3:30
9.	Lo Siento	3:33
10.	Vampiro	3:34

== Personnel ==
- Fher Olvera – lead vocals, acoustic guitar and electric guitar
- Gustavo Orozco – electric guitar
- Juan Diego Calleros – bass
- Ulises Calleros – electric guitar, choir
- Abraham Calleros – drums, percussion

=== Additional personnel ===
- Adolfo Diaz – saxophone
- Raúl Garduño – keyboards
- Memo Espinoza and José Villar – trumpets
