= Debo Hacerlo (song) =

Single by Juan Gabriel

from the album Debo Hacerlo
- B-side: "Pensamientos"
- Released: 1987
- Recorded: 1987
- Genre: Latin pop · Disco
- Length: 9:42
- Label: RCA Ariola
- Songwriter: Juan Gabriel
- Producer: Juan Gabriel · Ryan Ulyate

Juan Gabriel singles chronology
| "Hasta Que Te Conocí" (1987) | "Debo Hacerlo" (1987) | "Sólo Sé Que Fué en Marzo" (1988) |

"Debo Hacerlo" ("I Must Do It") is a dance song written, produced and performed by Mexican singer-songwriter Juan Gabriel. It was released in 1987 as the first single from his compilation album of the same title (1988). This song became the last original song recorded by Gabriel, until 1994, due to a copyright dispute with BMG over his repertoire, and was later covered by Ana Gabriel, Nydia Rojas, Pandora, José Octavio and Aleks Syntek.

== Background ==
"Debo Hacerlo" became the last original song recorded by Mexican singer-songwriter Juan Gabriel, due to his refusal to record any new material, since the dispute with BMG over copyrights to his songs was unresolved. Moreover, upon listening to "Debo Hacerlo" one can hear the same intro from his previous single, "Hasta que te Conoci", and in fact, some of the chord progression from "Hasta" carries onto "Debo Hacerlo". To release this song, the record label selected eleven previously released tracks from Gabriel's catalog. Gabriel did a special appearance in the 'Festival Acapulco 1988' to present the song. The song became a success in Mexico where it spent seven months within the Top 5, leading to the parent album to sell six million copies in Latin America and receiving a platinum certification in United States for sales of 100,000 units.

== Chart performance and cover versions ==
The song debuted on the Billboard Hot Latin Tracks chart at number 30 on 26 December 1987 and climbed to the top ten five weeks later. It reached the top position of the chart on 16 April 1988, replacing "Ay Amor" by Mexican singer-songwriter Ana Gabriel and being replaced one week later by Los Bukis' "Y Ahora Te Vas". This song became Gabriel's second number-one hit in the Hot Latin Tracks chart as a lead performer, after "Yo No Sé Qué Me Pasó" in 1986 and his fourth number-one single as a songwriter. It ended 1988 as the fifth best-performing single of the year.

"Debo Hacerlo" has been covered by several artists. Mexican trio Pandora recorded a cover version of the song in a medley along with "Caray", "Querida" and "Me Nace del Corazón", they released this version as the second single from their Grammy nominated album ... Con Amor Eterno (1991). This medley peaked at number three in the Hot Latin Tracks chart. A flamenco/house version was recorded by Ana Gabriel in 2005 on her covers album Dos Amores, Un Amante. Mexican singer-songwriter Aleks Syntek recorded another version of the song on the Tribute album Amo al Divo de Juárez. Nydia Rojas, Will Veloz, Pepe González, Mariachi Arriba Juárez and José Octavio also did their version of the track. Juan Gabriel re-recorded "Debo Hacerlo" to celebrate his 30th career anniversary, on his 2001 album Por Los Siglos.

== Other uses ==
In 2015 Belarusian rhythmic gymnast Melitina Staniouta for her ribbon routine is using a shortened version of the song with vocals by Ana Gabriel.

== Track listing ==
- Vinyl Maxi-Single
1. "Debo Hacerlo"
2. "Pensamientos"

== See also ==
- List of number-one Billboard Top Latin Songs from the 1980s
