= Maná en Vivo =

Maná en vivo

Live album by Maná
- Released: December 13, 1994
- Recorded: August – September 1994
- Length: 53:43 (disc 1); 50:10 (disc 2)
- Label: WEA Latina
- Producer: Fher Olvera; Alex González

Maná chronology
¿Dónde Jugarán Los Niños? (1992)	Maná en vivo (1994)	Cuando los Ángeles Lloran (1995)

Professional ratings
Review scores
Source	Rating
AllMusic	3/5 stars

Maná en Vivo (in English: Maná Live) is the first live album (and seventh overall) released by the Mexican rock band Maná. After Iván González and César López left the group, Fher Olvera, Alex González, and Juan Calleros continued to perform as a trio. They recorded Maná en Vivo in August and September 1994 during their ¿Dónde Jugarán Los Niños? World Tour. The double CD includes material from concerts at the Universal Amphitheatre in Los Angeles; the Sports Arena in San Diego; the Aragon Ballroom in Chicago; the Teatro Gran Rex in Buenos Aires, Argentina; the Estadio de Chile in Santiago, Chile; and the Sala Estandard in Barcelona, Spain. Olvera, González, and Calleros were joined by Carlos Orozco on guitar, Sheila Ríos on vocals, and Juan Carlos Toribio on keyboards.

== Track listing ==
=== CD1 ===
No.	Title	Length
1.	"De Pies a Cabeza"	5:40
2.	"Oye Mi Amor"	4:54
3.	"Refrigerador"	3:59
4.	"¿Dónde Jugarán los Niños?"	6:30
5.	"Soledad"	6:12
6.	"Huele a Tristeza"	7:12
7.	"Te Lloré Un Río"	6:34
8.	"Estoy Agotado"	4:16
9.	"Perdido En Un Barco"	4:19
10.	"Buscándola"	4:11

¿Dónde Jugarán Los Niños? Tour 1993–1995
- World tour by Maná
- Associated album: ¿Dónde Jugarán Los Niños?
- Start date: 1993
- End date: 1995
- Legs: 11

Maná concert chronology
- ¿Dónde Jugarán Los Niños? Tour 1993–1995; Sueños Líquidos Tour 1998

=== CD2 ===
No.	Title	Length
1.	"La Chula"	4:32
2.	"El Rey"	4:39
3.	"Como Diablos"	8:06
4.	"Me Vale"	6:16
5.	"Rayando el Sol"	7:47
6.	"Como Te Deseo"	9:21
7.	"La Puerta Azul"	3:38
8.	"Vivir Sin Aire"	5:55

== Personnel ==
- Fher Olvera – main vocals, acoustic guitar, electric guitar, harmonics, and group member
- Alex González – main vocals, drums, electric percussions, and group member
- Juan Diego Calleros – bass and group member

== Additional personnel ==
- Gustavo Orozco – guitar
- Juan Carlos Toribio – keyboards
- Sheila Rios – background vocals
- Mercedes Granados – violin
- Juan A. Mira – violin
- Jose Saufor – violin
- Pedro Santa Maria – violin
- Silvia Villamor – viola
- José Alberto Lopez – viola
- Ignacio Lopez – cello
- Oscar Agalberto – cello

== Charts ==
Chart (1992)	Peak position
U.S. Billboard Top Latin Albums	7
U.S. Billboard Latin Pop Albums	4

== Sales and certifications ==
Region	Certification	Certified units/sales
Argentina (CAPIF)	Gold	30,000^{^}
Mexico	—	100,000
^{^} Shipments figures based on certification alone.
