= El Alma Joven II =

El Alma Joven Vol.II

Studio album by Juan Gabriel
- Released: 1972
- Recorded: 1972
- Genre: Latin pop
- Label: RCA Records

Juan Gabriel chronology
El Alma Joven... (1971)	El Alma Joven Vol.II (1972)	El Alma Joven Vol.III (1973)

Juan Gabriel (A.K.A El Alma Joven Vol. II) (English: The Young Soul Volume II) is the second studio album by Juan Gabriel, released in 1972.

== Track listing ==
No.	Title	Length
1.	"Será Mañana"	2:59
2.	"No Puedo Olvidar"	3:47
3.	"Yo No Digo Que Te Amo"	3:10
4.	"¿Por qué Fue Que Te Amé?"	3:45
5.	"Rosenda"	3:06
6.	"(Arcelia) Solo se que Fue en Marzo"	2:48
7.	"Uno, Dos y Tres (Y Me Dás un Beso)"	3:02
8.	"Tu Que Fuiste"	3:31
9.	"Aquella Melodía"	2:47
10.	"No Quiero Que Me Dejes"	3:38
11.	"Te Busco, Te Extraño"	2:33
