= Falta Amor (album) =

Studio album by Maná
- Released: July 3, 1990
- Recorded: 1990
- Studio: Lagab (Mexico City)
- Genre: Pop rock
- Length: 45:29
- Label: WEA Latina
- Producers: Fher Olvera; Alex González; Guillermo Gil

Maná chronology
Maná (1987)	Falta Amor (1990)	¿Dónde Jugarán los Niños? (1992)

Singles from Falta Amor
- 1. "Rayando el Sol" Released: May 28, 1990; 2. "Gitana" Released: August 13, 1990; 3. "Buscándola" Released: November 12, 1990; 4. "Estoy Agotado" Released: February 4, 1991; 5. "Perdido En Un Barco" Released: April 1, 1991

Falta Amor (English: Love Is Missing) is the fourth studio album by Latin American Mexican rock band Maná, their second under the name Maná, and their first under the WEA Latina label. The album had sold almost 500,000 copies worldwide by 1993, and following their 1994 breakthrough in the United States, Falta Amor had sold 186,000 copies in the country by 2011. Includes the well-known single Rayando El Sol.

Falta Amor is also the last album featuring Ulises Calleros as guitarist, who would take over the reins of the band's management from that point on.

The success of this work came at a key moment for the band, as the spirit of its members had fallen after the poor reception of their previous publications and even their vocalist, Fher Olvera, had begun to consider leaving the musical group.

== Reception ==
Professional ratings
Review scores
Source	Rating
AllMusic	2/5 stars

Jason Birchmeier of AllMusic stated that "Falta Amor is the Mexican pop/rock band's least noteworthy album by far – musically, at least – but it still has its moments".

== Track listing ==
No.	Title	Writer(s)	Length
1.	"Gitana"	Fher Olvera; Alex González	4:17
2.	"Refrigerador"	Olvera	3:50
3.	"Rayando El Sol"	Olvera; González	4:14
4.	"Buscándola"	Olvera; González	4:09
5.	"Soledad"	Olvera	4:38
6.	"Falta Amor" (featuring Alejandro Lora)	Olvera	4:15
7.	"Estoy Agotado"	Olvera; González	3:54
8.	"Perdido en un Barco"	Olvera; González	4:15
9.	"La Puerta Azul"	Olvera; González	3:14
10.	"Maeo"	Olvera; González	3:58
11.	"No Me Mires Así"	Olvera	4:45

== Personnel ==
Maná

- Fher Olvera – lead vocals, acoustic guitar, harmonica, backing vocals
- Alex González – drums, percussion, lead vocals on "Buscándola", backing vocals
- Juan Diego Calleros – bass
- Ulises Calleros – electric guitar, acoustic guitar, backing vocals
- Iván González – synthesizers, acoustic piano and hammond organ

== Charts ==
Chart (1994)	Peak position
US Latin Pop Albums (Billboard)	13
US Top Latin Albums (Billboard)	27
