= Los Freddy's =

Mexican musical group

Los Freddy's (or Los Freddys) were a Mexican musical group, founded in 1962 in Guadalajara, Jalisco.

The group was one of the most popular Mexican ensembles of the 1960s and 1970s. Early in their careers, the group earned popularity by playing cover songs of popular English-language songs (such as Sam the Sham & the Pharaohs' "Wooly Bully" and The Beatles' "Penny Lane") that were translated into Spanish; beginning in the 70s, the band established themselves throughout Latin America as one of the top bands with a string of successful original slow ballads and grupera songs. They were nominated for a Grammy Award in 1989. In 1994, lead singer Arturo Cisneros left the band to pursue a solo career and now performs under his own name. The remaining band members continue together with a new lead singer. A compilation album of the group's 30 greatest hits released in 2003 produced a resurgence of the group's popularity, earning the album a spot on the Billboard charts in the United States.

== Members ==
- Jose Luis Tapia Coronado – Founder – Rhythm Guitar (member from 1962–2019)
- Fernando Tapia Coronado – Bass Guitar (member from 1962–current)
- Artemio Chavez – Vocals & Lead Guitar (member from 1962–1978)
- Valentin Terrones – Drums (member from 1962–1972)
- Arturo Cisneros – Lead Singer (member from 1963–1994)
- Javier Virgen – Vocals & Bass (member from 1963–1980)
- Miguel Salazar Jasso (member from 1963–1968) uncredited background vocals & chorus. Lives in San Diego, CA.
- Esteban "Chester" Rodriguez – Organ (member from 1968–1974)
- Arturo "Chicho" Linares – Keyboards (member from 1978-2022)
- Raziel De Lugo – Lead Guitar (member from 1978–1995)
- Ivan Villarreal (Lead guitar) 1995–2003
- Pedro Iniguez – Keyboards (member from 1991–1992)
- Carlos "Charlie" DeLeon – Percussion (member from 1986–2011)
- Jorge Antonio B – Lead Guitar (member from 1981–1986)
- Roberto Puentes – Drums (member from 1975–1989)
- Ricardo Rodriguez – Lead Singer (member from 1994–2003)

== Beginnings ==
In 1962, five high-school friends from a small town of San Andres, a suburb of Guadalajara, State of Jalisco, Mexico, united their incipient musical skills to form a group called The Freddy Boys that would eventually become one of Mexico's most popular bands and influential in the development of Spanish music across Latin America for the next 30 years. The Freddy Boys began with José Luis Tapia Coronado (guitar), his brother Fernando Tapia Coronado (bass guitar), Ricardo (vocals), Artemio Chávez (requinto – high pitched version guitar) y Valentín Terrones (drums).

In 1963, the band relocated to Tijuana, Baja California, Mexico. They played in bars (La Jacaranda), dance halls (Esmirna, Atenas Versailles, Flamingo). They recorded "Diciendote Te Quiero" on a 45 record with "Sueno Feliz" on the B-Side. "Diciendote Te Quiero" was the group's first hit. Followed by "Ven Dame Tu Fe" and "Mato Mi Corozon."

The band then began touring throughout Mexico (Mexicali, Ensenada, Agua Prieta, Culiacan, Nogales, among many others).

The group recorded various albums in 45's, extended play and long play versions.

== Turmoil in the End ==
In an interview with morning radio host Pepe Reyes (La Preciosa Network, Clear Channel Radio), lead singer Arturo Cisneros announced he officially left the band on August 29, 1994. Cisneros stated that he began recording for an undisclosed record label as a solo artist in the following months and by January 1995 had completed 5 solo albums. In 1997, Cisneros formed his own version of los Freddy's (Arturo Cisneros Y sus Freddy's) with three former members of the original Freddy's: Octavio Aguilar, Raziel de Lugo & Ruperto Lopez.

== Discography ==
All albums released on Peerless Records are marked with an identification number beginning with "LPPU_...".
Record pressings released in the U.S.A. are marked with an identification numbers beginning with "ECO-...".

=== Albums ===
- 1964: Los Freddy's (Wooly Bully) (ECO-386)
- 1965: Buscando Un Amor (ECO-471)
- 1966: Sufriras Sin Mi (ECO-522)
- 1967: La Flaca (ECO-589)
- 1968: Mató Mi Corazón (ECO-748)
- 1969: Obsesión (ECO-762)
- 1970: Sin Tu Amor (ECO-895)
- 1971: Lágrimas Son (ECO-969)
- 1972: Cón Tu Adios (ECO-25073)
- 1973: Quiero Ser Feliz (ECO-25109)
- 1974: Llegará Tu Final (ECO-25242)
- 1975: Aquel Amor (LPPU-10021)
- 1975: Fuiste Mala (LPPU-10027)(ECO-25442)
- 1976: Un Sentimiento (LPPU-10035)
- 1977: Cariñito Malo (LPPU-10040)(ECO-25602)
- 1978: Porque No Perdonar (ECO-25747)
- 1979: Celoso (LPPU-10051)(ECO-25863)
- 1980: El Tren (ECO-25941-2)
- 1981: El Primer Tonto
- 1984: Y Me Enamoré
- 1985: No Quiero Que Me Engañes (Profono) U.S. Billboard Regional Mexican peak #20
- 1986: Por Segunda Vez
- 1987: Sentimiento y Sabor (ECO-?)
- 1988: Vida Nueva
- 1991: Los Freddy's '91 (Fonovisa) U.S. Regional Mexican #7
- 1992: 30 Años Despues
- 1994: Gracias Pueblo Mio
- 1995: Sin Límite de Tiempo
- 1996: La Leyenda Continúa
- 1998: Locuras de Amor
- 2000: 1500 Amores
- 2000: Con Banda
- 2000: El Sentimiento Del Rey Jose Alfredo

=== Compilations ===
- 1975: Epoca de Oro, Vol. 1 (LPPU-10014)
- 1978: 10 Exitos (1968-1971)
- 1983?: 10 Exitos Con Banda
- 1987: 15 de Ellos
- 1988: 15 Exitos
- 1993?: Pero Como Duele
- 1995: 15 Grandes Favoritas
- 1996?: Por Siempre
- 2003: 30 Inolvidables U.S. Regional Mexican #14, U.S. Latin #21

== Singles ==
- Wooly Bully (1965)
- Muchachos (1965)
- Diciendote Te Quiero (1965)
- Sufrirás Sin Mí (1966)
- La Flaca (1967)
- Penny Lane (1967)
- Máto Mi Corazon (1968)
- Vuelvé Mi Amor (1968)
- Toda Una Vida (1969)
- Mis Noches Sin Ti (1969)
- Aunque Me Hagas Llorar (1970)
- Sin Tu Amor (1970) (cover of 'The Way It Used To Be' by Engelbert Humperdinck)
- Asi es La Vida (1970)
- No Te Olvidare (1970)
- Lágrimas Son (1971)
- Vén (1971)
- Cón Tu Adios (1972)
- Tus Manos (1972)
- Déjenme Llorar (1973) - Number-one hit in Mexico for two weeks.
- Es Mejor Decir Adiós (1973)
- El Cariño Que Perdí (1974)
- El Primer Tonto (1980)
- El Tren (1981)
- Y Me Enamore (1982)
- La Numero Cien (1982)
- Ven a Bailar (1984)
- Embrujado (1984)
- No Quiero Que Me Engañes (1986)
- No Me Da Pena Llorar (1988)
- Me Dieron Ganas de Llorar (1989)
- Pero Acuerdate de Mi (1991)
- Tu Condena (1991)
- Esa Muchacha (1992)
- Me Esta Doliendo(1992)
- Gracias Pueblo Mio (1994)
- Porque Me Engañaste (1994)
