= Gracias por Esperar =

Studio album by Juan Gabriel
- Released: June 28, 1994
- Recorded: 1993–1994
- Genre: Latin pop
- Label: Sony BMG

Juan Gabriel chronology
Pensamientos (1986)	Gracias por Esperar (1994)	El México Que Se Nos Fue (1995)

Gracias por Esperar (Thanks For Waiting) is the twenty-first studio album by Mexican recording artist Juan Gabriel, released on June 28, 1994, eight years after his previous studio album in 1986. This extraordinarily long period of time between Juan Gabriel's prolific releases was due to a copyright dispute with his publisher BMG Music Publishing. The album was nominated for a Lo Nuestro Award for Pop Album of the Year and a Grammy Award for Best Latin Pop Album. losing both to Luis Miguel's Segundo Romance. Gabriel released four singles from the album, "Pero Que Necesidad", "Lentamente", "Vienes o Voy", and "Muriendo de Amor", with the first peaking at number-one at the Billboard Latin Songs chart.

== Track listing ==
No.	Title	Length
1.	"Vienes o Voy"	5:07
2.	"Pero Qué Necesidad"	5:54
3.	"Lentamente"	8:49
4.	"Cariño Mío"	5:23
5.	"Más Que Amor"	4:28
6.	"Di, Ámame Más"	3:57
7.	"Como la Luna"	4:56
8.	"Luna Tras Luna"	5:36
9.	"Que Bello Es Vivir"	4:50
10.	"Muriendo de Amor"	5:31
11.	"El Amor"	5:22

== Charts ==
Chart (1994)	Peak position
US Top Latin Albums (Billboard)	4
US Latin Pop Albums (Billboard)	2

== Album certification ==
Region	Certification	Certified units/sales
Mexico	—	600,000
United States (RIAA)	2× Platinum (Latin)	200,000^{^}
^{^} Shipments figures based on certification alone.
