= Dave Maclean =

- Born: José Carlos González; 29 September 1944; São Paulo, Brazil
- Origin: Brazil
- Died: 17 June 2023 (aged 78) São Paulo, Brazil
- Genres: Pop rock, Sertanejo
- Occupations: Singer, songwriter, musician
- Instrument: Vocals
- Years active: 1969–2001
- Label: Som Livre
- Website: davemaclean.com.br

Dave Maclean (born José Carlos González, 29 September 1944 – 17 June 2023) was a Brazilian singer-songwriter, whose repertoire sung in English was very successful in the 1970s.

== Biography ==
Born in Brazil to a Spanish father, Maclean became interested in singing and playing at the age of five. In 1969, he started a band named "Os Botões" in the ABC Region, in the Greater São Paulo. The band had its name anglicized later, becoming "The Buttons". In 1973, Som Livre, a subsidiary of Rede Globo, made a proposal for Maclean to record songs in English, so they could become part of soap opera soundtracks. At that time, being featured in the television shows with the highest audience across all TV channels in the country, would push sales of any records related to those programs. Because of that, Maclean became a very popular artist in Brazil.

=== 1970s ===
Maclean scored several hits, such as "Me and You," (the theme song for the soap opera "Os Ossos do "Barão"), "We Said Goodbye", "Tears" (also recorded by Chrystian, a Brazilian singer), and "Feelings" (an international hit by Morris Albert). "We said Goodbye" was a resounding success, and received Gold Records both in Brazil and Mexico. In Mexico, Maclean did a remarkable job of putting four hits within the top ten. The singer also had recognition in countries like Philippines, Ecuador, Panama, Portugal, United States, Spain, France and England.

=== 1980s and 1990s ===
In 1980, the rush of Brazilian singers recording in English had slowed down. Maclean invited the Munhoz brothers to form the trio "Dollar Company", which remained for more than 15 years. In 1996, Maclean took a new direction to his music career, and set up a new band: "Montana Country", taking advantage of a new wave to modernize American country music.

=== Composer ===
As a composer of sertanejo music, his works in Portuguese became known through artists like Gian and Giovani (Mil Corações), Sérgio Reis (Palavras de Amor e Na Outra Mão), Sula Miranda (Fogo e Palha), Sandy & Junior (Pra Dançar com Você e Ser Criança), Nalva Aguiar (Cowboy de Rodeio), among others. Maclean also participated in the recordings of other artists, exponents of national music, such as: Zezé Di Camargo & Luciano, Leandro e Leonardo, Edson and Hudson, Amado Batista, Joanna, Sérgio Reis, Sula Miranda, Willie Nelson, Duduca e Dalvan, Marlon e Maycon, among others.

=== 2010s ===
Maclean was performing with "The 70's International Sound," singing songs of Bee Gees, Elton John, Johnny Rivers and The Beatles. He also performed in the "Hits Again" show, playing his old hits and his 1970s best contemporaries such as Paul Denver, Steve Maclean, Pholhas, and others.

== Death ==
Maclean died in São Paulo on 17 June 2023, at the age of 78.

== Discography ==
=== Os Botões ===
- 1969 – Os Botões
- 1969 – Os Botões

=== Albums ===
- 1973 – Me And You
- 1974 – Dave Maclean
- 1975 – Dave Maclean
- 1976 – For All The Children
- 1976 – Y Así Quedé en Soledad
- 2001 – Dave Maclean Hearts In Love
- 2001 – Dave Maclean Ao Vivo

=== Singles and EPs ===
- 1973 – Me And You/Like A Rainbow
- 1973 – To Be In Love With You/Changin' My Life
- 1974 – We Said Goodbye/Now I Know
- 1974 – We Said Goodbye
- 1974 – We Said Goodbye/Rain And Memories
- 1975 – We Said Goodbye/Feelings
- 1975 – I'm Going Away/You
- 1975 – We Said Goodbye/Do You Wanna Dance
- 1976 – Nos Dijimos Adios/Lagrimas En Mi Rostro
- 1975 – Solitaire / Chance Of Love
- 1975 – Solitaire
- 1976 – Nos Dijimos Adios/Tan Solo Por Amor
- 1976 – I Don't Care/I'll Come Back
- 1976 – I Don't Care/Rhythm Of The Rain
- Unknown - Sentimientos/Change Of Love

=== Dollar Company ===
- 1981 – Dollar Co
- 1981 – Dollar Co 2

=== Montana Country ===
- 1996 – Montana Country
- 1997 – Montana Country 2
- 1999 – Montana Country Country Beatles
- 2000 – Montana Country
