= Pensamientos =

Studio album by Juan Gabriel
- Released: November 25, 1986
- Recorded: 1986
- Studio: RCA Studio B (Nashville, Tennessee)
- Genre: Latin pop, mariachi
- Length: 42:58
- Label: RCA Ariola
- Producer: Juan Gabriel

Juan Gabriel chronology
Recuerdos, Vol. II (1984)	Pensamientos (1986)	Gracias por Esperar (1994)

Professional ratings
Review scores
Source	Rating
Allmusic	4/5 stars

Pensamientos (English: Thoughts) is the twentieth studio album written, produced and performed by Mexican singer-songwriter Juan Gabriel. It was released on November 25, 1986. It was his last studio album until 1994, when his legal battle against his label ended.

== Track listing ==
All tracks are written by Juan Gabriel.

No.	Title	Length
1.	"Doquiera Estás Tú"	3:12
2.	"Ha Llegado un Angel"	5:30
3.	"Amor es Amor"	3:24
4.	"Te lo Pido por Favor"	3:38
5.	"Yo No Sé Qué Me Pasó"	5:12
6.	"Que Lástima"	3:59
7.	"Sólo Sé Que Fue en Marzo"	4:03
8.	"El Día Que Me Acaricies Lloraré"	3:33
9.	"Así Se Quiere"	3:09
10.	"Hasta Que Te Conocí"	7:14

== Personnel ==
- Juan Gabriel – Producer
- Chuck Anderson – Arranger, director
- David Esquivel — Musical engineer
- Carlos Ceballos — Musical engineer
- Stan Ross — Musical engineer
- Ryan Uliate — Musical engineer
- Arriba Juárez No. 1 — Mariachi
- Alberto Reyna — Graphic design
- Joel García — Carátula

== Chart performance ==
Chart (1986–1987)	Peak position
US Billboard Latin Pop Albums	2
