= Maná =

Mexican rock band

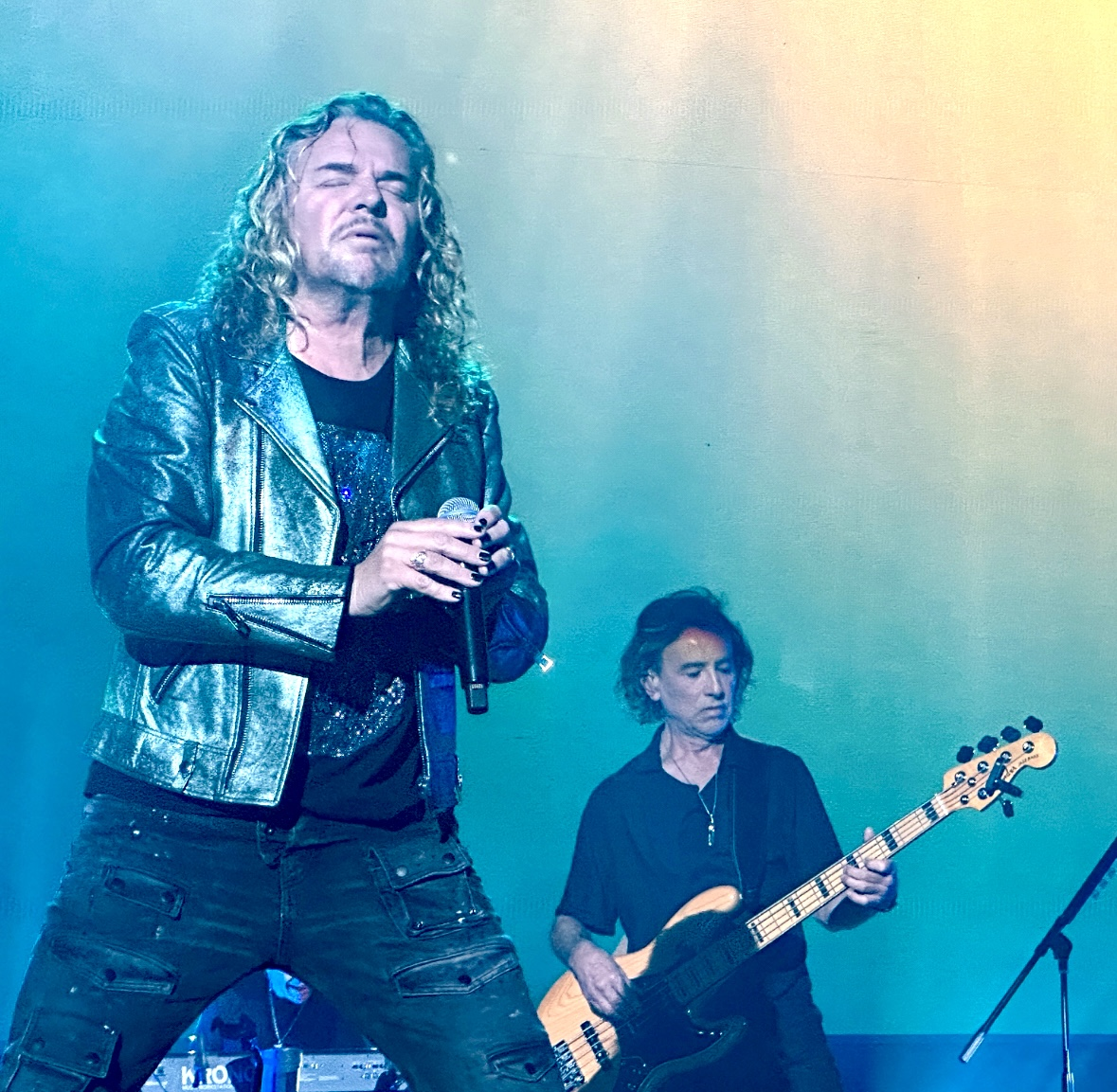
- Maná in Denver, Colorado, in 2023

Background information
- Also known as: Sombrero Verde (1981–1987)
- Origin: Guadalajara, Jalisco, Mexico
- Genres: Latin pop; Latin rock; pop-rock; rock en español
- Years active: 1986–present
- Label: WEA International
- Members: Fher Olvera; Alex González; Sergio Vallín; Juan Calleros
- Past members: Ulises Calleros; Iván González; Abraham Calleros; César "Vampiro" López; Gustavo Orozco; Sheila Ríos
- Website: mana.com.mx

Maná (Spanish: [maˈna]) is a Mexican pop rock band formed in 1981. Originally called Sombrero Verde, the current lineup of members is vocalist-guitarist Fher Olvera, drummer Alex González, guitarist Sergio Vallín and bassist Juan Calleros. The band is one of the best-selling Latin Mexican music artists and the most successful Latin American band of all time with over 45 million records sold worldwide. Maná has earned four Grammy Awards, eight Latin Grammy Awards, five MTV Video Music Awards Latin America, six Premios Juventud awards, 19 Billboard Latin Music Awards and 15 Premios Lo Nuestro awards.

After performing under the name Sombrero Verde for six years, they renamed to Maná in 1986 and released their debut studio album, Maná, in 1987. In 1992, the group released ¿Dónde Jugarán Los Niños?, which sold more than 10 million copies worldwide (over 700,000 copies in the US), becoming the best-selling Spanish-language rock album of all time. After several membership changes, the group released Cuando los Ángeles Lloran (1995), which is noted for its stylistic departure from the band's previous work. Maná followed with Sueños Líquidos (1997), Revolución de Amor (2002) and Amar es Combatir (2006), which continued their success. The band followed up with Drama y Luz in April 2011. Their most recent album is Cama Incendiada, which was released in early 2015.

The band draws from pop rock, progressive rock, Latin pop, calypso, reggae and ska music genres. They initially achieved success in Latin America and Spain and have since then achieved worldwide commercial success and popularity.

== History ==
=== 1986–89: formation and early releases ===
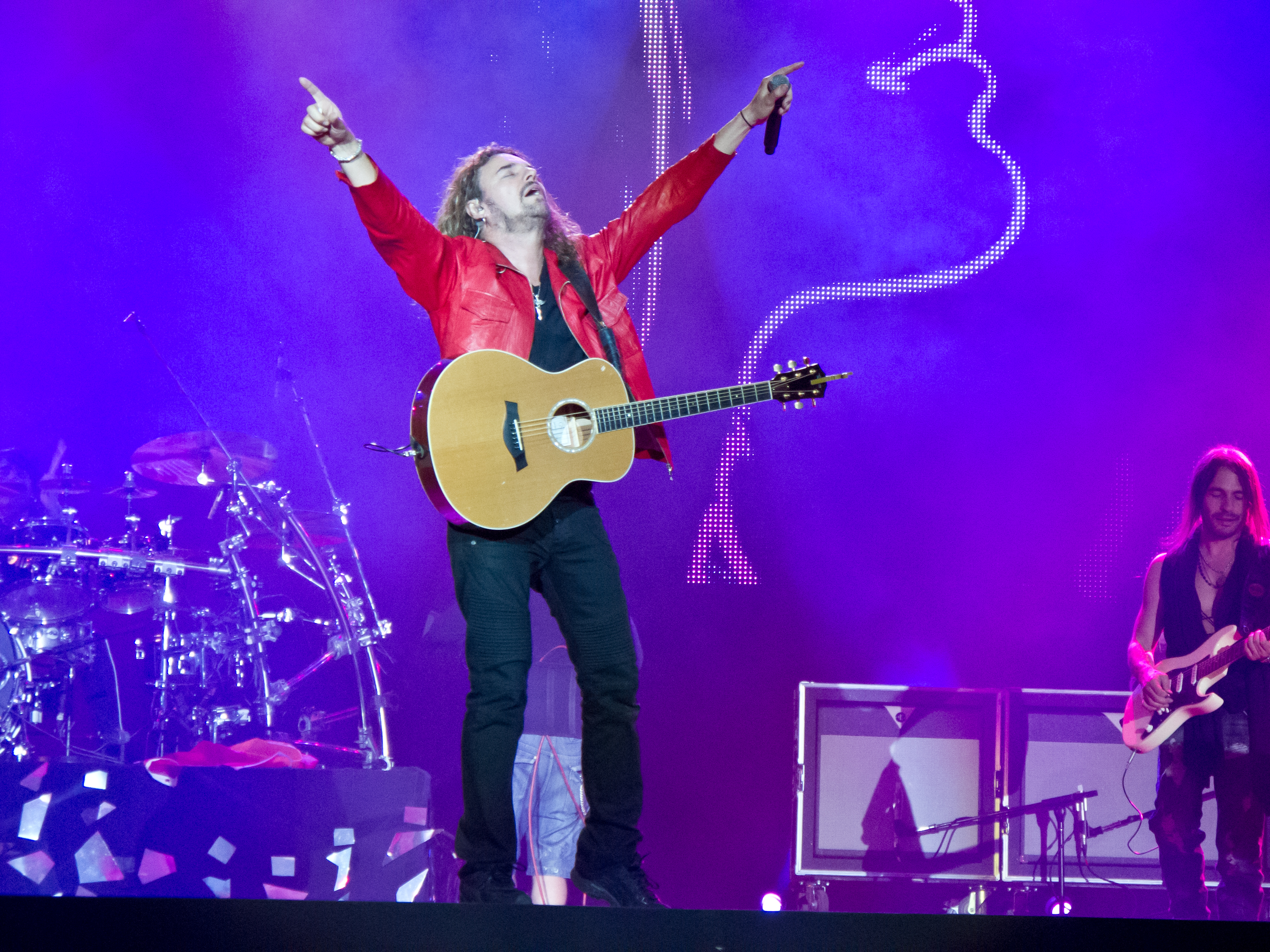
Fher, lead singer

Maná was formed in 1986 by José Fernando "Fher" Olvera (vocals), Ulises Calleros (guitar), and Juan Calleros (bass guitar), who had been performing together in a band called Sombrero Verde since the mid-1970s and disbanded in 1983. The three placed an advertisement in the local Guadalajara newspaper looking for a drummer to complete a new band, to which 15-year-old American Alex González applied and soon joined the group. Maná's first album was titled "Maná" and was released on 12 May 1987 on A&M Records. Maná signed to PolyGram but became unhappy with the direction the label was taking the band and switched to Warner Music shortly before the release of the group's second album, Falta Amor.

Two years passed before the album garnered its first hit single, "Rayando el Sol". The group toured heavily in support of the album, performing more than 250 times throughout Latin America, including shows in Mexico, Peru, Ecuador, and Colombia.

=== 1990–96: commercial success ===
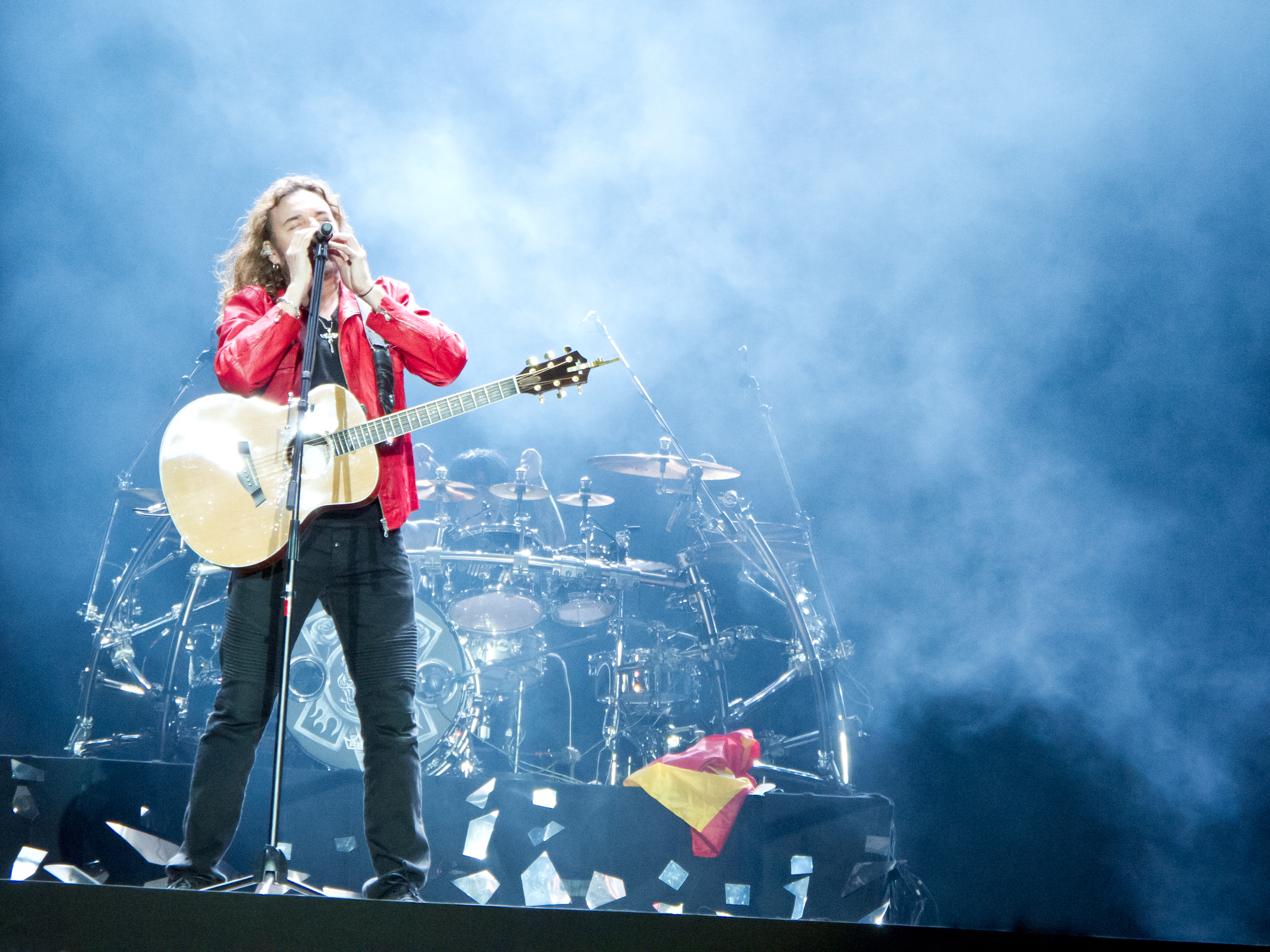
Rock in Rio Madrid 2012

In 1991, they added two new members to the group Iván González on keyboards and César "Vampiro" López on guitar. Ulises Calleros no longer performed with the group, but became one of their managers. On 27 October 1992, the band released ¿Dónde Jugarán Los Niños?, an album that spawned several hits (including "Oye Mi Amor", "De Pies A Cabeza", and "Vivir Sin Aire"). The record sold over three million copies worldwide and became the best-selling Spanish-language rock album of all time. The band undertook an international tour with 268 concerts in 17 countries.

In 1994, López and Iván González left the group due to musical and personal disputes. Fher Olvera and Alex González felt that their departure offered an opportunity to reinvent the group's sound, and searched throughout Mexico, Spain, and Argentina to find a new guitarist.

In the meantime, Maná released the live album Maná en Vivo before choosing Mexican guitarist Sergio Vallín to replace Calleros and López. In 1995, the band recorded a Spanish version of Led Zeppelin's "Fool in the Rain" (Tonto En La Lluvia) for the tribute album Encomium.

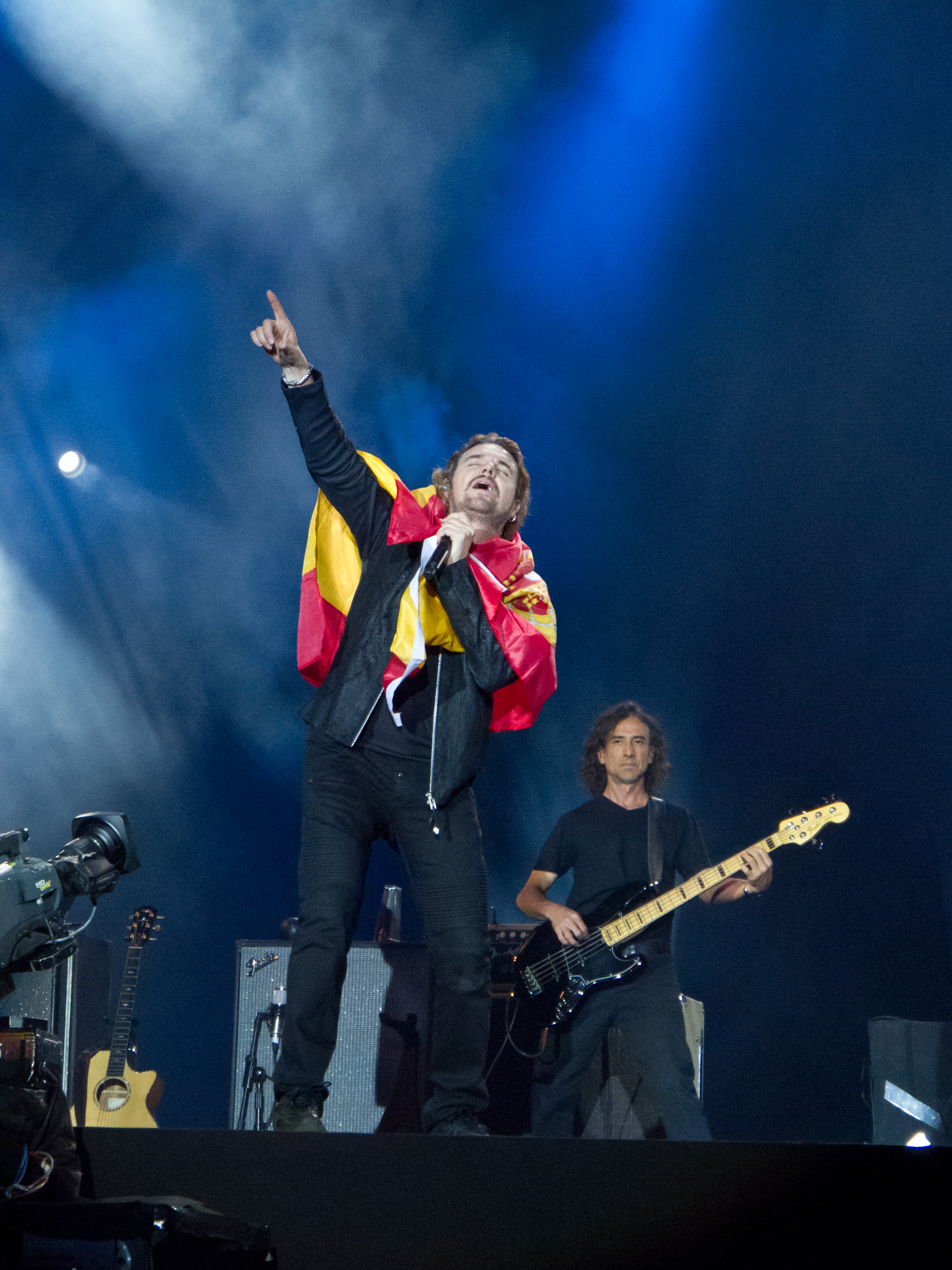
Lead singer Fher Olvera and Juan Calleros performing at Rock in Rio Madrid 2012

On 25 April 1995, the group released Cuando los Ángeles Lloran. The album was noted for its stylistic departure from the band's previous work, which saw the group experimenting with funk and soul music genres. Olvera explained shortly after the release of the album, "Basically, we're still the same Maná, but we're going through a funky, soulish stage. We want to have some fun and be a little louder." The initial reaction to Cuando los Ángeles Lloran was mixed and the first single, the funk-influenced "Déjame Entrar", failed to reach the top ten on the Mexican Singles Chart. However, the album later caught on and sold 500,000 copies in the United States alone within five months of release.

=== 1997–2007: Sueños Líquidos, Revolución de Amor, and Amar es Combatir ===
In 1997, the group released Sueños Líquidos, an album about the highs and lows of love, with songs like "Clavado en un bar" and "En el muelle de San Blas", recorded in Puerto Vallarta and released simultaneously in 36 countries. The recording received a Grammy Award for Best Latin Rock/Alternative Album. The group performed acoustically in Miami for Latin America's MTV Unplugged program. A final version of the performance was mixed at Conway Recording Studios in Hollywood, and the band released Maná MTV Unplugged on 14 May 1999.

In 2002, to blend their sound with that of rock and roll from the sixties and seventies, the band recorded Revolución de Amor. They won their fourth Grammy for the album. The band released a new version of "Eres mi Religión" for the Italian market in 2003, as a duet with Italian musician Zucchero, and also performed with Zucchero in a new recording of his "Baila Morena". This same year they participated in the annual Pavarotti & Friends concert, along with Queen, Deep Purple, Ricky Martin, Andrea Bocelli, Zucchero, and Bono.

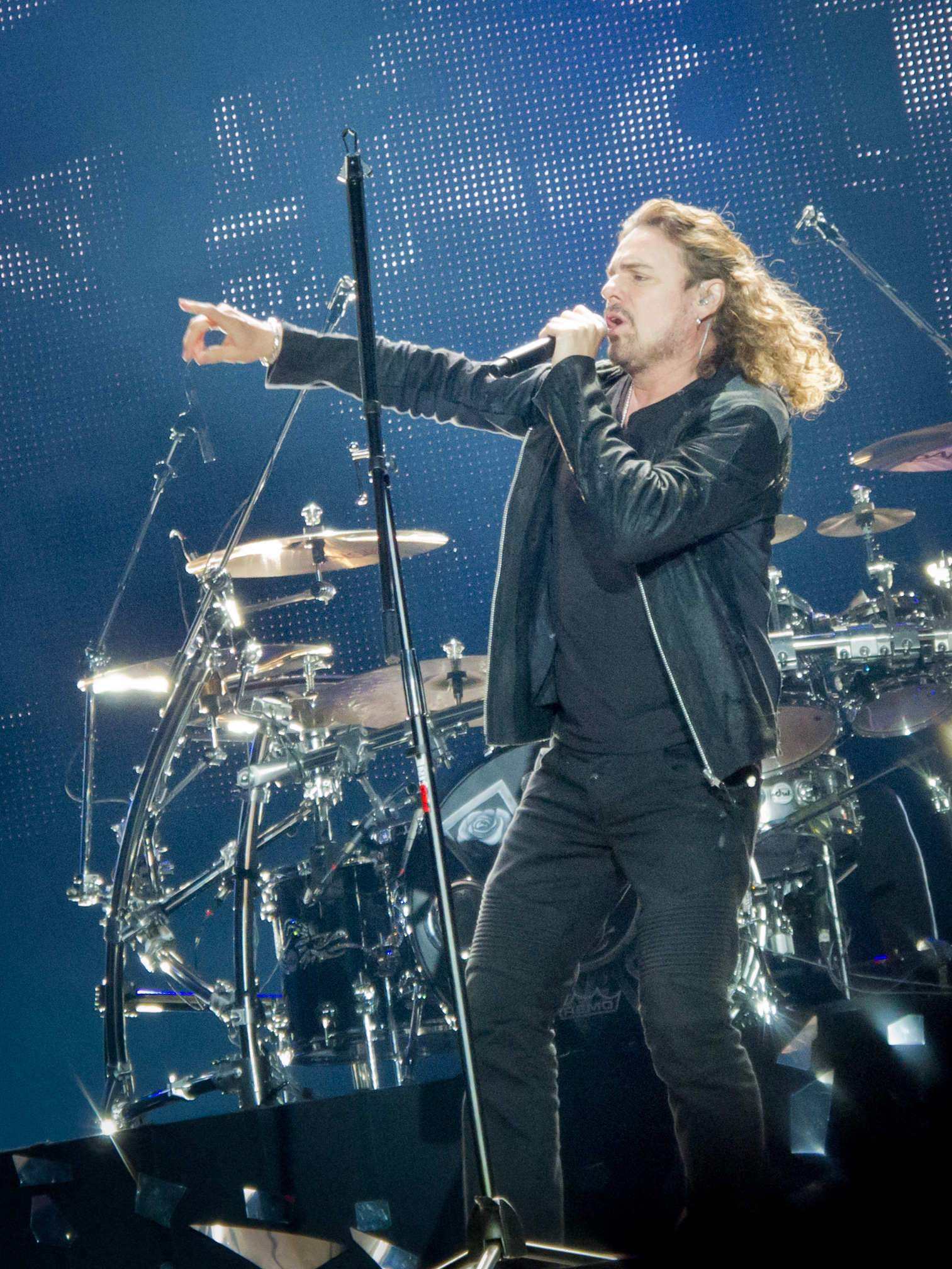
Fher Olvera performing at Rock in Rio Madrid 2012

In 2006, after a four-year hiatus, they released their seventh studio album, Amar es Combatir. It reached #4 on the Billboard Top 200 in its first week, selling over 60,000 copies in the first week. Their first single off the album, "Labios Compartidos", rose to the top of the music charts upon its debut in July, when the group played the song live at the Premios Juventud. Amar es Combatir has sold over 644,000 copies, and the Amar es Combatir Tour in promotion of the album grossed more than $35 million.

In 2008, Maná released a live album entitled Arde El Cielo, in both a CD and CD/DVD package. This release shows the band performing during the Amar es Combatir Tour in support of Amar es Combatir.

=== 2008–2012: Drama y Luz ===
On 12 April 2011, the band released its eighth studio album, Drama y Luz. The record's release was delayed several times, initially scheduled for a fall 2010 release, which was later changed to December 2010, and finally changed to April 2011. The band explained that Drama y Luz was not ready for fans and spent time during the delays putting the finishing touches on the record. Themes addressed on the album include love, hope, addiction, and racism. The first single from the album, "Lluvia al Corazón", became the band's sixth song to reach number one on the Billboard Latin Songs chart, as well as its eighth song to top the magazine's Latin Pop Songs chart.

=== 2013–present: Cama Incendiada / Rayando el sol Tour ===
In 2015 the most recent studio album Cama incendiada was released.

In 2016, Maná was inducted into the Hollywood Walk of Fame.

In 2018, Mana received the Billboard Latin Music Lifetime Achievement Award and performed live on Telemundo from the Mandalay Bay Events Center in Las Vegas. Mana was honored as the Latin Recording Academy Person of the Year on 14 November 2018.

In 2019, Mana announced in February 2019 their new tour "Rayando el sol tour" that will start in the USA in September 2019. On 12 April Maná released a new version of their classic hit Rayando el sol featuring Spanish singer Pablo Alborán as the first song from their upcoming project.

In August 2021, Billboard and Telemundo announced that Maná would be honored with the icon award at the 2021 Billboard Latin Music Awards on 23 September 2021. The announcement included that the band would also perform a remake of the classic "El Reloj Cucú" ft. 12-year-old singer Mabel at the awards show.

In 2025, Maná were nominated for induction into the Rock and Roll Hall of Fame for the first time. Maná are the first Spanish-language rock group to be nominated for Rock Hall induction.

On June 11, 2026, Maná performed "Oye Mi Amor" at the opening ceremony of the 2026 FIFA World Cup.

== Selva Negra Foundation ==
Selva Negra Foundation ("Black Jungle Foundation") is a foundation formed by Maná in 1995. Under the direction of Mari González and Augusto Benavides, they finance and support important projects aimed at protecting the environment. With the support of Mexico's government, they also have efforts to save the sea turtle by raising 140,000 turtle eggs for release on the country's Pacific coast.

On 7 April 2008, Maná and the Selva Negra Foundation were named "Champions of Health" by the Pan American Health Organization during an observance of World Health Day 2008 at PAHO headquarters in Washington, D.C.

== Politics ==
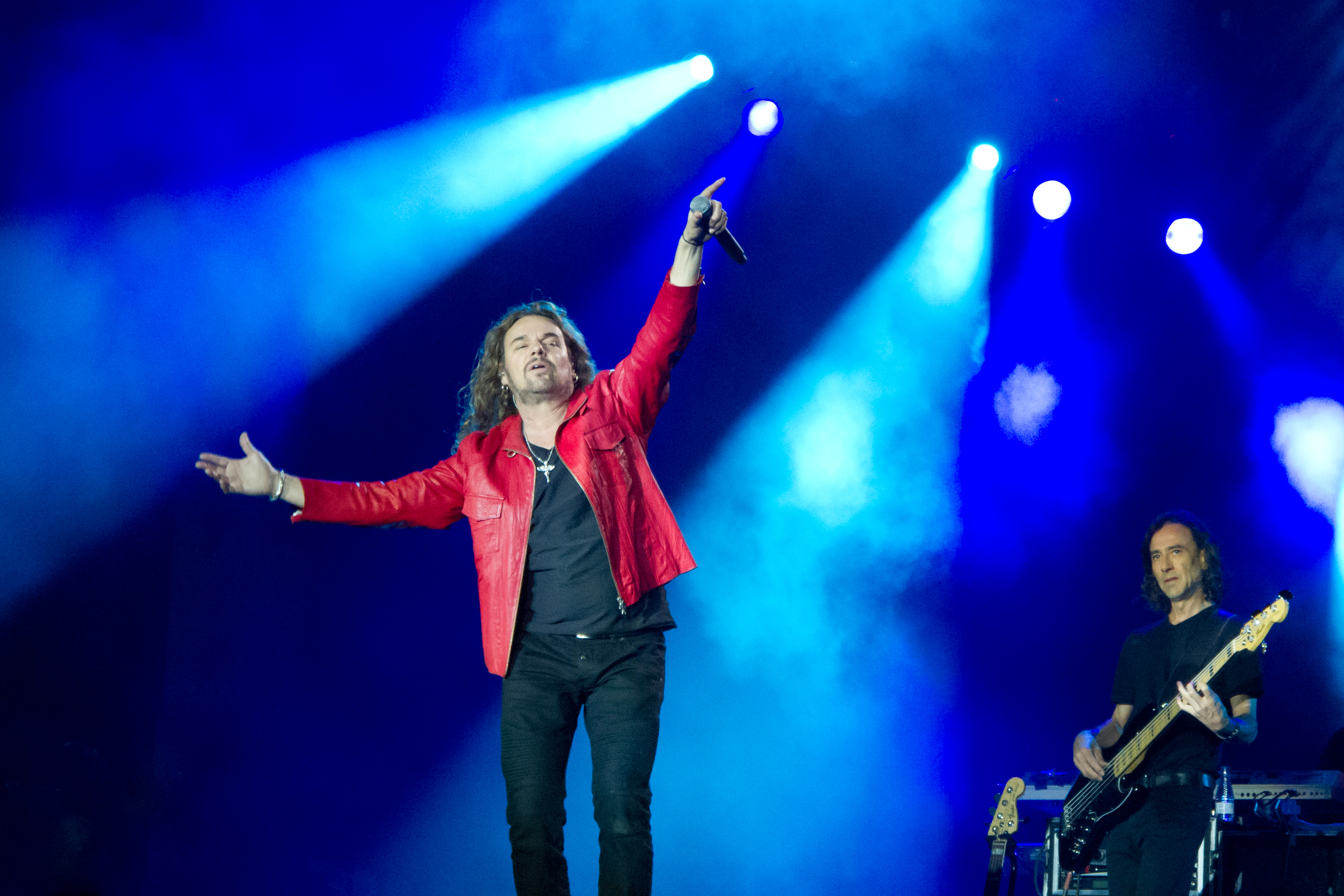
Maná in concert in Rock in Rio in Madrid in 2012

Mana is known for its involvement in social and political issues. The band has been active in supporting environmental causes, human rights, and other charitable efforts. Their song "Eres mi religión" is often cited for its spiritual and humanitarian message.

Several of their songs have political inspirations; the liner notes for "Me Voy a Convertir en Un Ave", on the album Sueños Líquidos, notes that the song is "inspired by the book Pedro y el capitán by Mario Benedetti and dedicated to all those who, for defending an ideal of justice, are persecuted or find themselves imprisoned. To the Zapatista Army of National Liberation communities for peace and dignity."

On 29 March 2007, Puerto Rico's Channel 4, WAPA's News program, reported that Maná publicly supported Puerto Rico's prospective independence from the United States. In an interview that followed the aforementioned news announcement, the members of Maná were interviewed by Channel 4 (WAPA) journalist, Rafael Lenín López, who asked them what they thought about Puerto Rico. Maná members confirmed that they support the Puerto Rican independence movement and favor greater sovereignty for the Latin American and Caribbean island-nation.

Maná supported U.S. President Barack Obama's 2012 reelection bid.

In September 2024, in response to Nicky Jam endorsing Donald Trump for president, Maná removed the song "De Pies a Cabeza," which they had recorded with Nicky Jam in 2016, from all digital platforms, stating that "Maná doesn't work with racists."

=== FAO Ambassador ===
The Food and Agriculture Organization of the United Nations (FAO) is a specialized agency of the United Nations that leads international efforts to defeat hunger. FAO was founded on 16 October 1945 in Quebec City, Quebec, Canada. The FAO Goodwill Ambassadors Programme was initiated in 1999. Maná was nominated and appointed FAO Ambassadors on 16 October 2003. Maná emphasized that their song "Justicia, Tierra y Libertad" (in English: Justice, Land, and Liberty [Freedom]) from the Revolución de Amor album, is a message of hope and inspiration in the search of a world without hunger.

== Band members ==
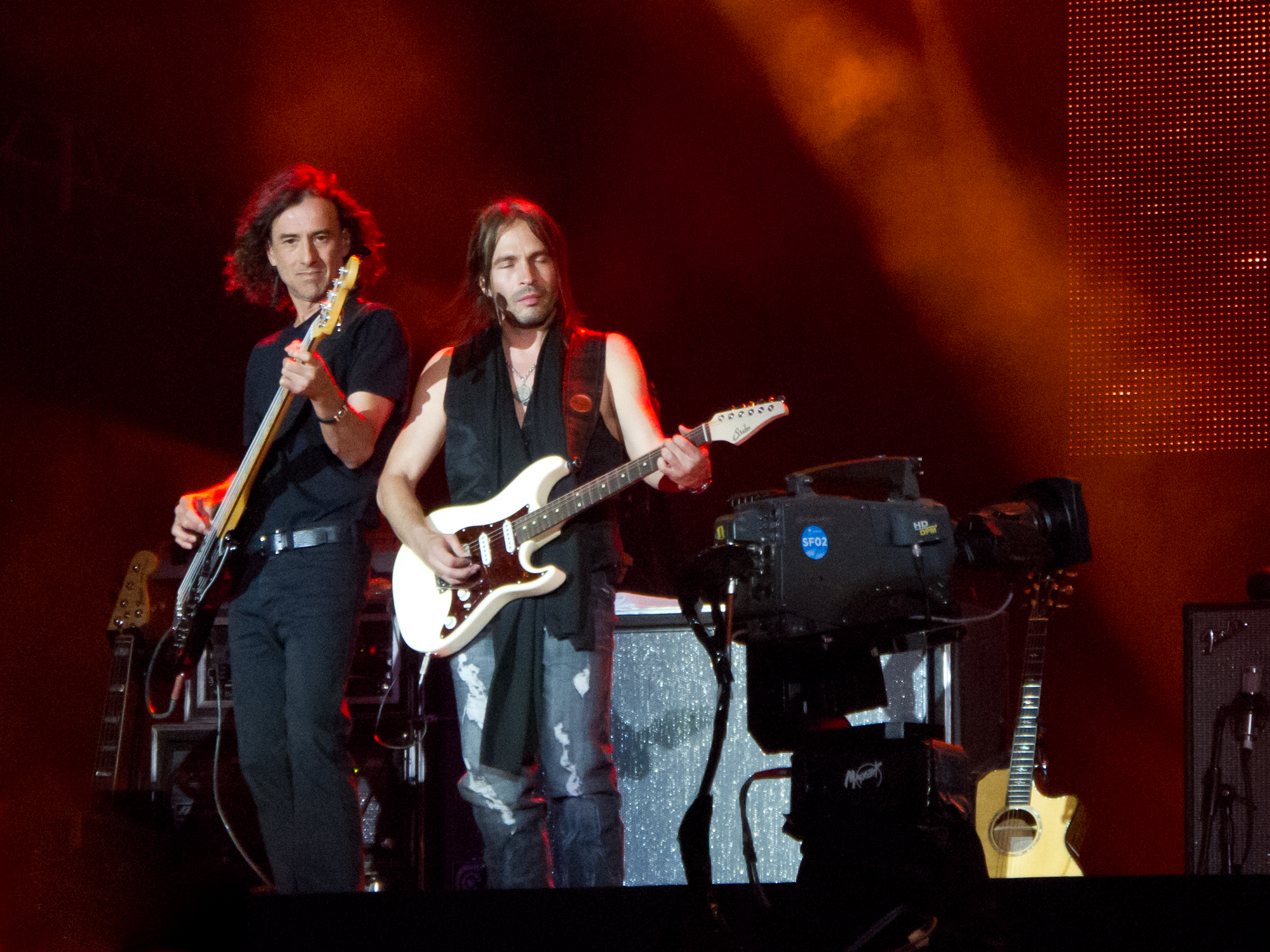
Bassist Juan Calleros and guitarist Sergio Vallín

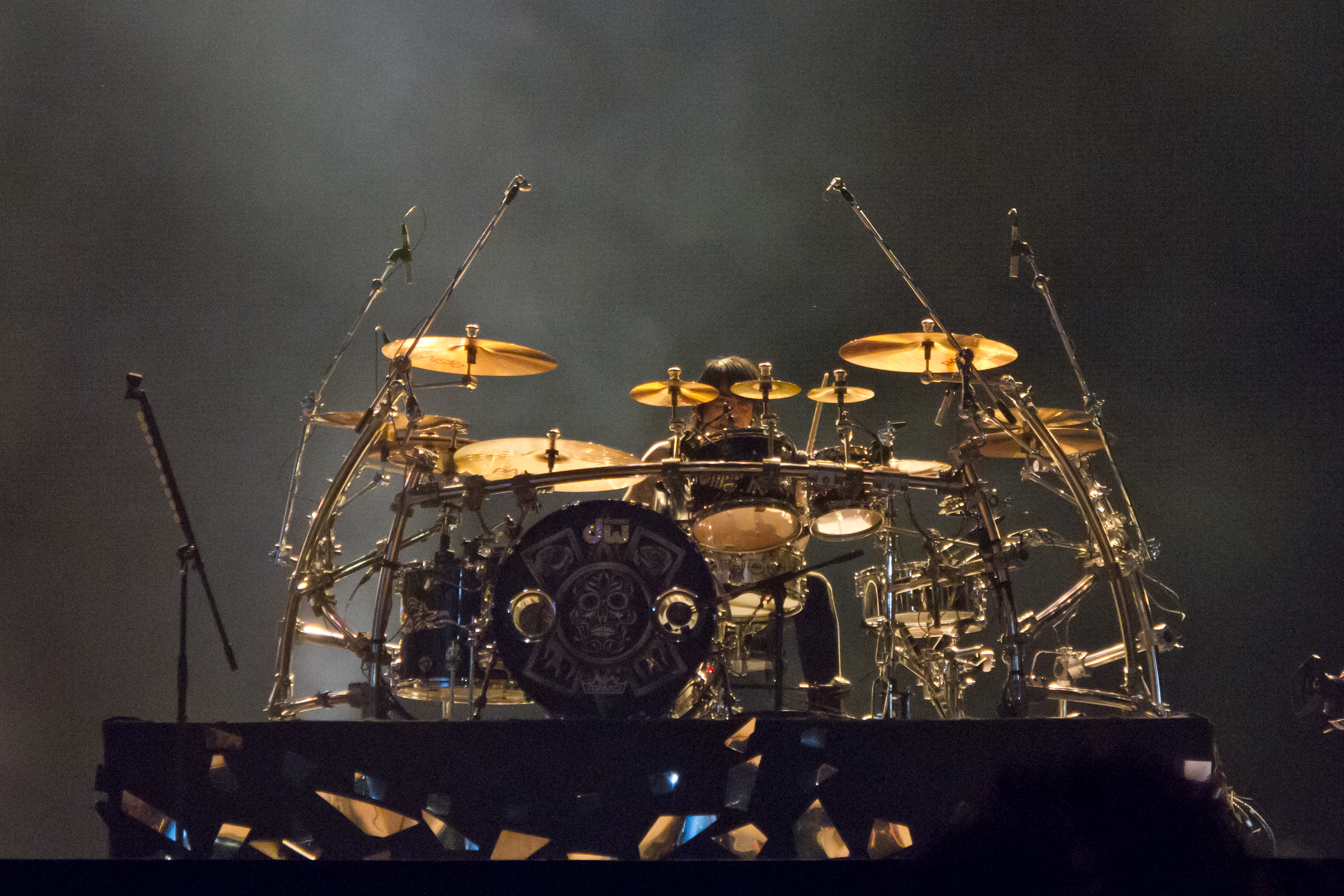
Alex González, drummer

=== Current members ===
- Fher Olvera — lead vocals, guitars, harmonica (1981–present)
- Juan Calleros — bass guitar (1981–present)
- Alex González — drums, percussion, backing vocals (1984–present)
- Sergio Vallín — guitars (1994–present)
- Juan Carlos Toribio — keyboards, synthesizers, organ (1994-present)

=== Former members ===
- Abraham Calleros — drums, percussion (1981–1984)
- Gustavo Orozco — guitars (1981–1985)
- Ulises Calleros — guitars (1981–1991)
- César "Vampiro" López — guitars (1991–1994)
- Ivan Gonzalez — keyboards, synthesizers, organ (1991–1994)
- Sheila Rios — backing vocals (1992–2003)

=== Touring musicians ===
- Juan Carlos Toribio — keyboards, piano, flute (1994–present)
- Fernando "Psycho" Vallin — guitars, bass, backing vocals (1997–present)
- Luis Conte — percussion (1999)
- Hector Quintana — percussion, backing vocals (2006–present)

== Discography ==
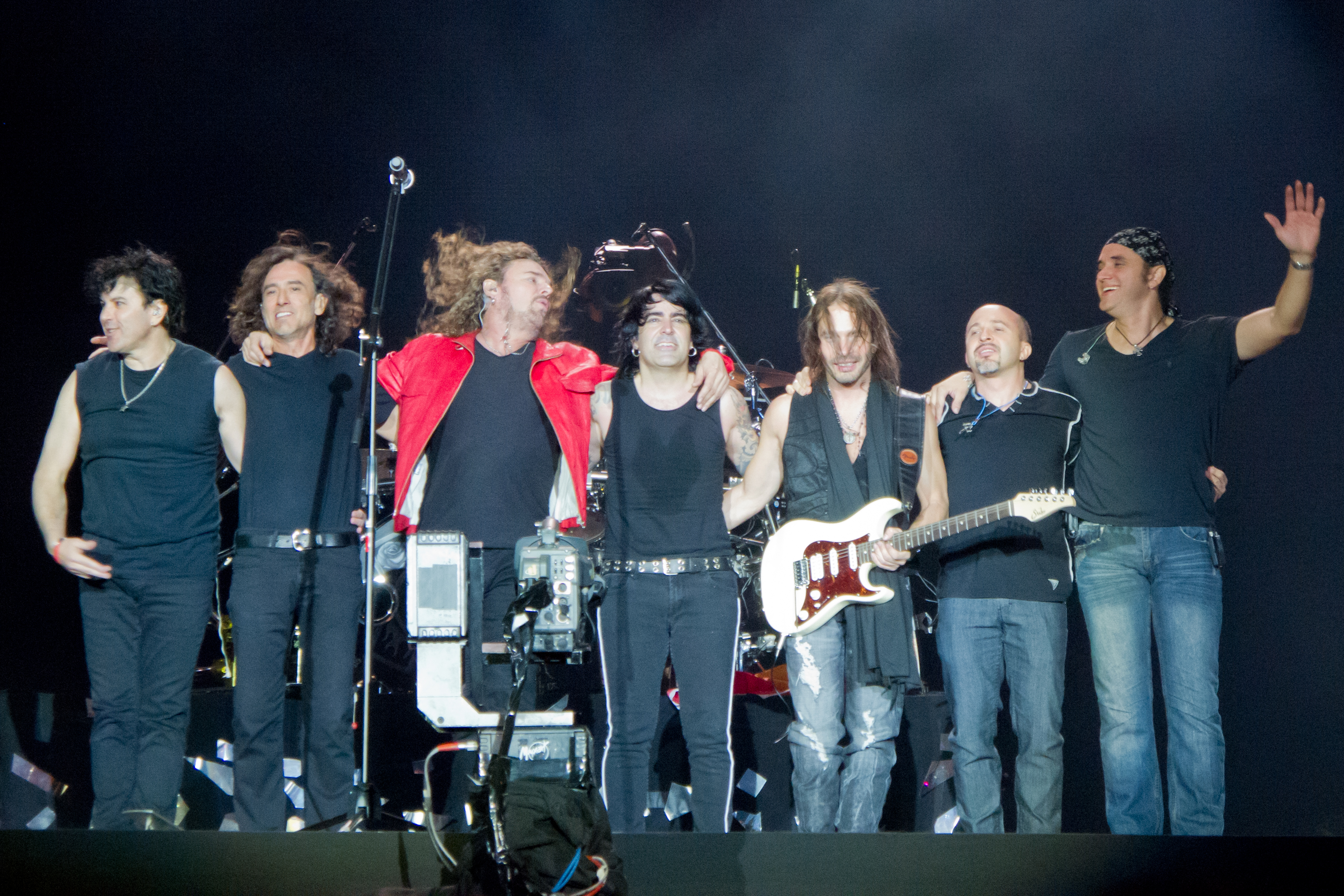
Members and additional band in 2012

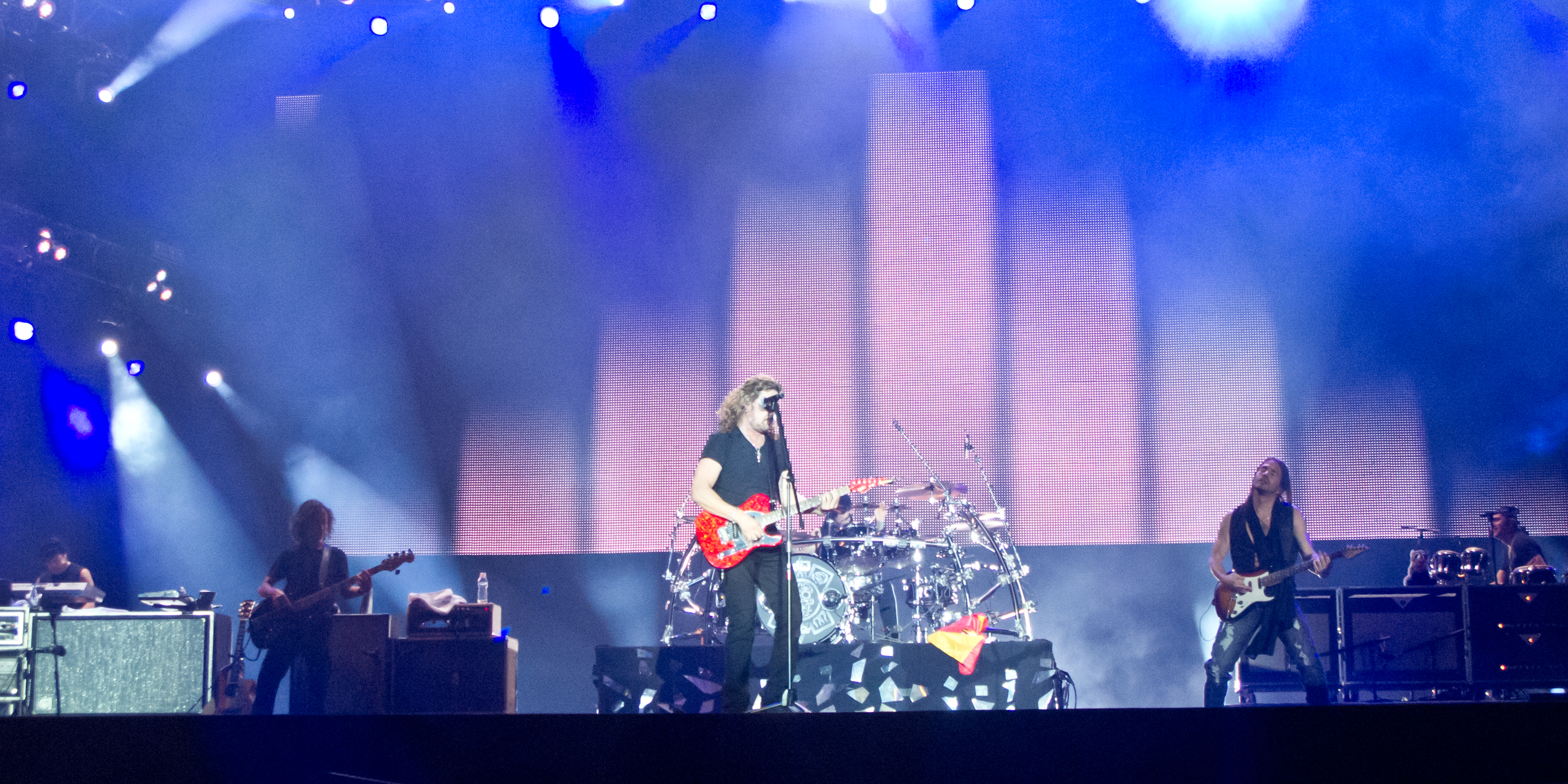
Rock in Rio Madrid 2012

=== As Sombrero Verde ===
(pre–Maná)

- 1981: Sombrero Verde
- 1983: A Tiempo de Rock

=== As Maná ===
- 1987: Maná
- 1990: Falta Amor
- 1992: ¿Dónde Jugarán los Niños?
- 1995: Cuando los Ángeles Lloran
- 1997: Sueños Líquidos
- 2002: Revolución de Amor
- 2006: Amar es Combatir
- 2011: Drama y Luz
- 2015: Cama Incendiada

== Tours ==
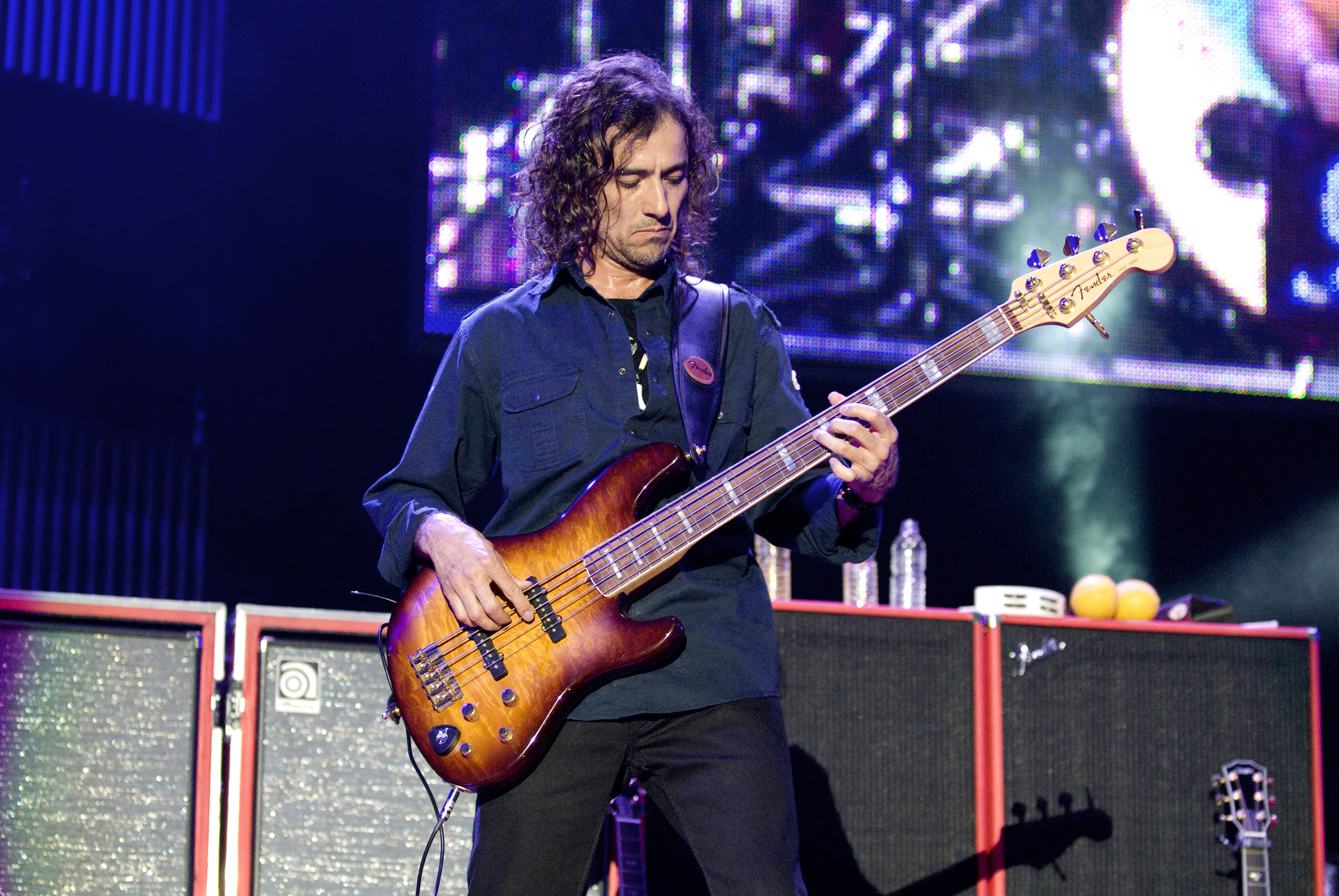
Juan, bassist of the group

- 1993–1995: ¿Dónde Jugarán Los Niños? Tour
- 1998: Liquido Tour
- 1999: Unplugged U.S. Tour
- 2002–2003: Revolución de Amor Tour
- 2007–2008: Amar es Combatir Tour
- 2011–2014: Drama y Luz World Tour
- 2015: Cama Incendiada Tour
- 2016: Latino Power Tour
- 2019: Rayando el Sol Tour
- 2023: Mexico Lindo y Querido Tour
- 2025: Vivir Sin Aire North América Tour

== See also ==
- Chico Mendes
- List of best-selling Latin music artists
- Yo amo a Juan Querendón (Mexican telenovela)
