= Mis Número 1...40 Aniversario =

Compilation album by Juan Gabriel
- Released: August 5, 2014
- Genre: Latin
- Language: Spanish
- Label: Sony Music Latin
- Producer: Juan Gabriel

Juan Gabriel chronology
Mis 40 en Bellas Artes (2014)	Mis Número 1...40 Aniversario (2014)	Juan Gabriel Dúos & Interpretaciones

Mis Número 1...40 Aniversario is a compilation album by Mexican singer and songwriter Juan Gabriel, released on August 5, 2014. The album has been nominated for Album of the Year at the Latin American Music Awards of 2015.

== Track listing ==
All tracks are written by Juan Gabriel.

No.	Title	Length
1.	"No Tengo Dinero"	3:04
2.	"Te Voy a Olvidar"	3:24
3.	"Siempre en Mi Mente"	3:27
4.	"He Venido a Perdirte Perdón"	4:58
5.	"Inocente Pobre Amigo"	4:06
6.	"El Noa Noa"	4:18
7.	"Yo No Nací Para Amar"	4:28
8.	"La Diferencia"	3:19
9.	"Ya Lo Sé Que Tú Te Vas"	3:45
10.	"No Me Vuelvo a Enamorar"	3:20
11.	"No Vale la Pena"	2:32
12.	"La Farsante"	2:55
13.	"Querida"	5:27
14.	"Si Quieres"	4:14
15.	"Hasta Que Te Conocí"	7:11
16.	"Te lo Pido Por Favor"	3:39
17.	"Pero Que Necesidad"	5:53
18.	"Se Me Olvidó Otra Vez"	2:57
19.	"Te Sigo Amando"	2:48
20.	"Abrázame Muy Fuerte"	3:59

== Charts ==
=== Weekly charts ===
Chart (2014–2016)	Peak position
US Billboard 200	28
US Top Latin Albums (Billboard)	1
US Latin Pop Albums (Billboard)	1

=== Year-end charts ===
Chart (2014)	Position
US Top Latin Albums (Billboard)	24
Chart (2015)	Position
US Top Latin Albums (Billboard)	5
Chart (2016)	Position
US Top Latin Albums (Billboard)	35
Chart (2017)	Position
US Top Latin Albums (Billboard)	24
Chart (2018)	Position
US Top Latin Albums (Billboard)	33
Chart (2019)	Position
US Top Latin Albums (Billboard)	64
