= ¿Y cómo es él? (song) =

Song by José Luis Perales

Single by José Luis Perales

from the album Entre el agua y el fuego
- Released: 1982
- Genre: Latin ballad
- Label: Hispavox
- Songwriter: José Luis Perales
- Producers: Rafael Trabucchelli, Danilo Vaona

José Luis Perales singles chronology
| "Por Amor" (1981) | "¿Y cómo es él?" (1982) | "Mientras duermen los niños" (1986) |

"¿Y cómo es él?"

Single by Marc Anthony

from the album Iconos
- Released: 12 April 2010
- Genre: Latin pop
- Label: Sony Music Latin
- Songwriter: José Luis Perales
- Producer: Julio Reyes Copello

Marc Anthony singles chronology
| "Armada Latina" (2010) | "¿Y cómo es él?" (2010) | "Abrázame Muy Fuerte" (2010) |

"¿Y cómo es él?" (Spanish for And what is he like?) is a song composed in 1981 by José Luis Perales and released in 1982.

The song was originally composed for Julio Iglesias and it has been covered by Raphael among others. In 2010, American singer Marc Anthony covered "¿Y cómo es él?" on his album Iconos. It was released as the lead single from the album and peaked at number 38 on the Hot Latin Songs chart. Anthony and Perales performed the song together live at the 11th Annual Latin Grammy Awards in 2010. With over 200,000 copies sold, it became one of the best-selling songs in Colombia.

== Charts ==
| Chart (1983) | Peak position |
|---|---|
| Argentina (CAPIF) | 1 |
