= Juan Gabriel Dúos & Interpretaciones =

Compilation album by Juan Gabriel
- Released: March 25, 2016
- Genre: Latin
- Label: Sony Music Latin
- Producer: Juan Gabriel

Juan Gabriel chronology
Mis Número 1...40 Aniversario (2014)	Juan Gabriel Dúos & Interpretaciones (2016)	Mi Historia Musical (2016)

Juan Gabriel Dúos & Interpretaciones is a compilation album released by Juan Gabriel on March 25, 2016. The album features many artists performing Juan Gabriel's songs and duets with him.

== Track listing ==
All tracks are written by Juan Gabriel.

No.	Title	Length
1.	"Te Quiero Mucho, Mucho" (featuring Rocío Dúrcal)	3:34
2.	"Abrázame Muy Fuerte" (performed by Marc Anthony)	4:32
3.	"Amor Aventurero" (featuring Ana Gabriel)	2:58
4.	"Se Me Olvidó Otra Vez" (performed by Julio Iglesias)	3:01
5.	"Qué Ganaste Corazon?" (featuring José José)	3:31
6.	"La Muerte del Palomo" (performed by Yuridia)	3:22
7.	"Se Me Olvidó Otra Vez"	2:55
8.	"Mañana Mañana (Primera Fila Live Version)" (performed by Cristian Castro)	3:59
9.	"Oh! Carolina" (featuring Julio Preciado)	3:00
10.	"Me Gusta Estar Contigo" (performed by Sergio Vega)	2:17
11.	"Por Mi Orgullo"	2:17
12.	"Ya Lo Se Que Tu Te Vas" (performed by Alejandro Fernández)	2:22
13.	"Hasta Que Te Conoci" (featuring Raúl di Blasio)	7:01
14.	"Querida" (performed by Chayanne)	4:36
15.	"Adorable Mentirosa"	2:39
16.	"Asi Fue" (performed by Isabel Pantoja)	5:30
17.	"17 Años" (featuring María Victoria)	3:09
18.	"Te Lo Pido Por Favor" (performed by Jaguares)	3:25
19.	"Mañana Mañana" (featuring Estela Nuñez)	2:49
20.	"Ya No Me Interesas" (performed by Lucha Villa)	3:03

== Charts ==
=== Weekly charts ===
Chart (2016)	Peak position
US Top Latin Albums (Billboard)	5
US Regional Mexican Albums (Billboard)	1

=== Year-end charts ===
Chart (2016)	Peak position
US Top Latin Albums (Billboard)	32
US Regional Mexican Albums (Billboard)	17
