= Mis Favoritas (Juan Gabriel album) =

Compilation album by Juan Gabriel
- Released: June 8, 2010
- Genre: Latin pop, Mariachi
- Length: 61:44
- Label: Sony BMG

Juan Gabriel chronology
Mis Canciones, Mis Amigos (2009)	Mis Favoritas (2010)	Boleros (2010)

Mis Favoritas ("My Favorites") is the title of a compilation album released by Mexican singer-songwriter Juan Gabriel on June 8, 2010.

== Track listing ==
No.	Title	Length
1.	"Querida"	5:25
2.	"Perdoname, Olvidalo with Rocío Dúrcal"	3:36
3.	"Hasta Que Te Conocí"	7:11
4.	"Todo Esta Bien"	3:45
5.	"Me He Quedado Solo (Gutomino Qireina Anoco Version)"	2:57
6.	"Que Bello Es El Amor with Estela Nuñez"	3:08
7.	"Es Mi Vida"	3:16
8.	"Adorable Mentirosa"	2:38
9.	"Pero Qué Necesidad"	5:50
10.	"De Mi Enamorate"	4:35
11.	"El Principio"	7:15
12.	"No Tengo Dinero (Canega Nai Queledo Mo Version)"	3:30
13.	"El Noa Noa"	4:13
14.	"Abrázame Muy Fuerte (Dance Remix)"	4:31
