= Vivir Mi Vida World Tour =

2013 concert tour by Marc Anthony

- World tour by Marc Anthony
- Associated album: 3.0
- Start date: August 6, 2013
- End date: December 18, 2013
- Legs: 2
- No. of shows: 43

Marc Anthony concert chronology
- Gigant3s Tour (2012); Vivir Mi Vida World Tour (2013)

The Vivir Mi Vida World Tour was a concert tour by American singer-songwriter Marc Anthony. The tour, in support of his album 3.0, is promoted by Cardenas Marketing Network. The tour was sponsored by Corona Extra. The opening acts were Arcangel and comedian Johnny Vega (New York). The first two shows sold out.

== Setlist ==
This setlist represents the setlist of the September 1, 2013 show in Long Island, New York at Nassau Coliseum.

1. "I Need to Know"
2. "Y Hubo Alguien"
3. "Hasta Ayer"
4. "Valió la Pena"
5. "Volando Entre Tus Brazos"
6. "Contra La Corriente"
7. "Y Como Es El"
8. "Vivir Lo Nuestro"
9. "Que Precio Tiene El Cielo"
10. "Hasta Que Te Conocí"
11. "Te Conozco Bien"
12. "Mi Gente"
  Encore
13. "Tu Amor Me Hace Bien"
14. "Vivir Mi Vida"

== Tour dates ==
Date	City	Country	Venue
Leg 1 — The Americas
August 6, 2013	Medellín	Colombia	Estadio de Envigado
August 9, 2013	Bogotá	Colombia	Estadio Simon Bolivar
August 14, 2013	Santa Cruz	Bolivia	Estadio Aguilera
August 17, 2013	Callao	Peru	Estadio Miguel Grau
August 23, 2013	Miami	United States	American Airlines Arena
August 24, 2013	Miami	United States	American Airlines Arena
August 25, 2013	Orlando	United States	Amway Center
August 30, 2013	Curaçao	Curaçao	North Sea Jazz Festival
September 1, 2013	Uniondale	United States	Nassau Veterans Memorial Coliseum
September 5, 2013	Houston	United States	Toyota Center
September 7, 2013	Rosemont	United States	Allstate Arena
September 8, 2013	Toronto	Canada	Venue TBA
September 10, 2013	Vienna	United States	Wolf Trap
September 13, 2013	Las Vegas	United States	Mandalay Bay
September 14, 2013	Tucson	United States	Anselmo Valencia Tori Amphitheater
September 20, 2013	Cali	Colombia	Rumbodromo del Sur
September 21, 2013	Bucaramanga	Colombia	Plaza de Toros
September 27, 2013	Oakland	United States	Oracle Arena
September 28, 2013	Los Angeles	United States	Nokia Theatre
September 29, 2013	Los Angeles	United States	Nokia Theatre
October 3, 2013	San Juan	Puerto Rico	Coliseo de Puerto Rico José Miguel Agrelot
October 4, 2013	San Juan	Puerto Rico	Coliseo de Puerto Rico José Miguel Agrelot
October 5, 2013	San Juan	Puerto Rico	Coliseo de Puerto Rico José Miguel Agrelot
October 15, 2013	Panama City	Panama	Figali Convention Center
October 19, 2013	Guadalajara	Mexico	Arena VFG
October 23, 2013	Mexico City	Mexico	Auditorio Nacional
October 24, 2013	Mexico City	Mexico	Auditorio Nacional
October 25, 2013	Mexico City	Mexico	Auditorio Nacional
November 1, 2013	Cuenca	Ecuador	Estadio Serrano Aguilar
November 2, 2013	Cuenca	Ecuador	Estadio Serrano Aguilar
November 6, 2013	Santiago	Chile	Arena Movistar
November 8, 2013	Mostazal	Chile	Casino Monticello
November 10, 2013	Asunción	Paraguay	Club Olimpia
November 14, 2013	Montevideo	Uruguay	Estadio Centenario
November 16, 2013	Buenos Aires	Argentina	Estadio G.E.B.A.
November 17, 2013	Buenos Aires	Argentina	Estadio G.E.B.A.
November 19, 2013	Lima	Peru	Estadio Nacional de Lima
December 3, 2013	Maracaibo	Venezuela	Palacio de Eventos de Venezuela
December 4, 2013	Valencia	Venezuela	Forum
December 5, 2013	Caracas	Venezuela	Poliedro de Caracas
Leg 2 — Australia (removed from tour dates)
December 12, 2013	Brisbane	Australia	Brisbane Entertainment Centre
December 13, 2013	Sydney	Australia	Sydney Entertainment Centre
December 15, 2013	Melbourne	Australia	Hisense Arena
December 18, 2013	Adelaide	Australia	Adelaide Entertainment Centre
February 25, 2014	Managua	Nicaragua	Nicaragua National Football Stadium
