= Los Gabriel... Para ti =

Compilation album by Juan & Ana Gabriel
- Released: 29 April 2008 (Mexico)
- Recorded: 2008
- Genre: Pop; Ranchera; Regional; Corrido
- Label: Sony BMG Latin

Ana Gabriel Compilations chronology
Los Gabriel: Cantan a México (2008)	Los Gabriel... Para ti (2008)

Juan Gabriel chronology
Los Gabriel: Cantan a México (2008)	Los Gabriel... Para ti (2008)	El Divo Canta A México (2008)

Los Gabriel: Para ti (English The Gabriel: For you) is a compilation album by Mexican singers Ana Gabriel and Juan Gabriel. After the success of the romantic album Los Gabriel… Simplemente Amigos, edited in 2007, and Los Gabriel: Cantan a México regional genre cd, edited in 2008, Sony BMG Latin presents a package of this two collections.

== Track listing ==
=== CD 1 ===
1. Querida - Juan Gabriel
2. Te lo Pido Por Favor - Juan Gabriel
3. Siempre en Mi Mente - Juan Gabriel
4. Que Lástima! - Juan Gabriel
5. He Venido a Pedirte Perdón - Juan Gabriel
6. Inocente de Ti - Juan Gabriel
7. Pero que Necesidad - Juan Gabriel
8. Hasta que Te Conoci - Juan Gabriel

=== CD 2 ===
1. La Diferencia - Juan Gabriel
2. Se Me Olvidó Otra Vez - Juan Gabriel
3. La Farsante - Juan Gabriel
4. Inocente Pobre Amigo - Juan Gabriel
5. No Vale La Pena - Juan Gabriel
6. Te Sigo Amando - Juan Gabriel
7. Canción 187 - Juan Gabriel
8. Adorable Mentirosa - Juan Gabriel

== Album Charts ==
#	Chart	United States Peak Position
1.	"Lat. Pop Albums"	#9
2.	"Top Lat. Albums"	#32

- Note: This release reached the #9 position in Billboard Latin Pop Albums staying for 10 weeks and it reached the #32 position in the Billboard Top Latin Albums staying for 7 weeks in the chart.
