= Otra Nota =

Studio album by Marc Anthony
- Released: January 26, 1993
- Recorded: 1992–93
- Studio: Active Recordings (New York City)
- Genre: Salsa
- Length: 37:01
- Languages: Spanish; English
- Label: RMM
- Producer: Sergio George

Marc Anthony chronology
When the Night is Over (1991)	Otra Nota (1993)	Todo a Su Tiempo (1995)

Singles from Otra Nota
- 1. "Hasta Que Te Conocí" Released: 1993; 2. "Palabras del Alma" Released: 1993; 3. "Si Tú No Te Fueras" Released: 1993

Otra Nota (English: Another Note) is the debut studio album by American singer Marc Anthony that was released on January 26, 1993, by RMM Records. Produced by Sergio George, it was the first album by Anthony to record in salsa after starting his career as a freestyle musician. Recording of the album began after Anthony asked RMM president Ralph Mercado to record Juan Gabriel's "Hasta Que Te Conocí" in salsa after hearing it on the radio during a taxi ride. Recorded on a low budget, the album peaked at No. 2 on the Billboard Tropical Albums chart and reached No. 30 on the Billboard Top Latin Albums chart.

The album was well received by critics who complimented George's production and Anthony's youthful voice. Anthony received two awards for "Best New Artists" at the Billboard Latin Music Awards and the Lo Nuestro Awards. The album produced three singles: "Hasta Que Te Conocí", "Palabras del Alma", and "Si Tú No Te Fueras", all of which charted on the Billboard Hot Latin Songs chart. As of 2002, Otra Nota has sold over 300,000 copies.

== Background ==
Marc Anthony began his recording career in 1980s as a freestyle musician during which he was a backup vocalist for boy bands such as Menudo and the Latin Rascals. Anthony also wrote songs for his school friend Sa-Fire, including "Boy I've Been Told" which became a hit on the Billboard Hot 100 chart. Anthony got his start as a lead vocalist when he collaborated with Little Louie Vega on the album When the Night Is Over. The lead single "Ride on the Rhythm" became a number-one hit on the Billboard Hot Dance Club Songs chart.

RMM manager Ralph Mercado invited Anthony to record a salsa album, but Anthony declined the offer due to a lack of interest to record in Spanish. The following day, while in a taxi, Anthony was listening to Juan Gabriel's song "Hasta Que Te Conocí" ("Until I Met You") on the radio and was motivated to record the song in salsa and told Mercado about his change of mind. Mercado introduced Anthony to Sergio George who would produce the album. According to George, the album was a "total experiment", citing that it was on low budget, recorded with one musician at a time without a band, and the full production was done on computers while George handled the keyboards. Otra Nota recording took place at the Active Recordings in New York City in 1992.

== Music and lyrics ==
Marc Anthony "Hasta Que Te Conocí" (1993)
A sample of the lead single, "Hasta Que Te Conocí" a cover of Juan Gabriel's song.

The album includes five compositions and three cover songs. The lead track "Palabras del Alma" ("Words from the Soul") is a cover originally performed and written by Ilan Chester. "Si Tú No Te Fueras" ("If You Would Not Leave") was composed by Nelson Frank and Jaime Gutierrez. "Hasta Que Te Conocí" was first performed and written by Juan Gabriel. "El Último Beso" ("The Last Kiss") was composed by Anthony's father Felipe Muñíz. "Make It With You" is a cover of American band Bread's song. "Necesito Amarte" ("I Need to Love You") was written by Luis Castillo who composed songs for RMM recording artists including José Alberto "El Canario" and Tito Nieves. Sergio George co-wrote "¿Juego O Amor?" ("Game or Love?") along with Adam Sez. The final track, "Si He de Morir" ("If I Were to Die") was composed by Dominican Luis "Terror" Díaz.

== Commercial reception ==
Otra Nota debuted and peaked at No. 2 on the Billboard Tropical Albums chart during the week of April 17, 1993, behind Jerry Rivera's Cuenta Conmigo and remained at this position for eight weeks. During the week of June 11, 1994, the album debuted and peaked at No. 30 on the Billboard Top Latin Albums, where it spent nineteen weeks on the chart. Otra Nota had sold over 300,000 copies as of 2002.

=== Singles ===
"Hasta Que Te Conocí" was the first single to be released from the album and peaked at No. 13 on the Billboard Hot Latin Songs chart. The second single "Palabras del Alma" peaked at No. 15 on the Billboard Hot Latin Songs chart. "Si Tú No Te Fueras" was the last single released from the album which peaked at No. 31 on the Billboard Hot Latin Songs chart.

== Critical reception ==
Professional ratings
Review scores
Source	Rating
AllMusic	3.5/5 stars
Los Angeles Times	3/4 stars

Evan Gutierrez of AllMusic complemented Anthony's voice as "developed, unique, and individual" and felt that Anthony's debut "brought quality and passion to his listeners from the beginning." Gutierrez also found the songs in salsa enjoyable while calling the ballads. Gutierrez praised Sergio George's arrangements as "outstanding" though he felt the production was outdated in places. An editor for Billboard magazine referred to the album as a "smashing salsa premier" and praised George's "customary fine" arrangements. The Los Angeles Times music critic Enrique Lopetegui gave the album 3 out of 4 stars, noting that while Anthony was viewed with skepticism on the salsa market, he felt that Anthony "may be the best of the many newborn salseros." Lopetegui also praised Anthony's vocals as "excellent" and described the overall album as "noble effort" though he criticized Anthony's cover of "Make It With You" as unnecessary. The album led to Anthony receiving a Billboard Latin Music Award for "Tropical/Salsa New Artist of the Year" and the Lo Nuestro Award for Tropical New Artist of the Year in 1994.

== Track listing ==
No.	Title	Writer(s)	Length
1.	"Palabras del Alma"	Ilan Chester	5:00
2.	"Si Tú No Te Fueras"	Nelson Frank, Jaime Gutierrez	4:28
3.	"Hasta Que Te Conocí"	Juan Gabriel	5:00
4.	"El Último Beso"	Felipe Muñíz	4:29
5.	"Make It with You"	David Gates	4:19
6.	"Necesito Amarte"	Luis Castillo	4:56
7.	"¿Juego o Amor?"	Sergio George, Adam Sez	4:33
8.	"Si He de Morir"	Luis Díaz	4:16

== Personnel ==
The following credits are from AllMusic.

=== Musicians ===
- Bobby Allende – bongos
- Gabriela Anders – background vocals
- Luis Bonilla – trombone
- Lucho Cabarcas – background vocals
- William Cepeda – trombone
- Ray Colon – bongos
- José Garcia – arranger, guitar, tres ("Necesito Amarte")
- Sergio George – arranger, keyboards, background vocals
- Phil Hamilton – guitar ("Juego o Amor", "Make it With You")
- Ite Jerez – trumpet
- Renaldo Jorge – trombone
- Lewis Kahn – violin
- Joe King – background vocals
- Rene Leyva – horn arrangements ("Necesito Amarte")
- Luis Lopez – trombone
- Pablo "Chino" Nuñez – timbales
- Papo Pepin – congas, percussion
- Johnny Rivera – background vocals
- Piro Rodriguez – trumpet
- Rubén Rodríguez – bass

=== Technical ===
- J. Albelo – artwork, design
- Phil Austin – mastering
- Ricardo Betancourt – photography
- Sergio George – drum programming, engineer, keyboards, mastering, producer, programming
- David Maldonado – executive Producer
- Elena C. Martínez – art direction
- Ralph Mercado – executive Producer
- Kurt Upper – engineer, mixing

== Chart performance ==
=== Weekly charts ===
Chart (1993)	Peak position
U.S. Billboard Top Latin Albums	30
U.S. Billboard Tropical Albums	2

=== Year-end charts ===
Chart (1993)	Peak position
U.S. Billboard Tropical Albums	14
Chart (1994)	Peak position
U.S. Billboard Tropical Albums	7

== See also ==
- 1993 in Latin music
