= Celebrando (disambiguation) =

Celebrando may refer to:

- Celebrando, album by Milly Quezada, Milly, Jocelyn y los Vecinos
- Celebrando (Juan Gabriel album)
- "Celebrando", by the Costa Rican band Marfil

== See also ==
- Celebrando Al Príncipe compilation album by Mexican pop singer Cristian Castro
