= Mi Historia Musical (Juan Gabriel album) =

Compilation album by Juan Gabriel
- Released: August 26, 2016
- Genre: Latin
- Label: Sony Music Entertainment
- Producer: Juan Gabriel

Juan Gabriel chronology
Juan Gabriel Dúos & Interpretaciones (2016)	Mi Historia Musical (2016)

Mi Historia Musical is a compilation album released by Juan Gabriel on August 26, 2016, two days before his death.

== Disc 1 ==
All tracks are written by Juan Gabriel

No.	Title	Length
1.	"Hasta Que Te Conocí"	7:13
2.	"Te Sigo Amando"	2:49
3.	"Inocente Pobre Amigo"	4:06
4.	"Se Me Olvidó Otra Vez"	2:58
5.	"La Muerte del Palomo"	3:29
6.	"El Destino" (featuring Rocío Dúrcal)	4:45
7.	"Mis Ojos Tristes"	3:52
8.	"Que Sea Mi Condena"	3:12
9.	"Si Dios Me Ayuda"	3:02
10.	"Siempre Estoy Pensando en Ti"	3:32
11.	"Yo Te Perdono"	3:00
12.	"No Me Vuelvo a Enamorar" (Remastered)	3:20
13.	"Noche a Noche" (Remastered)	2:59
14.	"Ya Lo Sé Que Tú Te Vas"	3:44
15.	"Cosas de Enamorados"	3:27
16.	"De Sol a Sol" (A Mis Padres)	4:09
17.	"Fue un Placer Conocerte" (featuring Rocío Dúrcal)	3:10
18.	"Amor Eterno" (En Vivo Desde el Instituto Nacional de Bellas Artes)	7:07

== Disc 2 ==
All tracks are written by Juan Gabriel

No.	Title	Length
1.	"El Noa Noa" (Remastered)	4:20
2.	"Querida"	5:23
3.	"Pero Qué Necesidad"	5:25
4.	"Así Fue" (En Vivo)	7:25
5.	"He Venido a Pedirte Perdón"	4:59
6.	"La Más Querida"	2:37
7.	"Lentamente"	3:28
8.	"No Tengo Dinero"	3:07
9.	"Como Amigos"	3:30
10.	"Siempre en Mi Mente"	3:27
11.	"Rosenda"	3:05
12.	"Te Lo Pido Por Favor"	3:40
13.	"Yo No Nací para Amar"	4:29
14.	"No Puedo Olvidar"	3:46
15.	"De Mí Enamórate" (En Vivo Desde el Instituto Nacional de Bellas Artes)	4:31
16.	"Abrázame Muy Fuerte"	4:02
17.	"Debo Hacerlo"	9:39

== Charts ==
=== Weekly charts ===
Chart (2016)	Peak position
Mexican Albums (AMPROFON)	5
US Latin Pop Albums (Billboard)	18

=== Year-end charts ===
Chart (2016)	Peak position
Mexican Albums (AMPROFON)	17
Chart (2017)	Peak position
Mexican Albums (AMPROFON)	82
