= Mis Favoritas =

Mis Favoritas may refer to:

- Mis Favoritas (Juan Gabriel album), 2010
- Mis Favoritas (Toby Love album), 2012
- Mis Favoritas (Víctor Manuelle album), 2010
- Mis Canciones Favoritas, a 2003 album by Chenoa
