= Iconos =

Studio album by Marc Anthony
- Released: May 25, 2010
- Recorded: 2009–10
- Genre: Latin pop
- Length: 43:24
- Label: Sony Music Latin
- Producer: Marc Anthony; Julio Reyes Copello

Marc Anthony chronology
El Cantante (2007)	Iconos (2010)	3.0 (2013)

Singles from Iconos
- 1. "Y cómo es el" Released: April 12, 2010; 2. "Abrázame muy fuerte" Released: August 16, 2010; 3. "A quien quiero mentirle" Released: November 29, 2010; 4. "El triste" Released: February 14, 2011

Iconos (English: Icons) is the eighth Spanish album and tenth studio album by Marc Anthony which covers Latin ballads from the past and is the second Latin pop album by Marc Anthony after Amar Sin Mentiras. The album was first released on May 14, 2010 in Europe through Ariola Records, and May 25 in the US and UK with Sony Latin.

== Album information ==
The album is produced by himself and Julio Reyes. It also features eight cover versions and two previously unreleased songs that were composed by Julio Reyes. The album includes covers by singers José José, Juan Gabriel, Roberto Carlos, La Mafia as well José Luis Perales, singer and composer from the lead single.

The first single released from the album was "Y Cómo Es Él" (What Is He Like?), a song which was first recorded and written by José Luis Perales. It was revealed on April 8, 2010, and released as digital download on April 12, 2010 through Sony Music.

The second single from the album was Abrázame Muy Fuerte (Embrace Me Tightly), a song from Mexican singer Juan Gabriel. This is the second single by Marc Anthony where he covered a song by Juan Gabriel since his cover of Hasta Que Te Conocí.

About the difficulty of singing "El Triste", Anthony stated that "once you start to sing it you realize the magnitude, of that spectacular voice and special phrasing of José José and his incredible way to perform."

Regarding the decision to make a tribute album, Anthony commented that these songs stood through the test of time and "they just don't write songs like this anymore... I wanted to celebrate artists that had the guts at the time to be so daring".

== Reception ==
Professional ratings
Review scores
Source	Rating
Allmusic	3/5 stars

Jason Birchmeier of Allmusic gave the album a mixed review. While he praised Marc Anthony's vocals and calling the album first-rate, he criticized Anthony for the lack of originality since Amar Sin Mentiras. Regarding the single, "Y Cómo Es Él", Birchmeier noted that Anthony's passion for the album is evident in the single and concluded that "Anthony may not give fans what they want, but at least he gives them quality material".

== Track listing ==
No.	Title	Writer(s)	Original Performer	Length
1.	"Almohada"	Jorge Adán Torres	José José	4:21
2.	"El Triste"	Roberto Cantoral	José José	5:19
3.	"Y Cómo Es Él"	José Luis Perales	José Luis Perales	4:00
4.	"Abrázame Muy Fuerte"	Juan Gabriel	Juan Gabriel	4:34
5.	"Te Lo Pido Por favor"	Juan Gabriel	Juan Gabriel	3:27
6.	"Amada Amante"	Roberto Carlos	Roberto Carlos	3:56
7.	"Vida"	Armando Larrinaga	La Mafia	4:39
8.	"Ya Lo Sé Que Tú Te Vas"	Juan Gabriel	Juan Gabriel	4:54
9.	"A Quién Quiero Mentirle"	Julio Reyes	Previously unreleased	4:13
10.	"Maldita Sea Mi Suerte"	Julio Reyes	Previously unreleased	4:01
Total length:				43:24

== Chart performance ==
Chart (2010)	Peak position
Chilean Albums Chart	2
European Top 100 Albums	38
Mexican Albums Chart	3
Spanish Albums Chart	1
US Billboard 200	11
US Billboard Top Latin Albums	1
US Billboard Latin Pop Albums	1
US Billboard Digital Albums	19
Venezuelan Albums (Recordland)	1

== Sales and certifications ==
Region	Certification	Certified units/sales
Mexico (AMPROFON)	Platinum	60,000^{^}
United States (RIAA)	5× Platinum (Latin)	300,000^{‡}
^{^} Shipments figures based on certification alone.^{‡} Sales+streaming figures based on certification alone.

== Release history ==
Region	Date	Label
Germany	May 14, 2010	Ariola Records
Switzerland	May 14, 2010	Ariola Records
Austria	May 14, 2010	Ariola Records
United Kingdom	May 25, 2010	Sony Music Latin
United States	May 25, 2010	Sony Music Latin

== See also ==
- List of number-one albums of 2010 (Spain)
- List of number-one Billboard Latin Pop Albums of 2010
- List of number-one Billboard Latin Albums from the 2010s
