= El Divo Canta A México =

Live album by Juan Gabriel
- Released: October 21, 2008
- Genre: Pop Latino, Mariachi
- Label: Sony BMG Latin
- Producer: Juan Gabriel

Juan Gabriel chronology
Los Gabriel... Para ti (2008)	El Divo Canta A México (2008)	Mis Canciones, Mis Amigos (2009)

El Divo Canta A México (The Divo sings to Mexico) is the title of a live album released by Mexican singer-songwriter Juan Gabriel on October 21, 2008. This live album was released in two formats CD and DVD.

== Track listing ==
All tracks are written by Juan Gabriel

No.	Title	Length
1.	"La Farsante"	2:56
2.	"Todo"	2:29
3.	"No Vale La Pena"	2:33
4.	"Caray"	3:51
5.	"Se Me Olvidó Otra Vez with El Mariachi Vargas De Tecalitlan"	2:58
6.	"Con Todo Y Mi Tristeza"	3:54
7.	"Inocente Pobre Amigo with Mariachi America De Jesús Rodríguez de Híjar"	4:06
8.	"Te Voy A Olvidar with Mariachi Mexico 70 De Pepe Lopez"	3:27
9.	"Te Sigo Amando with Mariachi America De Jesús Rodríguez de Híjar"	2:50
10.	"La Diferencia"	3:19
11.	"Lagrimas y Lluvia"	3:07
12.	"Adorable Mentirosa"	2:41
13.	"Cancion 187 with Mariachi De Mi Tierra"	2:08
14.	"Cuando Quieras... Dejame"	3:04
15.	"El Destino with Rocío Dúrcal"	4:45
16.	"El Sinaloense"	3:09

== Charts ==
Chart (2008)	Peak position
US Top Latin Albums (Billboard)	16
US Regional Mexican Albums (Billboard)	8
