= Mis Canciones, Mis Amigos =

Compilation album by Juan Gabriel
- Released: October 6, 2009
- Genre: Pop Latino, Mariachi
- Label: RCA
- Producer: Juan Gabriel

Juan Gabriel chronology
| El Divo Canta A México (2008) | Mis Canciones, Mis Amigos (2009) | Mis Favoritas (2010) |

Mis Canciones, Mis Amigos ("My Songs, My Friends") is the title of a Compilation album released by Mexican singer-songwriter Juan Gabriel on October 6, 2009. This is a 2-disc compilation album, with the first disc featuring Juan Gabriel songs and the second disc featuring songs that Juan Gabriel wrote that were covered by other artists.

== Track listing ==
=== Disc 1 ===
| No. | Title | Length |
|---|---|---|
| 1. | "El Noa Noa" | 4:16 |
| 2. | "Aunque Te Enamores" | 3:38 |
| 3. | "Yo No Se Que Me Paso" | 5:12 |
| 4. | "Buenos Dias Señor Sol" | 2:41 |
| 5. | "Yo No Naci Para Amar" | 4:28 |
| 6. | "Te Lo Pido Por Favor" | 3:39 |
| 7. | "Mi Pueblo ("My Home Town") (with Paul Anka)" | 3:01 |
| 8. | "Abrázame Muy Fuerte" | 4:01 |
| 9. | "Solo Se Que Fue En Marzo" | 4:06 |
| 10. | "Debo Hacerlo" | 9:36 |

=== Disc 2 ===
| No. | Title | Length |
|---|---|---|
| 1. | "Querida - Chayanne" | 4:38 |
| 2. | "Costumbres - Lupita D'Alessio" | 4:29 |
| 3. | "Ya Lo Se Que Tu Te Vas - Alejandro Fernández" | 2:25 |
| 4. | "Lagrimas y Lluvia - Estela Nuñez" | 3:27 |
| 5. | "Amor Eterno - Rocío Dúrcal" | 6:50 |
| 6. | "Tu Sigues Siendo El Mismo - Angélica María" | 4:32 |
| 7. | "Luna - Ana Gabriel" | 4:32 |
| 8. | "No Se Ha Dado Cuenta - Roberto Jordan" | 2:37 |
| 9. | "Lo Pasado Pasado - José José" | 4:10 |
| 10. | "Hasta Que Te Conoci - Raul Di Blasio" | 7:02 |

== Charts ==
| Chart (2009) | Peak position |
|---|---|
| US Top Latin Albums (Billboard) | 9 |
| US Latin Pop Albums (Billboard) | 2 |
