= Los Gabriel... Simplemente Amigos =

Compilation album by Juan Gabriel and Ana Gabriel
- Released: 6 November 2007 (Mexico)
- Recorded: 2007
- Genre: Ranchera; Regional; Corrido
- Length: 70 min
- Label: Sony BMG Latin

Ana Gabriel Compilations chronology
Con Sentimiento (2006)	Los Gabriel... Simplemente Amigos (2007)	Los Gabriel: Cantan a México (2008)

Juan Gabriel chronology
La Historia del Divo (2004)	Los Gabriel... Simplemente Amigos (2007)	Los Gabriel: Cantan a México (2008)

Los Gabriel… Simplemente Amigos (English The Gabriel... Simply friends) is a compilation album by the Mexican singers Ana Gabriel and Juan Gabriel. It was released in 2007 under the label of Sony BMG Latin.

== Track listing ==
Tracks:

1. Quién Como Tú - Ana Gabriel
2. Querida - Juan Gabriel
3. Ay Amor - Ana Gabriel
4. Te lo Pido Por Favor - Juan Gabriel
5. Ni un Roce (Nem un Toque) - Ana Gabriel
6. Siempre en Mi Mente - Juan Gabriel
7. Simplemente Amigos - Ana Gabriel
8. Que Lástima! - Juan Gabriel
9. Es el Amor Quien LLega - Ana Gabriel
10. He Venido a Pedirte Perdón - Juan Gabriel
11. Evidencias - Ana Gabriel
12. Inocente de Ti - Juan Gabriel
13. Luna - Ana Gabriel
14. Pero que Necesidad - Juan Gabriel
15. Huelo a Soledad - Ana Gabriel
16. Hasta que Te Conoci - Juan Gabriel

== Album charts ==
#	Chart	U.S. Peak Position
1.	"Lat. Pop Albums"	#4
2.	"Top Lat. Albums"	#9
3.	" Billboard 200	#197

- Note: This release reached the #4 position in Billboard Latin Pop Albums staying for 49 weeks and it reached the #9 position in the Billboard Top Latin Albums staying for 3 weeks in the chart.
