= Los Gabriel: Cantan a México =

Los Gabriel: Cantan a Mexico

Compilation album by Juan & Ana Gabriel
- Released: March 25, 2008 (Mexico)
- Recorded: 2008
- Genre: Ranchera; Regional; Corrido
- Label: Sony BMG Latin

Ana Gabriel Compilations chronology
Los Gabriel… Simplemente Amigos (2007)	Los Gabriel: Cantan a Mexico (2008)	Los Gabriel... Para ti (2008)

Juan Gabriel chronology
Los Gabriel… Simplemente Amigos (2007)	Los Gabriel: Cantan a Mexico (2008)	Los Gabriel... Para ti (2008)

Los Gabriel: Cantan a México (English The Gabriel: Sing to Mexico) is a compilation album by Mexican singers Ana Gabriel and Juan Gabriel. After the success of the romantic album Los Gabriel… Simplemente Amigos, edited in 2007, Sony BMG Latin presents one more collection of their hits in the regional Mexican genre.

== Track listing ==
Tracks:

1. La Diferencia - Juan Gabriel
2. Y Aquí Estoy - Ana Gabriel
3. Se Me Olvidó Otra Vez - Juan Gabriel
4. Ahora - Ana Gabriel
5. La Farsante - Juan Gabriel
6. Amigo Mio (Homenaje A Juan Gabriel) - Ana Gabriel
7. Inocente Pobre Amigo - Juan Gabriel
8. Tú Lo Decidiste - Ana Gabriel
9. No Vale La Pena - Juan Gabriel
10. A Pesar de Todo - Ana Gabriel
11. Te Sigo Amando - Juan Gabriel
12. Huelo A Soledad - Ana Gabriel
13. Canción 187 - Juan Gabriel
14. Volver, Volver - Ana Gabriel
15. Adorable Mentirosa - Juan Gabriel
16. México Lindo y Querido - Ana Gabriel

== Charts ==
=== Weekly charts ===
Chart (2008)	Peak position
US Billboard 200	119
US Top Latin Albums (Billboard)	3
US Regional Mexican Albums (Billboard)	1

=== Year-end charts ===
Chart (2008)	Position
US Top Latin Albums (Billboard)	20
