= Baila Mi Rumba =

Single by José Luis Rodríguez "El Puma"

from the album Tengo Derecho a Ser Feliz
- Released: 1989
- Recorded: 1988–1989
- Genre: Latin dance
- Length: 6:31
- Label: CBS Discos
- Songwriter: Isidore York · Rudy Pérez · V.M. Hernández
- Producer: Emilio Estefan, Jr. · Rudy Pérez

José Luis Rodríguez "El Puma" singles chronology
"Yo Quiero Ser tu Amor" (1988)	"Baila Mi Rumba" (1989)	"Tengo Derecho a Ser Feliz" (1989)

"Baila Mi Rumba" ("Dance My Rumba") is a dance song written by Isidore York, Rudy Pérez and V. M. Hernández, produced by Pérez and Emilio Estefan, Jr., and performed by Venezuelan singer José Luis Rodríguez "El Puma". It was released in 1989 as the lead single from his studio album Tengo Derecho a Ser Feliz (1989), and became his second number-one single in the Billboard Hot Latin Tracks chart after "Y Tú También Llorarás" in 1987. The success of the song led its parent album to its peak at number two in the Billboard Latin Pop Albums.

"Baila Mi Rumba" is one of Rodríguez' signature songs and the recipient of a Grammy Award nomination for Best Latin Pop Performance, which it lost to José Feliciano's rendition of "Cielito Lindo". Often included on greatest hits collections by the singer, most of the time on edited versions, as in The Best of Jose Luis Rodríguez: Ultimate Collection where it was shortened from its original length of 6:31 to 3:22.

== Chart performance ==
The song debuted in the Billboard Hot Latin Tracks chart at number 33 in the week of April 29, 1989, climbing to the top ten four weeks later. "Baila Mi Rumba" peaked at number-one on July 15, 1989, on its twelfth week, holding this position for seven consecutive weeks, replacing "La Incondicional" by Luis Miguel and being replaced by Ana Gabriel with "Simplemente Amigos". It ranked second in the Hot Latin Tracks Year-End Chart of 1989, spent 29 weeks within the Top 40 in the United States, and has been covered by several performers including Beto y sus Canarios, Alfredo y sus Teclados and Tony Camargo.

=== Weekly charts ===
Chart (1989)	Peak position
Chile (IFPI)	3
Ecuador (UPI)	4
El Salvador (UPI)	9
Mexico (AMPROFON)	10
Panama (UPI)	1
Uruguay (UPI)	5
US Hot Latin Songs (Billboard)	1

== See also ==
- List of number-one Billboard Top Latin Songs from the 1980s
