= Mis 40 en Bellas Artes =

Live album by Juan Gabriel
- Released: May 6, 2014
- Recorded: August 31, 2013
- Genre: Latin, Mariachi
- Label: Fonovisa
- Producer: Juan Gabriel

Juan Gabriel chronology
Celebrando (2012)	Mis 40 en Bellas Artes (2014)	Mis Número 1...40 Aniversario (2014)

Mis 40 en Bellas Artes is a live album released by Juan Gabriel from Palacio de Bellas Artes in Mexico on May 6, 2014. A DVD is included with the album, showing Gabriel's performance and behind-the-scenes footage.

== Track list ==
All tracks written by Juan Gabriel.
Disc 1

No.	Title	Length
1.	"Obertura Paracuaro"	2:57
2.	"Mi Pueblito"	4:13
3.	"Querida"	5:31
4.	"Me Nace del Corazón"	1:46
5.	"Caray"	1:39
6.	"Esta Noche Voy a Verla"	2:41
7.	"Juntos"	3:00
8.	"Me Gustas Mucho"	3:41
9.	"Amor de un Rato"	3:08
10.	"La Diferencia"	3:37
11.	"No Discutamos"	2:18
12.	"Tu a Mi No Me Hundes"	3:38
13.	"Con Todo y Mi Tristeza"	3:16
14.	"Rondinella"	4:55
15.	"Maria José"	3:40
16.	"Del Olvido al No Me Acuerdo"	4:17
17.	"Insensible"	4:57
18.	"Tus Ojos Mexicanos Lindos"	4:18
19.	"Siempre en Mi Mente"	4:31

Disc 2

No.	Title	Length
1.	"Cuando Quieras Déjame"	4:26
2.	"Luna"	5:23
3.	"He Venido a Pedirte Perdón"	4:36
4.	"Abrázame Muy Fuerte"	6:18
5.	"Vienes o Voy"	7:57
6.	"Así Fue" (performed by Isabel Pantoja)	9:10
7.	"Déjame Vivir"	3:39
8.	"¿Por Qué Me Haces Llorar?"	3:22
9.	"Que No Diera Yo"	4:55
10.	"El Noa Noa"	7:17

== Charts ==
=== Weekly charts ===
Chart (2014)	Peak position
Mexican Albums (AMPROFON)	1
US Billboard 200	140
US Top Latin Albums (Billboard)	4
US Regional Mexican Albums (Billboard)	1

=== Year-end charts ===
Chart (2014)	Peak position
Mexican Albums (AMPROFON)	2
US Top Latin Albums (Billboard)	18
US Regional Mexican Albums (Billboard)	6
Chart (2015)	Peak position
Mexican Albums (AMPROFON)	17
US Top Latin Albums (Billboard)	67
Chart (2016)	Peak position
Mexican Albums (AMPROFON)	9
Chart (2017)	Peak position
Mexican Albums (AMPROFON)	33

=== Certification ===
Region	Certification	Certified units/sales
Mexico (AMPROFON)	2× Diamond	600,000^{‡}
United States (RIAA)	Gold (Latin)	30,000^{^}
^{^} Shipments figures based on certification alone.^{‡} Sales+streaming figures based on certification alone.
