= When the Night Is Over =

Studio album by Little Louie Vega and Marc Anthony
- Released: 1991
- Recorded: 1991
- Genre: Dance
- Label: Atlantic
- Producer: Masters at Work

Marc Anthony chronology
When the Night Is Over (1991)	Otra Nota (1993)

Singles from When the Night is Over
- 1. "Ride on the Rhythm" Released: August 13, 1991

When the Night Is Over is a collaboration album by Little Louie Vega and Marc Anthony, released in 1991. The album was done by the Masters at Work. It is also Marc Anthony's first album as an artist previously releasing a single-only record "Rebel". The album produced one single, "Ride on the Rhythm", which topped the dance music charts.

== Reception ==
Professional ratings
Review scores
Source	Rating
AllMusic	4/5 stars
The Encyclopedia of Popular Music	3/5 stars

John Bush of AllMusic praised the album as being a fusion of house music and salsa and called the single "Ride on the Rhythm" as worth the cost of the CD alone.

== Track listing ==
1. Ride on the Rhythm (4:04)
2. When the Night Is Over (5:41)
3. Walk Away (4:44)
4. If I Had the Opportunity (4:34)
5. Let Me Love You (4:57)
6. It's Alright (4:05)
7. The Name of the Game (6:04)
8. Living in a Strange World (5:35)
9. Time (5:43)
10. The Masters at Work (4:25)
11. Ride (6:39)
