= Simplemente Amigos =

Single by Ana Gabriel

from the album Tierra de Nadie
- Released: March 20, 1989
- Recorded: 1988
- Genre: Latin pop · Latin ballad
- Length: 3:49
- Label: Discos CBS International
- Songwriter: Ana Gabriel
- Producer: Mariano Pérez Bautista

Ana Gabriel singles chronology
"Es el Amor Quién Llega" (1988)	"Simplemente Amigos" (1989)	"No Digas No" (1989)

"Simplemente Amigos" (English: Just Friends) is a ballad written and performed by Mexican singer-songwriter Ana Gabriel and was produced by Mariano Pérez Bautista. It was released by CBS Discos (now Sony Music Latin) on March 20, 1989, as the second single from her fourth studio album Tierra de Nadie (1988). The song became Gabriel's second number-one single in the Billboard Hot Latin Tracks chart after "Ay Amor" in late 1987. The success of the song led its parent album to its peak at number one in the Billboard Latin Pop Albums and approximate sales of six million units in Latin America.

"Simplemente Amigos" is one of Gabriel's signature songs and one of the most covered songs, aside from being named her first smash hit. The song title was later used in a compilation album featuring songs by Gabriel and fellow Mexican singer-songwriter Juan Gabriel.

== Chart performance ==
The song debuted in the Billboard Hot Latin Tracks chart at number 36 in the week of May 20, 1989, climbing to the top ten two weeks later. "Simplemente Amigos" peaked at number-one on September 2, 1989, on its sixteenth week, holding this position for two consecutive weeks, replacing "Baila Mi Rumba" by Venezuelan performer José Luis Rodríguez "El Puma" and being replaced by Gloria Estefan with "Si Voy a Perderte". It ranked seventh in the Hot Latin Tracks Year-End Chart of 1989 and spent 29 weeks within the Top 40 in the United States. It also reached number one the Guatemalan Spanish Charts in the country.

== Cover versions ==
"Simplemente Amigos" is one of the most covered songs on Gabriel's repertoire. Banda Preciosa de Durango, BXS Bryndis X Siempre, Keyla Caballero, Calor del Norte, David Cedeno, Cumbia Na Na Na, Los Grey's, Grupo Secreto, Grupo Super T, Gary Hobbs, Iris, JC y Su Banda Duranguense, Junior Klan, Mónica, Nadia, Emilio Navaira, Quadra, Bienvenido Rodríguez, Oscar Rubio y su Banda Canela, Son de Azúcar, and Violento have recorded versions of the song. Mexican singer Myriam also did her version of the track and included it on her album Simplemente Amigos — a Tribute album to Ana Gabriel. This album peaked at number-one in the Mexican Albums Chart and received a gold certification in México for sales over 300,000 copies.

== Charts ==
=== Weekly charts ===
Weekly chart performance for "Simplemente Amigos"
Chart (1989)	Peak position
Ecuador (EFE)	8
El Salvador (EFE)	1
Mexico (AMPROFON)	3
Panama (EFE)	2
US Hot Latin Songs (Billboard)	1

== Certifications ==
Certifications for "Simplemente amigos"
Region	Certification	Certified units/sales
Mexico (AMPROFON)	Diamond+3× Platinum+Gold	510,000^{‡}
^{‡} Sales+streaming figures based on certification alone.
