= La Historia del Divo =

Compilation album by Juan Gabriel
- Released: April 4, 2006
- Genre: Pop Latino, Mariachi, Ranchera, Regional
- Label: Sony Int'l

La Historia del Divo (English: The History of the Divo) is a compilation album by Mexican singer Juan Gabriel release on April 4, 2006.

== Track listing ==
No.	Title	Length
1.	"Querida"	5:27
2.	"No Tengo Dinero"	3:03
3.	"Con Tu Amor"	4:05
4.	"Siempre En Mi Mente"	4:05
5.	"No Me Vuelvo a Enamorar"	3:19
6.	"Tú Sigues Siendo el Mismo"	4:25
7.	"No Vale la Pena"	2:30
8.	"Te Voy a Olvidar"	3:23
9.	"Se Me Olvidó Otra Vez"	2:56
10.	"La Diferencia"	3:19
11.	"Ya lo Sé Que Tú Te Vas"	3:34
12.	"Inocente Pobre Amigo"	4:20
13.	"Pero Qué Necesidad"	5:49
14.	"Abrazame Muy Fuerte"	3:55
15.	"Hasta Que Te Conocí"	7:30
16.	"Amor Eterno (En Vivo)"	7:07

== Charts and certifications ==
=== Weekly charts ===
Chart (2006–2007)	Peak position
Spanish Albums (PROMUSICAE)	76
US Billboard 200	92
US Top Latin Albums (Billboard)	4
US Latin Pop Albums (Billboard)	2

=== Year-end charts ===
Chart (2006)	Position
US Top Latin Albums (Billboard)	17

=== Certifications ===
Region	Certification	Certified units/sales
Mexico (AMPROFON)	Gold	50,000^{^}
^{^} Shipments figures based on certification alone.
