= Ride on the Rhythm =

Single by Little Louie Vega featuring Marc Anthony

from the album When the Night is Over
- Released: August 13, 1991
- Recorded: 1991
- Genre: House
- Length: 7:07 (extended version); 4:07 (album version)
- Label: Atlantic
- Songwriters: La India; Little Louie Vega
- Producers: Masters at Work; Todd Terry

Little Louie Vega singles chronology
"House of Vega" (1990)	"Ride on the Rhythm" (1991)	"Hip Hop Jazz EP" (1996)

Marc Anthony singles chronology
"Rebel" (1988)	"Ride on the Rhythm" (1991)	"Hasta Que Te Conocí" (1993)

"Ride on the Rhythm", is a song recorded by American DJ and record producer Little Louie Vega, released on August 13, 1991, by Atlantic Records. It features American singer Marc Anthony when he was still a freestyle musician.

== Legacy ==
This house classic would help establish the successful careers of Vega and partner Kenny "Dope" Gonzalez, who would later become more famous as Masters at Work, and for Marc Anthony, who picked up his first number one single on the Billboard Hot Dance Club Play chart. The track also featured backing rap vocals from Doug Lazy, Todd Terry on keyboards and co-production, The Basement Boys (the production team behind Crystal Waters and Ultra Naté) on piano and Luis Vega, Sr. on saxophone. This would also be the last single that Marc Anthony worked under freestyle genre before he signed with RMM to start his career as a salsero singer.

== Track listings ==
12" vinyl (US promo, 1991)

- A1. "Ride on the Rhythm" (Kenlou Rhythm Mix) – (7:08)
- A2. "Ride on the Rhythm" (Radio Mix Funky) – (4:05)
- B1. "Ride on the Rhythm" (Masters At Work Dub) – (6:16)
- B2. "Ride on the Rhythm" (The Ride) – (6:39)
- B3. "Ride on the Rhythm" (A cappella) – (0:30)

12" maxi CD (US, 1992)

- 1. "Ride on the Rhythm" (Radio Mix Funky) – (4:06)
- 2. "Ride on the Rhythm" (Funky '92 Re-Edit) – (7:25)
- 3. "Ride on the Rhythm" (Kenlou Rhythm Mix) – (7:09)
- 4. "The Masters at Work" (One Take Tito Mix) – (5:11)

== Chart performance ==
The single reached number one on the Billboard Hot Dance Club Play chart in the United States during the week ending October 5, 1991 and stayed there for only one week.

Chart (1991)	Peak position
U.S. Billboard Hot Dance Club Play	1
U.S. Billboard Hot Dance Singles Sales	4
UK Singles Chart	70

== Reception ==
John Bush of AllMusic felt the song was worth the cost of the album and calling it a "effortless dancefloor stormer".

== See also ==
List of number-one dance singles of 1991 (U.S.)
