= Celebrando =

Compilation album by Juan Gabriel
- Released: December 4, 2012
- Recorded: 1971–1972, 1975, 2012
- Label: Universal

Juan Gabriel chronology
Boleros (2010)	Celebrando (2012)	Mis 40 en Bellas Artes (2014)

Celebrando is a compilation album released by Juan Gabriel in 2012. The album features Los Hermanos Zavala.

== Track listing ==
All tracks are written by Juan Gabriel.

No.	Title	Length
1.	"Me He Quedado Solo, Otra Vez"	4:37
2.	"Ella No Me Quiere y Yo Si"	3:11
3.	"Por las Mañanas, Mariana"	4:11
4.	"Rosenda, No Me Olvides"	5:11
5.	"1,2 y 3 y Me Das Otro Beso Mas"	4:25
6.	"Yo No Digo Que Te Amo, Pero Si"	8:08
7.	"No Tengo Dinero Otra Vez"	3:49
8.	"A Mi Guitarra Con Mas Amor"	5:09
9.	"Aquella, Melodia, Mentiras"	4:03
10.	"Te Busco y Te Exraño Aun"	3:38
11.	"Sera Mañana, Osea Hoy"	4:51
12.	"A Los Zavala"	12:01
13.	"Celebrando"	10:57

== Charts ==
Chart (2012)	Peak position
US Top Latin Albums (Billboard)	44
US Regional Mexican Albums (Billboard)	18
