= Marc Anthony =

American singer (born 1968)

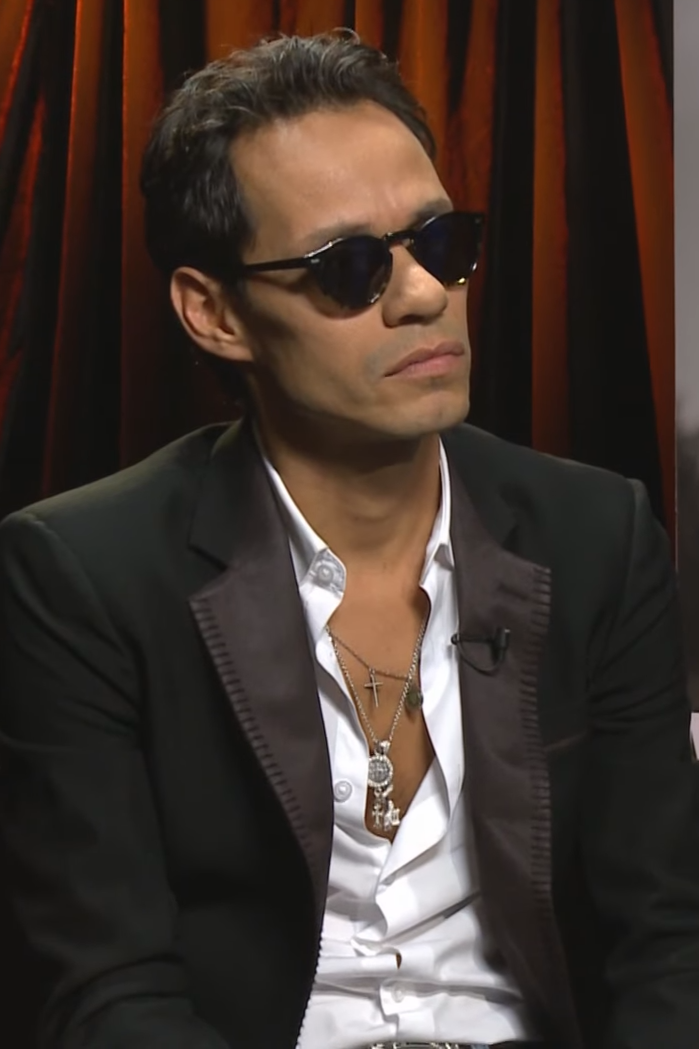
- Anthony in 2013
- Born: Marco Antonio Muñiz; September 16, 1968 (age 58); New York City, U.S.
- Occupations: Singer; songwriter; actor
- Years active: 1988–present
- Spouses: Dayanara Torres (m. 2000; div. 2004); Jennifer Lopez (m. 2004; div. 2014); Shannon De Lima (m. 2014; div. 2017); Nadia Ferreira (m. 2023)
- Children: 8
- Musical career
- Genres: Latin; salsa; tropical; freestyle; R&B; pop; soft rock
- Labels: Sony; Blue Dog; Atlantic; RMM; Columbia
- Website: marcanthonyonline.com

Marco Antonio Muñiz (born September 16, 1968), known by the stage name Marc Anthony, is an American singer and actor. The top-selling salsa artist of all time, he has won four Grammy Awards, eight Latin Grammy Awards, and 29 Lo Nuestro Awards. As of 2014, he had sold more than 12 million albums worldwide.

Known for his Latin salsa numbers and ballads, Anthony's achievements have been honored through various recognitions. He was the recipient of the 2009 Congressional Hispanic Caucus Institute (CHCI) Lifetime Achievement Award. He also received the 2009 CHCI Chair's Lifetime Achievement Award on September 16, 2009. He holds the Guinness World Record for best-selling tropical/salsa artist and the most number-one albums on the Billboard Tropical Albums year-end charts. He is also the artist with the most number one songs on the Billboard Latin Tropical Airplay chart with 32 songs.

== Early life ==
Marco Antonio Muñiz was born in the New York City borough of Manhattan, the son of Puerto Rican parents. His father, Felipe Muñiz, was a hospital cafeteria worker and musician, and his mother, Guillermina Quiñones, was a housewife.

Anthony's parents named him after Mexican singer Marco Antonio Muñiz. Anthony grew up in East Harlem, also known as Spanish Harlem or El Barrio, and is the youngest of eight children. He was raised Catholic.

His musical education began at home, where he learned to sing in both Spanish and English under the guidance of his father, Felipe, himself a professional guitarist. As a child, Anthony listened to a variety of musical genres and performers, including rock, rhythm and blues, pop stars José Feliciano (Puerto Rico), Air Supply (Australia), as well as salsa legends Héctor Lavoe (Puerto Rico), Willie Colón (United States), and Rubén Blades (Panama), among others. According to Anthony, renowned Puerto Rican percussionist and bandleader Tito Puente in particular wielded a profound personal and professional influence throughout his life.

== Singing career ==
Anthony began his career as a session vocalist for freestyle music and underground New York house music acts. After changing his name to avoid confusion with his namesake, Anthony worked as a songwriter and backing vocalist for pop acts Menudo and the Latin Rascals. Unlike the more socially conscious New York salsa musicians of the 1960s and 1970s, or the highly produced "romantic" salsa artists of the 1980s, Anthony gained fame performing a salsa style that borrowed more heavily from the African American and urban genres that he listened to growing up, such as rhythm and blues and house.

His first album was a freestyle music record, "Rebel", which debuted in 1988 on Bluedog Records. That same year he wrote and produced "Boy I've Been Told" for fellow freestyle artist Sa-Fire. Then in 1989, he sang backup vocals for Ann-Marie on the freestyle club hit, "With or Without You" produced by Little Louie Vega and Todd Terry. A year later in 1990, with Little Louie Vega and Todd Terry, Marc wrote a duet with Chrissy I-eece, called "You Should Know By Now". In 1992, still working with Todd Terry, he provided vocals for "Love Change", which is on the flip-side of a 13" vinyl released by Elan and The Powermachine titled "Here's Your Hat", production of Todd Terry. At the same time, he collaborated with music producer Little Louie Vega, who featured the singer on many freestyle club hits "Ride on the Rhythm" and the "When The Night Is Over" album, which featured the freestyle classic "Time." In 1992, Vega and Anthony opened for Latin bandleader Tito Puente at New York's Madison Square Garden. After 1992, he changed his style from freestyle to salsa and other Latin styles.

=== RMM Records ===
Anthony was initially reluctant to become a salsa musician; he declined an offer to make an album in this genre when Ralph Mercado, president of RMM Records, asked him. Anthony was in a taxi when he heard Juan Gabriel's hit song, "Hasta Que Te Conocí", which influenced him to change his mind and ask Mercado if he could record it as a salsa tune. Inspired by the music of Tito Puente, Héctor Lavoe, Rubén Blades, and Juan Gabriel, Anthony released his Spanish-language debut, Otra Nota, in 1993. The album also included a cover of Bread's "Make It with You". Subsequent tours throughout the Americas, including an opening slot for Blades, established Anthony as one of the newest stars in salsa.

By the early 1990s, Anthony had sold more salsa records than any other performer, solidifying his position among the most important new salsa artists to emerge in the 1990s.

In 1994, he was featured on La India's album Dicen Que Soy, on the song "Vivir Lo Nuestro".

His 1995 follow-up, Todo a su tiempo, won Anthony a Billboard Award for Hot Tropical Artist of the Year. The album was also nominated for a Grammy with songs like "Te Conozco Bien", "Hasta Ayer", "Nadie Como Ella", "Se Me Sigue Olvidando", "Te Amare", and "Llegaste A Mi". The album has sold more than 800,000 copies and has become established as a gold record in both the United States and in Puerto Rico.

Anthony's next Spanish language album, Contra La Corriente, was followed by the television special Marc Anthony: The Concert from Madison Square Garden, broadcast on HBO on Valentine's Day in 2000. The special was nominated for the Music Special of the Year by TV Guide. The album's song "Y Hubo Alguien" became Anthony's first number-one single on the Billboard Hot Latin Tracks and the first by a salsa musician.

Otra Nota, Todo a Su Tiempo, and Contra La Corriente established him as the top-selling singer in the history of the genre, able to sell out Madison Square Garden and prestigious venues internationally.

=== Sony Records ===
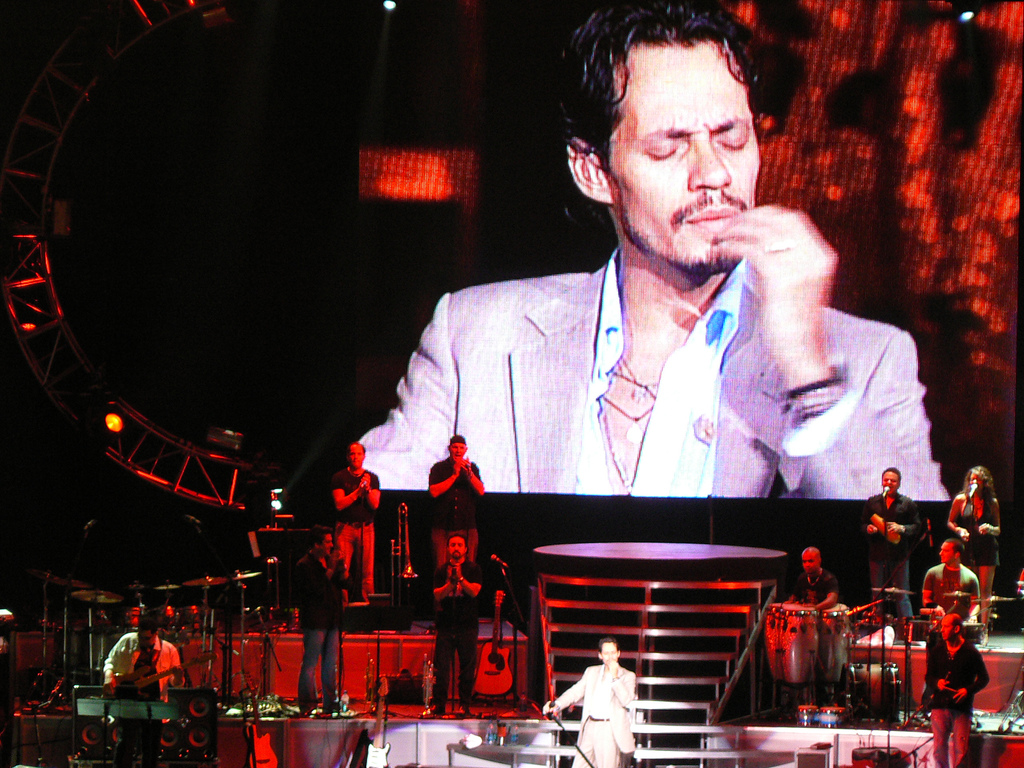
Marc Anthony in 2006

Anthony subsequently recorded the duet "No Me Ames" with Jennifer Lopez on her album On the 6, giving her an assist in her Spanish language crossover attempt. He also recorded a duet "I Want to Spend My Lifetime Loving You" with Tina Arena, written by James Horner for the latter's soundtrack for the 1998 swashbuckling movie The Mask of Zorro.

In 1999, riding the crossover wave of Ricky Martin and Enrique Iglesias in the Anglophone market, Anthony, working with producers Walter Afanasieff, Cory Rooney, Dan Shea, and Rodney Jerkins, released an English-language, self-titled album with the US Top 5 single "I Need to Know", and the Spanish version, "Dímelo". His song "You Sang To Me" was featured in Runaway Bride. A dance version was remixed by Dutch producer Rene Van Verseveld. The album debuted at number eight on the Billboard album chart, and six weeks later went platinum; it eventually was certified triple platinum. The song "I Need To Know" earned a Grammy nomination for Best Male Pop Vocal Performance.

"Tu Amor Me Hace Bien" (2005)
Sample of the song "Tu Amor Me Hace Bien" from the album Valió la Pena. The song was produced by longtime collaborator Sergio George, who worked on most of Anthony's salsa albums.

In 2001, he debuted another salsa album, Libre, which was certified gold with songs like "Celos", "Este Loco Que Te Mira", and "Viviendo". The album spent 14 weeks at the number-one spot on the Billboard Top Latin Albums chart. The year after that, he made another English-language album, Mended.

In June 2004, Anthony released a Latin pop album, Amar Sin Mentiras. The following month, he reintroduced its songs with a danceable salsa rhythm in another album, Valio La Pena. The song "Escapémonos" was a duet with Jennifer Lopez. In the 2005 Latin Grammy Awards, his Amar Sin Mentiras won best Latin Pop Album of The Year, and his Valió La Pena won Best Tropical Album of the Year. Lopez and Anthony performed "Escapémonos" at the 2005 Grammy Awards.

On July 11, 2006, Anthony released Sigo Siendo Yo, a Spanish greatest-hits album. In May 2010 he released Iconos, a tribute to old Latin songs by artists such as José Luis Perales, Juan Gabriel and José José. In 2012, he released a new song called "Cautivo De Este Amor". In the same year, Anthony was inducted into the Billboard Latin Music Hall of Fame.

In December 2012, it was announced that Anthony was recording a salsa album alongside longtime producer Sergio George. Vivir Mi Vida, a Spanish adaptation of Khaled's song "C'est la vie", was released as the lead single on April 25, 2013. In July 2013, Anthony released 3.0, a salsa album including his song "Vivir Mi Vida". Since the release, the album has been certified Platinum. In addition to the new album, Anthony announced his Vivir Mi Vida World Tour and traveled across 15 countries on three continents. After the tour, Anthony announced a second world tour for his album 3.0, his Cambio de Piel Tour.

After his Cambio de Piel Tour, Marc Anthony kicked off UNIDO2, his international tour with Carlos Vives. Marc Anthony is in constant demand for touring. After The Vivir Mi Vida world tour, one of PollStar's top selling tours of 2013, was extended to May 2014 by popular demand, and received a Premio Juventud for Super Tour of the Year. Gigant3S, his US and Latin American tour with Marco Antonio Solis and Chayanne, topped 2012's Billboard Hot Latin Tours charts.

Anthony sang "God Bless America" at the 2013 Major League Baseball All-Star Game at Citi Field.

In September 2016, part of his tour "Marc Anthony Live" included 5 dates at Radio City Music Hall. Of the five shows, three were sold out.

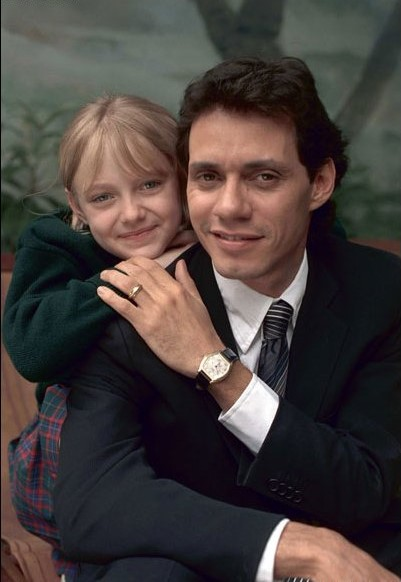
Marc Anthony and Dakota Fanning, on the set of Man on Fire in April 2003

== Acting career ==
Anthony played supporting roles in projects including 1993s Carlito's Way, 1995's Hackers, and 1996's Big Night and The Substitute. He appeared with Rubén Blades and Puerto Rican pop singer Ednita Nazario in Paul Simon's 1998 stage musical, The Capeman, which ran for 68 performances. He had a role in Martin Scorsese's 1999 drama Bringing Out the Dead, and in 2001, opposite Salma Hayek, was in the film In the Time of the Butterflies. In Man on Fire (2004), Anthony, opposite Denzel Washington, played a wealthy businessman who hires a former U.S. Special Forces Soldier to protect his daughter from kidnappers in Mexico City. In 2007, Anthony starred in El Cantante, a biographical drama about the life of salsa music legend Héctor Lavoe, who died in 1993 from AIDS complications. Anthony's then-wife, Jennifer Lopez, narrated the story and portrayed Lavoe's wife. The film, released in August 2007, received mostly negative reviews. In 2010, Anthony guest-starred in two episodes of the TNT medical drama HawthoRNe as a detective and the title character's (Jada Pinkett Smith) love interest. He was later named the executive music producer of the show. Anthony worked with ex-wife Lopez and director-choreographer Jamie King in late 2011 on a Latin talent series created by Simon Fuller, called Q'Viva! The Chosen. It follows Lopez and Anthony as they travel across 21 countries to find new talent. In 2012, Anthony guest-mentored on Season 2 of The X Factor. Anthony played the father of Sonny in movie musical In the Heights.

== Awards and honors ==
Anthony has sold over 12 million albums worldwide, receiving numerous gold and platinum certifications from the Recording Industry Association of America (RIAA) along the way. He has been recognized by New York magazine as one of the Ten Most Influential New Yorkers, was inaugurated into the Billboard Hall of Fame in 2012, and was given a Lifetime Achievement Award by the Congressional Hispanic Caucus Institute in Washington, D.C., in September 2009. He has won a total of 29 Premio Lo Nuestro Latin Music awards, the most for any male artist, and has been honored with the ASCAP Founders Award. He has received twelve Billboard Latin Music Awards, three Billboard Awards, and a special recognition from the Univisión television network in the last two years.

Anthony received his first Grammy in 1998 for Best Latin Tropical Performance for "Contra La Corriente", directed, arranged and produced by Ángel "Cucco" Peña, followed by the first-ever Latin Grammy Song of the Year award for "Dímelo" ("I Need to Know") in 2000. With momentum from that hit single, Marc Anthony, his eponymous English-language album debut, went triple-platinum in the US, and helped usher in the Latin pop explosion of 1999–2000. In 2005 he received double best-album Grammys: Best Latin Pop Album for Amar Sin Mentiras, and Best Salsa Album for Valió la Pena.

Anthony has had 25 Billboard chart hits – most recently, "Vivir Mi Vida" and "Flor Pálida", which have received more than over 680 million views and 270 million YouTube views respectively. In May 2015 he received his second Vevo PL certification for 100 million views of his video A Quien Quiero Mentirle. In 2013, "Vivir Mi Vida", the first single from 3.0, spent 18 consecutive weeks at No. 1 on Billboard, making it the longest-running No. 1 single of all time. It received the Latin Grammy Award for Record of the Year. Anthony was honored as the Person of the Year by the Latin Recording Academy on November 16, 2016, for his musical contributions and philanthropic work.

In 2023, Rolling Stone ranked Anthony at number 167 on its list of the 200 Greatest Singers of All Time.

== Other ventures ==
=== Philanthropy ===
Anthony and entrepreneur Henry Cárdenas launched the Maestro Cares Foundation in January 2012. In 2014, the foundation opened an orphanage in La Romana, Dominican Republic. In 2015, the foundation opened a youth home and school in Barranquilla, Colombia.

In 2017, Anthony teamed-up with his ex-wife Jennifer Lopez and Alex Rodriguez to host One Voice: Somos Live!, a telethon supporting efforts to aid Puerto Rico's recovery in the aftermath of Hurricane Maria.

=== Entrepreneurship ===
Anthony became a minority owner of the Miami Dolphins in 2009. In 2011, he returned to television on the TNT series Hawthorne, toured the U.S., and launched his line of clothes and luxury accessories for Kohl's. Together with Jamie King and Jennifer Lopez, he produced the 2012 TV series ¡Q' Viva! The Chosen, which aired simultaneously on Spanish and English television in the US and Latin America. In April 2015, Anthony announced the formation of the entertainment company Magnus Media. More recently, his production company signed a first-look deal with ViacomCBS International Studios.

== Personal life ==
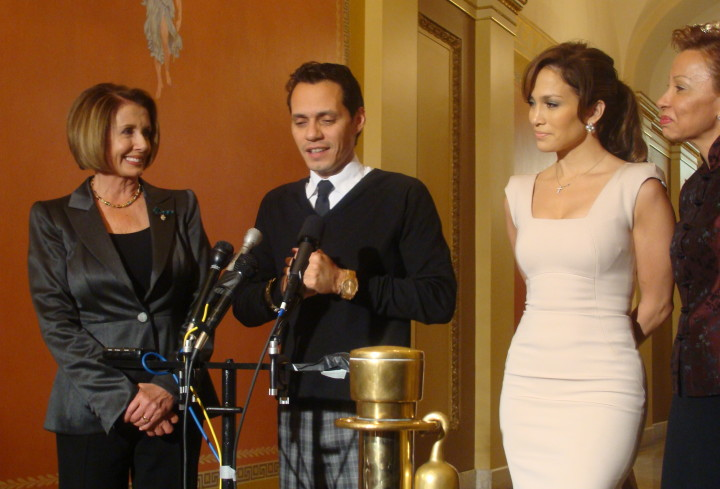
Jennifer Lopez and Marc Anthony, with Nancy Pelosi and Nydia Velázquez

Anthony is a supporter of the Democratic Party, and performed "The Star-Spangled Banner" at the 2012 Democratic National Convention. In 2016, he co-hosted a concert in support of Hillary Clinton's presidential campaign.

Anthony is a practicing Catholic.

Anthony performed "The Star-Spangled Banner" at the 2013 Major League Baseball All-Star Game. While Anthony is an American of Puerto Rican descent, a controversy sprang up on social media due to some viewers' mistaken impression that he is Mexican. In an interview, Anthony responded, "Let's get this straight. I was born and raised in New York. You can't get more New York than me." Anthony was born in New York City from parents who moved from Puerto Rico, his dad was from the city of Yauco.

=== Relationships and family ===
On June 29, 1994, Anthony had a daughter named Arianna Muñiz, whom he shares with then-girlfriend Debbie Rosado. While dating, they adopted their son, Chase Muñiz who was born in 1995.

From 1996 to 1998, Anthony dated and became engaged to Dominican-American actress Claudette Lali.

Anthony married former Miss Universe Dayanara Torres on May 9, 2000, in Las Vegas. The couple had a son, Cristian Marcus Muñiz, on February 5, 2001. In May 2023, Cristian graduated from Parsons School of Design. The couple's second son, Ryan Adrian Muñiz was born on August 16, 2003.

Anthony married Jennifer Lopez in June 2004; they had previously worked together and dated for a few months in the late 1990s. During their marriage, they collaborated on music and performed together, as well as co-starring in El Cantante (2006). Lopez gave birth to their twins on February 22, 2008. People paid $6 million for the first photos of the twins. In 2009, Anthony and Lopez purchased a stake in the Miami Dolphins. They joined several personalities in buying small stakes in the club, including Gloria and Emilio Estefan, Venus and Serena Williams, and Fergie. They bought two houses in Brookville, New York but Anthony and Lopez announced their separation in July 2011, with Anthony filing for divorce on April 9, 2012. Their divorce was finalized on June 16, 2014, with Lopez retaining primary physical custody of the two children.

Anthony and model Shannon De Lima married on November 11, 2014 in La Romana, Dominican Republic. In November 2016, they separated, and the following month announced that they planned to divorce. On February 13, 2017, Anthony and De Lima finalized their divorce.

As of February 2022, Anthony was in a relationship with Miss Universe Paraguay Nadia Ferreira. They got engaged on May 13, 2022 and on January 28, 2023, they were married at the Pérez Art Museum in Miami; David Beckham was one of two best men, along with Carlos Slim. On February 14, 2023, Valentine's Day, the couple announced on Instagram that they were expecting a child, the seventh for Anthony and the first for Ferreira. On June 12, 2023, Anthony and his wife welcomed a son, Marco Muñiz. On January 28, 2026, the third anniversary of their wedding, his wife Nadia announced that they were expecting their second child together, the eighth child for the singer. On July 21, 2026, Anthony and his wife welcomed their daughter named Myla Anthony.

== Discography ==
- When the Night Is Over (with Little Louie Vega) (1991)
- Otra Nota (1993)
- Todo a Su Tiempo (1995)
- Contra la Corriente (1997)
- Marc Anthony (1999)
- Libre (2001)
- Mended (2002)
- Amar Sin Mentiras (2004)
- Valió la Pena (2004)
- El Cantante (2007)
- Iconos (2010)
- 3.0 (2013)
- Opus (2019)
- Pa'llá Voy (2022)
- Muevense (2024)

== Tours ==
Juntos en concierto (Together in Concert) series:

- Juntos en concierto 2005 with Chayanne and Alejandro Fernández
- Juntos en concierto 2006 with Laura Pausini and Marco Antonio Solís
- Juntos en concierto 2007 with Jennifer Lopez

== Filmography ==
=== Film ===
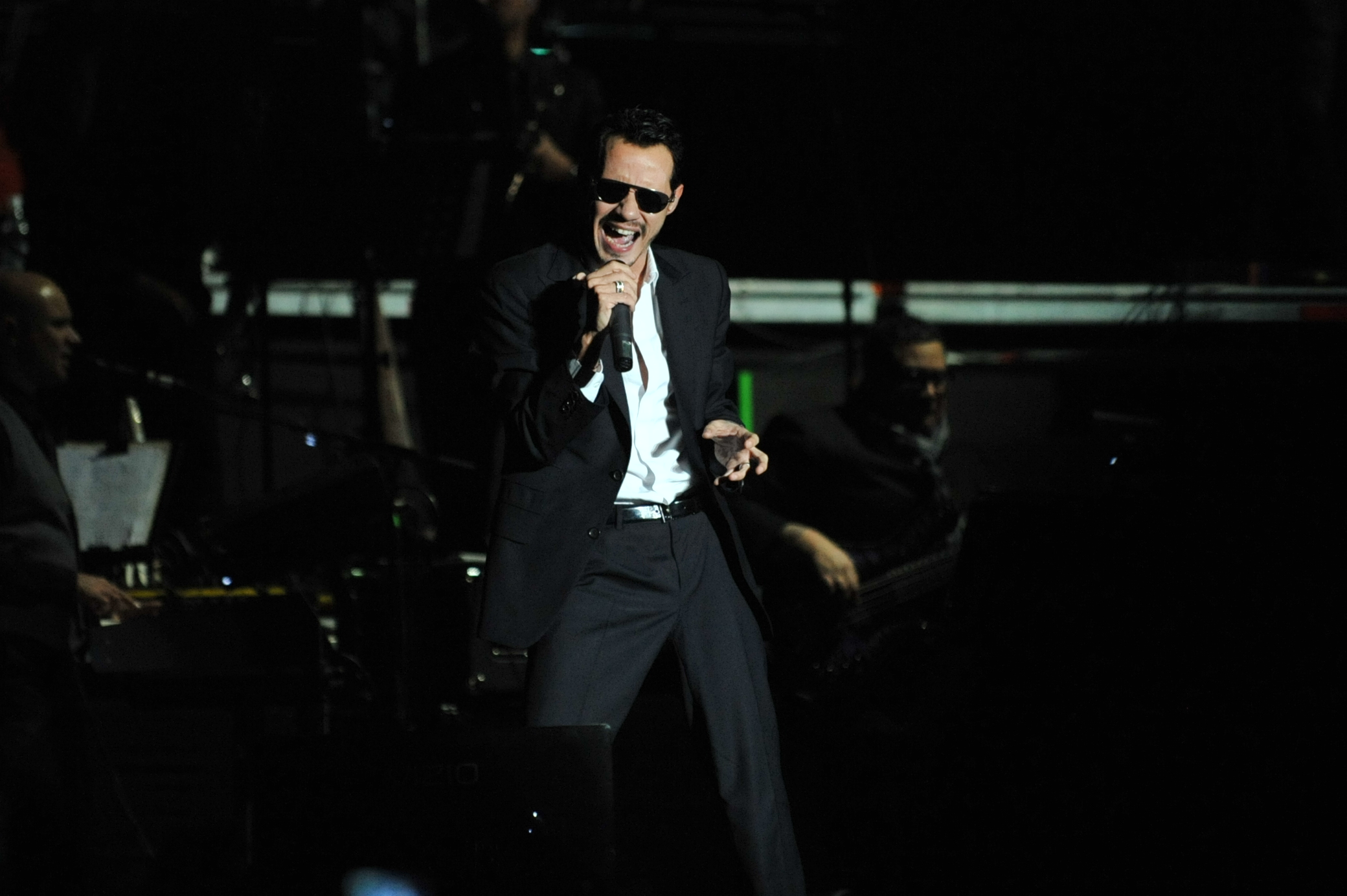
Anthony in 2011

Year	Title	Role	Notes
1990	East Side Story	Flaco	
1993	Carlito's Way	Latin Band at Disco	Sings "Parece Mentira"
1994	Natural Causes	Marine Guard	
1995	Hackers	Agent Ray	
1996	Big Night	Cristiano	
1996	The Substitute	Juan Lacas	
1999	Bringing Out the Dead	Noel	
2004	Man on Fire	Samuel Ramos	
2006	El Cantante	Héctor Lavoe	
2021	In the Heights	Mr. De La Vega	

=== Television ===
Year	Title	Role	Notes
1997	Mad TV	Football player #30	Episode #2.11
2000	Happily Ever After: Fairy Tales for Every Child	Mario (voice)	Episode: "Robinita Hood"
2001	In the Time of the Butterflies	Lio	TV movie
2010–2011	HawthoRNe	Nick Renata	12 episodes
2012	The X Factor	Himself	Guest judge; Episode #2.9

=== Stage ===
Year	Play	Role	Notes
1998	The Capeman	Young Salvador Agron	Broadway

== See also ==
- List of artists who reached number one on the US Dance chart
- List of awards and nominations received by Marc Anthony
- List of best-selling Latin music artists
- List of Puerto Ricans
- List of Number 1 Dance Hits (United States)
- Nuyorican
- Puerto Ricans in New York City
- Puerto Ricans in the United States
