= Abrázame Muy Fuerte (song) =

2000 single by Juan Gabriel

Single by Juan Gabriel

from the album El Alma Musical de Juan Gabriel: Sus Éxitos y Sus Intérpretes
- Released: June 2000
- Length: 4:01
- Label: BMG US Latin
- Songwriter: Juan Gabriel
- Producer: Bebu Silvetti

Juan Gabriel singles chronology
"Todo Está Bien" (1999)	"Abrázame Muy Fuerte" (2000)	"Del Altar Hasta la Tumba" (2000)

"Abrázame Muy Fuerte" (transl. "Hold Me Tightly") is a song written and performed by Mexican singer-songwriter Juan Gabriel. The song was produced by Bebu Silvetti and was composed for the Mexican telenovela of the same name (2000). It was released as the lead single in June 2000 for the compilation album El Alma Musical de Juan Gabriel: Sus Éxitos y Sus Intérpretes (2000) and later included on his 25th studio also titled Abrázame Muy Fuerte (2000). A romantic ballad with Latin and pop sounds and backed by an orchestra, it is a confession of love. Gabriel was inspired to write the song due to his sister's coma.

"Abrázame Muy Fuerte" has been ranked among Gabriel's best songs by several music critics. The track received several accolades including Hot Latin Song of the Year at the 2002 Billboard Latin Music Awards. Commercially, the track became Gabriel's seventh number-one single in the Billboard Hot Latin Songs chart and was the best-performing Latin single of 2001. In 2015 Gabriel re-recorded the song with Italian singer Laura Pausini on his 28th studio album Los Dúo. It has been covered by several artists including Marc Anthony, and Isabel Pantoja. Anthony's version peaked at numbers 21 and four on the Billboard Hot Latin Songs and Latin Pop Airplay charts, respectively.

== Background and composition ==
"Abrázame Muy Fuerte"
A 24 second sample of "Abrázame Muy Fuerte". Backed by an orchestra, music critics noted the use of the piano and violins.

Since the 1970s, Juan Gabriel, one of the best-selling Latin music artists, has sold over 40 million copies and with more than 300 artists who have recorded one or more of his 900 compositions in a career spanning over 25 years. In 1999, he released the studio album Todo Está Bien, which was met with mixed reviews. On 29 March 2000, El Siglo de Torreon reported that a telenovela, then titled Pecado mortal, was being released later in the year and that Gabriel would compose its main theme song. This was corroborated by Billboard editor John Lannert on 6 May, stated that Gabriel was set to release the song Mexican radio stations titled "Abrázame" in the upcoming weeks. The telenovela's name was changed to Abrázame muy fuerte on the insistence of the singer that it match the name of the song. The telenovela, which stars Victoria Ruffo, Aracely Arámbula, Fernando Colunga and Pablo Montero, began broadcast in Mexico on 31 July 2000. It became very successful and won five TVyNovelas Awards in 2001, including Best Telenovela, Best Actor and Best Supporting Actor.

"Abrázame Muy Fuerte" is a romantic ballad with a Latin and pop sound. It was produced by Argentine musician Bebu Silvetti. The song is backed by a full orchestra, beginning softly with a piano and violins. The melody builds as the song progresses to a "powerful orchestral event" until it reaches to a "climatic crescendo". Lyrically, it is an "emotional confession of love". In the song, he chants: "Embrace me, for time passes and never forgives" and "[h]ug me, because time is evil and a cruel friend". Gabriel was inspired to compose the track after his sister Virginia Aguilera Valadez, who took care of him after their mother died, fell into a coma for seven years.

== Promotion and covers ==
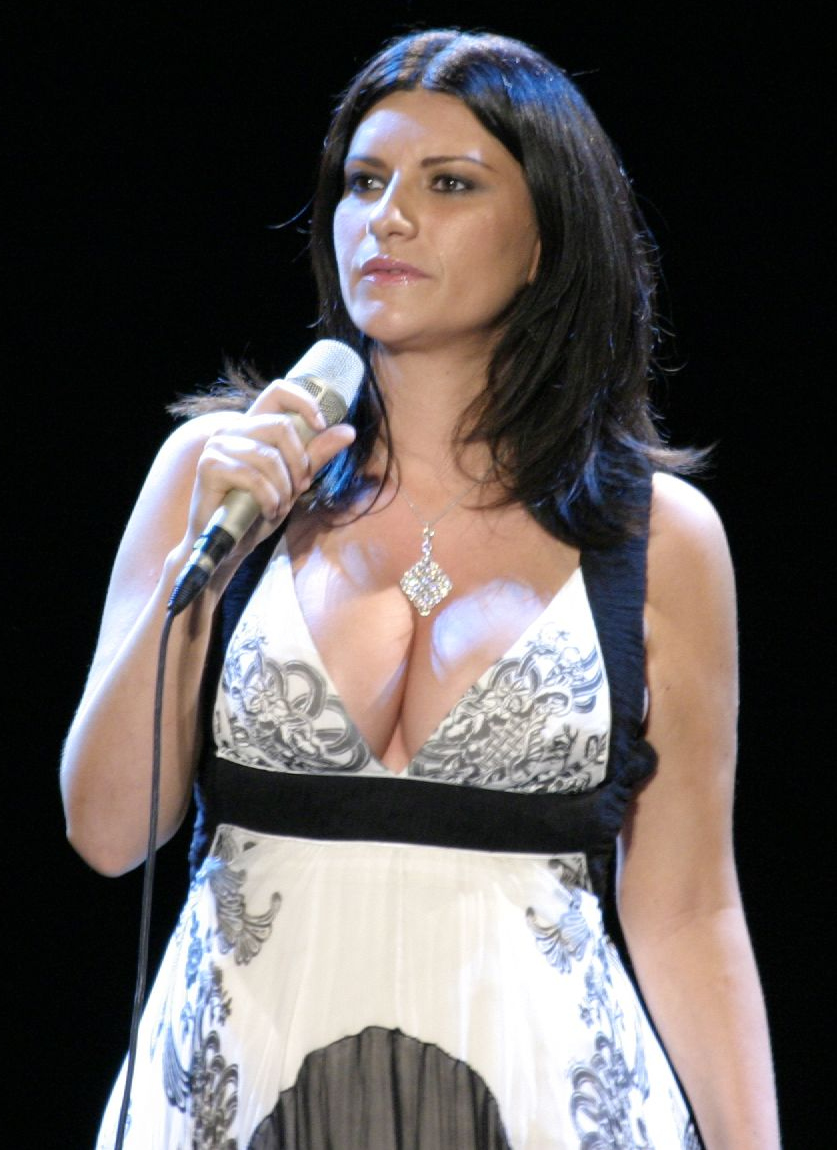
Juan Gabriel re-recorded "Abrázame Muy Fuerte" with Laura Pausini (pictured) in 2015.

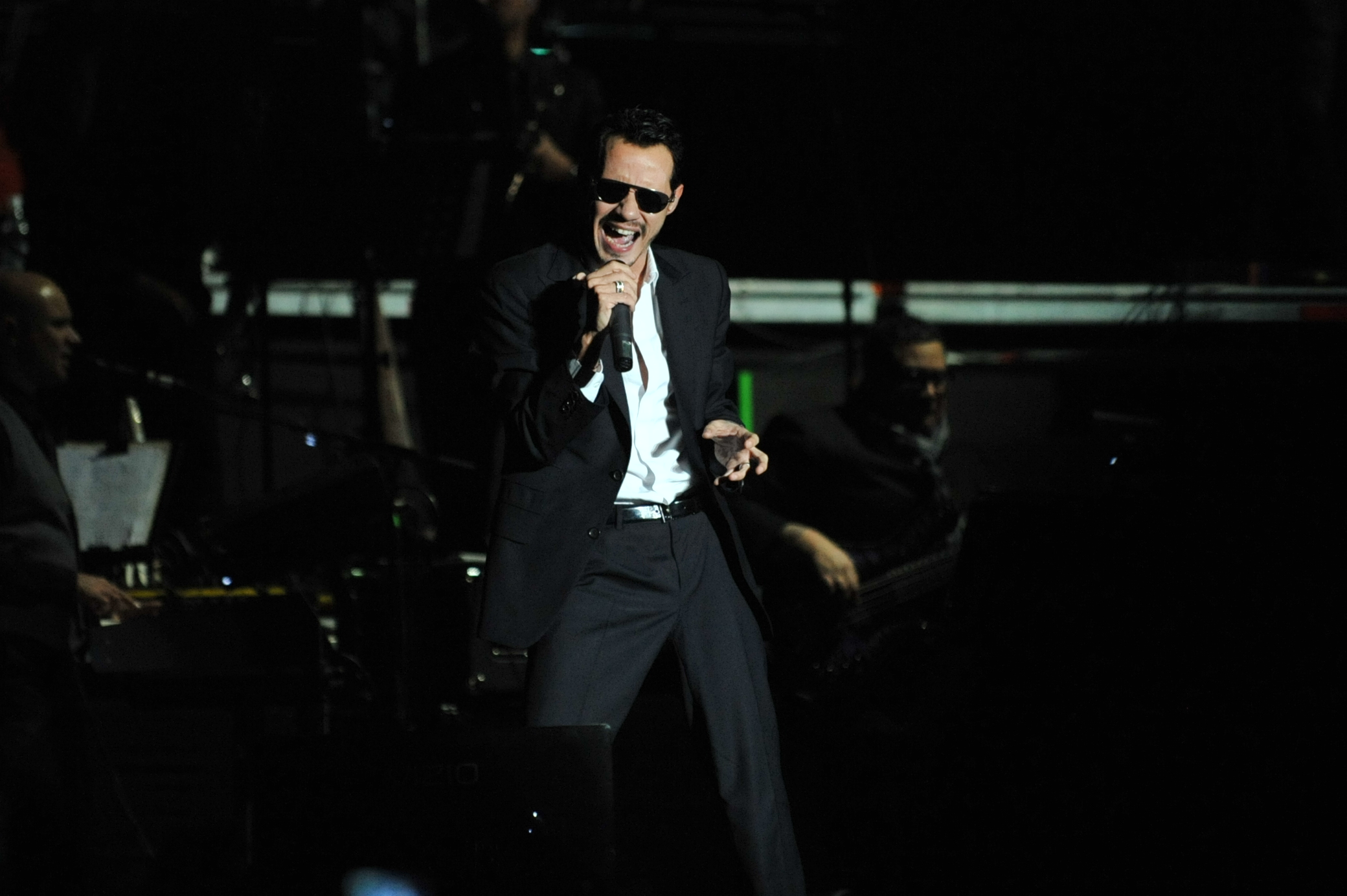
Marc Anthony covered "Abrázame Muy Fuerte" on his studio album Iconos (2010) and was released as its second single.

"Abrázame Muy Fuerte" was released as the lead single for Gabriel's compilation album, El Alma Musical de Juan Gabriel: Sus Éxitos y Sus Intérpretes (2000), on late June 2000 to radio stations. The compilation album commemorates the artist's 50 years of living. It was later included on his 25th studio album of the same name as the song released later in the year. In addition, it is featured on the telenovela's soundtrack released a year later. A dance remix was included on his greatest hits album Mis Favoritas (2010). In 2013, Gabriel performed the song live at the Palacio de Bellas Artes in Mexico City where he was celebrating his 40th anniversary of his music career. Juan Gabriel's presentation was later released as a live album titled Mis 40 en Bellas Artes (2014). Gabriel re-recorded "Abrázame Muy Fuerte" as a duet with Italian singer Laura Pausini on his 28th studio album Los Dúo (2015). A music video for the duet was included on the DVD deluxe edition of Los Dúo, Vol. 2 (2015).

The song has been covered by several artists including Marc Anthony and Isabel Pantoja. Anthony released it on 2 August 2010 as the second single from his tenth studio album Iconos (2010). Anthony listened to six hundred records to select songs for the album. Anthony covered three of Gabriel's songs "Abrázame Muy Fuerte", "Ya lo Sé Que Tu Te Vas", and "Te Lo Pido por Favor" since the songs were "related to his taste in music and who he was." Anthony's version peaked at numbers 21 and four on the Billboard Hot Latin Songs and Latin Pop Airplay charts. Pantoja's rendition was produced by Gabriel before she was sentenced to prison in 2014 and released after Gabriel's death in 2016.

== Reception ==
Writing a positive review of the album, Sandra Barrera of the Los Angeles Daily News called the title track a "must listen". "Abrázame Muy Fuerte" has been listed among Gabriel's best songs, placing number eight and seven on Classic Rock History and Singers Room's lists, respectively. Billboard ranked the track number four on the 50 Best Latin Pop Songs From 2000 to 2023 and number 90 on The 100 Greatest Songs of 2001. In 2016, BBC Mundo listed the track as one of the 11 Songs That Led Juan Gabriel to Become a Success in Latin America. Two years later, CNN en Español included "Abrázame Muy Fuerte" on their 10 Most Memorable Songs list by Juan Gabriel. On the duet, AllMusic's Thom Jurek felt, with its "shimmering synths, grand piano, and strings", that it was a "fantastic match that juxtaposes" both Gabriel and Pausini.

For the song, Gabriel won two Billboard Latin Music Awards in 2002 for Hot Latin Track of the Year and Latin Pop Airplay Track of the Year; he also received the Songwriter of the Year award. "Abrázame Muy Fuerte" was also awarded Pop Song of the Year at the 2002 Lo Nuestro Awards. In addition, it awarded Song of the Year at the 2001 El Premio de la Gente. It was recognized as "Super Song of the Year" at the ASCAP Latin Awards under the pop/ballad category in 2002. It was nominated Best Theme Song at the TVyNovelas Awards in 2001, but ultimately lost to "Enloqueceme" by OV7.

Commercially, the song debuted in the Hot Latin Songs chart at number 38 in the week of 2 December 2000, climbing to the top ten three weeks later, peaking at number-one on 27 January 2001, holding this position for four weeks, being replaced by MDO's "Te Quisé Olvidar". "Abrázame Muy Fuerte" returned to the top of the chart the following week. The track was succeeded at number-one by "Sólo Quiero Amarte" performed by Puerto Rican singer Ricky Martin five weeks later. The song spent nine non-consecutive weeks at the top spot of the chart, and ended the year as the best performing Latin single of 2001. It also topped the Latin Pop Airplay subchart and ranked number one on its year-end chart.

== Charts ==
=== Weekly charts ===
Chart performance for "Abrázame Muy Fuerte"
Chart (2001)	Peak position
US Bubbling Under Hot 100 (Billboard)	9
US Hot Latin Songs (Billboard)	1
US Latin Pop Airplay (Billboard)	1
US Regional Mexican Airplay (Billboard)	2
US Tropical Airplay (Billboard)	6

=== Year-end charts ===
2001 year-end chart performance for "Abrázame Muy Fuerte"
Chart (2001)	Position
US Hot Latin Songs (Billboard)	1
US Latin Pop Airplay (Billboard)	1
US Regional Mexican Airplay (Billboard)	24
US Tropical Airplay (Billboard)	31

=== Decade-end charts ===
2000s decade-end chart performance for "Abrázame Muy Fuerte"
Chart (2000–2009)	Position
US Hot Latin Songs (Billboard)	10
US Latin Pop Airplay (Billboard)	10

=== All-time charts ===
All-time chart performance for "Abrázame Muy Fuerte"
Chart (2021)	Position
US Hot Latin Songs (Billboard)	11

== Certifications ==
Certifications for "Abrázame Muy Fuerte"
Region	Certification	Certified units/sales
Mexico (AMPROFON)	2× Diamond+2× Platinum+Gold	750,000^{‡}
United States (RIAA)	Gold	500,000^{‡}
^{‡} Sales+streaming figures based on certification alone.

== See also ==
- List of number-one Billboard Hot Latin Tracks of 2001
- List of Billboard Latin Pop Airplay number ones of 2001
