= Hasta Que Te Conocí =

Single by Juan Gabriel

Single by Juan Gabriel

from the album Pensamientos
- Released: 1986
- Recorded: 1986
- Genre: Latin pop
- Length: 7:30
- Label: RCA
- Songwriter: Juan Gabriel
- Producer: Juan Gabriel

Juan Gabriel singles chronology
"Que Lastima" (1986)	"Hasta Que Te Conocí" (1986)	"Debo Hacerlo" (1987)

Audio sample
- A 30 second sample of "Hasta Que Te Conocí", where the singer describes living a happy life until he meets a lover, where he learns the meaning of suffering.: file; help

"Hasta Que Te Conocí" ("Until I Met You") is a song by Mexican singer-songwriter Juan Gabriel. It was released in 1986 as the third single from his studio album Pensamientos. Written and produced by Gabriel, the song's lyrics focus on a protagonist learning the meaning of suffering after meeting a lover who mistreats him. It peaked at number two on the Billboard Hot Latin Song chart. A live version of the song was included on his album En el Palacio de Bellas Artes (1990) which peaked at number ten on the Hot Latin Songs chart.

The song has been recorded by several artists including Roberto del Castillo, Ana Gabriel, Marc Anthony, Raúl di Blasio, and Maná. Anthony covered the song on his debut studio album Otra Nota (1993) after hearing it on the radio during a taxi ride. di Blasio's version features Gabriel performing the vocals on the song. Maná's recording peaked at number one on the Hot Latin Songs and earned a nomination for Record of the Year at the 2012 Latin Grammy Awards. Gabriel received an American Society of Composers, Authors and Publishers (ASCAP) Latin award in 1994 and in 2013 for Anthony's and Maná's covers of the song.

== Background ==
"Hasta Que Te Conocí" is a song written, produced, and performed by Mexican singer-songwriter Juan Gabriel as the final track on Juan Gabriel's studio album Pensamientos (1986). It was released as the second single from the album by RCA Latin. The song is in the key of D minor. In the lyrics, the protagonist has not known the feeling of suffering until he meets a lover who mistreats him. The song has been featured in some of Gabriel's compilation albums including 14 Exitos Originales: Para Ti (1988), La Historia del Divo (2006), and Lo Esencial de Juan Gabriel (2008). A live version of the song was included on the live album En el Palacio de Bellas Artes (1990) as a potpourri which features the National Symphony Orchestra. He also performed the song live during the 10th Latin Grammy Awards ceremony where he received the Latin Recording Academy Person of the Year award. In 2015, Gabriel recorded the song as a duet featuring Mexican singer Joy Huerta (of Jesse & Joy) for his album Los Dúo.

== Reception ==
Jason Birchmeier of Allmusic called the song a "classic" on the review of La Historia del Divo. On the week of December 26, 1986, "Hasta Que Te Conocí" debuted at number thirty-nine on the Billboard Hot Latin Songs chart. The song climbed to the top ten on the week of March 21, 1987 and peaked at number two six weeks later with the number one position being held off by Braulio's song "En Bancarrota". "Hasta Que Te Conocí" ended 1987 as the fourth best-performing Latin single of the year in the United States. The live potpourri version of the song peaked at number ten on the Hot Latin Songs chart. That version, and its musical bridge in particular, later saw a resurgence in social media usage during the 2026 FIFA World Cup by fans of the Mexico national football team. In early-July 2026, the song saw a 258% increase in streams from Mexico on Spotify, while a 211% increase in streams came from users in the United States.

== Charts ==
=== Weekly charts ===
Weekly chart performance for "Hasta Que Te Conocí"
Chart (1987)	Peak position
US Hot Latin Songs (Billboard)	2

Chart performance for the potpourri version
Chart (1991)	Peak position
US Hot Latin Songs (Billboard)	10

=== Year-end charts ===
Year-end chart performance for "Hasta Que Te Conocí"
Chart (1987)	Position
US Latin Songs (Billboard)	4

=== All-time charts ===
All-time chart performance for "Hasta Que Te Conocí"
Chart (2016)	Position
US Hot Latin Songs (Billboard)	44

== Marc Anthony version ==
"Hasta Que Te Conocí"

Single by Marc Anthony

from the album Otra Nota
- Released: 1993
- Genre: Salsa
- Length: 5:07
- Label: RMM
- Songwriter: Juan Gabriel
- Producer: Sergio George

Marc Anthony singles chronology
"Ride on the Rhythm" (1991)	"Hasta Que Te Conocí" (1993)	"Palabras del Alma" (1993)

In 1993, American recording artist Marc Anthony covered "Hasta Que Te Conocí" on his debut studio album Otra Nota. According to Anthony, he originally had no desire to record in Spanish and turned down an offer by RMM manager Ralph Mercado to record an album in salsa. During a taxi ride, Anthony heard Gabriel's "Hasta Que Te Conocí" on the radio and was compelled to perform the song in salsa. But in a version of this story that appeared in a 2016 article in Billboard, Anthony explains that Little Louis Vega's sister first played the song for him. This led to an agreement between Mercado and Anthony to record an album in salsa with a cover of "Hasta Que Te Conocí" included. After recording this cover, Anthony said, "I never recorded freestyle again."

A curtailed version of the song appears on Anthony's compilation album Desde un Principio: From the Beginning (1999) while the full version appears on his 2003 compilation album Éxitos Eternos. Anthony performed a live version of the song at the 1994 Lo Nuestro Awards. The song has been included in his tour setlist including his Nada Personal Tour and the Jennifer Lopez and Marc Anthony en Concierto tour.

=== Reception ===
On the review of the album, Evan Gutierrez of Allmusic cited Anthony's cover as one of the tracks that "showcased well" with his "edgy improvisation and wide vocal range". Anthony's cover received a nomination for Tropical Song of the Year at the 1994 Lo Nuestro Awards, but lost to "El Baile del Perrito" by Wilfrido Vargas y su Orquesta. At the American Society of Composers, Authors and Publishers (ASCAP) Latin Awards of 1994, Juan Gabriel received an award in the Tropical/Salsa Category for "Hasta Que Te Conocí". "Hasta Que Te Conocí" peaked at number thirteen on the Billboard Hot Latin Songs chart.

=== Music video ===
A music video for the song was produced to promote the single which was filmed in New York City. In the video, Anthony and a woman are shown having a happy relationship until she breaks up with him by leaving a note for him leaving Anthony in bitterness. It was included on the video compilation album Mejores Videos de India y Marc Anthony (1996). The video for Anthony's cove was nominated New Artist Latin Clip of the Year at the 1993 Billboard Music Video Awards, but ultimately lost to "Sentir" by Jon Secada.

=== Charts ===
Chart (1993)	Peak position
US Hot Latin Songs (Billboard)	13

== Maná version ==
"Hasta Que Te Conocí"

Single by Maná

from the album Exiliados en la Bahía: Lo Mejor de Maná
- Released: June 25, 2012
- Recorded: 2012
- Genre: Latin rock, Bolero, Cha Cha
- Length: 4:56
- Label: Warner Music Latina
- Songwriter: Juan Gabriel
- Producer: Fher Olvera

Maná singles chronology
"Mi Reina del Dolor" (2012)	"Hasta Que Te Conocí" (2012)	"Penélope" (2012)

In 2012, Mexican rock band Maná covered the song for their greatest hits album Exiliados en la Bahía: Lo Mejor de Maná. The song was released as a single on June 25, 2012. It is the second time that the band covered a song by Juan Gabriel after "Se Me Olvidó Otra Vez" in 1999. According to lead vocalist Fher Olvera, they heard the song while in Venezuela and the band decided to cover the song in ballad with swing music.

=== Reception ===
David Jeffires of Allmusic called Mana's cover of the song "an excellent, heartfelt take". Carlos Quintana of About.com labeled it as "one of the very best songs of this production." At the 13th Latin Grammy Awards, the song received a nomination for Record of the Year which was awarded to Jesse & Joy for "¡Corre!". In 2013, it was nominated Rock/Alternative Song of the Year at the 25th Lo Nuestro Awards, which went to Maná's other song "El Verdadero Amor Perdona". The success of Maná's cover led to Gabriel receiving an ASCAP Latin award in the pop category.

In the United States, the song reached number-one on the Billboard Hot Latin Songs becoming their ninth number-one song on the chart. It also peaked at number one on the Billboard Latin Pop Songs chart. In Mexico, the peaked at number three on the Mexican Airplay Chart.

=== Music video ===
A music video for Maná's version was released on August 27, 2012. It was directed by Pablo Croce and filmed in the Estudios Churubusco in Mexico City, Mexico. In the video, a man recounts his sorrows with depression and alcohol in a bar regretting his love for a woman.

=== Charts ===
Chart (2012)	Peak position
Mexican Airplay Chart (Billboard International)	3
Spain (Promusicae)	48
US Hot Latin Songs (Billboard)	1
US Latin Pop Airplay (Billboard)	1

== Other cover versions ==
In 1987, Dominican musician Roberto del Castillo covered "Hasta Que Te Conocí" in merengue on his album Justo a Tiempo. His version peaked at number eleven on the Hot Latin Songs chart. Mexican singer Ana Gabriel performed a live cover of the song on her album En Vivo (1990). Her version peaked at number twenty-five on the Hot Latin Songs chart. In 1994, Argentine pianist Raúl di Blasio covered the song on his album Piano de America, Vol. 2. di Blasio's cover was released to radio stations on May 10, 1994. It features Gabriel performing the vocals which was omitted on the Anglo version of the song. di Blasio's version peaked at number thirty-six on the Hot Latin Songs. It has been featured on his compilation albums Entre Amigos y Exitos (2003) and La Historia del Piano de América... Los Éxitos (2006) and on Gabriel's album Mis Canciones, Mis Amigos (2009). A music video for the Anglo version was released by BMG and was included on the DVD set for La Historia del Piano de América... Los Éxitos (2006). Mexican singer Pilar Montenegro included a version of the track featuring rapper Julio Voltio on her album South Beach in 2005. In 2009, Mexican recording artist Anahí sampled the record on her song "Hasta Que Me Conociste" ("Until You Met Me") from her album Mi Delirio, in which the song is written as a "response" to the original composition. In 1988, Orquesta La Inmensidad covered a salsa version of the song in their album El Retrato under Fania label.

== See also ==
- Billboard Top Latin Songs Year-End Chart
- List of Billboard Hot Latin Songs and Latin Airplay number ones of 2012
- List of number-one Billboard Hot Latin Pop Airplay of 2012
