= Winslow (surname) =

Winslow is an English surname. Notable people with the surname include:

- Adam Winslow (born 1979 or 1980), British businessman
- Anna Green Winslow (1759–1780), colonial American diarist, daughter of Joshua Winslow
- Bradley Winslow (1831–1914), American Civil War Union brevet brigadier general
- Brett Winslow (born 1967), American volleyball player
- Cameron Winslow (1854–1932), US Navy admiral
- Carl Henry Winslow (1931–2020), American fire chief
- Carleton Winslow (1876–1946), American architect
- Celeste M. A. Winslow (1837–1908), American author
- Charles Winslow (1888–1963), South African tennis player
- Charles-Edward Amory Winslow (1877–1957), American bacteriologist and public health expert
- Charles F. Winslow (1811–1877), American physician, botanist and diplomat
- Daniel Winslow (born 1958), American lawyer and politician
- Don Winslow (born 1953), American author
- Donald James Winslow (1911–2010), American English professor
- Edward Winslow (1595–1655), English-American pilgrim leader on the Mayflower and governor of Plymouth Colony
- Edward Winslow (loyalist) (1746/47-1815), American loyalist officer, judge and official
- Edward Winslow (silversmith) (1669-1753), early American silversmith
- Edward Francis Winslow (1837–1914), American Civil War Union brevet brigadier general and railroad executive
- Forbes Benignus Winslow (1810–1874), psychiatrist
- Francis A. Winslow (1866–1932), American judge
- George Winslow (1946–2015), American child actor
- George Winslow (American football) (born 1963), American National Football League former punter
- Harriet Winslow (1796–1833), American missionary
- Helen M. Winslow (1851–1938), American author, journalist
- Herbert Winslow (1848–1914), US Navy rear admiral
- Jacob B. Winslow (1669–1769), Danish-born French anatomist
- Jack Copley Winslow (1882–1974), English missionary
- James Winslow (born 1983), British racing driver
- John Winslow (disambiguation), several people
- Joshua Winslow (1726–1801), Canadian soldier, judge and politician
- Josiah Winslow (c.1628-1680), colonial American Governor of Plymouth Colony
- Justise Winslow (born 1996), American basketball player
- Kellen Winslow (born 1957), American football player
- Kellen Winslow II (born 1983), American football player and son of Kellen Winslow
- Kenelm Winslow (1599-1672), English Pilgrim who immigrated to the Plymouth Colony in 1629
- L. Forbes Winslow (1844–1913), British psychiatrist
- Margaret E. Winslow (1836–1936), American activist, editor, author
- Michael Winslow (born 1958), American actor and comedian known as the "Man of 10,000 Sound Effects"
- Norris Winslow (1834–1900), New York banker and politician
- Ola Elizabeth Winslow (1885–1977), American author and historian
- Pat Winslow (born 1943), American retired heptathlete and track and field coach
- Paul Winslow (American football) (1938–2012), former defensive back in the National Football League
- Paul Winslow (cricketer) (1929–2011), South African cricketer
- Perry Winslow (1815–1890), American whaling ship master
- Rickie Winslow (born 1964), American basketball player
- Robert Winslow (1916–1994), American football player and coach
- Robert E. Winslow (general) (1829–1893), American Civil War Union brevet brigadier general
- Rosemary Winslow, American poet, and academic
- Ryan Winslow (born 1994), American football player
- Samuel Winslow (1862–1940), American politician
- Thomasina Winslow (1965-2023), American musician
- Tom Winslow (1940–2010), American folk singer and songwriter
- Walter C. Winslow (1882–1962), American judge
- Warren Winslow (1810–1862), Governor of North Carolina

== Fictional characters ==
- Cassie Layne Winslow and Richard Winslow, on the American soap opera Guiding Light
- Barton Winslow, in the American television series Shining Time Station
- The Winslow family, in the American television sitcom Family Matters
- Thomas Howard, alias Ephraim Winslow, in the 2019 film The Lighthouse, played by Robert Pattinson

== See also ==
- Admiral Winslow (disambiguation)
- General Winslow (disambiguation)
- Justice Winslow (disambiguation)
- Senator Winslow (disambiguation)
