= Winslow =

Winslow may refer to:

== Places ==
=== United Kingdom ===
- Winslow, Buckinghamshire, England, a market town and civil parish
- Winslow Rural District, Buckinghamshire, a rural district from 1894 to 1974

=== United States and Canada ===
- Rural Municipality of Winslow No. 319, Saskatchewan, Canada
- Winslow, Arizona, a city
- Winslow, Arkansas, a city
- Winslow, Illinois, a village
- Winslow, Indiana, a town
- Winslow, Kentucky, an unincorporated community
- Winslow, Maine, a New England town
- Winslow, Nebraska, a village
- Winslow, Pennsylvania, an unincorporated community
- Winslow, Bainbridge Island, Washington, the downtown area of the city of Bainbridge Island
- Winslow, West Virginia, an unincorporated community
- Winslow Township (disambiguation)

=== Elsewhere ===
- Winslow Reef, Cook Islands
- Winslow Reef, Phoenix Islands, Kiribati
- Winslow, Victoria, Australia
- Winslow (crater), impact crater on Mars
- 8270 Winslow, an asteroid

== People and fictional characters ==
- Winslow (surname)
- Winslow (given name)

== Transport ==
- Winslow station (Arizona), United States
- Winslow railway station, England

== Other uses ==
- Winslow High School (disambiguation)
- USS Winslow, three US Navy ships
- Winslow Air Force Station, a former US Air Force radar station in Arizona
- Winslow Chemical Laboratory, a former laboratory of Rensselaer Polytechnic Institute, Troy, New York, United States
- Winslow Marine Railway and Shipbuilding Company, a shipyard from 1903 to 1959 in the state of Washington, United States
- Winslow (band), an American rock band
- Winslow (bidding system), a contract bridge bidding system

== See also ==
- Winslow House (disambiguation)
- Winslow West, Arizona
