= List of Oregon Ducks men's basketball head coaches =

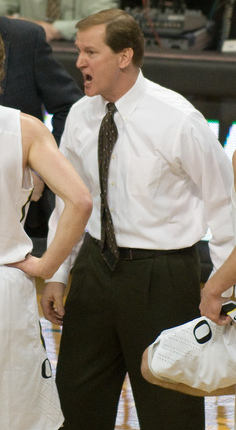
Dana Altman, the current head coach of the Oregon Ducks, and the winningest head coach in Ducks men's basketball history.

The following is a list of Oregon Ducks men's basketball head coaches. There have been 19 head coaches of the Ducks in their 119-season history.

Oregon's current head coach is Dana Altman. He was hired as the Ducks' head coach in April 2010, replacing Ernie Kent, who was fired following the 2009–10 season.

| No. | Tenure | Coach | Years | Record | Pct. |
|---|---|---|---|---|---|
| 1 | 1902–1904 | Charles Burden | 2 | 0–6 | .000 |
| 2 | 1905–1906 | Walter C. Winslow | 1 | 0–5 | .000 |
| 3 | 1906–1907; 1913–1917 (Note: Oregon did not field a team for the 1915–16 season.) | Hugo Bezdek | 4 | 17–35 | .327 |
| 4 | 1907–1908 | Charles Murphy | 1 | 8–9 | .471 |
| 5 | 1909–1913; 1917–1918 | Bill Hayward | 5 | 34–29 | .540 |
| 6 | 1918–1919 | Dean Walker | 1 | 13–4 | .765 |
| 7 | 1919–1920 | Charles A. Huntington | 1 | 8–9 | .471 |
| 8 | 1920–1923 | George Bohler | 3 | 37–39 | .487 |
| 9 | 1923–1935 | Bill Reinhart | 12 | 180–101 | .641 |
| 10 | 1935–1944; 1945–1947 | Howard Hobson | 11 | 212–124 | .631 |
| 11 | 1944–1945; 1947–1951 | John A. Warren | 5 | 87–76 | .534 |
| 12 | 1951–1956 | Bill Borcher | 5 | 69–68 | .504 |
| 13 | 1956–1971 | Steve Belko | 15 | 179–211 | .459 |
| 14 | 1971–1978 | Dick Harter | 7 | 112–82 | .577 |
| 15 | 1978–1983 | Jim Haney | 5 | 53–82 | .393 |
| 16 | 1983–1992 | Don Monson | 9 | 116–145 | .444 |
| 17 | 1992–1997 | Jerry Green | 5 | 72–70 | .507 |
| 18 | 1997–2010 | Ernie Kent | 13 | 235–173 | .576 |
| 19 | 2010–2026 | Dana Altman | 16 | 382–182 | .677 |
| Totals | | 19 coaches | 121 seasons | 1,815–1,449 | .556 |
Records updated through end of 2025–26 season Source
