= List of Oregon Ducks men's basketball seasons =

This is a list of the seasons completed by the Oregon Ducks men's basketball.

== Season-by-season results ==
Statistics overview
Season	Coach	Overall	Conference	Standing	Postseason
Charles Burden (Independent) (1902–1904)
1902–03	Charles Burden	0–2			
1903–04	Charles Burden	0–4			
Walter Winslow (Independent) (1905–1906)
1905–06	Walter Winslow	0–5			
Hugo Bezdek (Independent) (1906–1907)
1906–07	Hugo Bezdek	4–3			
Bill Hayward (Independent) (1909–1913)
1909–10	Bill Hayward	1–5			
1910–11	Bill Hayward	9–4			
1911–12	Bill Hayward	12–2			
1912–13	Bill Hayward	9–10			
Hugo Bezdek (Independent) (1913–1915)
1913–14	Hugo Bezdek	6–11			
1914–15	Hugo Bezdek	7–10			
Hugo Bezdek (Pacific Coast Conference) (1916–1917)
1916–17	Hugo Bezdek	0–11	0–8	6th	
Bill Hayward (Independent) (1917–1918)
1917–18	Bill Hayward	3–8			
Dean Walker (Pacific Coast Conference) (1918–1919)
1918–19	Dean Walker	13–4	11–3	1st	
Shy Huntington (Pacific Coast Conference) (1919–1920)
1919–20	Shy Huntington	8–9	5–8	6th	
George Bohler (Pacific Coast Conference) (1920–1923)
1920–21	George Bohler	15–5	8–4	4th	
1921–22	George Bohler	7–24	0–16	8th	
1922–23	George Bohler	15–10	2–6	5th (North)	
Bill Reinhart (Pacific Coast Conference) (1923–1935)
1923–24	Bill Reinhart	15–5	4–4	3rd (North)	
1924–25	Bill Reinhart	15–5	7–2	T–1st (North)	
1925–26	Bill Reinhart	18–4	10–0	1st (North)	
1926–27	Bill Reinhart	24–4	8–2	1st (North)	
1927–28	Bill Reinhart	18–3	8–2	2nd (North)	
1928–29	Bill Reinhart	10–8	3–7	5th (North)	
1929–30	Bill Reinhart	14–12	8–8	3rd (North)	
1930–31	Bill Reinhart	12–10	6–10	4th (North)	
1931–32	Bill Reinhart	13–11	7–9	4th (North)	
1932–33	Bill Reinhart	8–19	2–14	5th (North)	
1933–34	Bill Reinhart	17–8	9–7	2nd (North)	
1934–35	Bill Reinhart	16–12	7–9	3rd (North)	
Howard Hobson (Pacific Coast Conference) (1935–1944)
1935–36	Howard Hobson	20–11	7–9	4th (North)	
1936–37	Howard Hobson	20–9	11–5	T–2nd (North)	
1937–38	Howard Hobson	25–8	14–6	1st (North)	
1938–39	Howard Hobson	29–5	14–2	1st (North)	NCAA Champion
1939–40	Howard Hobson	19–12	10–6	T–2nd (North)	
1940–41	Howard Hobson	18–18	7–9	T–3rd (North)	
1941–42	Howard Hobson	12–15	7–9	T–4th (North)	
1942–43	Howard Hobson	19–10	10–6	2nd (North)	
1943–44	Howard Hobson	16–10	11–5	2nd (North)	
John Warren (Pacific Coast Conference) (1944–1945)
1944–45	John Warren	30–15	11–5	T–1st (North)	NCAA Elite Eight
Howard Hobson (Pacific Coast Conference) (1945–1947)
1945–46	Howard Hobson	16–17	8–8	3rd (North)	
1946–47	Howard Hobson	18–9	7–9	4th (North)	
John Warren (Pacific Coast Conference) (1947–1951)
1947–48	John Warren	18–11	8–8	4th (North)	
1948–49	John Warren	12–18	7–9	T–3rd (North)	
1949–50	John Warren	9–19	6–10	5th (North)	
1950–51	John Warren	18–13	10–6	2nd (North)	
Bill Borcher (Pacific Coast Conference) (1951–1956)
1951–52	Bill Borcher	14–16	8–8	T–3rd (North)	
1952–53	Bill Borcher	14–14	8–8	T–2nd (North)	
1953–54	Bill Borcher	17–10	9–7	T–2nd (North)	
1954–55	Bill Borcher	13–13	8–8	2nd (North)	
1955–56	Bill Borcher	11–15	5–11	T–6th	
Steve Belko (Pacific Coast Conference) (1956–1959)
1956–57	Steve Belko	4–21	2–14	9th	
1957–58	Steve Belko	13–11	6–10	7th	
1958–59	Steve Belko	9–16	3–13		
Steve Belko (Independent) (1959–1964)
1959–60	Steve Belko	19–10			NCAA Elite Eight
1960–61	Steve Belko	15–12			NCAA first round
1962–63	Steve Belko	11–15			
1963–64	Steve Belko	14–12			
Steve Belko (AAWU/Pac–8 Conference) (1964–1971)
1964–65	Steve Belko	9–17	3–11	8th	
1965–66	Steve Belko	13–13	6–8	T–4th	
1966–67	Steve Belko	9–17	1–13	8th	
1967–68	Steve Belko	7–19	2–12	8th	
1968–69	Steve Belko	13–13	5–9	T–5th	
1969–70	Steve Belko	17–9	8–6	4th	
1970–71	Steve Belko	17–9	8–6	T–3rd	
Dick Harter (Pac–8 Conference) (1971–1978)
1971–72	Dick Harter	6–20	0–14	8th	
1972–73	Dick Harter	16–10	8–6	3rd	
1973–74	Dick Harter	15–11	9–5	3rd	
1974–75	Dick Harter	21–9	6–8	T–5th	NIT Third Place
1975–76	Dick Harter	19–11	10–4	T–2nd	NIT Quarterfinal
1976–77	Dick Harter	19–10	9–5	2nd	NIT Quarterfinal
1977–78	Dick Harter	16–11	6–8	T–5th	
Jim Haney (Pac-10 Conference) (1978–1983)
1978–79	Jim Haney	12–15	7–11	T–6th	
1979–80	Jim Haney	10–17	5–13	T–7th	
1980–81	Jim Haney	13–14	6–12	7th	
1981–82	Jim Haney	9–18	4–14	T–8th	
1982–83	Jim Haney	9–18	5–13	9th	
Don Monson (Pac-10 Conference) (1983–1992)
1983–84	Don Monson	16–13	11–7	3rd	NIT first round
1984–85	Don Monson	15–16	8–10	6th	
1985–86	Don Monson	11–17	6–12	9th	
1986–87	Don Monson	16–14	8–10	7th	
1987–88	Don Monson	16–14	10–8	5th	NIT second round
1988–89	Don Monson	8–21	3–15	9th	NIT first round
1989–90	Don Monson	15–14	10–8	5th	
1990–91	Don Monson	13–15	8–10	T–5th	
1991–92	Don Monson	6–21	2–16	10th	
Jerry Green (Pac-10 Conference) (1992–1997)
1992–93	Jerry Green	10–20	3–15	9th	
1993–94	Jerry Green	10–17	6–12	8th	
1994–95	Jerry Green	19–9	11–7	4th	NCAA first round
1995–96	Jerry Green	16–13	9–9	T–5th	
1996–97	Jerry Green	17–11	8–10	7th	NIT first round
Ernie Kent (Pac-10 Conference) (1997–2010)
1997–98	Ernie Kent	13–14	8–10	T–5th	
1998–99	Ernie Kent	19–13	8–10	T–5th	NIT Semifinals
1999–00	Ernie Kent	22–8	13–5	3rd	NCAA first round
2000–01	Ernie Kent	14–14	5–13	T–6th	
2001–02	Ernie Kent	26–9	14–4	1st	NCAA Elite Eight
2002–03	Ernie Kent	23–10	10–8	5th	NCAA first round
2003–04	Ernie Kent	18–13	9–9	T–4th	NIT Semifinal
2004–05	Ernie Kent	14–13	6–12	T–8th	
2005–06	Ernie Kent	15–18	7–11	T–7th	
2006–07	Ernie Kent	29–8	11–7	T–3rd	NCAA Elite Eight
2007–08	Ernie Kent	18–14	9–9	T–5th	NCAA first round
2008–09	Ernie Kent	8–23	2–16	10th	
2009–10	Ernie Kent	16–16	7–11	T–8th	
Dana Altman (Pac-10 Conference) (2010–2011)
2010–11	Dana Altman	21–18	7–11	T–7th	CBI Champion
Dana Altman (Pac-12 Conference) (2011–2024)
2011–12	Dana Altman	24–10	13–5	T–2nd	NIT Quarterfinals
2012–13	Dana Altman	28–9	12–6	T–2nd	NCAA Sweet Sixteen
2013–14	Dana Altman	24–10	10–8	T–3rd	NCAA Round of 32
2014–15	Dana Altman	26–10	13–5	T–2nd	NCAA Round of 32
2015–16	Dana Altman	31–7	14–4	1st	NCAA Elite Eight
2016–17	Dana Altman	33–6	16–2	T–1st	NCAA Final Four
2017–18	Dana Altman	23–13	10–8	T–6th	NIT second round
2018–19	Dana Altman	25–13	10–8	T–4th	NCAA Sweet Sixteen
2019–20	Dana Altman	24–7	13–5	1st	NCAA – canceled
2020–21	Dana Altman	21–7	14–4	1st	NCAA Sweet Sixteen
2021–22	Dana Altman	20–15	11–9	T–5th	NIT second round
2022–23	Dana Altman	21–15	12–8	4th	NIT Quarterfinals
2023–24	Dana Altman	24–12	12–8	4th	NCAA Round of 32
Dana Altman (Big Ten Conference) (2024–present)
2024–25	Dana Altman	25–10	12–8	T-7th	NCAA Round of 32
2025–26	Dana Altman	12-19	5-15	T-15th	
Total:		1,815–1,449 (.556)			
National champion Postseason invitational champion Conference regular season champion Conference regular season and conference tournament champion Division regular season champion Division regular season and conference tournament champion Conference tournament champion
