= General Winslow =

General Winslow may refer to:

- Bradley Winslow (1831–1914), American Civil War Union brevet brigadier general
- Edward Francis Winslow (1837–1914), American Civil War Union brevet brigadier general and railroad executive
- John Winslow (British Army officer) (1703–1774), major-general of the colonial militia during the French and Indian War
- Robert E. Winslow (general) (1829–1893), American Civil War Union brevet brigadier general
