= Winsloe =

Winsloe is a surname. Notable people with the surname include:

- Alfred Winsloe (1852–1931), Royal Navy officer
- Christa Winsloe (1888–1944), formerly Baroness Christa Hatvany de Hatvan, German-Hungarian novelist, playwright
- Courtney Winsloe (born 1987), New Zealand cricketer

== See also ==
- Winsloe, Prince Edward Island
- Winslow (surname)
