= John Winslow =

John Winslow may refer to:

- John Winslow (1597–1674) early settler of Plymouth Colony
- John Winslow (British Army officer) (1703–1774), major-general of the colonial militia during the French and Indian War
- John F. Winslow (1810–1892), American businessman and iron manufacturer
- John Ancrum Winslow (1811–1873), American rear admiral
- John B. Winslow (1851–1920), American jurist
- John Winslow (politician) (1802–1874), American politician and agriculturist

== See also ==
- Winslow (disambiguation)
