= Winslow Township =

Winslow Township may refer to the following places:

- Winslow Township, Washington County, Arkansas
- Winslow Township, Stephenson County, Illinois
- Winslow Township, Camden County, New Jersey
- Winslow Township, Pennsylvania

== See also ==
- Winslow (disambiguation)
