= Senator Winslow =

Senator Winslow may refer to:

- Bradley Winslow (1831–1914), New York State Senate
- Norris Winslow (1834–1900), New York State Senate
- Warren Winslow (1810–1862), North Carolina State Senate
