= Oregon Jazz Band =

American dixieland jazz band

- Origin: Coos Bay, Oregon, United States
- Genres: Jazz
- Years active: 1947–present

The Oregon Jazz Band is a dixieland jazz band based in Coos Bay, Oregon. They are America's longest established dixieland jazz band, founded by Dr. Bill Borcher in Coos Bay in 1947.

Borcher went on to become the men's basketball coach at the University of Oregon (1951–1956) and founded the Sacramento Jazz Jubilee, the world's largest dixieland jazz festival.

Internationally, several other bands equal or predate the Oregon Jazz Band. They are Graeme Bell, Australia, 1940; Roger Bell, Australia, 1943; Humphrey Lyttelton, England and Dutch Swing College, the Netherlands, 1945; Dave Dallwitz, Australia and Claude Luter, France, 1946; and High Society, France, 1947.

Over the years, the Oregon Jazz Band has typically included eight musicians with Borcher as the original lead trumpet. Additionally, there has been trombone, clarinet, saxophone, piano, bass, banjo and drums. Because of the number of years of its existence, the band personnel has included dozens of musicians, most from the state of Oregon, but a few from Washington or California.
