= Edward Winslow (silversmith) =

American silversmith and military officer

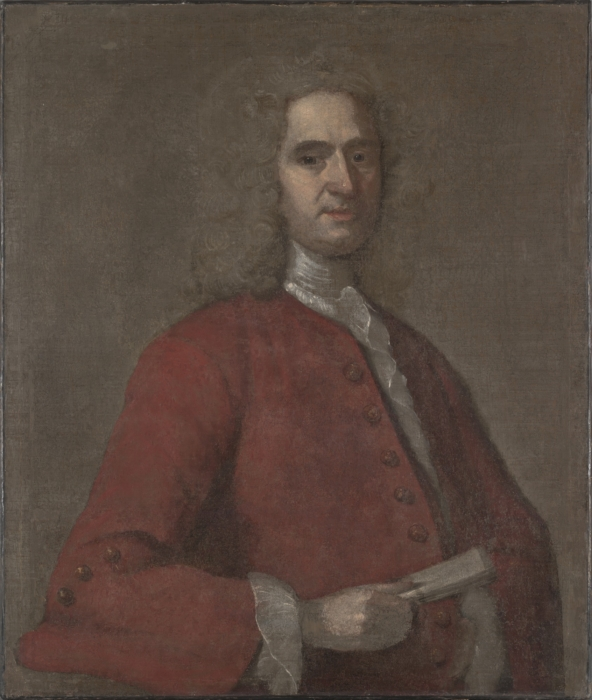
A portrait of Winslow by John Smibert

Colonel Edward Winslow (November 1, 1669 – December 1, 1753) was a silversmith and military officer from the Thirteen Colonies.

== Personal life ==
Winslow was one of ten children, and his father died when he was 13 years old. He was the grandson of John Winslow and Mary Chilton who came to America on the Mayflower. Edward was the grand nephew of Edward Winslow, one of the first governors of Plymouth Colony.

Edward had nine sons and two daughters. His granddaughter, Susanna F. Clarke, married artist John Singleton Copley. Copley painted a portrait of Edward Winslow's son, Isaac and his wife, which is in the Museum of Fine Arts, Boston.

== Career ==
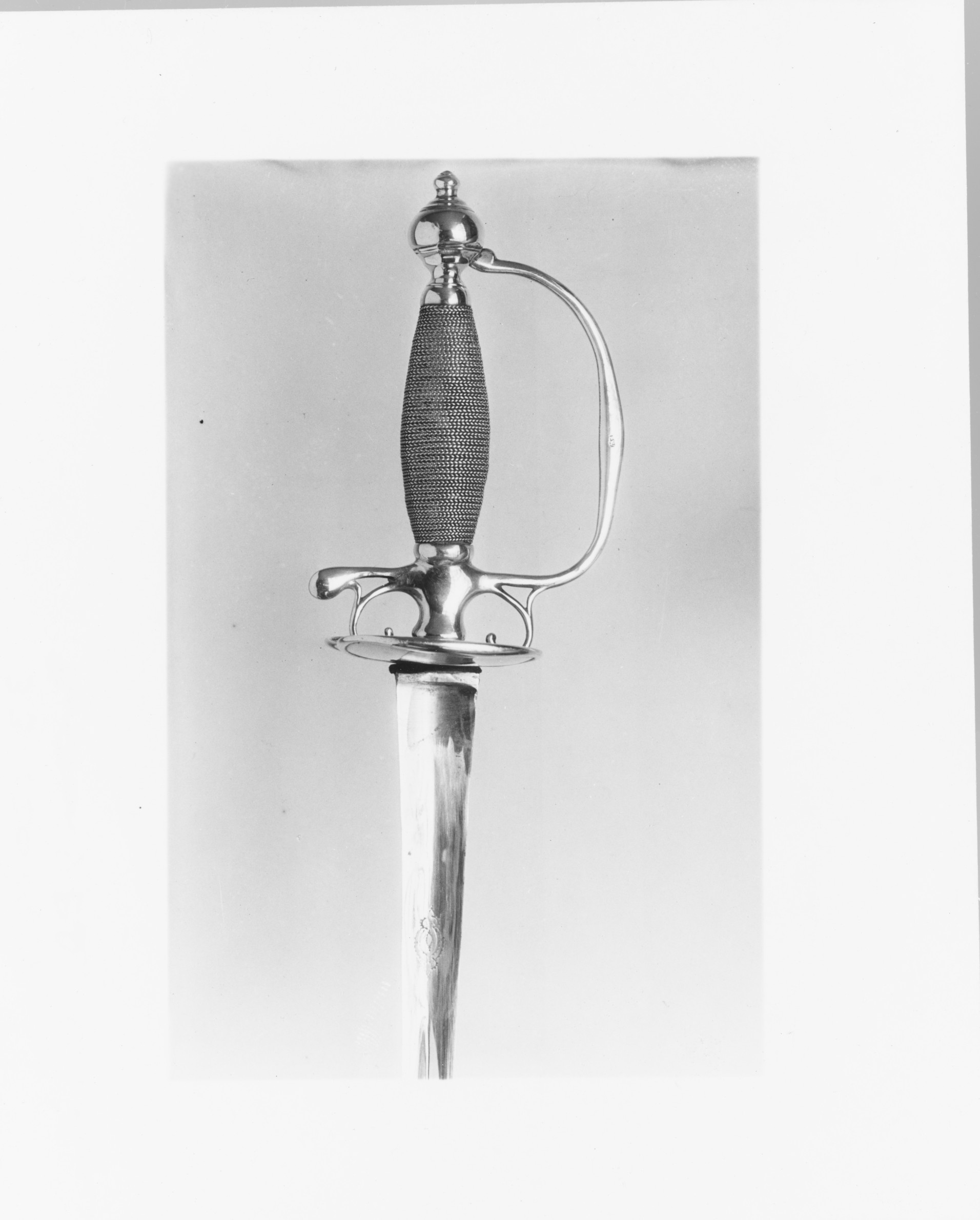
Silver dress sword made by Edward Winslow (Metropolitan Museum of Art collection).

In 1682, he became an apprentice to Jeremiah Dummer, who was one of America's first silversmiths. Winslow excelled and became a sought-after silversmith.

Numerous examples of his work are in the Museum of Fine Arts, Boston, Yale University Art Gallery, Art Institute of Chicago, and the Metropolitan Museum of Art in New York City. Several of his apprentices went on to become prominent silversmiths in their own right.

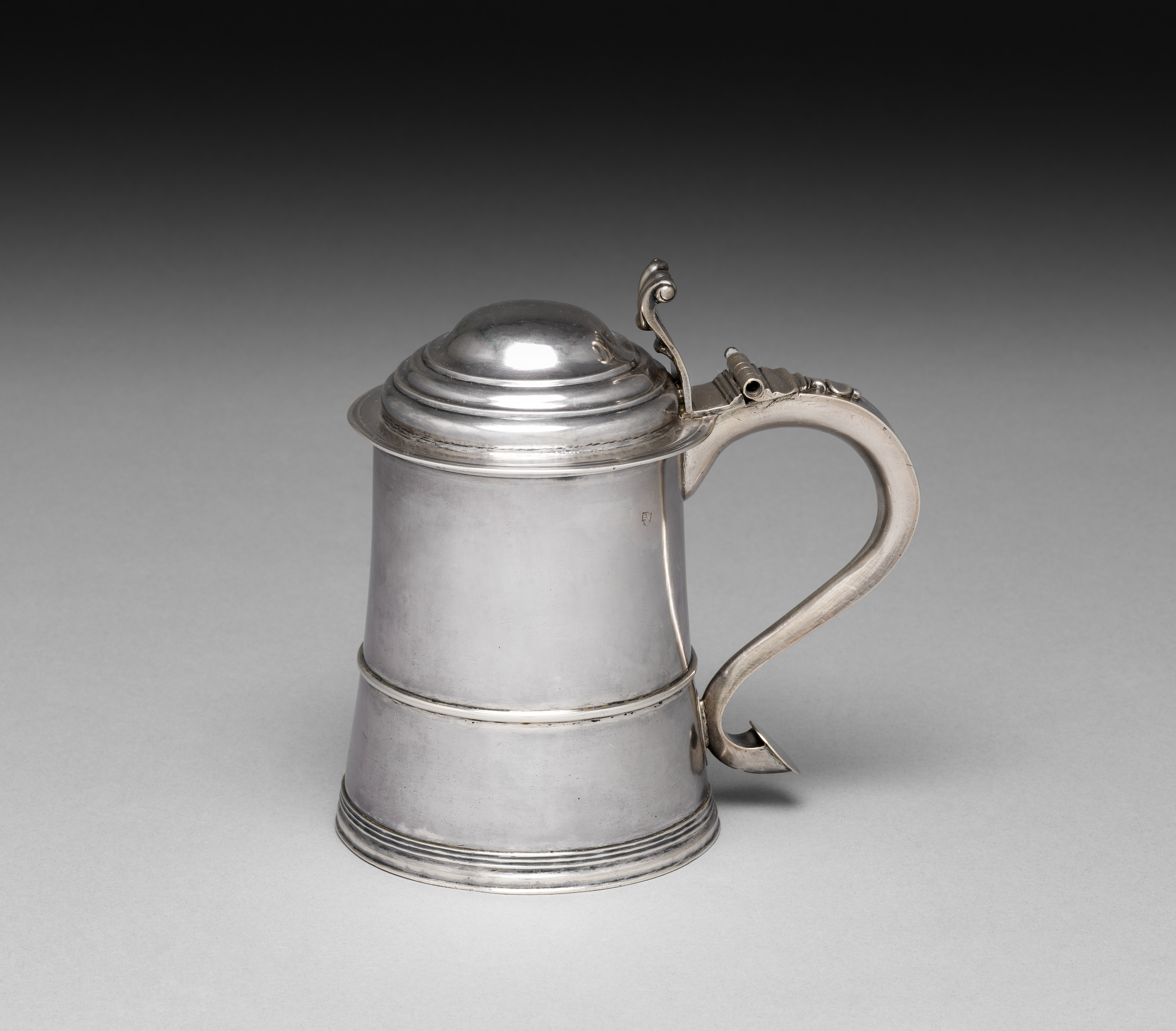
Silver tankard made by Edward Winslow in 1725 (Cleveland Museum of Art collection).

Winslow became a member of the Ancient and Honorable Artillery Company in 1700. He became sergeant in 1702, lieutenant in 1711, captain in 1714, major of the regiment in 1729, and colonel in 1733. He served as high sheriff of Suffolk County 1725–42, and became a justice of the Court of Common Pleas. Winslow's apprentices included Joseph Russell, who in addition to working as a silversmith went on to serve as chief justice of the Rhode Island Supreme Court.
