= Edward Francis Winslow =

Union Army general

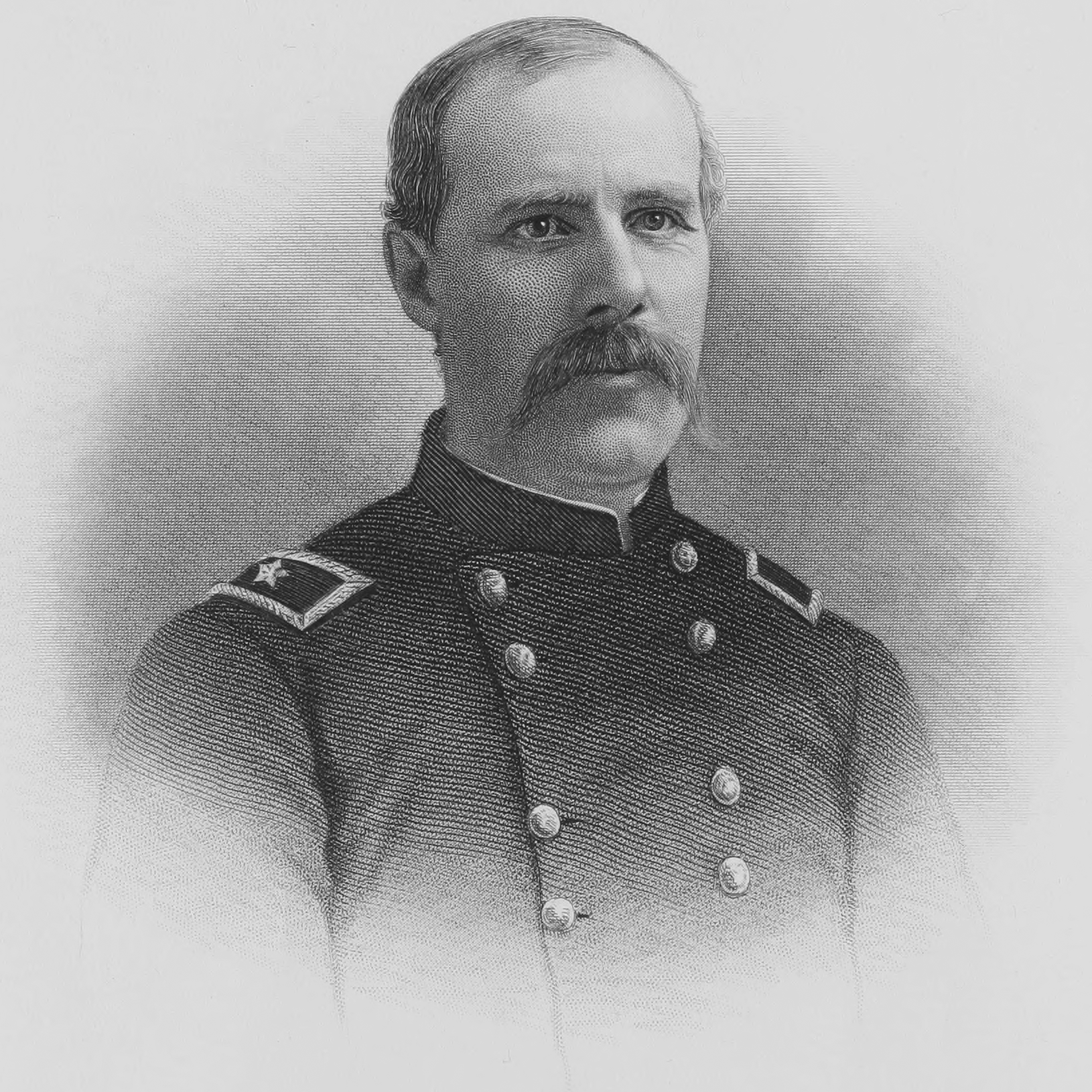
- Winslow, Fourth Iowa Cavalry
- Born: September 28, 1837; Augusta, Maine
- Died: October 22, 1914 (aged 77); Canandaigua, New York
- Burial place: Canandaigua, New York
- Military career
- Allegiance: United States of America; Union
- Branch: Army
- Service years: 1861–1865
- Rank: Colonel; Brevet Brigadier General
- Unit: 4th Iowa Cavalry Regiment
- Conflicts: American Civil War; Siege of Vicksburg; Battle of Brice's Crossroads; Battle of Tupelo; Battle of Westport; Battle of Selma
- Awards: Brevet
- Other work: Railroad executive

Edward Francis Winslow (September 28, 1837 – October 22, 1914) was an American soldier, railroad executive, and merchant who served as colonel and brigadier general of the 4th Iowa Cavalry Regiment during the American Civil War from 1864 to 1865. Winslow participated in numerous Union Army campaigns of the Army of the Tennessee, including the siege of Vicksburg.

== Early life ==
Winslow was born on September 28, 1837, to his parents Stephen Winslow and Elizabeth Bass, in Augusta, Maine. Winslow was a descendant to Kenelm Winslow, an English pilgrim who traveled to Plymouth, Massachusetts, in 1629. Winslow was educated in the common schools of Augusta during his childhood. In the spring of 1856, Winslow traveled to Mount Pleasant, Iowa, where he entered the mercantile business.

== American Civil War ==
In the fall of 1861, the American Civil War began, and Winslow enlisted as captain of Company F of the 4th Iowa Cavalry Regiment on October 14, 1861, being commissioned on October 24. On January 3, 1863, Winslow was promoted to major of the regiment. Winslow participated in the siege of Vicksburg, where he was posted to the rear of the siege lines to protect the army from Joseph E. Johnston's Confederate forces near Jackson, Mississippi. Winslow was promoted colonel of the 4th Iowa on July 4. For the next year, he commanded cavalry brigades in the Army of the Tennessee, being engaged in the battles of Meridian, Brice's Crossroads and Tupelo. In October 1864, he commanded the 4th Brigade in Alfred Pleasonton's cavalry division during Price's Missouri Raid. He was wounded at the Battle of Westport, and command of his brigade passed to Frederick Benteen. A few days later, he returned to the field in command of a brigade in James H. Wilson's cavalry corps and fought at the battles of Selma and Columbus. After Union troops seized Columbus, he was placed in command of the city, where he led the destruction of the ironclad ram CSS Jackson (CSS Muscogee), as well as the arsenal, the armory, and many factories. Winslow received a brevet promotion to brigadier general, dated December 12, 1864. On April 16, 1865, Winslow commanded the 3rd Iowa Cavalry and 4th Iowa Cavalry in an assault during the Battle of Columbus, which is considered by many to be the last battle of the Civil War. General Winslow himself later wrote on January 23, 1914, "I have always considered that engagement, by the number present and the results achieved, to be the final battle of the war". He was discharged from service on August 10, 1865.

== Later years and death ==
After the war, Winslow served as a railway executive. In November, 1879, Winslow took charge of the Manhattan Elevated Railway. After a year he became executive for the St. Louis & Southern Railroad and the Atlantic and Pacific Railroad. During this time Winslow became president of the New York, Ontario and Western Railway, the Manhattan Elevated Railway. Winslow was also appointed inspector for the Government of the Union Pacific Railroad by president Ulysses S. Grant on its completion. Winslow spent his last 20 years in the city of Paris, France. Winslow died of heart failure on October 22, 1914, in Canandaigua, New York, and was interred there on the 25th.

== See also ==
- Bradley Winslow, distant cousin who also served as a colonel in the Civil War and was also brevetted Brigadier General
- Cleveland Winslow, distant cousin who also served as a colonel in the Civil War
