= Dr. John and Viola Phillips House and Office =

Historic house in Washington, United States

- U.S. National Register of Historic Places
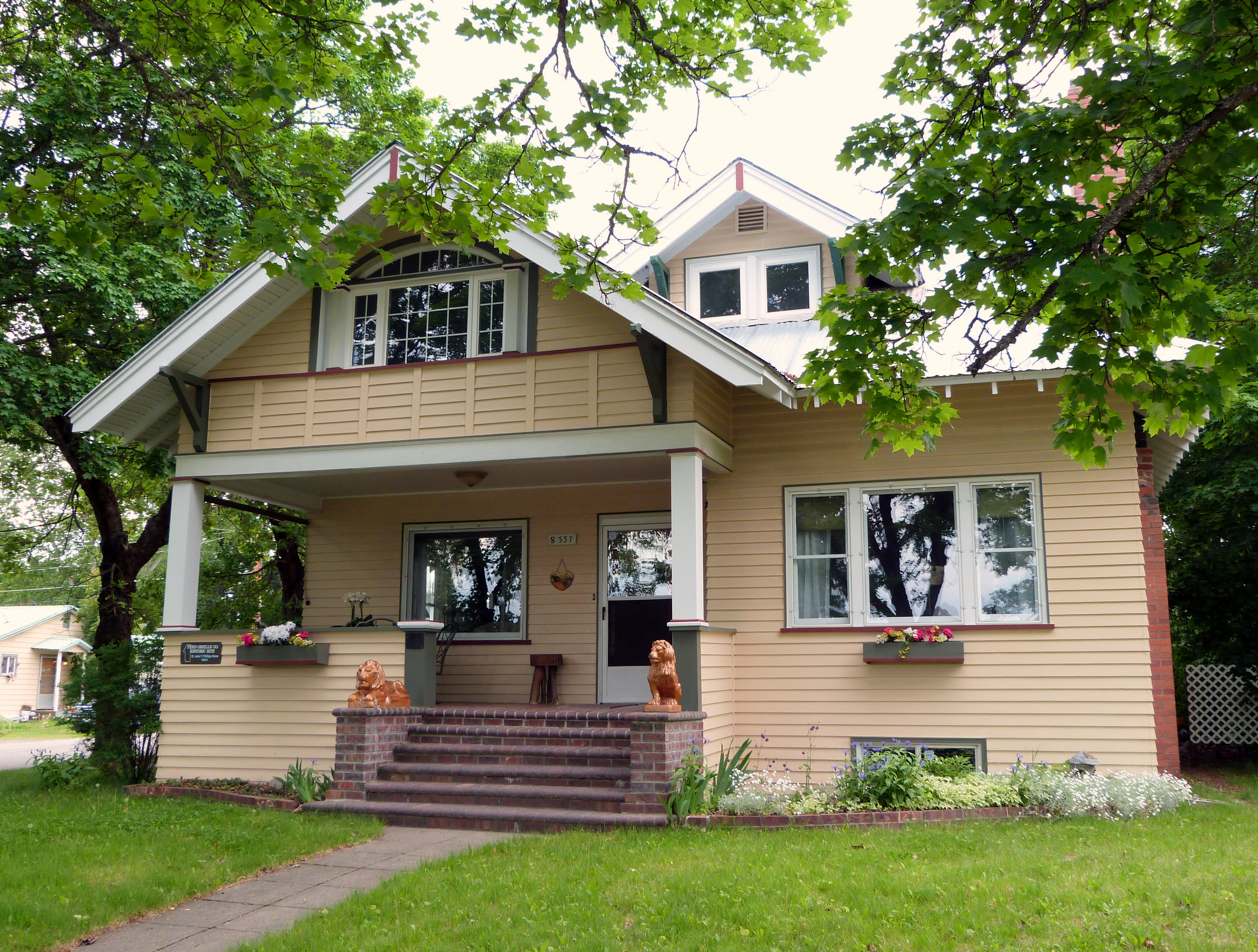
- The Phillips House in 2015

- Location within Washington (state)
- Location: S. 337 Spokane Avenue; Newport, Washington
- Coordinates: 48°10′42″N 117°02′45″W
- Area: less than one acre
- Built: 1914
- Built by: Sewell, Harold A.; Siggins, A.J.
- Architectural style: Bungalow/craftsman
- NRHP reference No.: 05001501
- Added to NRHP: January 3, 2006

The Dr. John and Viola Phillips House and Office, at S. 337 Spokane Ave. in Newport, Washington, is a historic house built in 1914. It includes Bungalow/craftsman architecture. It was listed on the National Register of Historic Places in 2006.

It was deemed significant for association with "pioneer"-era physician Dr. John Phillips and wife Viola, a registered nurse, who together served Newport from an office portion of this house, and also for its architecture. It is "a representative example" of a Craftsman-style bungalow. It was a work of local architect/engineer Harold A. Sewell and is well preserved. Dr. Phillips served Newport for 25 years, 13 in this house. Earlier he had bought an open-sided Mitchell automobile in 1907, the first car in Newport, which he used to rescue residents and help fire fighters during the "Big Smoke", the Great Fire of 1910.
