= 186th New York Infantry Regiment =

- Active: September 5, 1864 - June 2, 1865
- Country: United States
- Allegiance: Union Army
- Branch: Army
- Type: Infantry
- Engagements: Battle of Boydton Plank Road; Battle of Fort Stedman; Siege of Petersburg

Commanders
- Colonel: Bradley Winslow
- Lieutenant Colonel: E. Jay Marsh
- Major: Abraham D. Sternberg

The 186th New York Infantry Regiment (Also called the 186th New York Volunteer Regiment, or simply the 186th New York Infantry) was an infantry regiment of the Union Army during the American Civil War.

== Service ==
The companies of the regiment were mustered in from September 5, 1864, to September 29, 1864, in Sacketts Harbor, New York. The regiment fought in the Battle of Boydton Plank Road from October 27 to October 28, 1864, as well as the Battle of Fort Stedman on March 25, 1865, and the Appomattox Campaign from March 29, 1865, to April 9, 1865. Most notably, the regiment assisted to capture forts during the Siege of Petersburg on April 2, 1865, capturing Fort Mahone. The regiment was mustered out on June 2, 1865. Soldiers in the regiment were transferred to the 79th New York Infantry Regiment.

== Casualties ==
88 deaths from the regiment were reported, with 33 men being killed in action, 15 men killed of wounds received in action, 40 other men, including 1 officer, of disease or other causes.

== See also ==
- List of New York Civil War regiments
- New York in the Civil War
