= Winslow House =

Winslow House may refer to:

in the United States (by state then city)

- Winslow House (River Forest, Illinois), a Frank Lloyd Wright-designed home listed on the National Register of Historic Places (NRHP) in Cook County
- Borden–Winslow House, Fall River, Massachusetts, listed on the NRHP in Bristol County
- Luther Winslow Jr. House, Fall River, Massachusetts, listed on the NRHP in Bristol County
- Isaac Winslow House, Marshfield, Massachusetts, listed on the NRHP
- Winslow–Haskell Mansion, Newton, Massachusetts, listed on the NRHP in Middlesex County
- Winslow–Turner Carriage House, Plattsburgh, New York, listed on the NRHP in Clinton County
- Wilson–Winslow House, Coventry, Rhode Island, listed on the NRHP in Kent County
- Earle Micajah Winslow House, Arlington, Virginia, listed on the NRHP in Arlington County
- Colburn T. Winslow House, Colville, Washington, listed on the NRHP in Stevens County, Washington
- George F. Winslow House, Eau Claire, Wisconsin, listed on the NRHP in Eau Claire County, Wisconsin

== See also ==
- Goodwinslow, Raleigh, Tennessee, listed on the NRHP in Shelby County, Tennessee
- Winslow Hall, house in Winslow, Buckinghamshire, United Kingdom
