= 68th Pennsylvania Infantry Regiment =

Union Army infantry regiment

68th Pennsylvania Volunteer Infantry
- Active: August 4, 1862 – June 9, 1865
- Country: United States of America
- Allegiance: Union
- Branch: Infantry
- Engagements: Battle of Fredericksburg; Battle of Chancellorsville; Battle of Gettysburg; Bristoe Campaign; Mine Run Campaign; Battle of the Wilderness; Battle of Spotsylvania Court House; Battle of Totopotomoy Creek; Battle of Cold Harbor; Siege of Petersburg; Third Battle of Petersburg

The 68th Pennsylvania Volunteer Infantry was an infantry regiment that served in the Union Army during the American Civil War.

== Service ==
The 68th Pennsylvania Infantry was organized at Philadelphia, Pennsylvania and mustered on August 4, 1862 for a three-year enlistment under the command of Colonel Andrew H. Tippin.

The regiment was attached to 1st Brigade, 1st Division, III Corps, Army of the Potomac, to March 1864. 1st Brigade, 3rd Division, II Corps, Army of the Potomac, to April 1864. Provost Guard, Army of the Potomac, to April 1865. Collis' Independent Brigade, IX Corps, April 1865. Hart's Island, N.Y. Harbor, Department of the East, to June 1865.

The 68th Pennsylvania Infantry mustered out June 9, 1865.

== Detailed service ==
Left Pennsylvania for Washington, D.C., September 1, 1862. Camp at Arlington Heights until October. Moved to Poolesville, Md.. March up the Potomac to Leesburg, then to Falmouth, Va., October 11-November 19, 1862. Battle of Fredericksburg, Va., December 12–15. Burnside's 2nd Campaign, "Mud March," January 20–24, 1863. At Falmouth until April. Chancellorsville Campaign April 27-May 6. Battle of Chancellorsville May 1–5. Gettysburg Campaign June 13-July 24. Battle of Gettysburg July 1–3. Pursuit of Lee July 5–24. Whapping Heights, Va., July 23. Duty on line of the Rappahannock until October. Bristoe Campaign October 9–22. Auburn October 13. Auburn and Bristoe October 14. Advance to line of the Rappahannock November 7–8. Kelly's Ford November 7. Mine Run Campaign November 26-December 2. Payne's Farm November 27. At Brandy Station until April 1864. Demonstration on the Rapidan February 6–7. Rapidan Campaign May 4-June 12. Assigned to provost duty at Meade's Headquarters April 18. Battle of the Wilderness May 5–7. Spotsylvania Court House May 8–21. Guinea Station May 21. North Anna River May 23–26. On line of the Pamunkey May 26–28. Totopotomoy May 28–31. Cold Harbor June 1–12. Before Petersburg June 16–18. Siege operations against Petersburg and Richmond June 16, 1864 to April 2, 1865. Garrison and provost duty at City Point, Va., June 18, 1864 to April 1, 1865. Assault on and fall of Petersburg April 2. Occupation of Petersburg April 3. Moved from before Petersburg to Hart's Island, N.Y. Harbor, April 1865, and duty there guarding prisoners until June.

== Casualties ==
The regiment lost a total of 122 men during service; 10 officers and 61 enlisted men killed or mortally wounded, 51 enlisted men died of disease.

== Commanders ==
- Colonel Andrew H. Tippin - captured and held as a prisoner of war October 14, 1863 to June 25, 1864
- Lieutenant Colonel Anthony H. Reynolds - discharged October 14, 1863 due to wounds received in action at the Battle of Gettysburg
- Lieutenant Colonel Robert Emmet Winslow
- Captain Milton S. Davis - commanded the regiment at the Battle of Gettysburg after Col Tippen succeeded to brigade command

== See also ==
- List of Pennsylvania Civil War Units
- Pennsylvania in the Civil War
