= Justice Winslow =

Justice Winslow may refer to:

- John B. Winslow (1851–1920), associate justice of the Wisconsin Supreme Court
- Walter C. Winslow (1882–1962), temporary associate justice of the Oregon Supreme Court

== See also ==
- Justise Winslow (born 1996), American professional basketball player
