= Admiral Winslow (disambiguation) =

Cameron Winslow (1854–1932) was a U.S. Navy admiral. Admiral Winslow may also refer to:

- Herbert Winslow (1848–1914), U.S. Navy rear admiral
- John Ancrum Winslow (1811–1873), U.S. Navy rear admiral

== See also ==
- Alfred Winsloe (1852–1931), British Royal Navy admiral
