= Albion Ballenger =

Albion Ballenger was a 19th-century Seventh-day Adventist minister and author.

== Biography ==
Born as Albion Fox in 1861 on a farm near Winslow, Illinois, Albion was a son of Seventh-day Adventist Church minister John Fox Ballenger. In the 1880s he was a religious liberty advocate and five years later got a license from the Seventh-day Adventist church. In 1890 Ballenger was elected as secretary of the National Religious Liberty Association and by 1893 served as assistant editor of the American Sentinel magazine. In 1897 he began a movement called Receive Ye the Holy Ghost, which also became his most popular sermon. The same year he wrote a book called Power for Witnessing which is still available as a reprint. In the early 20th century he was invited to Great Britain as an evangelist. During this time, he began to re-examine the Seventh-day Adventist denomination's doctrine of the "sanctuary." He came to the conclusion that the Adventist doctrine of the sanctuary needed to be revised to conform to the biblical types and the teaching of the Book of Hebrews. He rewrote Seventh-day Adventist doctrine of the sanctuary typology by adding the interpretation explicated in the Epistle to the Hebrews.

== Controversy and punishment ==
His position was that Christ entered the Holy of Holies, which was part of the Tabernacle, immediately after the resurrection, and did not wait until 1844. On May 20, 1905, the General Conference Session examined his views and warned him not to publish them. The same day, a Seventh-day Adventist prophet named Ellen White decided to join in the opposition against his views by issuing a letter in which she accused him of being part of a satanic agency. On May 24, 1905, she published another letter of accusation in which she stated that he had made a specious error and demanded he accept the church's position. He refused to do this and was fired. Over the next couple of years White issued seven more letters of accusation which were published on January 30, 1906, June 29 of the same year and on July 4, 1907, respectively. In 1909 Ballenger wrote a book called Cast Out for the Cross of Christ in which he expressed his views and in 1914 founded a magazine called The Gathering Call. His views were never accepted by the church. He died in 1921.
