= Mary Chilton =

First European woman to step ashore at Plymouth, Massachusetts

Mary Winslow
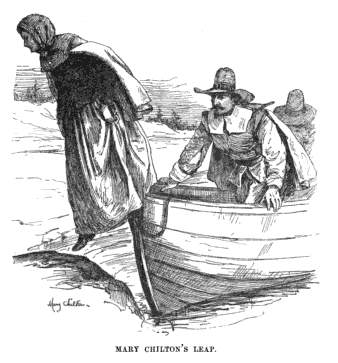
- Mary Chilton leaping onto Plymouth Rock before the other Pilgrims
- Born: Mary Chilton bap. May 31, 1607; Sandwich, Kent
- Died: before May 16, 1679; Boston, Massachusetts Bay Colony
- Known for: First European woman to land on Plymouth Rock
- Spouse: John Winslow from between 1623-1627 to 1674
- Relatives: James Chilton (father)

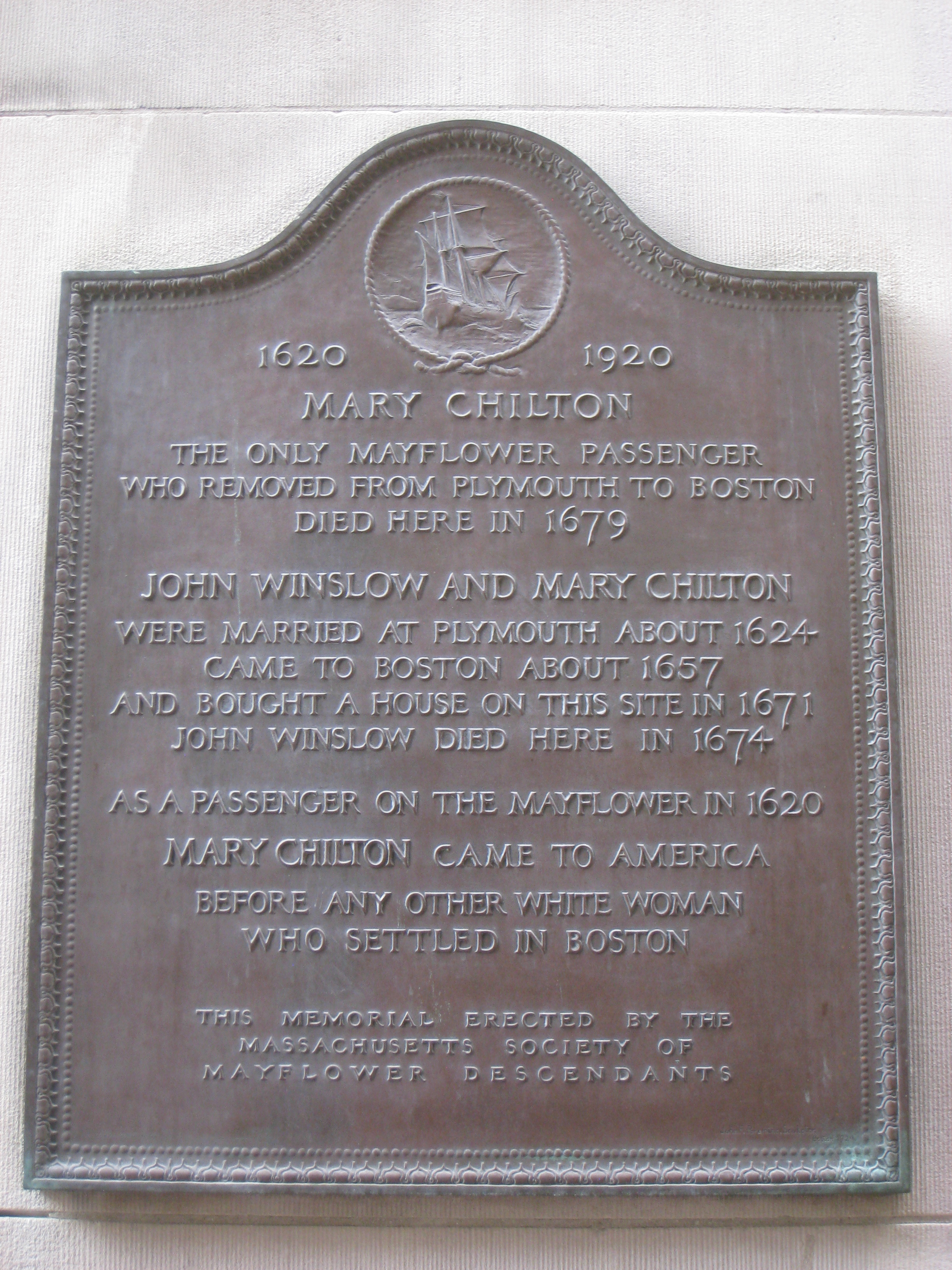
Mary Chilton plaque, Spring Lane in Boston, MA

Mary Chilton Winslow (née Chilton, b. 1607 – d. c. 1679) was a Pilgrim and purportedly the first European woman to step ashore at Plymouth, Massachusetts.

== Biography ==
Mary Chilton was baptized on May 31, 1607 in Sandwich, Kent, England and was the daughter of the Mayflower passenger, James Chilton. Mary Chilton's mother's name has been listed as "Susannah, possibly Furner" in many places. The mother is listed by William Bradford as "Mrs. Chilton" or "James Chilton's wife"--he may have never known her given name. At the age of thirteen, Mary Chilton accompanied her parents on the voyage to Plymouth. Her father, age sixty-four, was the oldest passenger on the Mayflower.

Her father died on December 18, 1620, while the Mayflower was anchored in Provincetown Harbor, and her mother died six weeks later on January 21, 1621, shortly after arriving at Plymouth. Both died of "the first infection of the disease" reported by Governor William Bradford in 1650. Chilton was given three shares in the land division of 1623, one for herself and one each for her deceased parents. Her property was situated between those of Standish and John Howland.

She was one of eleven minor girls on the Mayflower, nine of whom survived the first year at Plymouth Rock and would have been present at the time of the famous First Thanksgiving in 1621. In contrast, only four of the 14 adult women survived the first year.

She married John Winslow (possibly on October 12, 1624) and thus became the sister-in-law of Mayflower passenger Edward Winslow. They had ten children: John, Susannah, Mary, Edward, Sarah, Samuel, Joseph, Isaac, an unnamed child who probably died in infancy, and Benjamin. All but Benjamin married, and Benjamin's birth is the only one listed in the records of Plymouth colony.

The family moved to Boston sometime after the birth of Benjamin in 1653. There John Winslow is said to have prospered as a merchant.

She made out a will on July 31, 1676 (one of two female passengers from the Mayflower who did so, Elizabeth Tilley being the other) and died before May 1, 1679 in Boston.

== Legend ==
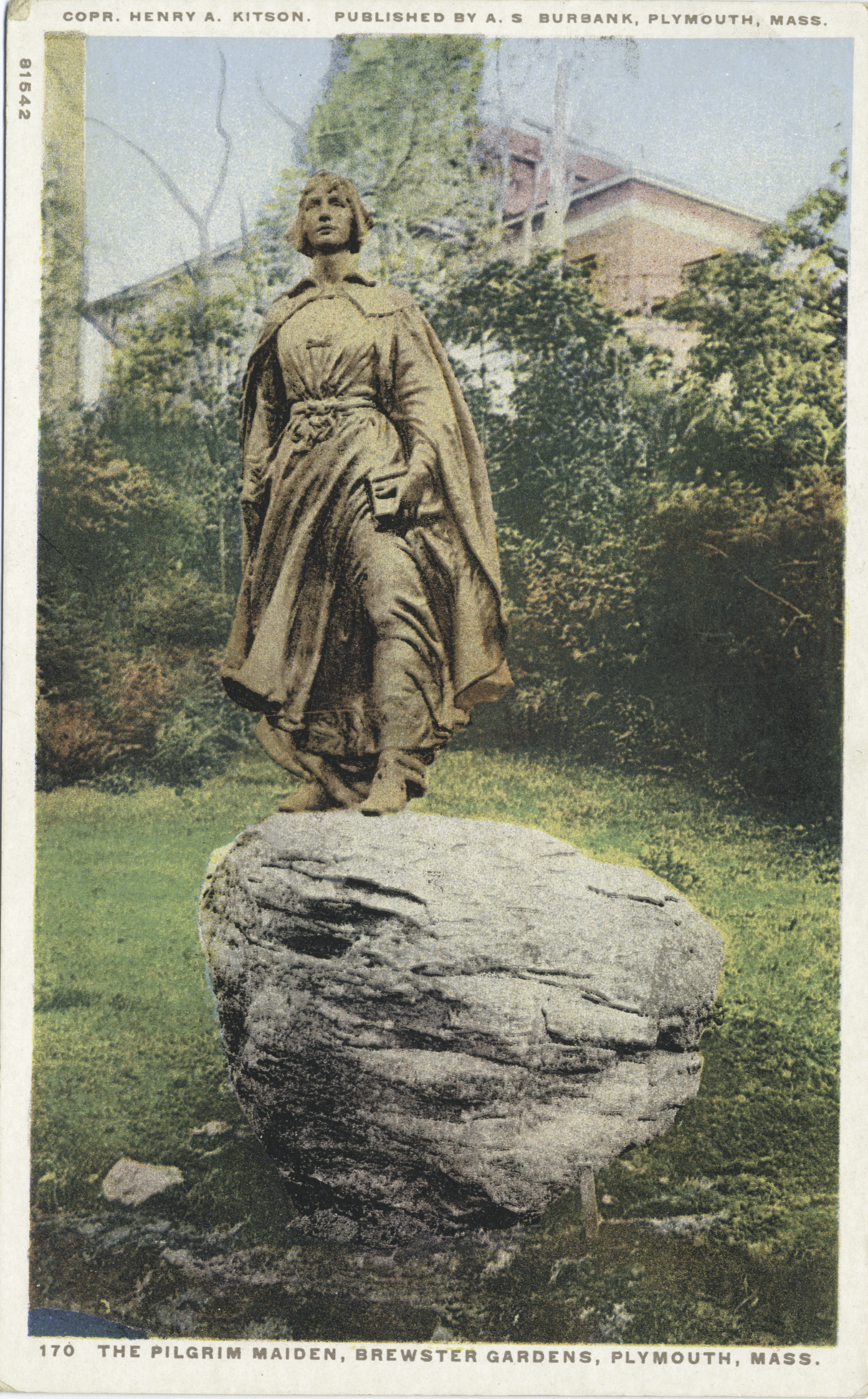
The Pilgrim Maiden, Brewster Gardens, Plymouth, Massachusetts. This statue is not of a particular Pilgrim, but it most closely fits Elizabeth Tilley and Mary Chilton in age.

By legend, Chilton was the first passenger to step ashore at Plymouth, seemingly so excited that she jumped out of the small boat and waded ashore onto "Plymouth Rock."

The Chilton Club, a private social club in Boston, MA, was named in her honor.

== Notable descendants ==
Notable descendants of Mary Chilton include:

- Edward Winslow, silversmith and military leader
- Nicholas Gilman, signer of the U.S. Constitution
- Lucretia Garfield, First Lady of the United States
- George H. W. Bush and George W. Bush, Presidents of the United States
- John Chilton McAuliff, member-elect of the Virginia House of Delegates
- Robert Warren Miller, businessman, and his daughters Pia Getty, Marie-Chantal, Crown Princess of Greece, and Alexandra von Fürstenberg
- Howard Dean, Governor of Vermont and presidential candidate
- John F. MacArthur, American Pastor and author
- Edward Winslow Hincks, American Civil War General Officer
