= Bill Borcher =

American basketball coach (1919–2003)

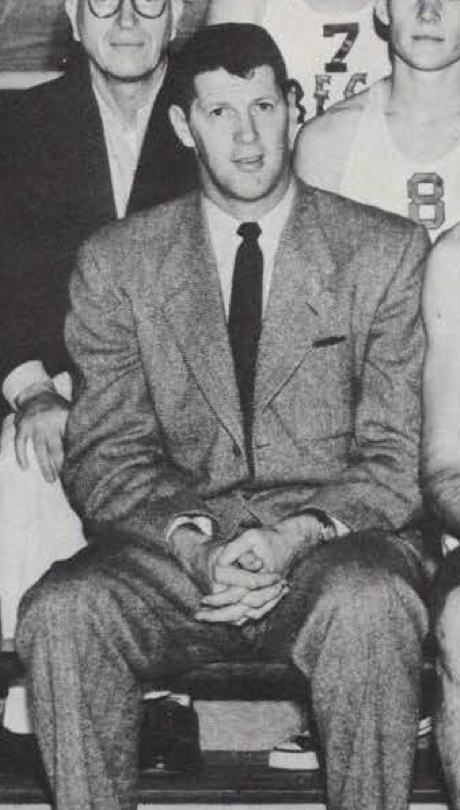
- Borcher in the 1952 Oregana

Biographical details
- Born: July 12, 1919; International Falls, Minnesota, U.S.
- Died: April 6, 2003 (aged 83); Coos Bay, Oregon, U.S.

Playing career
- 1937–1939: Sacramento CC
- 1939–1941: Oregon
- Positions: Forward, center

Coaching career (HC unless noted)
- 1945–1951: Marshfield HS
- 1951–1956: Oregon

Head coaching record
- Overall: 69–68 (college)

William J. Borcher (July 12, 1919 – April 6, 2003) was an American basketball coach, the head coach at the University of Oregon from 1951 to 1956.

== Early years ==
Born in International Falls, Minnesota, he attended North Bend High School in North Bend, Oregon, where he played both football and basketball. After graduation in 1937, he played basketball for Sacramento Junior College in California, then transferred up to Eugene and played for two seasons at Oregon under head coach Howard Hobson, At 6 ft 4 in (1.93 m) he was a forward and center, and also a played a season of football in 1941 at end. During World War II, Borcher served in the U.S. Navy from 1942 to 1945.

== Head coach ==
From 1945 to 1951, Borcher was the head basketball coach at Marshfield High School in Coos Bay. His 1947 team won the state championship and that year he founded the Oregon Jazz Band. After six seasons at Marshfield, Borcher moved up to the collegiate level in 1951 as the head coach at Oregon. He compiled a 69–68 (.504) record in five seasons, and resigned in March 1956. He was succeeded by Steve Belko, who remained for fifteen seasons.

== Jazz festival ==
An accomplished musician, he excelled on the coronet, and played the drums and bass fiddle as well. After coaching, he continued with the Oregon Jazz Band. He gained his doctorate in education from Oregon in 1964 and then worked in administration at American River JC in Sacramento. In 1972, Borcher founded the Sacramento Jazz Jubilee, which is the largest jazz festival in the world. He was inducted into the North Bend High School hall of fame in 2001, and posthumously into Marshfield's in 2003.

== Head coaching record ==
=== College ===
Record table
Season	Team	Overall	Conference	Standing	Postseason
Oregon Webfoots (Pacific Coast Conference) (1951–1956)
1951–52	Oregon	14–16	8–8	3rd (North)	
1952–53	Oregon	14–14	8–8	T–2nd (North)	
1953–54	Oregon	17–10	9–7	T–2nd (North)	
1954–55	Oregon	13–13	8–8	2nd (North)	
1955–56	Oregon	11–15	5–11	T–6th	
Oregon:		69–68	38–42		
Total:		69–68			
