= John Winslow (politician) =

American politician and soldier (1802–1874)

The Honorable John Francis Winslow
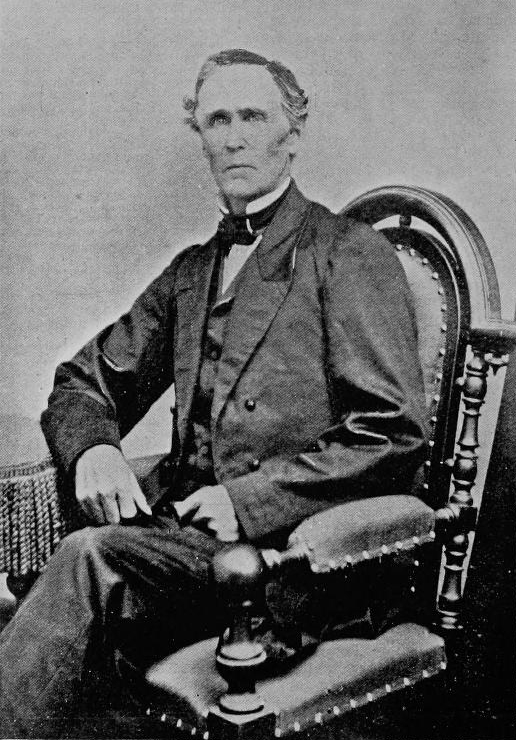
- John Winslow sometime before 1874
- Born: December 19, 1802; Woodstock, Vermont, US
- Died: July 7, 1874 (aged 71); Watertown, New York, US
- Burial place: Brookside Cemetery, Watertown, New York
- Education: Lowville, New York
- Spouse: Betsey Collins (married 1827–1843); Sarah Bates (married 1844–1874)
- Children: Bradley Winslow; Norris Winslow; Betsey Winslow; Lucy Winslow; Jennie Winslow; John WInslow
- Parent: Samuel Winslow (father); Lucy Winslow (mother)

John Winslow (December 19, 1802 – July 7, 1874) was an American soldier and politician.

== Early life and career ==
John Winslow was born on December 19, 1802, in Woodstock, Vermont, to Lucy and Samuel Winslow. In May, 1807, his parents moved from Woodstock to a log cabin in a forest 2.75 miles away from the city of Watertown, New York, where Winslow lived for most of his life until he moved away on January 7, 1870. He did not receive much education, but he attended Lowville Academy in Lowville, New York for one term.

On January 19, 1826, Winslow became ensign of the 76th Infantry Regiment. In 1827 he was promoted lieutenant, and on September 26, 1828, he was promoted to captain. During the 1849 New York state election, he became a member of the 73rd New York State Legislature in the first district, as a democrat. In 1853 he became president of the Jefferson County Agricultural Society.

== Personal life and death ==
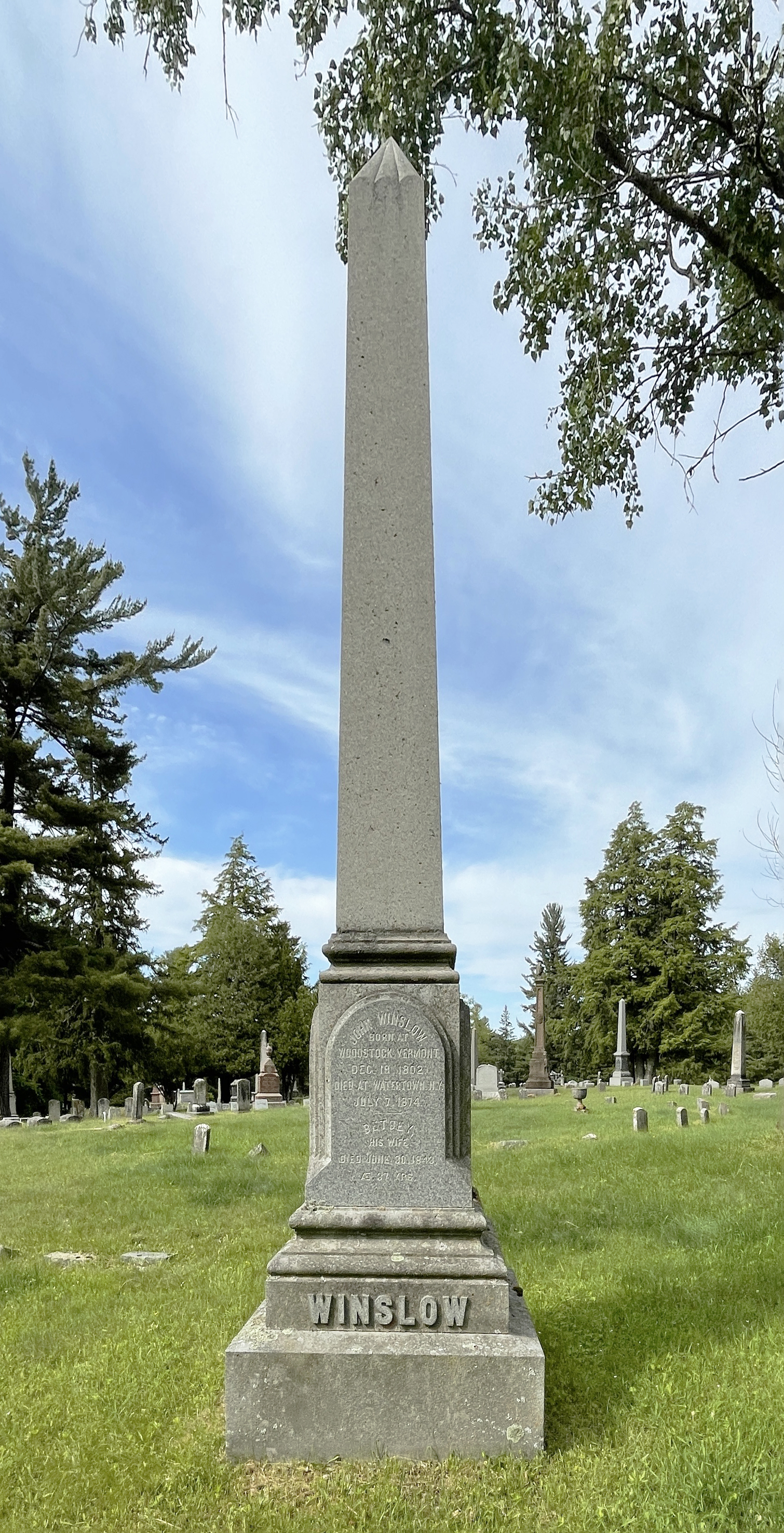
John Winslow's gravestone in Brookside Cemetery in Watertown, New York

On October 18, 1827, Winslow married Betsey Collins. They had five children, Bradley, Norris, Betsey, Lucy, and Jennie. Collins died in 1843. John remarried to Sarah Bates on May 23, 1844. The couple had one son. John Winslow died on July 7, 1874, in the city of Watertown from congestion. He was buried in Brookside Cemetery in Watertown, New York.
