= Winslow (given name) =

Winslow is a masculine given name. Notable people with the name include:

People:

- Winslow Alagaratnam (1895–1977), Sri Lankan Tamil civil engineer
- Winslow Ames (1907–1990), American art historian and museum director
- Winslow Anderson (1917–2007), American painter, ceramicist and glass designer
- Winslow Ashby (born 1953), Barbadian cricketer
- Winslow Briggs (1928–2019), American biologist
- Winslow Carlton (1907–1994), American businessman
- Winslow Corbett (born 1979), American actress
- Winslow Eliot (born 1956), American novelist
- Winslow W. Griesser (1856–1931), American station keeper in the United States Life-Saving Service
- Winslow Hall (rower) (1912–1995), American rower
- Winslow Homer (1836–1910), American landscape painter and printmaker
- Winslow Lewis (1770–1850), American lighthouse builder
- Winslow Lovejoy, American college football player
- Winslow McCleary (1886–1973), Canadian rower
- Winslow Oliver (born 1973), American football player
- Winslow Terrill (1870–1897), American baseball player
- Winslow Upton (1853–1914), American astronomer
- Winslow Warren (1838–1930), American attorney
- Winslow Wilson (1892–1974), American painter

Fictional characters:

- Winslow Leach, the protagonist of the 1974 horror film Phantom of the Paradise
- Winslow T. Oddfellow, from the animated television series CatDog
- Winslow, a character in Questionable Content
- Winslow, a character in It's a Big Big World
- Winslow Schott/Toyman from DC Comics.
