= Winslow Township, Illinois =

Winslow Township
- Township
- Location in Stephenson County
- Coordinates: 42°29′05″N 89°50′19″W
- Country: United States
- State: Illinois
- County: Stephenson

Government
  - Supervisor: Joe Blair

Area
  - Total: 28.78 sq mi (74.5 km^{2})
  - Land: 28.78 sq mi (74.5 km^{2})
  - Water: 0 sq mi (0 km^{2}) 0%
- Elevation: 951 ft (290 m)

Population (2010)
  - Estimate (2016): 614
  - Density: 22/sq mi (8.5/km^{2})
- Time zone: UTC-6 (CST)
  - Summer (DST): UTC-5 (CDT)
- FIPS code: 17-177-82556

Winslow Township is located in Stephenson County, Illinois. As of the 2010 census, its population was 633 and it contained 283 housing units. The village of Winslow is located in the township.

== Geography ==
Winslow is Township 29 North, Range 5 (part) and 6 East of the Fourth Principal Meridian.

According to the 2010 census, the township has a total area of 28.78 square miles (74.5 km^{2}), all land.

== Demographics ==
Historical population
Census	Pop.	Note	%±
2016 (est.)	614
U.S. Decennial Census
