= Winslow, Illinois =

Winslow
- Village
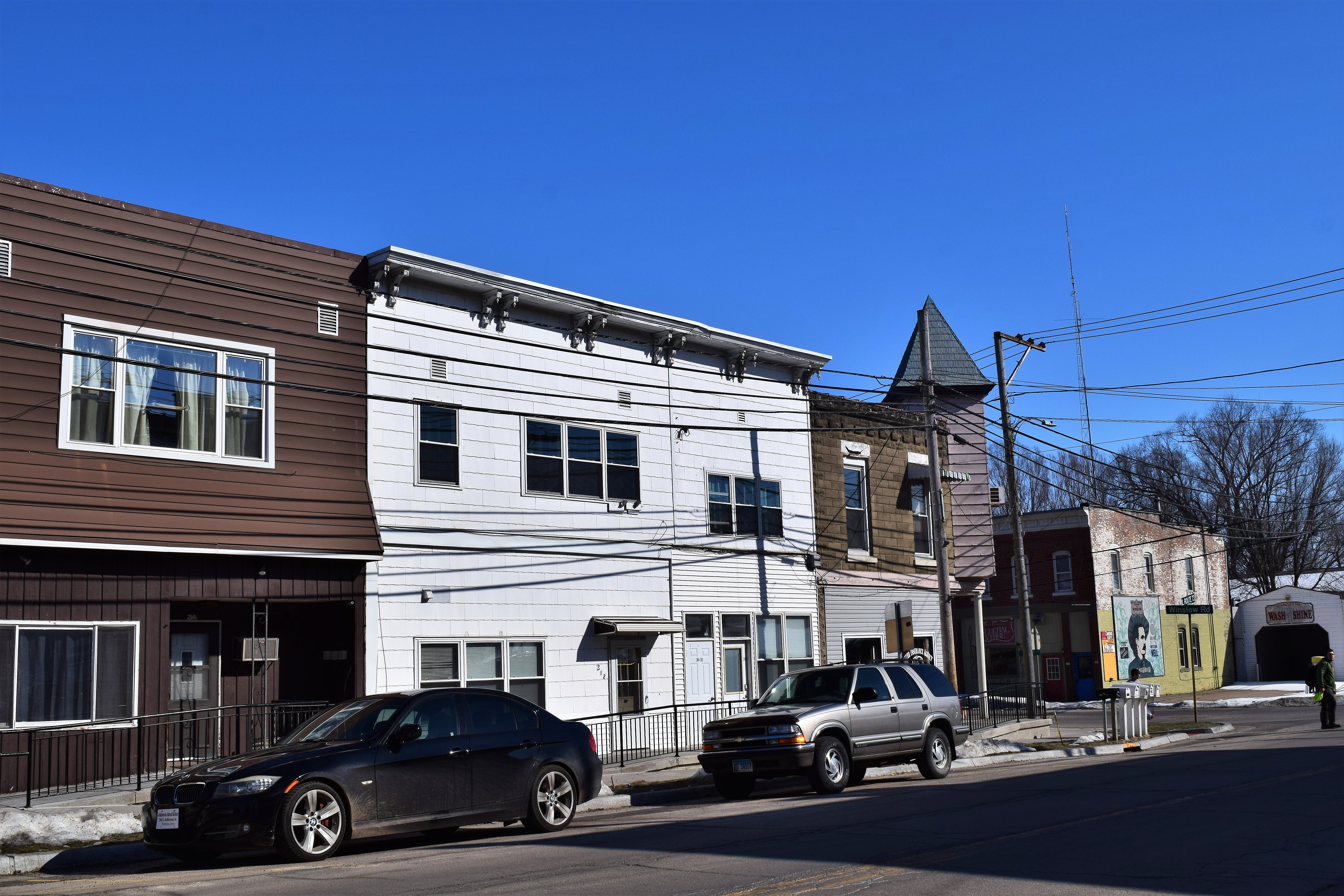
- Buildings in downtown Winslow

- Location of Winslow in Stephenson County, Illinois.
- Coordinates: 42°29′46″N 89°47′42″W
- Country: United States
- State: Illinois
- County: Stephenson
- Township: Winslow

Area
  - Total: 0.46 sq mi (1.19 km^{2})
  - Land: 0.46 sq mi (1.19 km^{2})
  - Water: 0 sq mi (0.00 km^{2})
- Elevation: 781 ft (238 m)

Population (2020)
  - Total: 281
  - Density: 613.5/sq mi (236.86/km^{2})
- Time zone: UTC-6 (CST)
  - Summer (DST): UTC-5 (CDT)
- ZIP code: 61089
- Area code: 815
- FIPS code: 17-82543
- GNIS feature ID: 2399721

Winslow is a village in Stephenson County, Illinois. As of the 2020 census, Winslow had a population of 281.

== Geography ==
According to the 2010 census, Winslow has a total area of 0.45 square miles (1.17 km^{2}), all land.

== Demographics ==
Historical population
Census	Pop.	Note	%±
1880	330		—
1890	332		0.6%
1900	405		22.0%
1910	426		5.2%
1920	371		−12.9%
1930	359		−3.2%
1940	379		5.6%
1950	355		−6.3%
1960	366		3.1%
1970	330		−9.8%
1980	361		9.4%
1990	317		−12.2%
2000	345		8.8%
2010	338		−2.0%
2020	281		−16.9%
U.S. Decennial Census

As of the census of 2000, there were 345 people, 134 households, and 95 families residing in the village. The population density was 773.1 inhabitants per square mile (298.5/km^{2}). There were 150 housing units at an average density of 336.1 per square mile (129.8/km^{2}). The racial makeup of the village was 96.52% White, 1.16% Native American, 0.29% Asian, and 2.03% from two or more races. Hispanic or Latino of any race were 2.32% of the population.

There were 134 households, out of which 32.8% had children under the age of 18 living with them, 56.0% were married couples living together, 11.2% had a female householder with no husband present, and 28.4% were non-families. 24.6% of all households were made up of individuals, and 10.4% had someone living alone who was 65 years of age or older. The average household size was 2.57 and the average family size was 3.02.

In the village, the population was spread out, with 27.2% under the age of 18, 7.2% from 18 to 24, 26.1% from 25 to 44, 25.8% from 45 to 64, and 13.6% who were 65 years of age or older. The median age was 38 years. For every 100 females, there were 99.4 males. For every 100 females aged 18 and over, there were 91.6 males.

The median income for a household in the village was $42,679, and the median income for a family was $46,250. Males had a median income of $28,214 versus $24,844 for females. The per capita income for the village was $15,595. About 5.5% of families and 5.5% of the population were below the poverty line, including 3.9% of those under age 18 and 11.9% of those age 65 or over.

== Government ==
Mayor of Winslow is Ronald Piña. The Treasurer is Jennifer Milliken and the Clerk is Amy Hester-Campbell.

== Notable people ==
- Albion Ballenger (1861–1921), Seventh-day Adventist minister and author
- William Frank Carver, expert marksman and owner of a Wild West exhibition
