= Winslow High School =

Winslow High School can refer to the following schools in the United States:

- Winslow High School (Arizona)
- Winslow High School (Maine)
- Winslow Township High School, New Jersey
- Winslow High School, fictional setting of the American television series Boston Public

== See also ==
- Lena-Winslow High School, Lena, Illinois
