= John Winslow (1597–1674) =

Mayflower passenger (1597–1674)

John Winslow (1597–1674) was one of several Winslow brothers who came to the Plymouth Colony in its earliest years. His brothers Edward and Gilbert were passengers on the Mayflower in 1620. John Winslow was a passenger on the Fortune in 1621, and two other brothers, Kenelm and Josiah, also settled in New England, arriving before 1632. The Winslow family were involved in all aspects of the Plymouth Colony, producing in the 17th century several governors and making their mark in New England history in both government and business.

== English origins ==
John Winslow was born April 16, 1597, in Droitwich, Worcestershire, England. He grew up in Droitwich, Worcestershire, residing there with his parents, Edward Winslow and Magdalene Oliver/Ollyver, one step-brother, four brothers and two sisters. His father was a salt extractor.

== Life in New England ==
Winslow was a brother of Pilgrim leader Edward Winslow and came to Plymouth in 1621 on the ship Fortune. He was unmarried upon his arrival.

Winslow is next mentioned in the 1623 Division of Land, John Winslow, as a single person, had one aker (acre) assigned to him. In 1626, his name appears on the 53-name list of Purchasers, who were prominent colony men involved in Plymouth investments. Winslow is mentioned next in the 1627 Division of Cattle (also used as a quasi-census), his name appears on the list of Lot 3 with the Standish family and other Winslows, including his brother Edward and wife Susanna (White) and her sons by Pilgrim William White - Resolved and Peregrine. All were Mayflower passengers. Winslow's wife Mary and their son John appear on the list for Lot 6 with other families. He was declared a freeman in 1633 and became active in the government of the colony. On July 1, 1633, and again on January 3, 1636/37, the General Court ordered that the passage between Green's Harbor and the sea be enlarged, and the governor, and Assistants, and John Winslow and other prominent men were assigned to apportion costs to "every man" and to supervise the work there, with ten men working at a time. On July 25, 1633, the court noted that John Beavan had covenanted to serve John Winslow as an apprentice for six years and at the end of the term Winslow was to give to him twelve bushels of Indian corn and twenty-five acres of land. On July 23, 1634, Mr. Timothy Hatherly turned over the remaining term of his servant Ephraim Tinkham to John Winslow, and Winslow was obligated to perform the conditions expressed in the indenture. On March 3, 1634/35, John Winslow was on a committee to assess colonists for the costs of the watch and other charges.

As early as January 5, 1635/6, John Winslow, his brother Kenelm Winslow, John Doane and other prominent men were chosen to assist the governor and council to set rates on goods to be sold and wages paid laborers. The court not only regulated prices, but sometimes quality. He is next mentioned on November 2, 1636, where he turned over the (indentured) services of Edmond Weston for two years to Nathaniel Thomas, on behalf of the latter's father, Mr. William Thomas. Monies and goods were to be exchanged in the process. Winslow was on the committee in 1637 to assess taxes for the cost of sending men to the Pequot War. Winslow continued to be very active in the colonial government and in 1638 and his brother Kenelm were witnesses against Stephen Hopkins for selling wine at excessive rates.

Winslow also served as a juror in the trial of Arthur Peach, Richard Stinnings, and Thomas Jackson for the murder of Penowanyanquis, which was considered the first jury trial for a serious crime in Plymouth Colony history.

Many of the more prosperous men had indentured servants. John Winslow was one of them. Records show that on July 28, 1640, he sold for £12 the services of Joseph Grosse for five years to John Howland.

On yet another important committee, on October 17, 1642, Winslow was noted as one of several men appointed to grant lands for the town of Plymouth and in the 1643 list of "Men Able to Bear Arms", he appears with the men of Plymouth. He also served for two years as Deputy from Plymouth to the general court, and in 1653, Winslow became a member of "a counsell of war" (Council of War).

Winslow was well thought of and a man to be trusted as evidenced in a record which shows that on March 20, 1654/55, Stephen Tracy, who had returned to England and was residing at Great Yarmouth in Norfolk, gave power of attorney to John Winslow of Plymouth to dispose of his estate in New England for the benefit of his son John Tracy, daughters, Ruth Tracy and Mary Tracy, and the rest of his five children. John Tracy married Mary Prence, daughter of Governor Thomas Prence.

On October 10, 1657, Mr. John Winslow of Plymouth sold all his house and land in Plymouth to Edward Gray, believed to be his son-in-law married to his daughter Mary, and moved to Boston, where he became a wealthy merchant and ship owner, as well as retaining lands in Plymouth.

Winslow was on the 1662 list of "first born" men of Plymouth to share in a land distribution, and he was one of the witnesses to the sale of land by Myles Standish in 1661.

On September 19, 1671, it is recorded that John bought for the sum of £500 in New England silver money "the Mansion or dwelling-house of the Late Antipas Voice with the gardens wood-yard and Backside as it is scituate lying and being in Boston aforesaid as it is nowe fenced in And is fronting & Facing to the Lane going to mr John Jolliffes." The Winslows lived in this house until his death in 1674 and that of Mary Chilton in 1679. The house (which would have been on Spring Lane) no longer exists.

== Family ==
John Winslow married Mary Chilton between 1623 and May 22, 1627, in Plymouth and had ten children. She had been baptized in St. Peter's Parish, Sandwich, Kent, England on May 31, 1607, and she died between July 31, 1676, and May 1, 1679, in Boston. In 1620, Mary and her parents had come to Plymouth as passengers on the Mayflower. Her parents died the first winter, with her father, James Chilton, named on several memorials in Provincetown in honor of those who were the earliest to die on board the Mayflower in November and December 1620. Tradition has it that Mary Chilton was the first Mayflower passenger to step ashore on Plymouth Rock.

== Will of John Winslow ==
The will of John Winslow, Senior of Boston, merchant, was dated March 12, 1673/74, and proved May 31, 1674. In the will he named his wife Mary, sons John, Isaac, Benjamin, Edward and Joseph; William Payne, the son of his daughter Sarah Middlecott; Parnell Winslow, daughter of his son Isaac; granddaughter Susanna Latham; son Edward's children; son Joseph Winslow's two children; granddaughter Mercy Harris's two children; kinsman Josiah Winslow "now governor of New Plimouth"; brother Josiah Winslow; kinswoman Eleanor Baker, the daughter of his brother Kenelm Winslow; "my seven children"; Mr. Paddy's widow; and his slave Jane. He left personal property valued at £3,000, a good part of it in money, and this was a substantial sum for the time.

== Death and burial ==
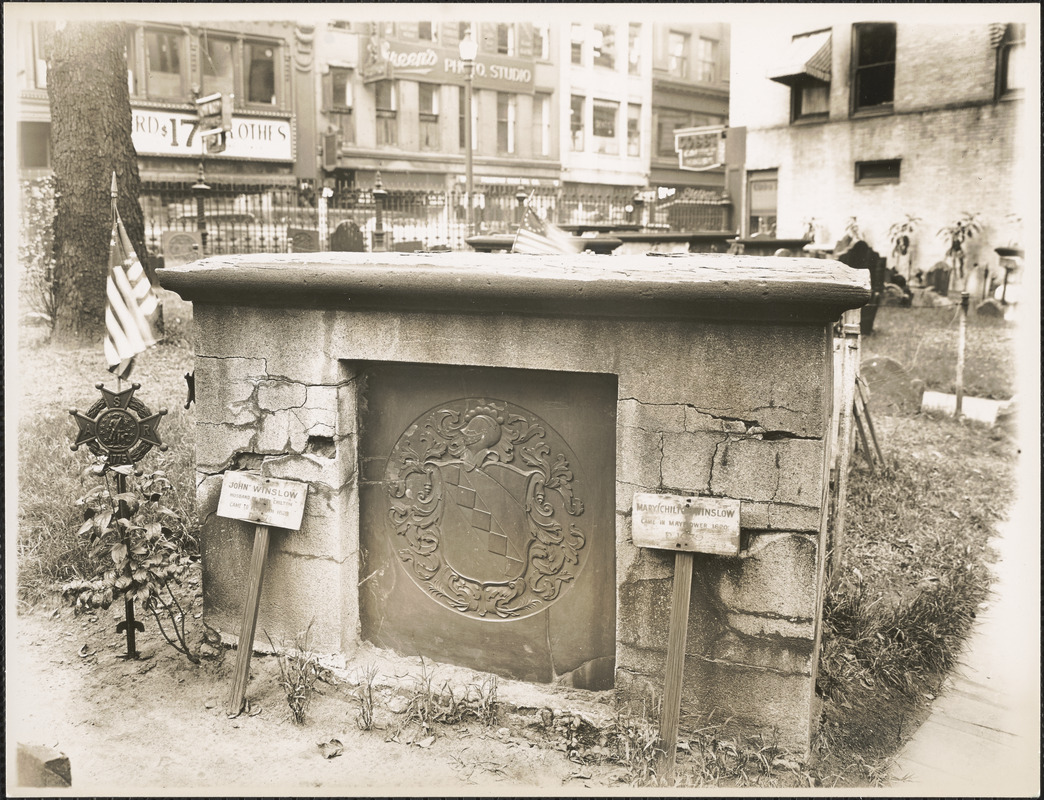
Grave of Mary Chilton Winslow, ca. 1920–1960. Leon Abdalian Collection, Boston Public Library

He died between March 12, 1673/4 and May 21, 1674, in Boston, Massachusetts Bay Colony. At the time of his death he was one of the wealthiest merchants in Boston. Both he and his wife were buried in King's Chapel Burying Ground in Boston. They both left wills that survive today.

His widow Mary survived him, but died before May 1678, and she dated her will, equally as detailed as her husband's, July 31, 1676, proved July 11, 1679.
