= Colburn T. Winslow House =

Mansion in Colville, Washington, US

The Colburn T. Winslow House, also known simply as Winslow House, is an historic mansion located in Colville, Washington, built in 1906. The house is listed on the National Register of Historic Places.

== History of Winslow House ==
Built by Colburn T. Winslow in 1906 the home was the largest residence in the city at the time of completion, and served as the family's residence while Colburn managed his business affairs in the Colville valley. When the Winslow family left the Colville area in the 1920s the home was sold to the Hayes family, who in turn sold it in the mid-1940s to the Schumaker family. Ms. Schumaker operated the home as a boarding house for several decades before selling it to a pair of self-styled property developers: Mr. Yost and Mr. Randall. These developers planned to restore the home to a single-family configuration and did much of the work to remove Ms. Schumaker's boarding house modifications. They eventually ran out of funds and sold the home to Larry and Ursula Ravencraft who planned to operate the home as a Bed and Breakfast. The Ravencrafts spent several years restoring many parts of the home, converting the second floor to a 4-bed/4-bath layout and converting the former servant's quarters on the third floor to a master suite. After the unexpected passing of Ursula in 2012 the house sat vacant and fell into disrepair until late 2020 when it was purchased by a local businessman and preservationist native to Colville.

Restoration efforts are currently underway.

The house was added to the National Register of Historic Places in 1990.
