= Sacramento Music Festival =

Music festival in California, US

- Genre: Jazz, rock, country, blues
- Dates: May
- Location(s): Sacramento, California
- Coordinates: 38°33′20″N 121°28′08″W
- Years active: 1974–2017

The Sacramento Music Festival (formerly the Old Sacramento Dixieland Jazz Jubilee) was held every Memorial Day weekend in Sacramento, California. It was organized by the Sacramento Traditional Jazz Society since 1974. The final festival was in 2017.

Peak attendance for the festival was 85,000 during the 1980s. It decreased after 2002. In 2011, organizers invited musicians from blues, country, and rock. Attendance in 2016 was 22,000 people. The festival concentrated on Dixieland jazz but also welcomed performers in swing, ragtime, barbershop, and zydeco.

Additionally, the festival had a significant traditional jazz youth band element, showcasing dozens of youth bands in hour long sets throughout the weekend. Many bands were local to the Sacramento area and were representatives of schools or private jazz clubs and other community organizations. However, youth bands from outside California were not uncommon, some hailing from as far away as Canada.
