= Jim Haney =

American basketball coach

Biographical details
- Born: c. 1949 (age 76–77)

Playing career
- 1967–1971: Penn

Coaching career (HC unless noted)
- 1971–1972: Oregon (GA)
- 1972–1978: Oregon (asst.)
- 1978–1983: Oregon

Administrative career (AD unless noted)
- 1983–1985: Metro Conference (asst. commissioner)
- 1985–1988: MVC (commissioner)
- 1988–1992: PCAA/Big West (commissioner)
- 1992–present: NABC (executive director)

Head coaching record
- Overall: 53–82 (.393)

Accomplishments and honors

Awards
- Coach Wooden "Keys to Life" Award (2007)

Jim Haney (born c. 1949) was the head basketball coach at the University of Oregon in Eugene for five seasons, from 1978 to 1983.

== Early years ==
Haney starred in basketball in Pennsylvania at Mt. Lebanon High School southwest of Pittsburgh, Pennsylvania, and graduated in 1967.

After considering Cornell and Rutgers, he played college basketball under head coach Dick Harter in the Ivy League at the University of Pennsylvania in Philadelphia, where he majored in chemical engineering. He sat out his freshman season after two surgeries for a dislocated kneecap, then played three seasons for the Quakers. He was voted the team's "most inspirational" player as a senior, as Penn won its first 28 games before falling in the Elite Eight to Philly neighbor Villanova. Haney earned a B.S.Ch.E. degree from Penn in 1971.

== Coaching ==
When Harter was hired at Oregon 1971, Haney chose coaching over engineering and became a graduate assistant on the Ducks' staff and was elevated to assistant coach the next year. Harter was known for his "Kamikaze Kids" defense and led the Ducks for seven seasons. When he left for Penn State in State College in 1978, Haney was promoted in March at age 29. His first contract as head coach was for three years at $29,000 per year.

Haney's best year in the Pac-10 was his first in 1979, when the Ducks were 7–11 and finished in a tie for sixth. Near the end of his fifth season, he resigned in March 1983 because of his uninspiring record, which was 53–82 (.388), and 27–63 (.300) in the Pac-10 conference. He had one year remaining on his contract, at just under $36,700 annually.

Haney was succeeded in Eugene by Don Monson, who had posted a 100–41 (.709) record in five years at Idaho in Moscow, with significant success against the northwest Pac-10 schools (3–0 against Haney's Ducks). The prior season in 1982, Monson's nationally-ranked Vandals were 27–3, third-seeded in the west regional, and advanced to the Sweet Sixteen.

== After coaching ==
Haney accepted an assistant's position at the University of Kansas under head coach Larry Brown, but before the season began he went to the Metro Conference as its assistant commissioner. He became commissioner in 1985 for the Missouri Valley Conference for three years and the PCAA for four years, which was renamed the Big West in 1992. He was the executive director of the National Association of Basketball Coaches from 1992 to July 2020.

== Head coaching record ==
Record table
Season	Team	Overall	Conference	Standing	Postseason
Oregon Ducks (Pacific-10 Conference) (1978–1983)
1978–79	Oregon	12–15	7–11	T–6th	
1979–80	Oregon	10–17	5–13	T–7th	
1980–81	Oregon	13–14	6–12	7th	
1981–82	Oregon	9–18	4–14	T–8th	
1982–83	Oregon	9–18	5–13	9th	
Oregon:		53–82	27–63		
Total:		53–82			
