= Norris Winslow =

American businessman and industrialist (1835–1900)

Norris M. Winslow
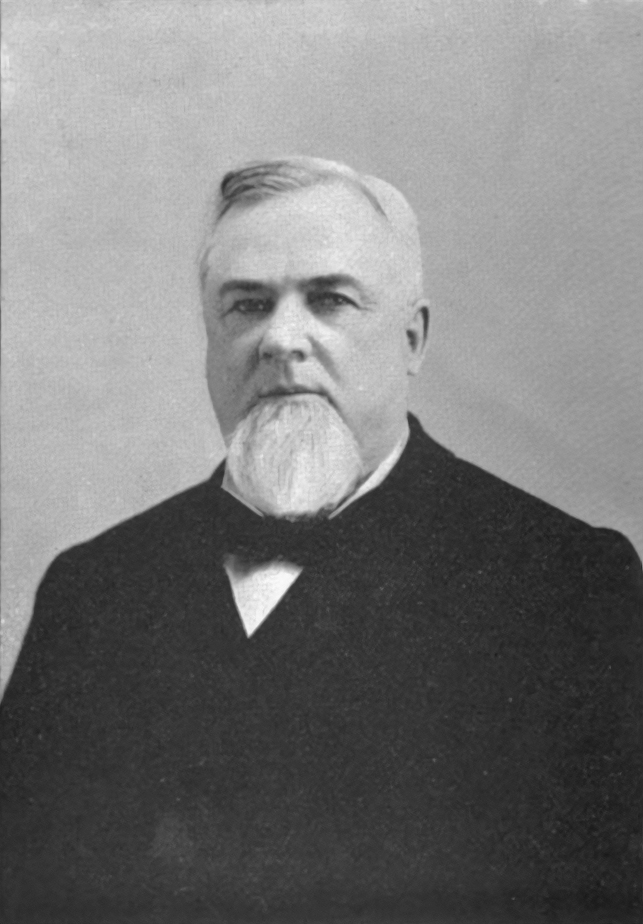
- Winslow c. 1894
- Born: May 19, 1835; Watertown, New York
- Died: May 10, 1900 (aged 64)
- Burial place: Brookside Cemetery, Watertown, New York, US
- Occupations: Banker, merchant, politician
- Title: New York State Senator of the 18th District
- Term: 1870–1873
- Political party: Republican
- Spouse: Julia Elizabeth Eddy (m. 1862)
- Children: 2
- Father: John Winslow (politician)
- Relatives: Bradley Winslow (brother)

Norris M. Winslow (May 19, 1835 – May 10, 1900) was an American banker, merchant and politician based primarily in Watertown, New York, who built almost 100 buildings in the city.

== Early life and career ==
Winslow was born on May 19, 1835, in Watertown, New York as the son of John Winslow and Betsey Collins Winslow. Winslow attended public schools in Fields Settlement, New York as a boy. He also studied at Falley Seminary and Watertown High School. He graduated in 1854, and became a clerk in a department store owned by Truman Keeler in Watertown, with a salary of $2 a week. After about two years working in the store, he purchased the stores stock and became a merchant.

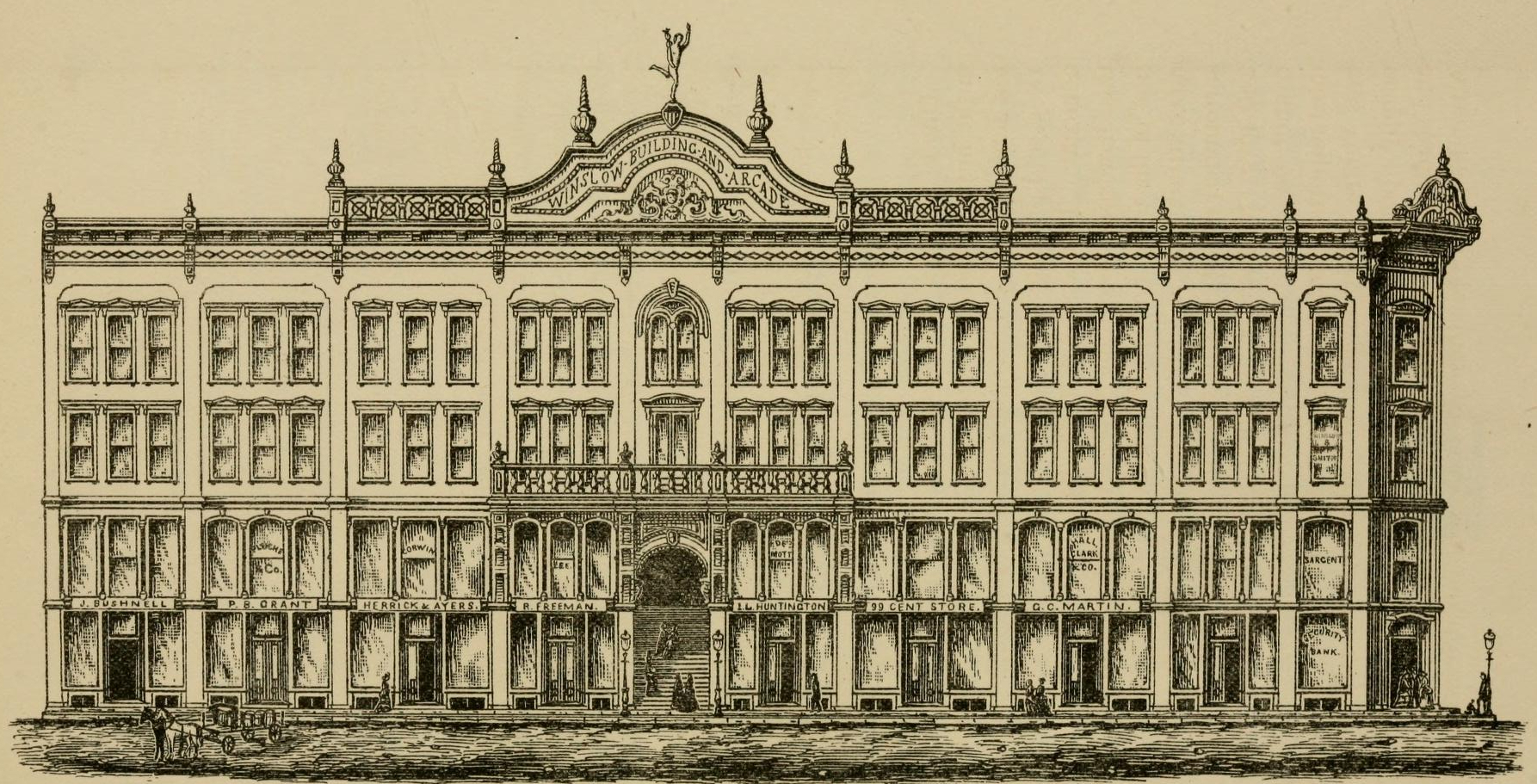
The Winslow Block in 1876

In 1866, he opened the Merchants' Bank of Watertown, which was incorporated as a stock company in April 1870, and he became CEO. In 1869, he purchased a cotton factory in Factory Square, and he began extensive improvements to the square. The Carthage, Watertown and Sackets Harbor Railroad began construction in 1872 with Winslow as a director. In 1873, he built the Winslow Block, a building in the Public Square in Watertown. The building was acquired by W. W. Taggart in 1877, and was renamed to the Taggart Block. On July 10, 1919, the building was destroyed by a fire with a loss of $300,000, equivalent to $5,571,017 in 2025. Winslow built almost 100 buildings in the southeastern portion of Watertown.

Winslow was also CEO of the Watertown Fire Insurance Company, and a shareholder of the Davis Sewing Machine Company.

Winslow was a member of the New York State Senate (18th D.) from 1870 to 1873, in the 93rd, 94th, 95th and 96th New York State Legislatures as a Republican. He was also a special agent in the U.S. Treasury Department from 1882 to 1890, but he quit because he was ill.

== Personal life and death ==
Winslow married Julia Elizabeth Eddy on April 16, 1862, having two children, Harry Eddy Winslow, who was born on June 17, 1863, and Jenny Louise Winslow, who was born on February 21, 1865.

Winslow died on May 10, 1900, and he was buried at Brookside Cemetery in Watertown, New York.

New York State Senate
Preceded by John O'Donnell	New York State Senate; 18th District; 1870–1873	Succeeded by Andrew C. Middleton
