= Alfred Winsloe =

Royal Navy Admiral; Commander in Chief, China Station (1852–1931)

Admiral Sir Alfred Winsloe KCB CMG CVO
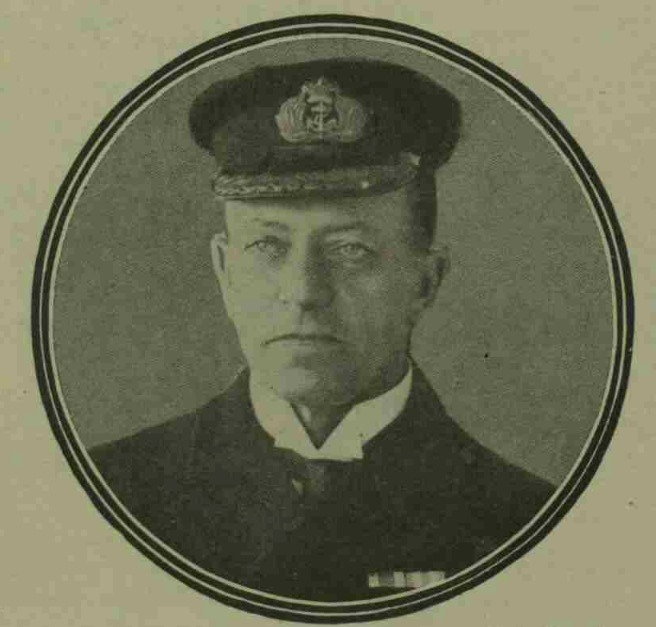
- Born: Alfred Leigh Winsloe; 25 April 1852; Pitminster, Somerset, England
- Died: 16 February 1931 (aged 78); Biarritz, France
- Military career
- Allegiance: United Kingdom
- Branch: Royal Navy
- Rank: Admiral
- Commands: Cruiser Squadron; HMS Ophir; HMS Russell; Torpedo and Submarine Craft Flotillas; China Station
- Awards: Knight Commander of the Order of the Bath; Companion of the Order of St Michael and St George; Commander of the Royal Victorian Order

Admiral Sir Alfred Leigh Winsloe, KCB, CMG, CVO (25 April 1852 – 16 February 1931) was a Royal Navy officer who went on to be Commander-in-Chief, China Station.

== Early life ==
Winsloe was born in Pitminster, Somerset, the son of Richard Winsloe and Maria Louisa Jack. He was a first cousin of Margaret Asquith, Countess of Oxford and Asquith, whose mother was Emma Winsloe, his father's younger sister.

== Naval career ==
Winsloe joined the Royal Navy in December 1865. He was promoted to commander on 30 June 1885, and to captain on 30 June 1892. From December 1898 he was in command of the new protected cruiser HMS Niobe on her first commission, as part of the Channel Squadron. He was appointed Commodore in the Cruiser Squadron in October 1900, and then commanded HMS Ophir during the Royal Tour of the Duke and Duchess of Cornwall and York (later King George V and Queen Mary) March–October 1901. When the tour had concluded, Winsloe was created a Companion of the Order of St Michael and St George (CMG) in the 1901 Birthday Honours, and a Commander of the Royal Victorian Order (CVO) in December 1901.

On his return to the Cruiser squadron in late 1901, he was posted as Commodore, 2nd class, in command of the cruiser HMS St George. Under his command, the St George took part in the fleet review at Spithead on 16 August 1902 for the coronation of King Edward VII, and in September that year was part of a squadron visiting Nauplia and Crete for combined manoeuvres in the Mediterranean Sea. He paid her off at Portsmouth on 15 November 1902. The following year, he commissioned at Chatham Dockyard on 19 February 1903 the new battleship HMS Russell for service in the Mediterranean Fleet.

Following promotion to rear-admiral on 26 November 1904, he served as Commander of the Torpedo and Submarine Craft Flotillas for two years, from 1 Februar 1905 until 1 January 1907. He went on to become Fourth Sea Lord in 1907 and Commander-in-Chief, China Station in 1910. He was appointed a Knight Commander of the Order of the Bath in the 1909 Birthday Honours. He retired in 1913.

He died in 1931.

Military offices
Preceded by Sir Frederick Inglefield	Fourth Sea Lord; 1907–1910	Succeeded by Sir Charles Madden
Preceded by Sir Hedworth Meux	Commander-in-Chief, China Station; 1910–1913	Succeeded by Sir Martyn Jerram
