= Robert E. Winslow (general) =

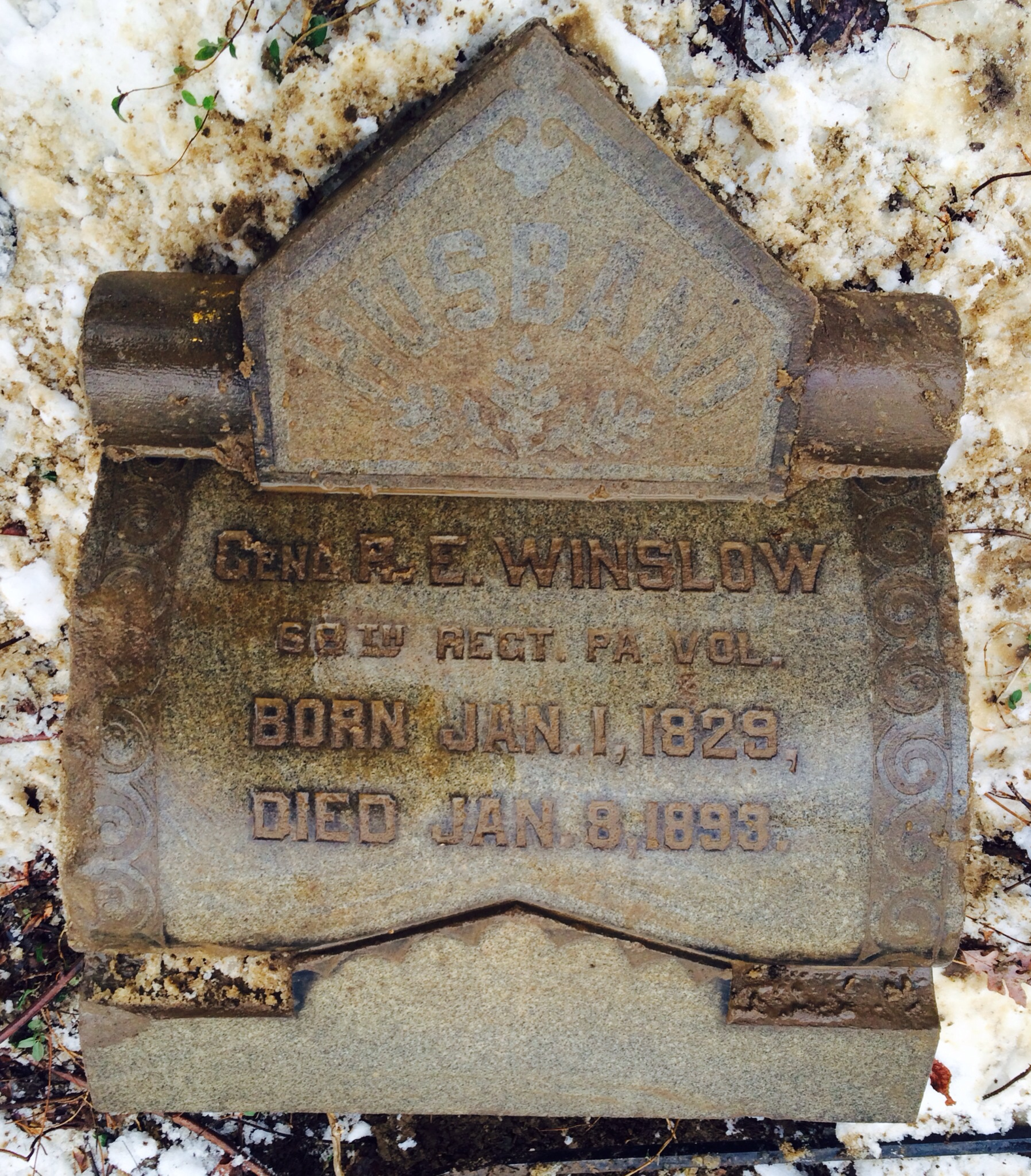
General Winslow's tombstone located in Mount Moriah Cemetery on the Yeadon, PA side.

Robert Emmet Winslow (January 1, 1829 – January 8, 1893) was a Mexican–American War veteran and a Union Army lieutenant colonel during the American Civil War. In July 1866, he was nominated and confirmed for appointment to the grade of brevet brigadier general, to rank from March 13, 1865.

During the Civil War, Winslow led the 68th Pennsylvania Volunteer Infantry for nine months in 1863 and 1864 while Colonel Andrew H. Tippen was captured. He served at the Battle of Gettysburg as a major and in the Wilderness Campaign as a lieutenant colonel.

On July 20, 1866, President Andrew Johnson nominated Winslow for appointment to the grade of brevet brigadier general of volunteers, to rank from March 13, 1865, and the United States Senate confirmed the appointment on July 26, 1866.

Upon his death in 1893, he was buried in Mount Moriah Cemetery in Yeadon, Pennsylvania.

== See also ==
- List of American Civil War brevet generals (Union)
