= Kenelm Winslow =

English pilgrim (1599–1672)

- Born: April 29, 1599; Droitwich, England
- Died: September 13, 1672 (aged 73); Salem, Massachusetts
- Burial place: Salem, Massachusetts
- Monuments: Settlers Memorial, Winslow Cemetery, Marshfield, Massachusetts
- Known for: Early immigrant to the United States
- Spouse: Eleanor Adams (married 1634–1672)
- Children: 4
- Parent: Edward Winslow (father); Magdalen Olyver (mother)

Kenelm Winslow (April 29, 1599 – September 13, 1672) was an English Pilgrim who traveled to Plymouth, Massachusetts in 1629.

== Early life and pilgrimage ==
Winslow was born on April 29, 1599, in Droitwich, England to his parents Edward and Magdalene Winslow. In 1629, he traveled to Plymouth, Massachusetts along with his brother Josiah. In 1640, he became the town surveyor of Plymouth.

== Later life ==
In 1641, he moved to Marshfield, Massachusetts. In 1653, Winslow became deputy in the Massachusetts General Court in for eight years. Kenelm was a joiner, farmer, and shipper. In 1669, he was one of the 26 owners of Assonet, Massachusetts.

== Personal life and death ==
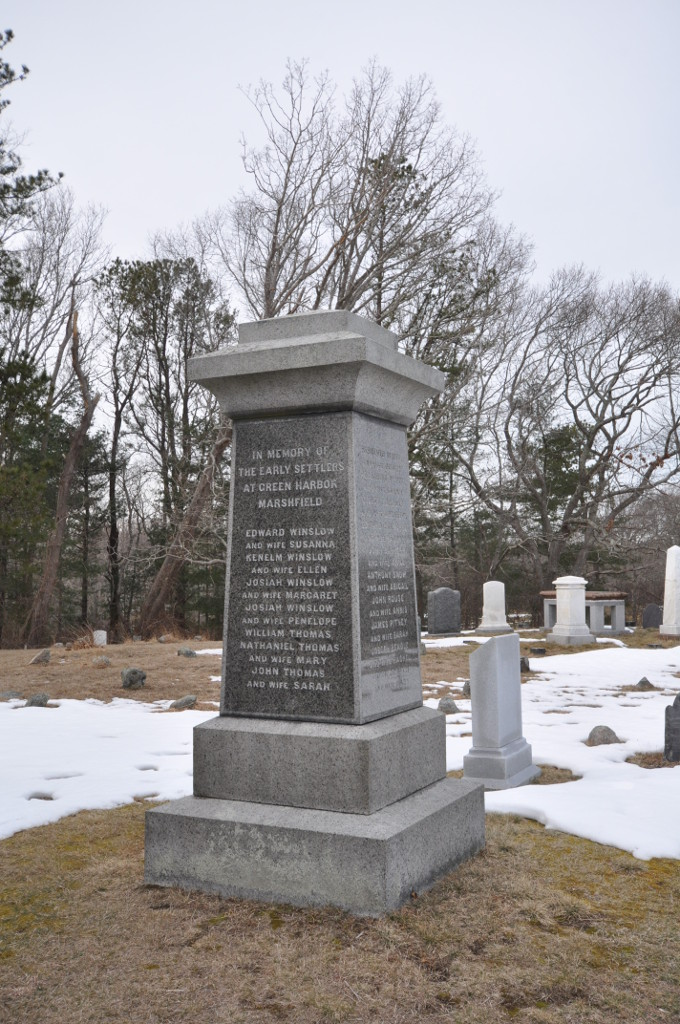
The Settlers Memorial in Winslow Cemetery, Marshfield, Massachusetts

His brother was Edward Winslow, governor of Plymouth Colony. Kenelm was married to Eleanor Adams in June 1634, and they had four children. Winslow died on September 13, 1672, in Salem, Massachusetts.

== See also ==
- Bradley Winslow, fourth great-grandson
