= Bradley Winslow =

American soldier and politician (1831–1914)

Brevet Brigadier General Bradley Winslow
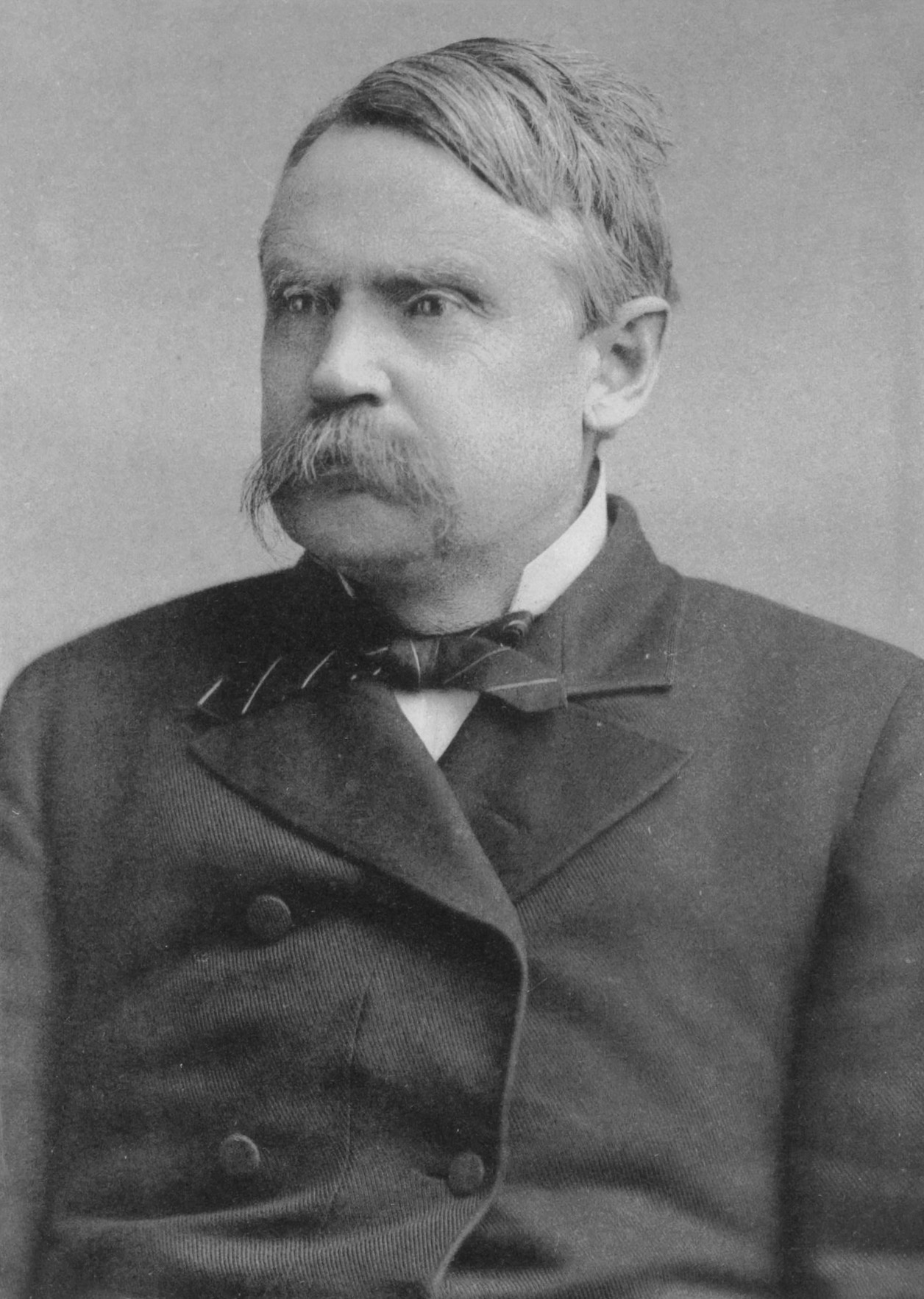
- Official portrait, 1880

Member of the New York State Senate from the 21st district
- In office 1880–1881

Personal details
- Born: August 1, 1831 Watertown, New York, US
- Died: October 24, 1914 (aged 83) Watertown, New York, US
- Resting place: Brookside Cemetery, Watertown; 43.9349°N 75.9139°W
- Party: Republican
- Spouses: Geraldine M. Cooper (m. 1855; died 1896) Poppie H. Burdick (m. 1901)
- Children: 3
- Parent: John Winslow (father)
- Relatives: Norris Winslow (brother)

Military service
- Allegiance: Union Army
- Years of service: 1861–1862; 1864–1865
- Rank: Colonel; Brevet brigadier general
- Commands: 186th New York Infantry Regiment
- Battles/wars: American Civil War; Battle of Cedar Mountain; First Battle of Rappahannock Station; Second Battle of Bull Run; Siege of Petersburg

Bradley Winslow (August 1, 1831 – October 24, 1914) was an American soldier, politician and lawyer who served as colonel of the 186th New York Regiment from 1864 to 1865 during the American Civil War. Winslow was also a member of the New York State Senate in 1880, and mayor of Watertown, New York, in 1875.

Winslow studied at various seminaries and colleges, and began studying to become a lawyer in 1853. He worked in various law firms until being elected district attorney of Jefferson County, New York in 1859. At the break of the civil war, he resigned as district attorney and volunteered in the Union Army. He fought in the Northern Virginia campaign in 1862 as a lieutenant colonel, and was promoted to colonel in September 1864. During his time as colonel, he assisted the Union Army in capturing forts during the Siege of Petersburg, and was discharged in June 1865 after suffering a gunshot wound. Winslow was brevetted brigadier general by president Abraham Lincoln on April 9, 1865, for "brave and gallant conduct" during the siege. After the war, he returned to politics, being re-elected as district attorney in 1865 and serving as a delegate and chairperson in the 1908 Republican National Convention.

== Childhood and early career ==
Winslow's ancestors were English pioneers. One such ancestor was his fourth great-grandfather Kenelm Winslow, a pilgrim who traveled to Plymouth, Massachusetts, in 1629.

Bradley Winslow was born on August 1, 1831, on the farm of his parents John Winslow and Elizabeth Winslow née Collins in the town of Watertown, New York ≈ 2.75 miles away from the city of Watertown. Bradley had five siblings, including his brother Norris Winslow. Bradley Winslow attended schools in the Watertown City School District as a boy. His mother died when he was 14 years old, and on March 21, 1847, he began living with his uncle, Willard Ives. Winslow began attending Cazenovia College c. December 1, 1847, and in 1850 and 1851, he studied at Falley Seminary. From 1852 to 1853, he studied at Wyoming Seminary in Pennsylvania.

Winslow began to study law in the office of James F. Starbuck in the fall of 1853. In 1854 he began attending Poughkeepsie Law School. Winslow was admitted to the bar in July 1855. Winslow was taught by Starbuck in his first year as a lawyer, and opened a law firm on January 1, 1856. In the spring of 1856, Lafayette Bigelow joined the firm, and the firm was renamed Winslow & Bigelow. In 1859, he was elected district attorney of Jefferson County, New York, taking office on January 1, 1860 and serving until 1861.

== Military career ==
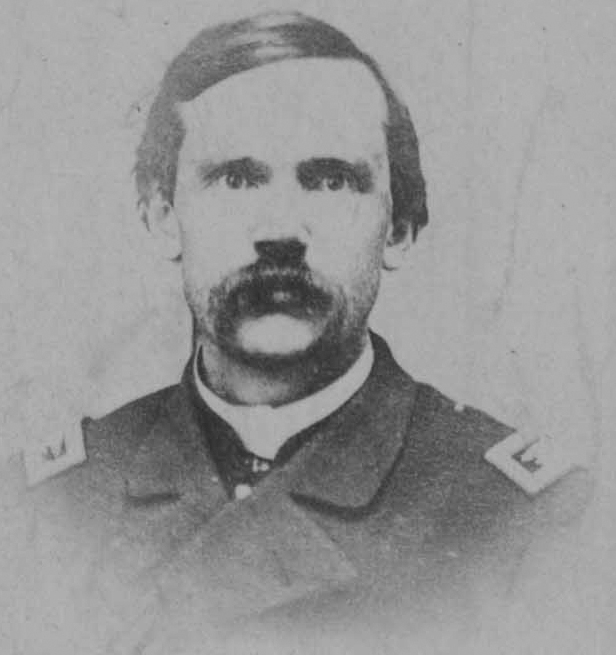
Winslow during his time as Brigadier General of US Volunteers in 1865

Upon the outbreak of the American Civil War, Winslow resigned as district attorney and volunteered to become a First lieutenant in the Black River Corps, a militia unit in Watertown, on May 13, 1861. He was mustered in to Company A of the 35th New York Infantry Regiment on June 11, 1861, as captain. He was promoted to lieutenant colonel on August 31, 1861.

In August 1862, Winslow fought in the Northern Virginia campaign, and assisted General Nathaniel P. Banks during the enemy retreat in the Battle of Cedar Mountain, as well as commanding his regiment in the First Battle of Rappahannock Station. From August 28 to 30, 1862, he fought in the Second Battle of Bull Run. While fighting in the Northern Virginia campaign, Winslow contracted typhoid fever, and he resigned from the Union Army on December 18, 1862, and received an honorable discharge. In 1864, president Abraham Lincoln called for 500,000 men to join the Union Army, and Winslow rejoined the army on August 22, 1864. He was mustered in as the colonel of the 186th New York Infantry Regiment on September 28, 1864.

=== Attack on Fort Mahone ===
After the Battle of Five Forks on April 1, 1865, General Ulysses S. Grant commanded the Union Army to attack Petersburg, Virginia.

The day afterwards, on April 2, 1865, the Union Army attacked Petersburg. General Simon Goodell Griffin commanded six of his regiments to stand in a column at around 2 am, with one regiment standing in front of the other. His plan was to have all of his regiments attack Battery 28, a fort between Fort Heaven and Fort Mahone, and eventually one of the regiments would breach the fort. The 186th New York Regiment was the very last in the column, with the 56th Massachusetts Infantry Regiment in reserve. Winslow later remembered that while getting ready to capture the fort, he heard "Screaming, hissing shot and shell, interspersed with the sharp whiz and ping of leaden bullets, seemed passing everywhere above our heads".

At ≈4:00 a.m., the attack started with the signal "Four o' clock and all is well". The front regiments all retreated, until the 186th regiment was the last regiment remaining. The 186th New York Regiment quickly captured Battery 28. The Confederate Army still maintained a secondary line and still held Fort Mahone, and they shot at Winslow and his regiment. He was shot below between his lower right ribs by a Minié ball, which passed through his body and came out on the left side near his spine.

Winslow was recommended promotion to brevet Brigadier general of US Volunteers by general Simon Goodell Griffin for "brave and gallant conduct" during the Siege of Petersburg. On April 9, 1865, Winslow was promoted by president Abraham Lincoln with permission from the US Senate. He was discharged from the army on June 2, 1865, and was appointed to lieutenant in the 22nd United States Infantry, but left the army instead and returned to Watertown, becoming a lawyer again. On June 13, 1865, general Griffin sent a letter to Winslow thanking him for gallantry during the siege.

My dear colonel, It is with sincere pleasure that I inform you that I have recommended your promotion to the rank of Brigadier General by brevet for bravery and gallant conduct on the field at the assault on the enemy's lines in front of Petersburg, April 2, 1865 [...] I am very happy, Colonel, to make this acknowledgment of your meritorious services as commander of your regiment, and of the gallant and judicious manner in which you handled your regiment in my presence during the engagement of the 2d of April, an engagement that will be forever memorable in our nation's history. With sincere esteem, I have the honor to be yours, etc.,

— S. G. Griffin

== Later career ==
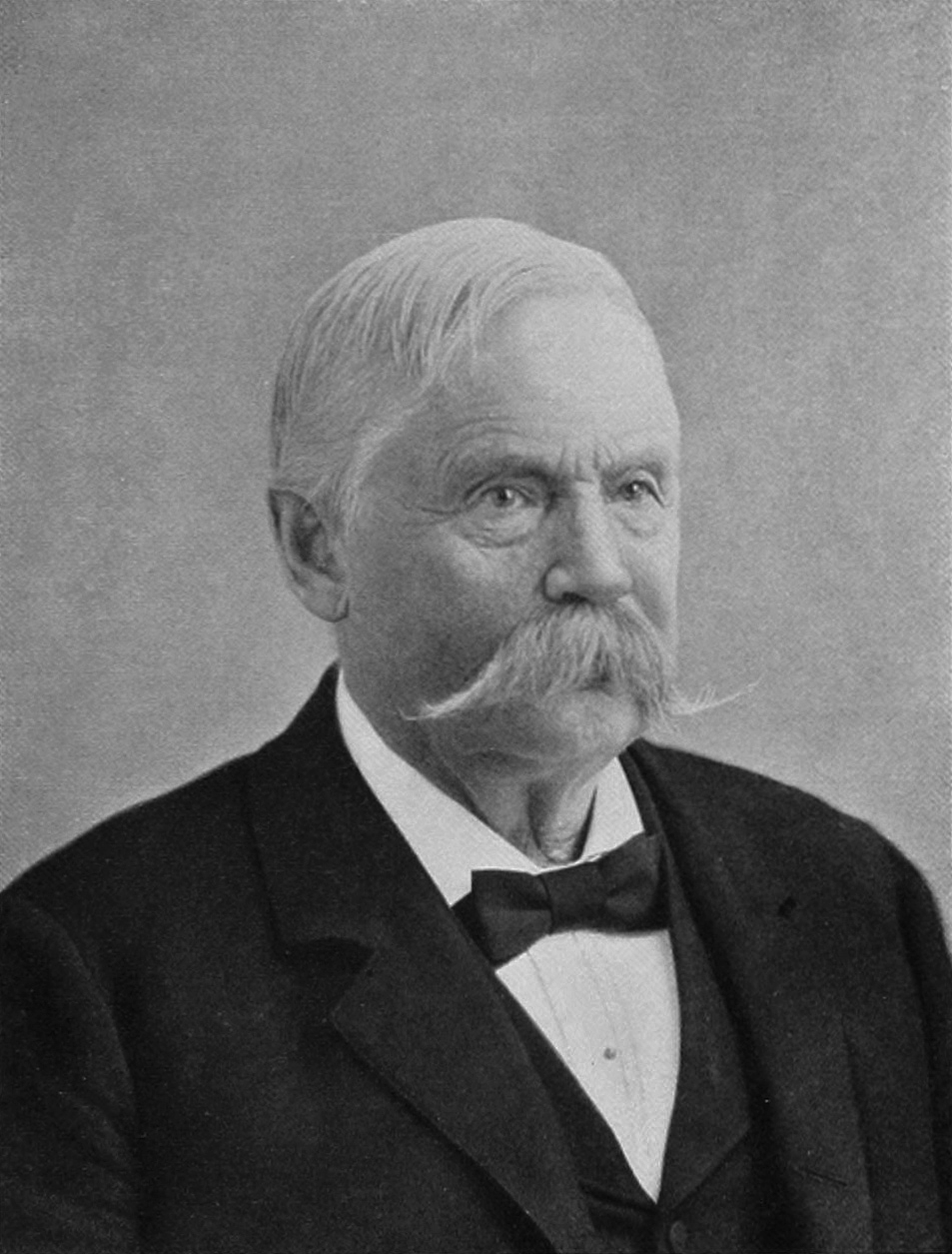
Winslow in 1898

In 1865, Winslow was elected district attorney of Jefferson County again until 1868. He was appointed as brigadier general of the National Guard as the head of the 16th Brigade for about six years. Winslow was elected as mayor of the city of Watertown in December 1875 for one term, and chose not to be re-elected. He was a member of the 21st District of the New York State Senate in 1880 and 1881 as a Republican.

From 1883 to 1884, he managed the newspaper Northern New York Republican until it was merged with the Watertown Post. In June 1908, Winslow was a delegate in the 1908 Republican National Convention to nominate a candidate for member of the 28th congressional district of the United States Congress, being the unanimous vote to be the chairperson. In December 1912, Luther Wright Mott proposed a private bill to officially retire Winslow. He was to be paid $3,000 a year, equivalent to $72,325 in 2025.

== Personal life and death ==
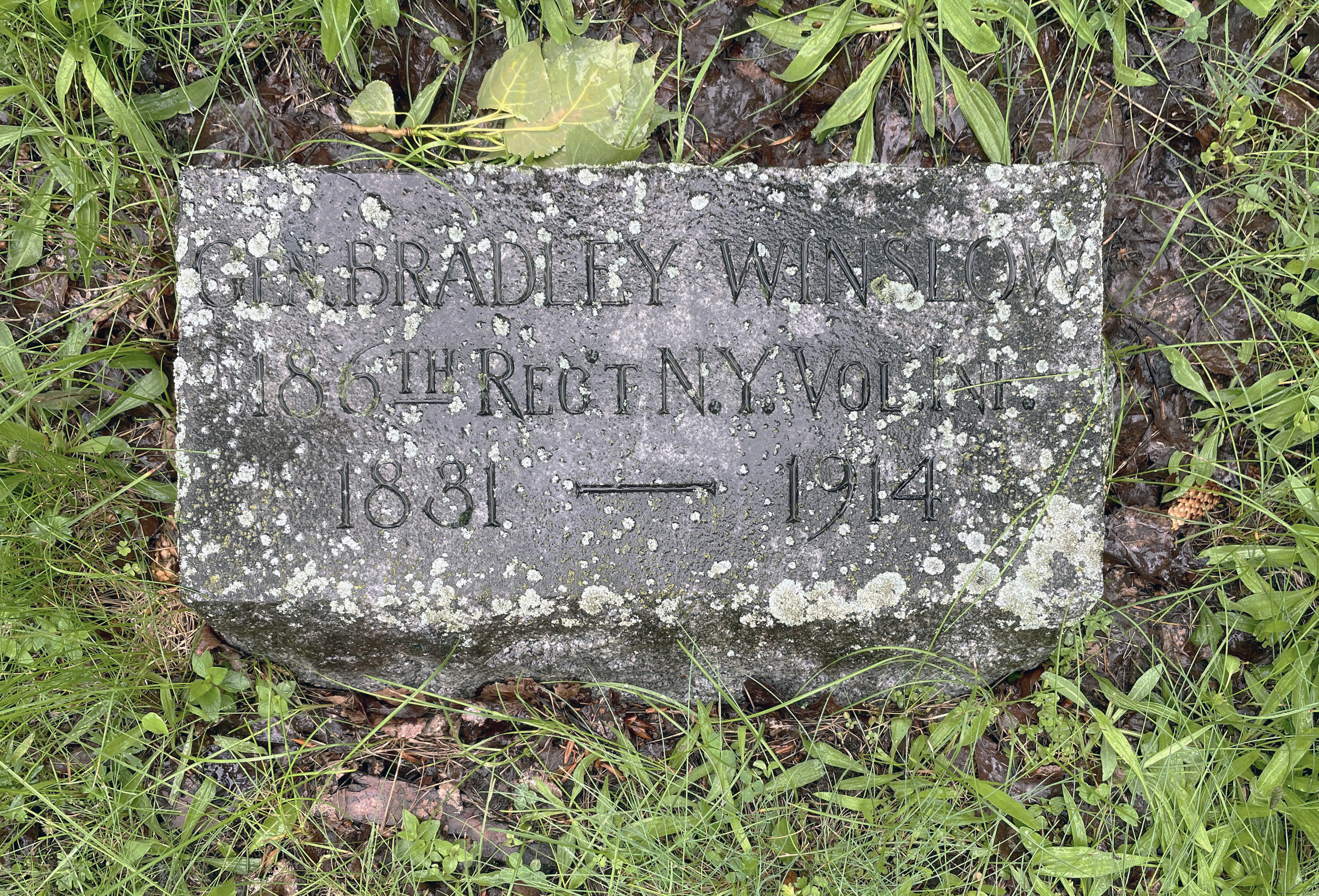
Winslow's gravestone in Brookside Cemetery, Watertown, New York

Winslow married Geraldine M. Cooper on November 15, 1855, and they had three children; a boy and two girls. His son, John Cooper Winslow, was born on October 22, 1856, in Watertown. Geraldine died on August 24, 1896, after accidentally being thrown out of a carriage. Winslow re-married to Poppie H. Burdick on January 22, 1901, in Cook County, Illinois.

Winslow died on October 24, 1914, at 2:30 pm in the city hospital of Watertown after suffering from pneumonia for only a few days. He was buried at Brookside Cemetery in Watertown, New York. He was a member of the Grand Army of the Republic until his death, and he helped start the Joe Spratt Post Number 323 in Watertown.

New York State Senate
Preceded by John W. Lippitt	New York State Senate; 21st District; 1880–1881	Succeeded by Frederick Lansing
