= Walter C. Winslow =

American judge

Walter Clarence Winslow
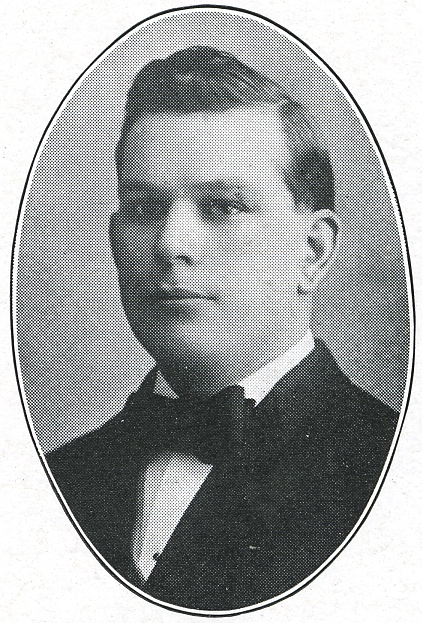
- Winslow in 1910

Justice pro tempore of the Oregon Supreme Court
- In office 1947–1948
- Preceded by: James T. Brand
- Succeeded by: James T. Brand

Personal details
- Born: October 29, 1882 Polk County, Oregon
- Died: May 23, 1962 (aged 79) Salem, Oregon
- Party: Republican
- Spouse: Lottie Deyoe

Walter Clarence Winslow (October 29, 1882 – May 23, 1962) was an American attorney in Oregon. A native of the state, he practiced law in Salem and later served temporarily on the Oregon Supreme Court. In legal practice he worked for brothers John Hugh McNary and Charles L. McNary in his early years as a lawyer.

== Early life ==
Walter Winslow was born in Polk County, Oregon, to Paris R. and Addie Wilson (née Vandevort) on October 29, 1882. Raised on the family farm in the Brush College area to the northwest of Salem, he received his primary education in the local public schools there and in the preparatory department at Willamette University in Salem. Winslow then attended college at the University of Oregon in Eugene where he graduated in 1906 with a bachelor of arts degree. In 1908, he graduated from Willamette University College of Law with a bachelor of laws degree.

== Legal career ==
Winslow passed the bar in June 1908 in Salem and joined John H. and Charles L. McNary in legal practice in Salem. In October of the following year the Republican became a deputy district attorney in Marion County. In 1947, Oregon Supreme Court justice James T. Brand temporarily left the court to serve as a judge at the Subsequent Nuremberg Trials in Germany following World War II. Winslow was appointed on a temporary basis as a judge pro tem to serve on the court in Brand's absence. He returned to private legal practice in Salem after Brand returned to the court in 1948.

== Family and later life ==
Winslow married Lottie Deyoe (died 1961) in 1910 and had three children; Gertrude, Norman, and Genevieve. During World War I he served on the draft board. The family purchased the Bligh Building (now Pacific Building) in downtown Salem in 1945 and retained ownership until 1976. In civic affairs he served as secretary and director for the Salem Business Men's League, was the director of the Salem YMCA, and was also a leader at the Salem First United Methodist Church. He also was a member of the Masons. Walter C. Winslow died on May 23, 1962, of a heart attack while fishing near Sweet Home. His body was found the next day in the water and buried at City View Cemetery in Salem.
