= Lo Esencial (Dark Latin Groove album) =

Greatest hits album by DLG (Dark Latin Groove)
- Released: December 7, 2004
- Recorded: 1996–1999
- Genre: Salsa; latin pop; reggae; bachata; hip hop
- Length: 67:45
- Language: Spanish; English
- Label: Legacy; Columbia
- Producer: Sergio George; Various

DLG (Dark Latin Groove) chronology
Serie Azul Tropical (2003)	Lo Esencial (2004)	20 Éxitos Originales (2005)

Lo Esencial (transl. "The Essential") is the fourth greatest hits album by the American salsa band Dark Latin Groove. It was released on December 7, 2004 through Legacy Recordings, Sony BMG and Sony Music Latin. Part of the Lo Esencial compilation album series, it contains songs from his first studio album Dark Latin Groove released in 1996 by Sony Discos to his third studio album entitled Gotcha! released in 1999 on Columbia Records.

It contains hits like "Volveré", "La Quiero A Morir", "No Morirá", "Juliana", "Que Locura Enamorarme de Ti", among others.

== Background ==
The album contains in its essence the 3 DLG albums, the style of salsa reggae from the DLG album, Swing On! and Gotcha!. Which were the creativity of producer Sergio George the voice of their lead singer Huey Dunbar, the rough rap of James Da Barba, the freestyle and soft rap of Fragrancia.

== Repertoire and recordings ==
Lo Esencial DLG It contains fifteen songs, most of them covers of merengue, latin pop, pop, reggae and hip hop songs, adapting them to salsa. Four of them co-written by George, and the other eleven written and performed by other singers such as "No Morirá" written by Anne Godwin, Larry Lange and adapted into Spanish by Rodolfo Castillo and Jorge Luís Piloto being this last winner of the award in the tropical category of the American Society of Composers, Authors and Publishers in 1997.

== Track listing ==
All tracks are written by Sergio George, except where noted.

Lo Esencial DLG Track listing
No.	Title	Writer(s)	Producer(s)	Length
1.	"La Quiero A Morir"	Francis Cabrel; Luis Gómez-Escolar	Sergio George	5:00
2.	"Juliana"	Cuco Valoy	Sergio George	4:58
3.	"Volveré"	Paco Cepero; Ignacio Román	Sergio George	4:51
4.	"Que Locura Enamorarme de Ti" (performed by Huey Dunbar and Eddie Santiago)	Alejandro M. Vezanni	Sergio George	4:57
5.	"Muévete"	Luis Daniel Cabarcas; Sergio George	Sergio George	4:36
6.	"A Veces Me Pregunto"	Guadalupe "Lupillo" García; Sergio George	Sergio George	4:31
7.	"No Morirá (No Matter What)"	Rodolfo Castillo; Anne Godwin; Larry Lange; Jorge Luís Piloto	Leotis Clyburm; Sergio George	4:31
8.	"Me Va Extrañar (Unchained My Heart)"	Vlady Tosetto; Ricardo Montaner	Leotis Clyburm; Sergio George; George Zamora	4:41
9.	"Magdalena, Mi Amor (Químbara)" (duet with Ivy Queen)	Junior Cepeda; Sergio George	Sergio George	4:18
10.	"Todo Mí Corazón"	Ilan Chester	Sergio George	4:59
11.	"Acucuye"	Johnny Pacheco	Johnny Pacheco; Sergio George	4:53
12.	"Gotcha!"	Manny Benito; Sergio George	David Sanchez; Sergio George; Boogie Lou	5:12
13.	"Prisionero"	Yoel Henríquez	Sergio George	4:51
14.	"La Solédad"	J. Badía; Ángelo Valsiglio; Cavalli; Cremones	Sergio George	5:04
Total length:				67:45

== Personnel ==
=== Technicals ===
- J. Badía - Composer
- Manny Bentito - Composer
- Luis Daniel Cabarcas - Composer
- Francis Cabrel - Composer
- Luis Gómez-Escolar - Composer
- Rodolfo Castillo - Composer
- Junior Cepeda - Composer
- Paco Cepero - Composer
- Ilan Chester - Composer
- Guadalupe "Lupillo" García - Composer
- Sergio George - Arranger, Producer, Audio Production, Mixing, Engineer, Composer
- Anne Godwin - Composer
- Yoel Henríquez - Composer
- Larry Lange - Composer
- Johnny Pacheco - Composer, Producer, Performer, Mixing, Flute, Primary Artist
- Jorge Luís Piloto - Composer
- Cuco Valoy - Composer
- Ángelo Valsiglio - Composer
- Ricardo Montaner - Composer
- Vlady Tosetto - Composer
- Leotis Clyburm - Arranger, Producer, Mixing Engineer
- George Zamora - Producer
- Boogie Lou - Producer, Mixing
- David Sanchez - Producer

=== Performers ===
- DLG (Dark Latin Groove) - Performers, Primary Artist Band
- Huey Dunbar - Primary Artist, Performer
- Eddie Santiago - Performer
