= Renacer (Dark Latin Groove album) =

Studio album by DLG (Dark Latin Groove)
- Released: April 15, 2007
- Genre: Salsa, Reggae
- Length: 40:15
- Label: La Calle Records

DLG (Dark Latin Groove) chronology
| Gotcha! (1999) | Renacer (2007) | TBA |

Singles from Renacer
- 1. "Quiero Decirte Que Te Amo" Released: 2007

Renacer is DLG's first album after their breakup with previous lead singer Huey Dunbar. The album features Yahaira Vargas, otherwise known as Miss YaYa, as the new lead singer. The album received a Grammy nomination for "Best Tropical Latin Album.

== Features ==
Renacer features long time group contributor Fragancia along with an invited guest singer Ness and Rapper/Singer/DJ, DJ Napoles(Napo). DLG released a new hit via radio in February 2008 called "Quiero decirte que te amo" which is a remake of Italian ballad of Laura Pausini, and also a Peruvian folk song cover called "Toro mata" (The Bull Kills). Also included is the remake of the ballad that was now done Salsa style of "Pero me acuerdo de ti", which was done by Christina Aguilera and was featured on her album "Mi Reflejo", which was written by songwriter Rudy Pérez. Sergio George had also included on the album of live performances of Miss Ya Ya and group doing the hit songs, "No morirá", "Volveré", "Muévete" and "Juliana".

== Track listing ==
1. Quiero decirte que te amo
2. Toro mata
3. Pero me acuerdo de ti
4. Conmigo quédate
5. El sueño se acabó (Tal vez)
6. No soy esa mujer
7. No morirá
8. Muévete
9. Volveré
10. La quiero a morir
11. Juliana

== Chart position ==
| Year | Chart | Peak |
|---|---|---|
| 2008 | Billboard Top Latin Albums | 47 |
| 2008 | Billboard Latin Tropical Albums | 4 |
