= Yo Si Me Enamoré =

Studio album by Huey Dunbar
- Released: February 27, 2001
- Recorded: November 1999 – January 2001 at: EQ's Recording Studio, Miami, FL; Indre Studios, Philadelphia, PA; Live Action Studios, Miami, FL; Musica Futura, Miami, FL; RPM Studios, New York, NY; Sony Music Studios, Mexico; The War Room, NJ
- Genre: Salsa; bolero; Latin pop; tropical
- Length: 46:27
- Language: Spanish; English
- Label: Sony Discos
- Producer: Omar Alfanno; Kike Santander; Alejandro Jaén; Sergio George

Huey Dunbar chronology
Yo Si Me Enamoré (2001)	Music for My Peoples (2003)

Singles from Yo Si Me Enamoré
- 1. "Yo Si Me Enamoré (Bolero Version)" Released: January 15, 2001; 2. "Con Cada Beso (Balada Version)" Released: June 4, 2001; 3. "¿A Cambio de Qué? (Salsa Version)" Released: September 3, 2001; 4. "Ella (Pop Version)" Released: November 5, 2001

Yo Si Me Enamoré (transl. "I Did Fall in Love") is the debut studio album by American salsa recording artist Huey Dunbar. Released on February 27, 2001, through Sony Discos, the album was produced by Omar Alfanno and co-produced by Alejandro Jaén, Sergio George and Kike Santander. It contains 11 songs and 4 singles in bolero, salsa and Latin pop versions.

It includes a duet with the Mexican actress and singer Lucero in the song "Lo Siento" in its Balada version. The first single "Yo Si Me Enamoré" in its bolero version was nominated for a Latin Grammy for Best Tropical Song at the 2nd Annual Latin Grammy Awards on October 30, 2001.

== Background ==
A few months after Dunbar's departure from the American salsa band Dark Latin Groove following their third studio album Gotcha! released in 1999, Sergio George suggested he start recording his debut album.

== Critical reception ==
Evan C. Gutiérrez of AllMusic said, "Together with some other New York talent, the two formed the genre-crossing tropical group DLG, and in a matter of a few short years, cranked out three fantastic albums that went a long way towards turning Dunbar into salsa's up and coming bad boy. For Dunbar, going solo was a natural next step."

== Track listing ==
All tracks are written by Alejandro Jaén, except where noted.

Yo Si Me Enamoré track listing
No.	Title	Writer(s)	Producer(s)	Length
1.	"Yo Si Me Enamoré (Bolero Version)"	Alejandro Jaén; William Paz	Alejandro Jaén	4:05
2.	"Con Cada Beso (Balada Version)"	Fernando Osorio; Andrew Thomas	Sergio George; Jimmy Greco; Ray Contreras	4:00
3.	"Lo Siento (Salsa Version)"	Gustavo Márquez	Jaén; Sergio George; Contreras; Greco; Omar Alfanno	4:14
4.	"¿A Cambio de Qué? (Salsa Version)"	Javier Santos	Sergio George; Contreras; Greco; Alfanno	4:23
5.	"Ella (Pop Version)"	José Alfredo Jiménez; Kike Santander	Sergio George; Contreras; Greco; Santander	4:19
6.	"Lo Siento (Balada Version)" (featuring Lucero)	Gustavo Márquez	Sergio George; Santander; Alfanno; Jaén	4:20
7.	"Chikika"	Ray Contreras; Guadalupe "Lupillo" García; Sergio George; Jimmy Greco	Sergio George; Contreras; Greco; Santander; Alfanno	3:54
8.	"Amor de Siempre"	Omar Alfanno	Sergio George; Contreras; Greco; Alfanno	4:35
9.	"Con Cada Beso (Salsa Version)"	Fernando Osorio; Andrew Thomas	Sergio George; Santander; Alfanno; Jaén	4:11
10.	"Yo Necesito un Milagro"	Jaén	Sergio George; Contreras; Greco; Jaén; Alfanno; Santander	4:44

=== Especial bonus track ===
Bonus track
No.	Title	Writer(s)	Producer(s)	Length
1.	"Yo Si Me Enamoré (Son Version)"	Alejandro Jaén; William Paz	Alejandro Jaén	3:42
Total length:				46:27

== Charts ==
Chart (2001)	Peak position
US Top Latin Albums (Billboard)	14
US Tropical Albums (Billboard)	1

== Sales and certifications ==
Region	Certification	Certified units/sales
United States (RIAA)	Platinum (Latin)	100,000^{^}
^{^} Shipments figures based on certification alone.
