= Bad of the Heart =

Bad of the Heart may refer to:

- Bad of the Heart (album), an album by George Lamond
- "Bad of the Heart" (song), a song from the album
