= USS Kearsarge (BB-5) =

Kearsarge-class pre-dreadnought battleship

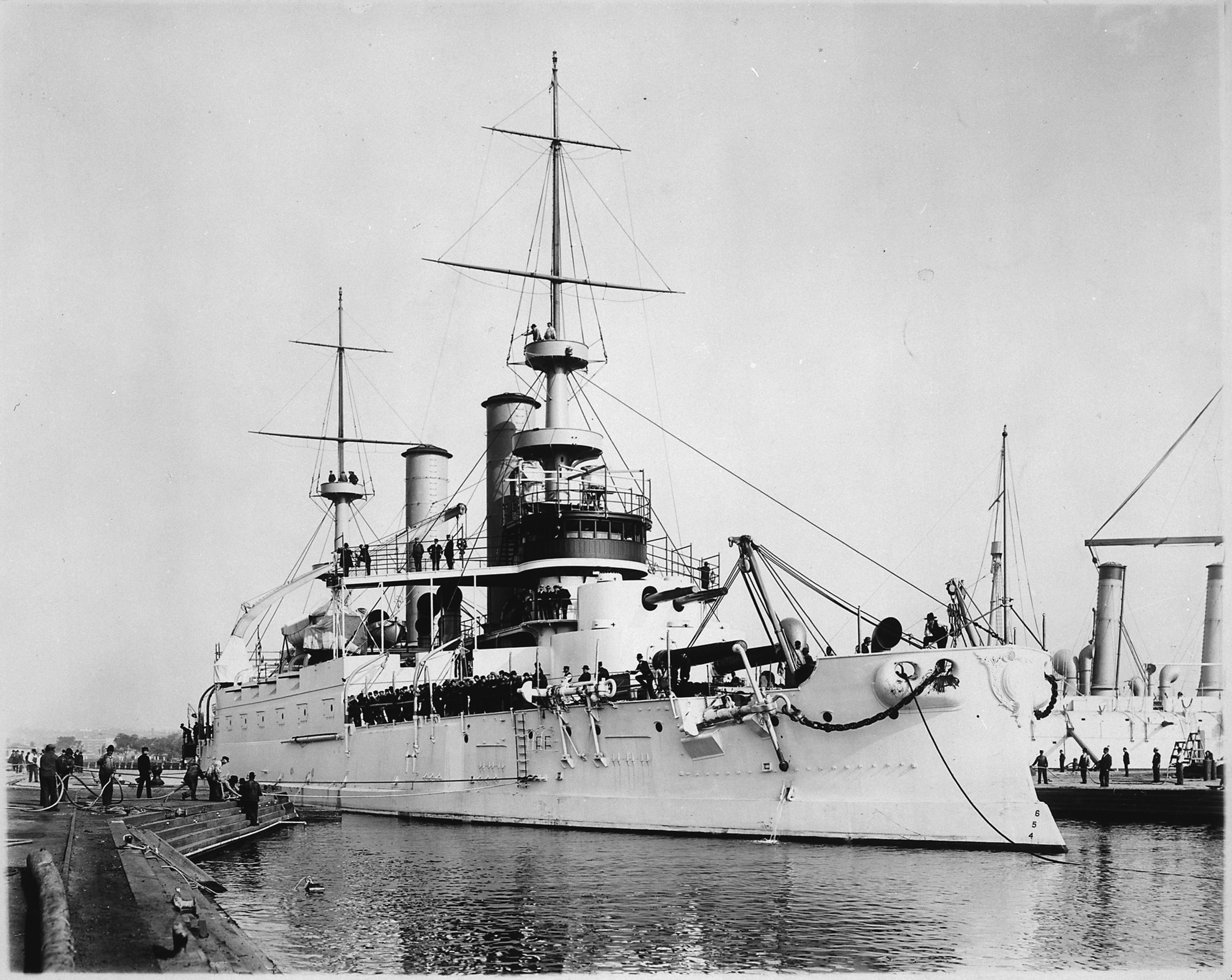
- Kearsarge in 1899

History

United States
- Name: Kearsarge
- Namesake: USS Kearsarge
- Ordered: 2 March 1895
- Awarded: 2 January 1896
- Builder: Newport News SB&DD
- Laid down: 30 June 1896
- Launched: 24 March 1898
- Commissioned: 20 February 1900
- Decommissioned: 4 September 1909
- Recommissioned: 23 June 1915
- Decommissioned: 10 or 18 May 1920
- Renamed: Crane Ship No. 1, 6 November 1941 (Note: From the time of its conversion to a crane ship, the classification and naming of Kearsarge is highly problematic. The Dictionary of American Naval Fighting Ships mentions that Kearsarge was reclassified as AB-1 on 5 August 1920, and that it was renamed to Crane Ship No. 1 on 6 November 1941. This is repeated by a number of other sources. However, the symbol AB was not used in 1920: Roberts claims the symbol was created in 1931, while Reilly and Scheina claim it was established even later, in 1939. According to Reilly and Scheina, on 5 August 1920 Kearsarge (BB-5) became Kearsarge (Crane Ship No. 1), with the "Crane Ship" serving instead of a different designation, and on 15 April 1939, when the AB designation was adopted, she became Kearsarge (AB-1). In 1941, when the name Kearsarge was wanted for other ships, she was renamed, and she became Crane Ship No. 1 (AB-1). The IX-16 classification is also uncertain. Bauer and Roberts report that Kearsarge was reclassified as IX-16 on 17 July 1920, before being classified AB-1 on 15 April 1939, although Roberts also claims that the designation IX-16 may have been used for USS Tallahassee (BM-9) between 1921 and 1922, and that this was before it was used for Kearsarge. However, a number of other sources also mention Kearsarge being designated IX-16.)
- Reclassified: IX-16, 17 July 1920; AB-1, 5 August 1920
- Stricken: 22 June 1955
- Fate: Sold for scrap, 9 August 1955

General characteristics
- Class & type: Kearsarge-class pre-dreadnought battleship
- Displacement: 11,540 long tons (11,730 t)
- Length: 375 ft 4 in (114.40 m)
- Beam: 72 ft 3 in (22.02 m)
- Draft: 23 ft 6 in (7.16 m)
- Installed power: 5 Scotch marine boilers; 10,000 ihp (7,500 kW)
- Propulsion: 2 propeller shafts; 2 triple-expansion steam engines
- Speed: 16 knots (30 km/h; 18 mph)
- Range: 5,316 nmi (9,845 km; 6,118 mi) at 10 knots (19 km/h; 12 mph)
- Complement: 40 officers and 514 enlisted men
- Armament: 4 × 13"/35 caliber gun (330 mm); 4 × 8"/35 caliber gun (203 mm); 14 × 5"/40 caliber gun (127 mm); 20 × 6-pounders (2.2 in or 57 mm); 8 × 1-pounders (1.5 in or 37 mm); 4 × .30 in (7.62 mm) machine guns; 4 × 18 in (457 mm) torpedo tubes
- Armor: Belt: 4–16.5 in (102–419 mm); Barbettes: 12.5–15 in (318–381 mm); Turrets (primary): 15–17 in (381–432 mm); Turrets (secondary): 6–11 in (152–279 mm); Conning tower: 10 in (254 mm)

USS Kearsarge (hull number: BB-5), (Note: The hull classification symbol BB was adopted in 1920, the same year that Kearsarge would be converted to a crane ship. The correct hull code would have been B-5; the newer prefix is used for consistency with other ships.) was the name ship of the Kearsarge class of pre-dreadnought battleships built during the 1890s for the United States Navy. Instead of being named after a state, she was named in honor of the Civil War-era Kearsarge, a sloop-of-war that sank CSS Alabama in the Battle of Cherbourg, being the only United States Navy battleship to deviate from the established naming conventions.

Completed in 1900, Kearsarge initially served as the flagship of the North Atlantic Squadron until 1905 and from 1907 to 1909 she sailed as part of the Great White Fleet that circumnavigated the world. In 1909 she was decommissioned for modernization, which was finished in 1911. In 1915 she served in the Atlantic, and between 1916 and 1919 she served as a training ship. She was converted into a crane ship in 1920, renamed Crane Ship No. 1 in 1941, and sold for scrap in 1955.

== Design ==
The Kearsarge-class battleships were designed to be used for coastal defense. They had a normal displacement of 11,540 long tons (11,730 t), an overall length of 375 feet 4 inches (114.4 m), a beam of 72 feet 3 inches (22.02 m) and a draft of 23 feet 6 inches (7.16 m). The three-cylinder vertical triple-expansion steam engines each drove one propeller shaft using steam provided by five Scotch marine boilers. The engines were designed to produce 10,000 indicated horsepower (7,500 kW) and give the ship a speed of 16 knots (30 km/h; 18 mph), but Kearsarge's engines produced a total of 11,674 ihp (8,705 kW) and gave a maximum speed of 16.8 knots (31.1 km/h; 19.3 mph) during the ship's sea trials. She normally carried 410 long tons (420 t) of coal, but could carry a maximum of 1,591 long tons (1,617 t) which gave her a range of 5,316 nautical miles (9,845 km; 6,118 mi) at a speed of 10 knots (19 km/h; 12 mph). The ship was manned by 40 officers and 514 enlisted men, a total of 554 crewmen.

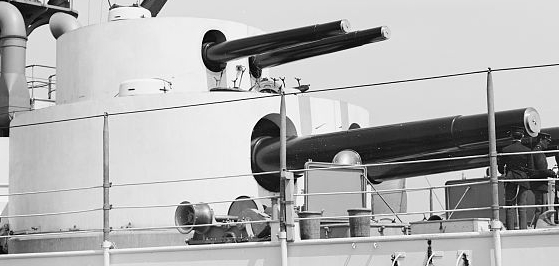
Kearsarge's double turret on 8 April 1900

Kearsarges had two twin-gun turrets, each with two 330 mm/ 35-caliber guns and two 8"/35 caliber guns (203 mm), stacked in two levels. Their secondary battery consisted of fourteen quick-firing 5"/40 caliber guns (127 mm) on single casemate mounts on the main deck, seven on each broadside. Anti-torpedo boat defense was provided by twenty 6-pounder (57 mm or 2.2 in) guns, eight of which were positioned in casemates on the berthing deck in the hull. The remaining guns were located above the 5-inch guns in single pivot mounts as were four Hotchkiss 1-pounder (37 mm or 1.5 in) guns. Two 1-pounder guns from Maxim-Nordenfelt were mounted in each of the lower fighting tops on the military masts, and two .30 in (7.62 mm) machine guns were in each of the upper fighting tops. Four 18 in (457 mm) torpedo tubes were located on the berthing deck in rotating mounts. Kearsarge had a very low freeboard, which resulted in her guns becoming unusable in bad weather. At some point during 1906 the number of 6-pounder guns was reduced to 12, all of the 1-pounder guns were removed as were her torpedo tubes. Two years later six Hotchkiss 1-pounder guns were re-installed and the machine guns were removed.

The armor of the Kearsarge class was made of harveyized steel. The waterline armor belt was 16.5 inches (419 mm) thick covering the propulsion machinery and uniformly tapered down to a thickness of 9.5 inches (241 mm) below the waterline. Forward of this it reduced to a maximum thickness of 10.5 inches (267 mm) until it reached the forward barbette and then extended to the bow with a thickness of 4 inches (102 mm). From the rear barbette aft, the rear hull was unarmored. The main-gun turrets were protected by 15–17 inches (381–432 mm) of armor, while the secondary turrets had 6–11 inches (152–279 mm) of armor. The barbettes were 12.5–15 inches (318–381 mm) thick, while the conning tower had 10 inches (254 mm) of armor.

== Construction and career ==
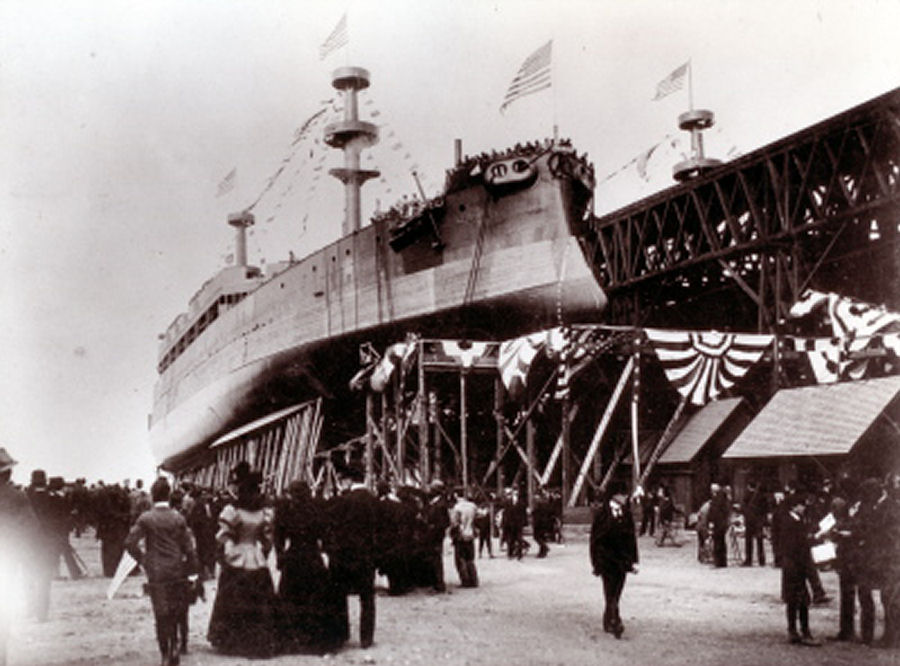
Kearsarge on the day of her launching, 24 March 1898. The masts of Kentucky are visible in the background.

Kearsarge was authorized on 2 March 1895, the contract for her construction was awarded on 2 January 1896, and the keel of the vessel was laid down on 30 June 1896 by Newport News Shipbuilding & Dry Dock Company in Virginia. The total cost was US$5,043,591.68. She was soon named after the Civil War sloop-of-war Kearsarge, and was the only US battleship not named after a state. She was christened on 24 March 1898 (the same day as her sister ship, Kentucky) by Mrs. Elizabeth Winslow (née Maynard), the wife of Captain Herbert Winslow, daughter-in-law of Captain John Ancrum Winslow, the commander of the original Kearsarge. She was commissioned on 20 February 1900, under the command of Captain William M. Folger.

As flagship of the North Atlantic Squadron, Kearsarge navigated along the Atlantic seaboard and the Caribbean Sea. By May 1902 the ship was being commanded by Captain Joseph Newton Hemphill. Reassigned as flagship of the European Squadron, she sailed from Sandy Hook on 3 June 1903, on her way to Kiel, Germany. She was visited by Emperor Wilhelm II of Germany on 25 June, and by the Prince of Wales – who would later become King George V of the United Kingdom – on 13 July.

Kearsarge returned to Bar Harbor, Maine, on 26 July, and resumed her position as flagship. On 1 December the ship sailed from New York for Guantánamo Bay, Cuba, where she was present as the United States took formal possession of the Guantanamo Naval Reservation on 10 December. On 26 March 1904 Captain Raymond P. Rodgers assumed command of the ship. Following maneuvers in the Caribbean Sea, Kearsarge left with the North Atlantic Squadron for Lisbon, Portugal, where she met King Carlos I of Portugal on 11 June 1904. Independence Day was celebrated in Phaleron Bay, Greece, with King George I of Greece and his son and daughter-in-law, Prince Andrew of Greece and Denmark and Princess Alice of Battenberg. The squadron visited Corfu, Trieste, and Fiume before returning to Newport, Rhode Island, on 29 August 1904.

On 31 March 1905, Maine replaced Kearsarge as flagship of the North Atlantic Fleet, although she remained with the fleet. Captain Herbert Winslow took command of the ship during December. On 13 April 1906, while participating in an exercise off Cape Cruz, Cuba, the gunpowder in a 13-inch gun ignited accidentally, killing two officers, eight men and wounding five others. After repairs Kearsarge participated in a presidential review in September and then in the Jamestown Exposition in early 1907.

=== Great White Fleet ===
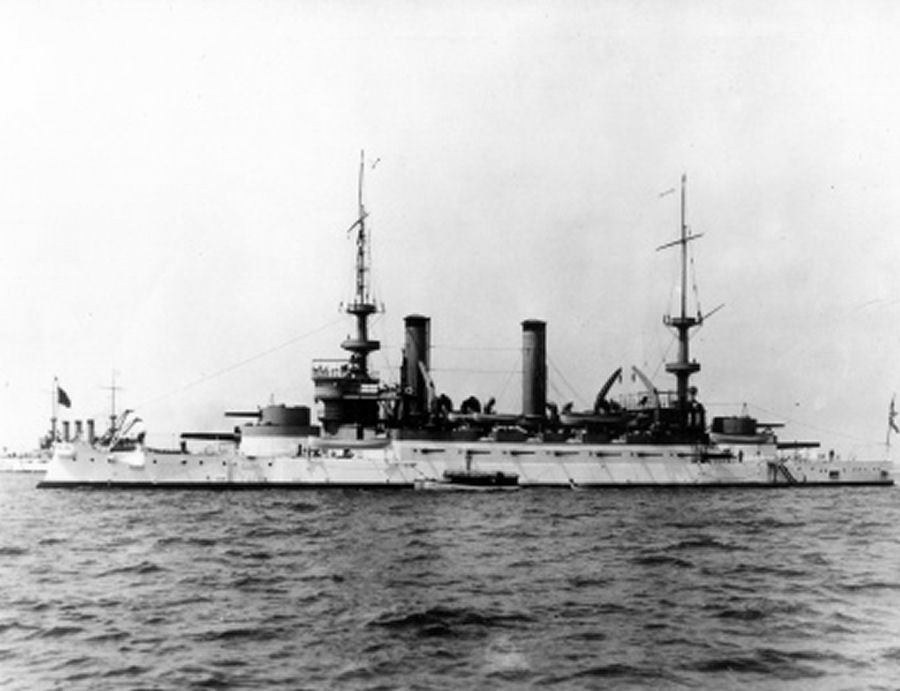
Kearsarge during the cruise of the Great White Fleet

President Theodore Roosevelt reviewed the Great White Fleet before its departure on 16 December 1907. Assigned to the Second Squadron, and under command of Captain Hamilton Hutchins, Kearsarge and the Great White Fleet departed from Hampton Roads, recoaled in Port of Spain, Trinidad, and visited Rio de Janeiro, Brazil, before passing through the Straits of Magellan. They passed by the west coast of South America, recoaling in Punta Arenas, Chile, and paraded through Valparaíso, Chile, without stopping. The fleet visited Callao, Peru, before pausing in Magdalena Bay, Mexico, for gunnery training. The fleet reached San Diego on 14 April 1908 and moved on to San Francisco on 6 May, Kearsarge visiting a variety of West Coast ports while also receiving repairs as needed. Two months later the warships sailed for Honolulu, Hawaii, and from there to Auckland, New Zealand, arriving 9 August. The fleet made Sydney, Australia, on 20 August, and after a week sailed for Melbourne.

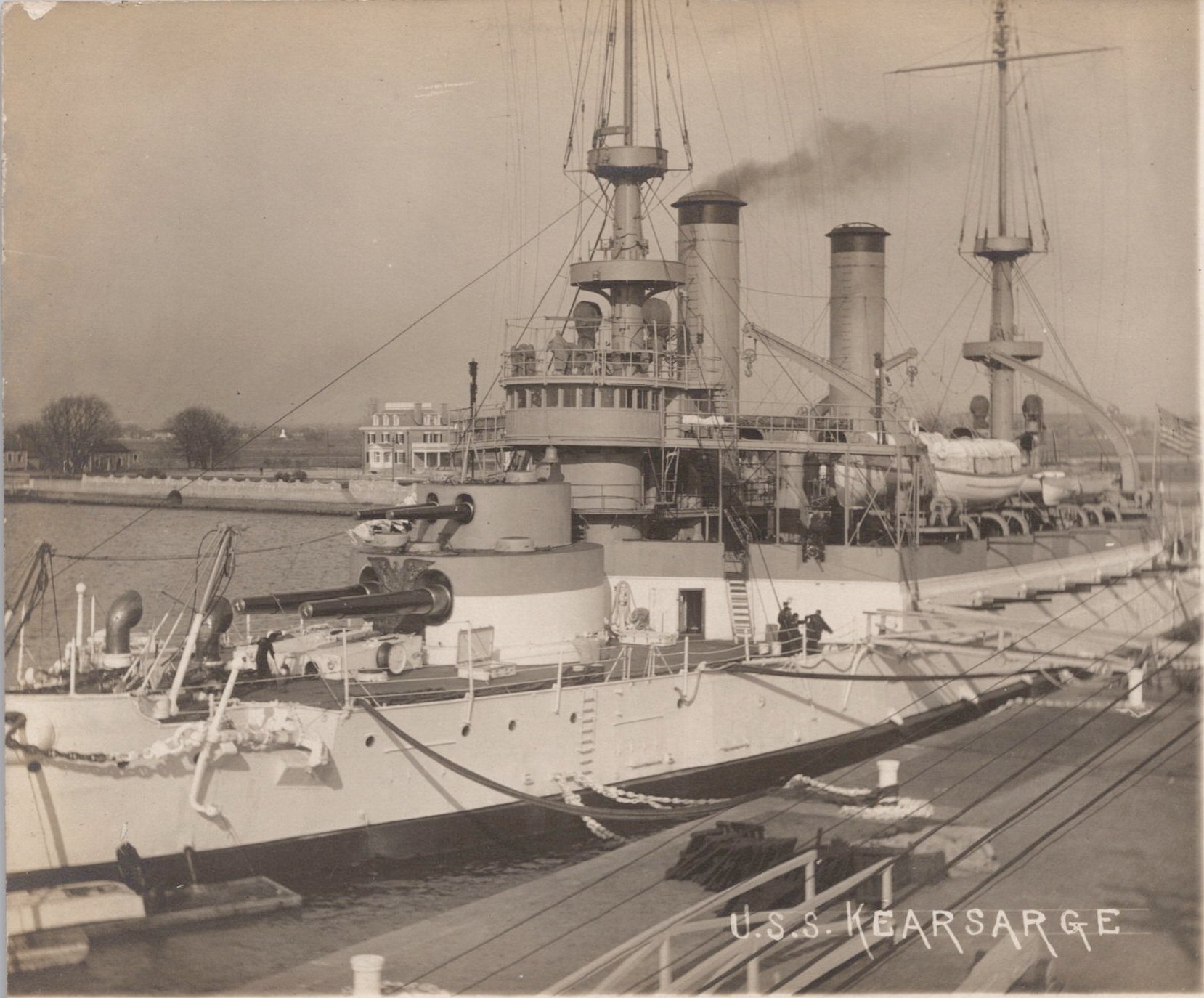
USS Kearsarge (BB-5) c. 1909

The battleships departed Albany, Western Australia, on 18 September to visit Manila, the Philippine Islands, where an outbreak of cholera kept the crews from going ashore. The Second Squadron split from the rest of the fleet and proceeded to Yokohama, Japan, in October despite being struck by a typhoon enroute. The squadron then made for Amoy (now Xiamen), China, before rejoining the First Squadron for gunnery practice in November. Sir Thomas Lipton entertained the men with tea during their sojourn in Colombo, Ceylon (now Sril Lanka), in late December. The fleet transiting the Suez Canal the following month and split at Port Said, Egypt, with Kearsarge leaving on 10 January 1909 for Malta, and arriving in Algiers on 24 January, before reforming with the fleet at Gibraltar on 1 February. She arrived back at Hampton Roads on 22 February, and was inspected by Roosevelt.

=== World War I ===
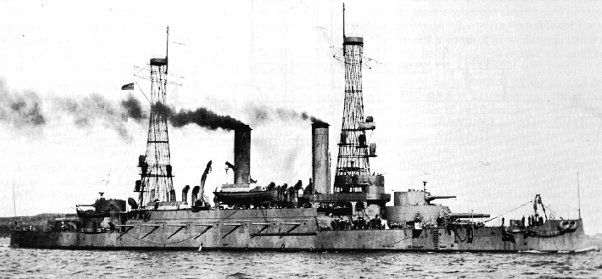
Kearsarge off Boston in October 1916, following her modernization

As with most of the Great White Fleet ships, Kearsarge was modernized on her return. She was decommissioned at the Philadelphia Naval Shipyard on 4 September 1909, and the modernization was completed in 1911, at a cost of US$675,000. The ship received cage masts, new water-tube boilers, and another four 5-inch guns. The remaining 1-pounder guns were removed, as were eight of the 6-pounders. The last four 6-pounders were eliminated sometime in 1915. She was recommissioned on 23 June 1915, and operated along the Atlantic coast. On 17 September she left Philadelphia to land a detachment of US Marines at Veracruz, Mexico, remaining there from 28 September 1915 to 5 January 1916. She then carried the Marines to New Orleans, Louisiana, before joining the Atlantic Reserve Fleet at Philadelphia on 4 February. Until the United States joined World War I, she trained naval militia from Massachusetts and Maine. During the war she was used to train Armed Guard crews and naval engineers during cruises along the Atlantic seaboard. Ten of the 5-inch guns were replaced by a pair of 3-inch (76 mm) anti-aircraft guns during 1917. On 18 August 1918 Kearsarge rescued 26 survivors of the Norwegian barque Nordhav which had been sunk by U-117, bringing them to Boston.

=== Inter-war period ===
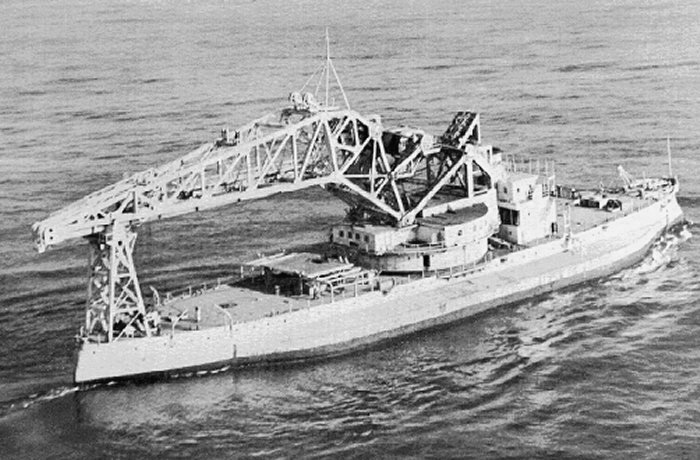
Kearsarge as Crane Ship No. 1

Between 29 May and 29 August 1919, Kearsarge trained United States Naval Academy midshipmen in the Caribbean. Kearsarge sailed from Annapolis, Maryland, to the Philadelphia Navy Yard, where she decommissioned on either 10 May or 18 May 1920.

Kearsarge was converted into a crane ship, and was given hull classification symbol IX-16 on 17 July 1920, but it was changed to AB-1 on 5 August. Her turrets, superstructure, and armor were removed, and were replaced by a large revolving crane with a lifting capacity of 250 tons (230 tonnes), as well as 10-foot (3.0 m) blisters, which improved her stability. The crane ship was utilized often over the next 20 years, including the raising of the submarine USS Squalus in 1939.

=== World War II ===
On 6 November 1941, Kearsarge was renamed Crane Ship No. 1, allowing her name to be given to the aircraft carriers Hornet (temporarily), and later to Kearsarge. She continued her service, however, handling guns, turrets, armor, and other heavy lifts for vessels such as Indiana, Alabama, Savannah, Chicago, and Pennsylvania.

She was transferred to the San Francisco Naval Shipyard in early 1945 and taken out of service in April when her crew was transferred elsewhere. The crane was subsequently manned by a civilian crew. On 14 May 1947, she was ordered to operate from Long Beach Naval Station at Terminal Island, California and was reactivated with a naval crew on 6 October 1947. One of her last projects was performing heavy lifts during the reassembly of another crane vessel, YD-171 (ex-Schwimmkran nr. 1) on Terminal Island. In 1948 she left the West Coast for the Boston Naval Shipyard. On 22 June 1955 her name was struck from the Naval Vessel Register, and she was sold for scrap on 9 August.

== Bibliography ==
=== Books ===
- Bauer, Karl Jack & Roberts, Stephen S. (1991). Register of Ships of the U.S. Navy, 1775–1990: Major Combatants. Westport, Connecticut: Greenwood Publishing Group. p. 103. ISBN 0-313-26202-0.
- Campbell, N. J. M. (1979). "United States of America — 'The New Navy' 1883–1905". In Chesneau, Roger & Koleśnik, Eugène M. (eds.). Conway's All the World's Fighting Ships 1860–1905. Conway Maritime Press. pp. 137–169. ISBN 0-85177-133-5.
- Crawford, Michael J. (2008). The World Cruise of the Great White Fleet: Honoring 100 Years of Global Partnerships and Security. Washington, D.C.: United States Government Printing Office. ISBN 978-0-945274-59-9.
- Daniels, Josephus, ed. (1920). German Submarine Activities on the Atlantic Coast of the United States and Canada (PDF). Washington, D.C.: United States Government Printing Office. p. 95 – via Federation of American Scientists.
- Faltum, Andrew (1996). The Essex Aircraft Carriers. Baltimore, Maryland: Nautical & Aviation. ISBN 1-877853-26-7.
- Fitzsimons, Bernard (1978). The Illustrated Encyclopedia of 20th Century Weapons and Warfare. Vol. 15. Milwaukee: Purnell Reference Books. p. 1581. ISBN 978-0-8393-6175-6.
- Friedman, Norman (1985). U.S. Battleships, An Illustrated Design History. Annapolis, Maryland: Naval Institute Press. ISBN 0-87021-715-1.
- Garzke, William H. Jr. & Dulin, Robert O. Jr. (1995). Battleships: United States Battleships, 1935–1992 (2nd revised and illustrated ed.). Annapolis, Maryland: Naval Institute Press. p. 72. ISBN 1-55750-174-2.
- Graff, Cory; Puget Sound Navy Museum (2010). The Navy in Puget Sound. Charleston, South Carolina: Arcadia Publishing. p. 54. ISBN 978-0-7385-8081-4.
- Morris, James Matthew & Kearns, Patricia M. (2011). "Kearsarge, USS (BB5), battleship". Historical Dictionary of the United States Navy (2nd ed.). Lanham, Maryland: Scarecrow Press. p. 206. ISBN 978-0-8108-7229-5.
- Newhart, Max R. (1995). American Battleships: A Pictorial History of BB-1 to BB-71. Missoula, Montana: Pictorial Histories Publishing Company. ISBN 978-1-57510-004-3.
- Polmar, Norman (2005). The Naval Institute Guide to the Ships and Aircraft of the U.S. Fleet (18th ed.). Annapolis, Maryland: Naval Institute Press. p. 242. ISBN 978-1-59114-685-8.
- Reilly, John C. & Scheina, Robert L. (1980). American Battleships 1886–1923: Predreadnought Design and Construction. Naval Institute Press. ISBN 0-87021-524-8.

=== Newspapers ===
- "Kentucky is Launched" (PDF). Houston Daily Post. 25 March 1898. p. 4 – via Library of Congress.
- "The New Kearsarge" (PDF). Times. Washington, D.C. 20 February 1900. p. 5 – via Library of Congress.
- "A Dinner in Their Honor" (PDF). New-York Tribune. 29 May 1902. p. 3 – via Library of Congress.
- "The Kearsarge Off for Kiel" (PDF). New-York Tribune. 4 June 1903. p. 3 – via Library of Congress.
- "Kaiser Warmly Praises Visiting American Fleet" (PDF). St. Louis Republic. 26 June 1903. p. 1 – via Library of Congress.
- "Prince of Wales a Guest Aboard the Kearsarge" (PDF). The San Francisco Call. 14 July 1903. p. 3 – via Library of Congress.
- "Kearsarge Ends Her Ocean Race" (PDF). The San Francisco Call. 27 July 1903. p. 3 – via Library of Congress.
- ""Enemy's" Fleet Leaves Bar Harbor for the Mimic War" (PDF). The Washington Times. 3 August 1903. p. 1 – via Library of Congress.
- "Battleships Begin Winter Cruise" (PDF). The San Francisco Call. 2 December 1903. p. 3 – via Library of Congress.
- "Formal Occupancy of Guantanamo" (PDF). The San Francisco Call. 11 December 1903. p. 11 – via Library of Congress.
- "To Command the Kearsarge" (PDF). Evening Bulletin. Maysville, Kentucky. 26 March 1904. p. 1 – via Library of Congress.
- "Extraordinary Honors for American Squadron" (PDF). St. Louis Republic. 12 June 1904. p. 11 – via Library of Congress.
- "Warships in the Adriatic" (PDF). Evening Star. Washington, D.C. 8 July 1904. p. 1 – via Library of Congress.
- "Foreign Affairs" (PDF). Edgefield Advertiser. 3 August 1904. p. 1 – via Library of Congress.
- "To Engage in Target Practice" (PDF). Evening Star. Washington, D.C. 24 March 1905. p. 5 – via Library of Congress.
- "To Command the Kearsarge" (PDF). Evening Star. Washington, D.C. 13 December 1905. p. 17 – via Library of Congress.
- "Admiral Evans on the Kearsarge Explosion" (PDF). Pensacola Journal. 21 April 1905. p. 1 – via Library of Congress.
- "Naval Funeral for Lieut. Graeme" (PDF). New-York Tribune. 24 April 1905. p. 7 – via Library of Congress.
- "Admiral H. Winslow Dead" (PDF). The New York Times. 26 September 1914.

=== Online resources ===
- Anderson, R. Wayne (January 1960). "A Page from the Old Navy: USS Kearsarge—Fifty-Six Years and Three Careers". U.S. Naval Institute Proceedings. 86 (1).
- "Crane Ship No. 1 (AB 1)". Naval Vessel Register. United States Navy.
- Evans, Mark L. & Marcello, Paul J. (12 December 2017). "Kearsarge II (Battleship No. 5): 1896–1955". Dictionary of American Naval Fighting Ships. Navy Department, Naval History and Heritage Command.
- "One Crane Builds Another". Popular Mechanics. Vol. 90, no. 3. Popular Mechanics Company. September 1948. pp. 96–97.
- Roberts, Stephen S. (December 2010). "Unclassified (IX), Special Types". Register of Ships of the U.S. Navy: Auxiliary Vessels 1884–1945.
