= Celebracion: Epic Duets =

Celebración: Epic Duets

Studio album by Eddie Santiago
- Released: December 14, 1999
- Genre: Salsa
- Length: 41:41
- Label: Sony Discos
- Producer: Cucco Peña; Sergio George

Eddie Santiago chronology
Enamorado (1997)	Celebración: Epic Duets (1999)	Ahora (2001)

Celebración: Epic Duets is a 1999 album by Eddie Santiago. It includes his all-time best hits in a duet format, with an all-star cast of vocalists. The album received a positive review from AllMusic.

== Track listing ==
This information adapted from CdUniverse.

No.	Title	Length
1.	"Celebración"	4:44
2.	"Que Locura Enamorarme de Ti - (feat Huey Dunbar)"	4:57
3.	"Me Fallaste - (feat George Lamond)"	4:08
4.	"Antídoto y Veneno - (feat Victor Manuelle)"	4:33
5.	"Tú Me Haces Falta - (feat Elvis Crespo)"	4:20
6.	"Tú Me Quemas - (feat Robby Salinas)"	4:20
7.	"Todo Empezó - (feat Son By Four)"	5:11
8.	"Lluvia - (feat Charlie Zaa)"	5:00
9.	"Mía - (feat Obie Bermúdez)"	4:16

== Credits ==
=== Musicians ===
- Eddie Santiago (vocals)
- Elvis Crespo, Robby Salinas, Melina Leon
- Son By 4, Huey Dunbar, George Lamond
- Victor Manuelle, Charlie Zaa, Obie Bermudez
- Ito Serrano (guitar)
- Luis Aquino, Angie Machado, Raul Agraz, Richard Viruet (trumpet)
- Tonito Vazquez, Miguel Rivera, Jorge Diaz, Ozzie Melendez, Pablo Santaella (trombone)
- Miguel Bonilla (piano, synthesizer)
- Ramon Sanchez, Sergio George, Edwin Sanchez, Jose "Lenny" Prieto (piano)
- Jose Gazmey, Ricardo Lugo, Ruben Rodriguez (bass)
- Charlie Sierra (bongos, timbales, percussion)
- Ray Colon (bongos, percussion)
- Bobby Allende (congas, timbales)
- Jimmy Morales, George Delgado (congas)
- Jeff Lopez (timbales)
- Marc Quinones (percussion)
- Luis Cabaracas (programming, background vocals)
- Daruel Garcia, Chequi Ramos, Ramon Rodriguez, Johnny Rivera, Julio Barreto, Chris Alfines, Luchito Cabarcas (background vocals)

=== Production ===
- Authors: William Paz; Alejandro Jaén; Alejandro Vezzani; Luis Angel; Palmer Hernandez
- Arrangers: Cheo Arce; José Gazmey; Miguel Bonilla; Ramón Sánchez
- Director: Sergio George
- Engineers: Vinny Urrutia, Kerk Upper, Jose Caldas
- Recording Studio:

== Charts ==
Chart (2000)	Peak position
US Top Latin Albums (Billboard)	8
US Tropical Albums (Billboard)	3
