= Lo Esencial =

- Lo Esencial or Lo Esencial de may refer to:
- Lo Esencial (Aterciopelados album)
- Lo Esencial (Jeanette album)
- Lo Esencial, album by Alejandra Guzmán
- Lo Esencial, album by Armando Manzanero
- Lo Esencial, album by Dark Latin Groove
- Lo Esencial, album by Emmanuel
- Lo Esencial, album by Joan Sebastian
- Lo Esencial, album by José Alfredo Jiménez
- Lo Esencial, album by Rocío Dúrcal
- Lo Esencial, album by Son by Four
- Lo Esencial, album by Willy Chirino
- Lo Esencial de... Alejandro Sanz, album by Alejandro Sánz
- Lo Esencial de Maná, album by Maná
- Lo Esencial de Ricardo Arjona, album by Ricardo Arjona
- Lo Esencial de Álvaro, album by Álvaro Torres
- Lo Esencial de La Arrolladora Banda El Limón, album by La Arrolladora Banda El Limón
- Lo Esencial de Ana Gabriel, album by Ana Gabriel
- Lo Esencial de Annette Moreno, album by Annette Moreno
- Lo Esencial de Belinda, album by Belinda Peregrín
- Lo Esencial de Café Tacvba, album by Café Tacuba
- Lo Esencial de Fey, album by Fey
- Lo Esencial de Juan Gabriel, album by Juan Gabriel
- Lo Esencial de Leo Dan, album by Leo Dan
- Lo Esencial de Lucía Méndez, album by Lucía Méndez
- Lo Esencial de Maelo, album by Maelo Ruiz
- Lo Esencial de Yuridia, album by Yuridia

== See also ==
- Esencial (disambiguation)
