= Goodwinslow =

Historic house in Tennessee, United States

- U.S. National Register of Historic Places
- Location within Tennessee
- Location: 4066 James Road, Raleigh, Tennessee
- Coordinates: 35°12′35″N 89°55′35″W
- Area: 6.1 acres (2.5 ha)
- Built: 1875
- Architectural style: Italian villa
- NRHP reference No.: 79002482
- Added to NRHP: December 6, 1979

Goodwinslow, also known as Chapman House, is a historic house in Raleigh, Tennessee. It was built from 1875 to 1900 for William Washington Goodwin. It remained in the Goodwin-Chapman family in the 1970s, and owners and residents included Eben Eveleth Winslow and Anne Goodwin Winslow.

The house was designed to resemble an Italian villa. It has been listed on the National Register of Historic Places since December 6, 1979.
