= Music for My Peoples =

Studio album by Huey Dunbar
- Released: August 19, 2003 (U.S.)
- Recorded: 2003
- Genre: Dance, hip hop, R&B, salsa
- Length: 45:25
- Label: Sony Discos Inc.
- Producer: Albert Sterling Menendez, Jimmy Greco, Lenny Santos, Magic Juan, Miguel Bonilla, Mikey Santos, Ray Contreras, and Sergio George

Huey Dunbar chronology
Yo Si Me Enamoré (2001)	Music for My Peoples (2003)

Singles from Music for My Peoples
- 1. "Sin Poderte Hablar" Released: 2003; 2. "A Donde Ire" Released: 2003

Professional ratings
Review scores
Source	Rating
AllMusic	4/5 stars

Music for My Peoples is the second studio album from Huey Dunbar. It was released on August 19, 2003, with the singles "Sin Poderte Hablar" and "A Donde Ire".

== Track listing ==
1. "Sin Poderte Hablar - 3:21
2. "Jamás" (Salsa Version) - 4:00
3. "Bacardi Party" (featuring Magic Juan) - 3:36
4. "Las Noches" - 3:23
5. "Llegaste Tú" - 4:09
6. "Spring Love" (Spanish Version) - 3:37
7. "A Dónde Iré" - 4:16
8. "Bésame" - 3:37
9. "Spring Love" (English Version) - 3:37
10. "Jamás" (Acoustic Version) - 4:17
11. "Fuerte" - 4:07
12. "Chasing Papi" - 3:40

== Charts ==
Chart (2003)	Peak position
US Tropical Albums (Billboard)	7
