= In My Life (George Lamond album) =

Studio album by George Lamond
- Released: September 15, 1992
- Studio: Ligosa Sound Studios, Homebase Studios, Mirror Image, Audiocraft
- Genre: Latin freestyle
- Length: 46:10
- Label: Columbia
- Producer: Chris Barbosa, Mark Liggett

George Lamond chronology
Bad of the Heart (1990)	In My Life (1992)	Creo En Ti (1993)

In My Life is the second studio album by Latin freestyle artist George Lamond. It was released on September 15, 1992, by Columbia Records. The album spawned three singles; the first, “Where Does That Leave Love”, reached #66 on the U.S. Billboard Hot 100. The second single was a cover of New Kids on the Block's "Baby, I Believe In You". The album’s third and final single, “I Want You Back” was released spring 1993 and made it to #33 on Billboards "Dance Club Songs".

== Track listing ==
No.	Title	Writer(s)	Length
1.	"Where Does That Leave Love"	John Bastianelli, Larry Lange	4:13
2.	"Distant Heart"	Bastianelli, Lange	5:32
3.	"I'll See You In My Dreams"	Bastianelli, Lange	5:31
4.	"Heaven In My Hands"	Billy Devon, Mark Duffy, Michael Jay, Neil McDiarmid, Richard Hennessey	4:45
5.	"She Walked Out Of My Life"	Lange, Ed Palermo, John Palermo	4:47
6.	"Baby, I Believe in You"	Maurice Starr	4:46
7.	"Unsociable"	Bastianelli, Camille Gucciardo	4:35
8.	"I Want You Back"	The Corporation	3:42
9.	"Everytime The Rain Starts To Fall"	David Cole, Robert Clivillés	4:17
10.	"Cry For Love"	Bastianelli, Lange, Chris Barbosa, Denise Rich	5:27
11.	"In My Life"	Clyde Lieberman, Jeff Pescetto, Richard James Burgess	4:32
12.	"My One And Only Love"	George Lamond, Bastianelli	4:23
13.	"Where Does That Leave Love (Where House Mix)"		4:04
