= Love's Contagious =

Single by George Lamond

from the album Bad of the Heart
- Released: May 24, 1991
- Genre: Dance-pop, Freestyle
- Length: 5:30 (album version)
- Label: Columbia
- Songwriter(s): John Bastianelli, Larry Lange
- Producer(s): Mark Liggett, Chris Barbosa

George Lamond singles chronology
"No Matter What" (1990)	"Love's Contagious" (1991)	"Where Does That Leave Love" (1992)

"Love's Contagious" is the fifth single from freestyle singer George Lamond's debut album Bad of the Heart.

== Track listing ==
US 12" Single

No.	Title	Length
1.	"Love's Contagious" (Extended Pop Dance Mix)	6:24
2.	"Love's Contagious" (Contagious Radio Edit)	4:10
3.	"Love's Contagious" (Lamond Master Mix Medley)	9:31
4.	"Love's Contagious" (Freestyle Dance Remix)	7:27
5.	"Love's Contagious" (Percapella Plus)	4:19
6.	"Love's Contagious" (Contagious Beats)	3:24

== Charts ==
Chart (1991)	Peak Position
U.S. Billboard Hot Dance Music/Maxi-Singles Sales	40
