= Marcella Comès Winslow =

American painter

- Born: Marcella Rodange Comès; September 3, 1905; Pittsburgh, Pennsylvania, US
- Died: July 6, 2000 (aged 94)
- Education: Carnegie Mellon College of Fine Arts
- Known for: Photographer and portrait painter
- Notable work: Official portrait painter of the United States Poet Laureate; held literary salons in her home in Georgetown
- Spouse: William Randolph Winslow
- Elected: President of the Washington, D.C. chapter of Artists Equity Association; Vice President for the organizations' national association. Member of the Corcoran Gallery of Art's Women's Commission

Marcella Comès Winslow (born Marcella Rodange Comès; September 3, 1905 – July 6, 2000) was an American photographer and portrait painter. She was the official portrait painter of the United States Poet Laureate.

== Life and education ==
Marcella Rodange Comès was born in Pittsburgh, Pennsylvania on September 3, 1905, one of three daughters of architect John T. Comès and his wife, Honora B. "Nora" Webber. She attended the Carnegie Mellon College of Fine Arts. She also trained in Europe. She taught painting at the Catholic University from 1965 to 1969.

She lived in Washington, D.C. and was active in the art scene. She was married to Colonel William Randolph Winslow, the son of Eben Eveleth Winslow and Anne Goodwin Winslow, who served in World War I and World War II. Comès raised their two children in Washington while Colonel Winslow was stationed in England. Their home in Georgetown was a salon space frequented by literary figures of the time. Colonel Winslow died of pneumonia while serving in 1945.

Comès died on July 6, 2000, aged 94 or 95, and was buried in Arlington National Cemetery alongside her husband.

== Career ==
Comès was the official portrait painter of the United States Poet Laureate. As an official portrait painter, she painted portraits of Allen Tate, Elizabeth Bishop, Karl Shapiro, and Léonie Adams. She also painted portraits of Robert Lowell, Ezra Pound, Saint-John Perse, Caroline Gordon, Walter de la Mare, John Rothenstein, Denis Devlin, Juan Ramón Jiménez, Richard Eberhart, Robert Frost, Katherine Anne Porter, Anne Goodwin Winslow, Mark Van Doren, Robert Penn Warren, Eudora Welty, Walter Jackson Bate, and John Huston Finley.

She served as president of the Washington, D.C. chapter of the Artists Equity Association and was vice president for the organizations' national association. She was involved as a member of the Corcoran Gallery of Art's Women's Commission.

== Legacy ==
Her work is held in the collections of the Harvard Art Museums and the National Portrait Gallery. Her papers are held in the Archives of American Art.
