= Without You (George Lamond song) =

Single by George Lamond

from the album Bad of the Heart
- Released: August 14, 1989
- Genre: Dance-pop, Freestyle
- Length: 4:42 (album version)
- Label: Columbia
- Songwriter: Philip Andreula
- Producers: Mark Liggett, Chris Barbosa

George Lamond singles chronology
"Without You" (1989)	"Bad of the Heart" (1990)

"Without You" is the debut single from freestyle singer George Lamond's debut album Bad of the Heart. The song was released on August 14, 1989, by Columbia Records. It was written by Philip Andreula and produced by Mark Liggett and Chris Barbosa.

== Track listing ==
US 12" single

No.	Title	Length
1.	"Without You" (Extended Dance Mix)	7:50
2.	"Without You" (Radio Edit)	4:40
3.	"Without You" (A Capella)	4:20
4.	"Without You" (Freestyle Dance Mix)	7:14
5.	"Without You" (Dub Mix)	6:15
6.	"Without You" (Acapella/Bonus Beats)	8:03

== Charts ==
Chart (1989)	Peak Position
U.S. Billboard Hot Dance Music/Club Play	4
U.S. Billboard Hot Dance Music/Maxi-Singles Sales	32
