= Eben Eveleth Winslow =

U.S. Army brigadier general

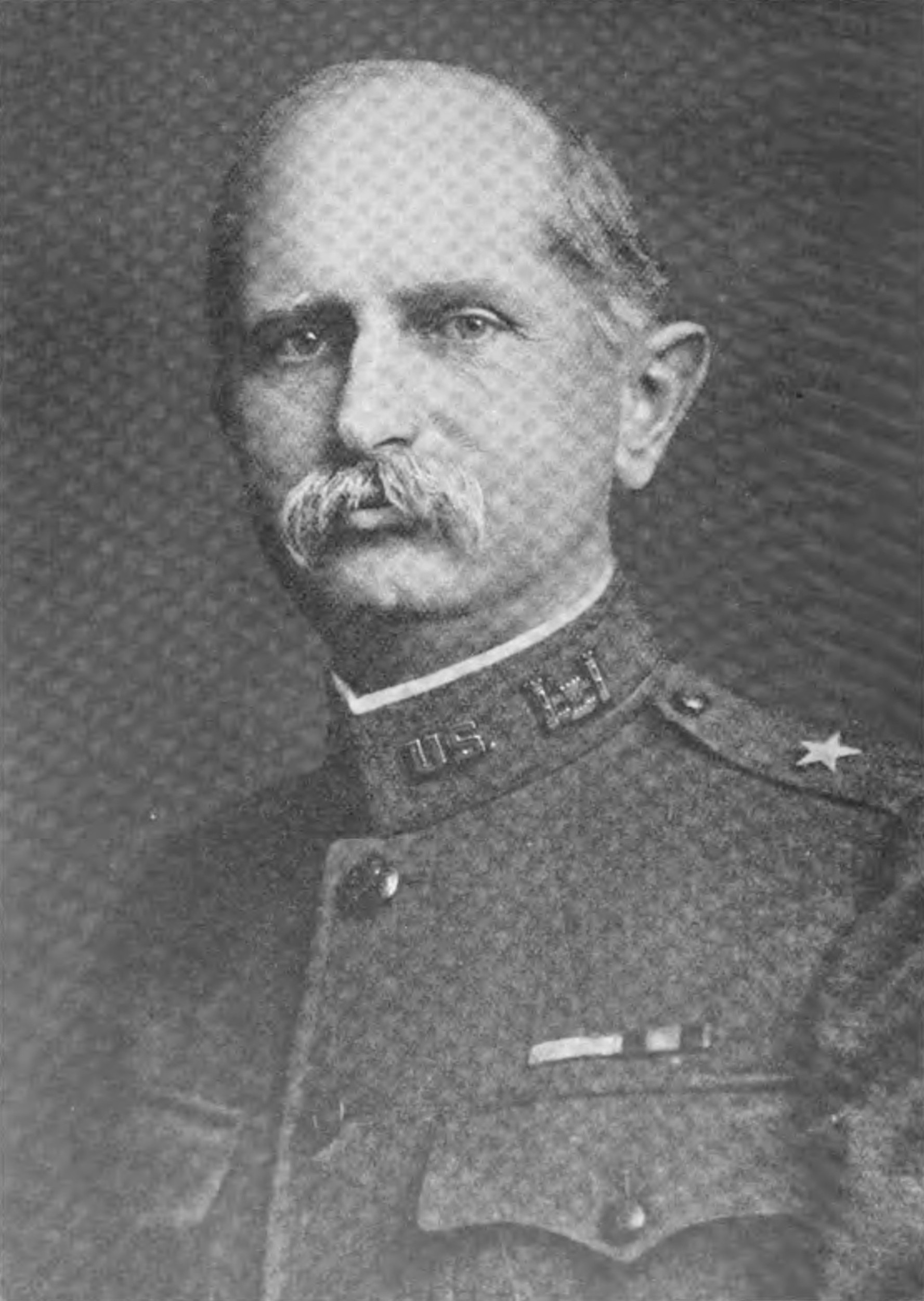
- Winslow circa 1918. Special Collections, United States Military Academy Library.
- Born: Ebenezer Eveleth Winslow; May 13, 1866; Washington, D.C., U.S.
- Died: June 28, 1928 (aged 62); Raleigh, Memphis, Tennessee, U.S.
- Burial place: Arlington National Cemetery
- Other names: E. Eveleth Winslow, E. E. Winslow
- Spouse: Anne Goodwin Winslow (m. 1900–1928)
- Children: 2
- Relatives: John Ancrum Winslow (grandfather); Herbert Winslow (uncle); Marcella Comès Winslow (daughter-in-law)
- Military career
- Allegiance: United States
- Service: United States Army
- Service years: 1889–1922
- Rank: Brigadier General
- Service number: 0–215
- Unit: United States Army Corps of Engineers
- Commands: Company E, Battalion of Engineers; 1st Mississippi River Improvement District; 2nd Mississippi River Improvement District; Harbor Fortifications of Wilmington, North Carolina; Harbor Fortifications of Norfolk, Virginia; United States Army Engineer School; Washington Barracks; Harbor Fortifications of Oahu; 1st Engineer Battalion; 2nd Engineer Battalion; Coastal Fortifications of San Francisco Bay
- Wars: Spanish–American War; World War I
- Awards: Army Distinguished Service Medal

Eben Eveleth Winslow (May 13, 1866 – June 28, 1928) was a career officer in the United States Army. He graduated from the United States Military Academy ranked first in the Class of 1889, and served in the Army's Corps of Engineers. A veteran of the Spanish–American War and World War I, he attained the rank of brigadier general and was a recipient of the Army Distinguished Service Medal.

== Early life ==
Eben E. Winslow was born in Washington, D.C. on May 13, 1866, the son of Commander William Randolph Winslow, a paymaster in the United States Navy and Catherine (Eveleth) Winslow. Winslow's grandfather John Ancrum Winslow was a career navy officer and American Civil War veteran who attained the rank of rear admiral. His uncle, Herbert Winslow, was also a career Navy officer who attained the rank of rear admiral. His family was long prominent in New England; his ancestors included veterans of the American Revolutionary War, as well as Mayflower passenger Mary Chilton and her husband John Winslow, who arrived in Massachusetts aboard the ship Fortune a year after the Mayflower.

Winslow's father died in 1869 and he was raised by his mother in Washington, in addition to spending significant time at the home of his grandparents in Boston. He was an 1882 graduate of Washington's Central High School and graduated from Washington's Columbian Preparatory School as valedictorian in 1883. During Winslow's high school years, Washington's high schools fielded a uniformed corps of cadets, which enabled students to take part in drill and ceremony competitions, and Winslow gained his initial military experience as a member.

In 1885, Winslow competed for an appointment to the United States Military Academy (West Point) offered by U.S. Representative Ambrose Ranney of Boston. He finished first on the examination, received the appointment, and attended West Point from 1885 to 1889. At the end of his senior year, Winslow ranked first in every academic subject except law and chemistry, in which he was second, and drawing, in which he ranked seventh. His academic accomplishments were especially noteworthy because an extended period of convalescence after a horse riding accident during his senior year prevented him from regularly attending classroom lectures. Winslow graduated first of 49 and received his commission as a second lieutenant of Engineers.

== Start of career ==
Winslow was initially assigned to Company B of the Battalion of Engineers, which was stationed with the Engineer School at Fort Totten, New York. He served with Company B until May 1892, when he was assigned to construct and improve river and harbor defenses at the Port of Mobile, Alabama. He was promoted to first lieutenant in April 1894.

From May 1896 to April 1898, Winslow served on the West Point faculty as assistant instructor of practical military engineering. At the start of the Spanish–American War in April 1898, he joined Company E, Battalion of Engineers, which was assigned to the Fifth Army Corps for the Siege of Santiago. He took part in the Battle of San Juan Hill on July 1, and was promoted to captain on July 5. He returned to the West Point faculty in August, and taught military engineering while commanding Company E. In November 1989, Winslow was assigned to Memphis, Tennessee as commander of the 1st and 2nd Mississippi River Improvement Districts.

Winslow was assigned to Wilmington, North Carolina in November 1902, where he commanded the construction of river and harbor fortifications. In May 1903, he was posted to Norfolk, Virginia as commander of river and harbor fortifications construction. In November 1906, he was assigned to Washington Barracks as commandant of the United States Army Engineer School and commander of the post. He was promoted to major in April 1906, and in September 1907, Winslow was assigned as assistant to the Chief of Engineers.

== Continued career ==
In October 1908, Winslow was assigned to Fort DeRussy, Hawaii, where he commanded harbor and river fortification construction on Oahu. From November 1908 to May 1909, he commanded the 1st Engineer Battalion, and he commanded the 2nd Engineer Battalion from May 1909 to April 1911. From April 1911 to April 1912, he served at the Office of the Chief of Engineers and the Panama Canal Zone, where he designed the canal zone's fortifications. From July 1912 to September 1914, he served again as commander of the coastal fortifications of Norfolk, Virginia. Winslow was promoted to lieutenant colonel in October 1912.

Winslow served again as assistant to the Chief of Engineers from September 1914 to July 1919. Winslow was promoted to colonel in May 1917. With the Army expanding during U.S. participation in World War I, he was promoted to temporary brigadier general in August 1917. His wartime service to train, equip, and field Engineer units was recognized with award of the Army Distinguished Service Medal.

The President of the United States of America, authorized by Act of Congress, July 9, 1918, takes pleasure in presenting the Army Distinguished Service Medal to Colonel (Corps of Engineers) Eben Eveleth Winslow, United States Army, for exceptionally meritorious and distinguished services to the Government of the United States, in a duty of great responsibility during World War I. While in charge of the Military Section of the Office of the Chief of Engineers during the early period of the war, Colonel Winslow's services were marked by the energy, zeal, and good judgment which were essential to the procurement of personnel and equipment and the organization and training of engineer organizations for overseas service.

General Orders: War Department, General Orders No. 47 (1919)

== Later career ==
Following the end of the war, Winslow returned to his permanent rank of colonel. In July 1919, Winslow was assigned to command the coastal fortifications of San Francisco Bay. He remained in this post until November 1922, when he was retired due to physical disability. In retirement, Winslow was a resident of Raleigh, Memphis, Tennessee. He died in Raleigh on June 28, 1928 and was buried at Arlington National Cemetery. In 1930, the U.S. Congress passed legislation allowing the general officers of World War I to retire at their highest rank and Winslow was posthumously promoted to brigadier general on the retired list.

== Works by ==
- A Résumé of the Operations in the First and Second Districts, Mississippi River Improvements, 1882–1901. Washington, DC: Press of the Engineer School. 1910 – via Google Books.
- "The Work of the Corps of Engineers, United States Army". Proceedings of the Second Pan–American Congress. Vol. V: Engineering. Washington, DC: U.S. Government Printing Office. 1917. pp. 327–336 – via Google Books.
- Notes On Seacoast Fortification Construction. Washington, DC: U.S. Government Printing Office. 1920 – via Google Books.

== Family ==
In October 1900, Winslow married Anne Goodwin Winslow of Raleigh, Tennessee, and they were married until his death. They were the parents of two children, William and Mary.

William Randolph Winslow (1901–1945) was a career army officer who served in World War I and World War II, and was the husband of Marcella Comès Winslow. Mary Winslow Chapman (1903–1995) was a Raleigh author and real estate developer, and was involved in the historic preservation of her family's Goodwinslow mansion.
