= Esencial =

Esencial may refer to:

- Esencial (Christian Chávez album), 2012
- Esencial (Mónica Naranjo album), 2013
- Esencial (Ricky Martin album), 2018

== See also ==
- Lo Esencial (disambiguation)
