= Look into My Eyes (George Lamond song) =

Single by George Lamond

from the album Bad of the Heart
- Released: August 2, 1990
- Recorded: 1989
- Genre: Dance-pop, Freestyle
- Length: 5:17 (album version)
- Label: Columbia
- Songwriters: Philip Andreula, Dominic Marabeti
- Producers: Mark Liggett, Chris Barbosa

George Lamond singles chronology
"Bad of the Heart" (1990)	"Look into My Eyes" (1990)	"No Matter What" (1990)

"Look into My Eyes" is a song by American freestyle singer George Lamond, released in August 1990 by Columbia Records as the third single from his debut album, Bad of the Heart (1990). The song peaked at numbers 60 and 63 on the US Cash Box Top 100 and Billboard Hot 100 charts. It was written by Philip Andreula, Dominic Marabeti and produced by Mark Liggett and Chris Barbosa.

== Track listing ==
US CD Maxi-Single

No.	Title	Length
1.	"Look into My Eyes" (Edit)	4:09
2.	"Look into My Eyes" (Album Version)	5:14
3.	"Look into My Eyes" (Dance Version)	6:51

US 12" Single

No.	Title	Length
1.	"Look into My Eyes" (Extended Dance Mix)	6:51
2.	"Look into My Eyes" (Radio Edit)	4:09
3.	"Look into My Eyes" (Bonus Beats)	3:03
4.	"Look into My Eyes" (Hip Hop Swing Mix)	5:33
5.	"Look into My Eyes" (Percapella Plus)	3:43

== Charts ==
Chart (1990)	Peak Position
US Billboard Hot 100	63
US Hot Dance Music/Club Play (Billboard)	4
US Hot Dance Music/Maxi-Singles Sales (Billboard)	6
US Cash Box Top 100	60
