= Herbert Winslow =

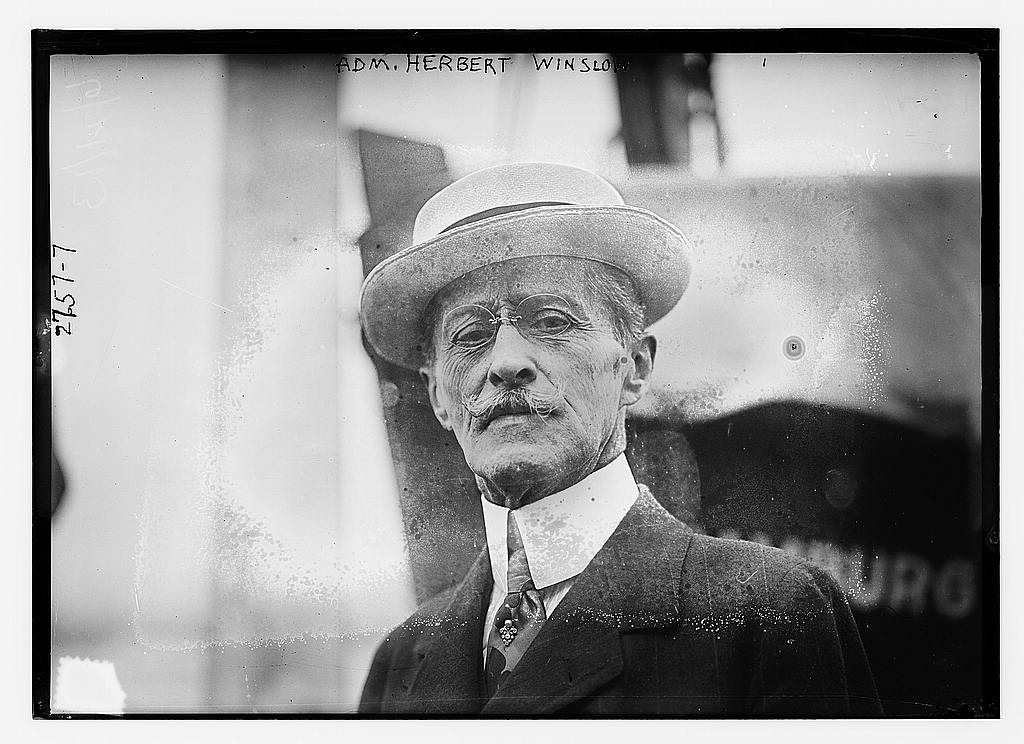
- Herbert Winslow, circa 1910
- Born: September 22, 1848; Roxbury, Massachusetts, United States
- Died: September 25, 1914 (aged 66); Florence, Italy
- Education: United States Naval Academy
- Occupation(s): rear admiral, United States Navy
- Spouse: Elizabeth Maynard (m. 1876; died 1899)
- Father: John Ancrum Winslow
- Relatives: Edward Winslow (Mayflower)

Herbert Winslow (September 22, 1848 – September 25, 1914) was a rear admiral in the United States Navy.

== Biography ==
He was born in 1848 in Roxbury, Massachusetts, to future Rear Admiral John Ancrum Winslow (1811-1873) and Catherine Amelia Winslow (1813-1890). Through his paternal line, he was a direct descendant of Mayflower passenger Edward Winslow. Winslow's brother, William Randolph Winslow, was a career Navy officer who spent his career as a paymaster. His nephew, Eben Eveleth Winslow, was a career United States Army officer who attained the rank of brigadier general.

Winslow entered the United States Naval Academy in July 1865 and graduated four years later. He commanded the USS Fern at the Battle of Santiago de Cuba on July 3, 1898. He retired on September 22, 1910, having reached the mandatory retirement age of 62, and moved to Cherbourg, France.

He married Elizabeth Maynard (December 1854 – March 3, 1899), daughter of Lafayette Maynard, in 1876. She died in 1899 while Winslow was serving as executive officer of the Naval Training Station in Newport, Rhode Island.

He was a hereditary companion of the Massachusetts Commandery of the Military Order of the Loyal Legion of the United States by right of his father's service in the Union Navy during the American Civil War.

He died in Florence, Italy on September 25, 1914. He is buried with his father at Forest Hills Cemetery in Jamaica Plain, Boston.
