= Bad of the Heart (song) =

1990 single by George Lamond

Single by George Lamond

from the album Bad of the Heart
- Released: March 22, 1990
- Genre: Dance-pop, Freestyle
- Length: 4:20 (album version)
- Label: Columbia
- Songwriters: Philip Andreula, Marilyn Rodriguez
- Producers: Mark Liggett, Chris Barbosa

George Lamond singles chronology
"Without You" (1989)	"Bad of the Heart" (1990)	"Look into My Eyes" (1990)

"Bad of the Heart" is a song by American freestyle singer George Lamond, released in March 1990 by Columbia Records as the second single from his debut album, Bad of the Heart (1990). It became his biggest hit, peaking at numbers 25 and 30 on the US Billboard Hot 100 and Cash Box Top 100 charts. It was written by Philip Andreula, Marilyn Rodriguez and with production by Mark Liggett and Chris Barbosa.

== Track listing ==
US CD maxi-single

No.	Title	Length
1.	"Bad of the Heart" (Single Edit)	3:55
2.	"Bad of the Heart" (Album Version)	4:08
3.	"Bad of the Heart" (Club Mix)	7:52
4.	"Bad of the Heart" (Dub Mix)	6:04
5.	"Bad of the Heart" (Acapella Mix)	7:20

US 12" single

No.	Title	Length
1.	"Bad of the Heart" (Club Mix)
2.	"Bad of the Heart" (Radio Edit)
3.	"Bad of the Heart" (Dope Mix)
4.	"Bad of the Heart" (1990 Club Remix)
5.	"Bad of the Heart" (1990 Instrumental House Remix)
6.	"Bad of the Heart" (Acapella Mix)

== Charts ==
Chart (1990)	Peak Position
Australia (ARIA)	148
US Billboard Hot 100	25
US Hot Dance Music/Club Play (Billboard)	5
US Hot Dance Music/Maxi-Singles Sales (Billboard)	4
US Cash Box Top 100	30
