= Bad of the Heart (album) =

Studio album by George Lamond
- Released: July 16, 1990
- Genre: Latin freestyle
- Length: 46:10
- Label: CBS/Columbia
- Producer: Mark Liggett, Chris Barbosa, Phillip Andreula

George Lamond chronology
Bad of the Heart (1990)	In My Life (1992)

Singles from Bad of the Heart
- 1. "Without You" Released: August 14, 1989; 2. "Bad of the Heart" Released: March 22, 1990; 3. "Look into My Eyes" Released: August 2, 1990; 4. "No Matter What" Released: November 8, 1990; 5. "Love's Contagious" Released: May 14, 1991

Professional ratings
Review scores
Source	Rating
AllMusic	2/5 stars
Entertainment Weekly	B

Bad of the Heart is the debut studio album by the Latin freestyle singer George Lamond. It was released on July 16, 1990, by CBS Records/Columbia Records. The album's title track scored Lamond his biggest hit single to date, when the tune reached No. 25 on the U.S. pop charts in early 1990.

== Track listing ==
No.	Title	Writer(s)	Length
1.	"Bad of the Heart"	Philip Andreula, Marilyn Rodriguez	4:20
2.	"Love's Contagious"	John Bastianelli, Larry Lange	5:29
3.	"Serenade You"	Alexandra Forbes, Chris Grisonich	3:36
4.	"Passing Time"	Andreula	4:25
5.	"Without You"	Andreula	4:42
6.	"Stop That Girl"	Kristian Ottestad, Ole Paulsen, Michael Wilkie	4:36
7.	"Who Needs Love"	Dave Carlock, Lange	4:41
8.	"Look into My Eyes"	Andreula, Dominic Marabeti	5:17
9.	"What Could've Been"	Carlock	4:48
10.	"No Matter What" (Duet with Brenda K. Starr)	Lange, Annie Godwin	4:35

== Personnel ==
- Tony Aliprantis – engineer
- Philip Andreula – keyboards
- Chris Barbosa – producer, engineer, mixing
- George "Spin Twin" Barcia – assistant engineer
- John Bastianelli – arranger, saxophone
- Quinn Batson – assistant engineer
- Dave Carlock – arranger, backing vocals
- Debbie Cole – backing vocals
- Tom Coyne – mastering
- Maurice Crutcher – keyboards
- Bill Cunliff – keyboards
- Tony Fielding – backing vocals
- Mark Hubbard – assistant engineer
- David Jurman – executive producer
- Ted Karas – guitar
- George Lamond – vocals, backing vocals
- Jerry Lane – guitar, engineer, mixing
- Brad LeBeau – executive producer
- Mark Liggett – producer, engineer, mixing
- Mike Lorello – keyboards, engineer
- Tom Mandel – keyboards
- Anthony Papamichael – engineer
- Joey Norosavage – keyboards
- Frank Ockenfels – photography
- Leroy Quintyn – assistant engineer
- Evan Rodgers – backing vocals
- C.P. Roth – keyboards
- Steve Schmidt – keyboards
- Tony Sellari – art direction
- Matthew "Ammo" Senatore – rap
- Michael Sharfe – bass
- Danielle Spagnolo – backing vocals
- Brenda K. Starr – vocals
- Kevin Thomas – assistant engineer
- Tommy Uzzo – engineer, mixing
- Frank Vilardi – percussion
- Randy Villars – saxophone
- Matt Yelton – keyboards, backing vocals

== Charts ==
Album - Billboard (United States)

Year	Chart	Position
1990	The Billboard 200	104

Singles - Billboard (United States)

Year	Single	Chart	Position
1989	"Without You"	Hot Dance Music/Club Play	4
1989	"Without You"	Hot Dance Music/Maxi-Singles Sales	32
1990	"Bad of the Heart"	Hot Dance Music/Club Play	5
1990	"Bad of the Heart"	Hot Dance Music/Maxi-Singles Sales	4
1990	"Bad of the Heart"	The Billboard Hot 100	25
1990	"Look into My Eyes"	Hot Dance Music/Club Play	4
1990	"Look into My Eyes"	Hot Dance Music/Maxi-Singles Sales	6
1990	"Look into My Eyes"	The Billboard Hot 100	63
1990	"No Matter What"	The Billboard Hot 100	49
1991	"Love's Contagious"	Hot Dance Music/Maxi-Singles Sales	40
