= Dark Latin Groove (album) =

Studio album by DLG (Dark Latin Groove)
- Released: April 16, 1996
- Genre: Salsa, Reggae
- Length: 37:31
- Label: Sony Discos

DLG (Dark Latin Groove) chronology
Dark Latin Groove (1996)	Swing On (1997)

Singles from Dark Latin Groove
- 1. "No Morirá (No Matter What)" Released: March 1996; 2. "Todo Mi Corazón" Released: 1996

Dark Latin Groove is the debut studio album by American salsa group Dark Latin Groove. The album peaked at #35 on the Top Latin Albums chart and #5 on the Tropical Albums chart. The album received a Grammy nomination for Best Tropical Latin Album.

== Track listing ==
1. No Morirá (No Matter What) - 4:31
2. Me Va an Extrañar (Unchain My Heart) - 4:41
3. Dark Latin Groove - 4:42
4. Si Tú No Estás - 4:44
5. Muévete - 4:36
6. Todo Mi Corazón - 4:59
7. Triste y Solo (Broken Hearted) - 4:58
8. Suéltame - 4:20
