= Gotcha! (album) =

Studio album by DLG (Dark Latin Groove)
- Released: April 13, 1999
- Genres: Salsa, Reggae, Bachata
- Length: 48:25
- Label: Sony Music Entertainment

DLG (Dark Latin Groove) chronology
Swing On (1997)	Gotcha! (1999)	Renacer (2008)

Singles from Gotcha!
- 1. "Volveré" Released: 1999; 2. "A Veces Me Pregunto" Released: 1999

Professional ratings
Review scores
Source	Rating
Allmusic	4/5 stars

Gotcha! is the third album released by the salsa band DLG on April 13, 1999 by Sony Music. It includes well known singles such as Volvere. It is the last album to feature Huey Dunbar as the lead singer. It received a Grammy nomination for Best Salsa Album.

== Track listing ==
1. "Volveré" - 4:51
2. "Eres Mi Vida" - 4:52
3. "Got a Hook On You" (DLG Blues) - 5:00
4. "Acuyuyé" - 4:52
5. "Ángeles" - 4:50
6. "A Veces Me Pregunto" - 4:50
7. "De Oro" - 4:32
8. "Prisionero" - 4:51
9. "Gotcha" - 5:11
10. "Volveré" (Bachata) - 4:36
11. "La Quiero a Morir" (Bonus Track) - 5:01

== Personnel ==
- Composer - Alejandro Jaén
- Acoustic Guitar, Electric Guitar - Bernd Schoenhart
- Guitar - Ceasar A. Fernandez
- Guest Artist - Chika
- Primary Artist - DLG (Dark Latin Groove)
- Stylist - Estée Ochoa
- Vocals, Background Vocals - Huey Dunbar
- Composer - Ignacio Roman
- Timbales - Jeff Lopez
- Composer - Johnny Colon
- Composer, Flute, Guest Artist - Johnny Pacheco
- Vocals, Background Vocals - Julio Barreto
- Engineer, Mixing - Kurt Upper
- Photography - Kwaku Alston
- Violin - Lewis Kahn
- Composer - Manny Benito
- Engineer - Mario DeJesús
- Art Direction, Artwork - Mr. Scaramanga
- Trombone - Ozzie Melendez
- Composer - Paco Cepero
- Trumpet - Raul Agraz
- Bongos, Percussion - Ray Colón
- Congas - Richie Flores
- Bass - Rubén Rodríguez
- Guira - Samuel "Neco" Jimenez
- Art Direction, Design - Scaramanga
- Arranger, Composer, Drum Programming, Drums, Keyboards, Mixing, Piano, Producer, Vocals, Background Vocals, Vocoder - Sergio George
- Mastering - Vladimir Meller
- Trombone - William Cepeda
- Composer - Yoel Henríquez

== Chart position ==
Year	Chart	Album	Peak
1999	Billboard Heatseekers	Gotcha!	28
1999	Billboard Top Latin Albums	Gotcha!	8
1999	Billboard Latin Tropical Albums	Gotcha!	3

== Certification ==
Region	Certification	Certified units/sales
Uruguay (CUD)	Gold	3,000^{^}
^{^} Shipments figures based on certification alone.
