= Rodolfo Castillo =

Costa Rican weightlifter (1932–1994)

Personal information
- Full name: Rodolfo Ramón de Jesús Castillo Vargas
- Born: 7 December 1932 San José, Costa Rica
- Died: 13 July 1994 (aged 61)

Sport
- Sport: Weightlifting

Rodolfo Ramón de Jesús Castillo Vargas (7 December 1932 – 13 July 1994) was a Costa Rican weightlifter. He competed in the men's light heavyweight event where he placed 21st. He was the flag bearer for Costa Rica at the 1968 Summer Olympics. Castillo died on 13 July 1994, at the age of 61.
