= George Lamond =

American singer (born 1967)

George LaMond
- Also known as: George "LaMond"
- Born: George LaMond Garcia; February 25, 1967 (age 59); Washington, D.C.
- Origin: The Bronx, New York
- Genres: Pop; dance; freestyle; salsa
- Occupation: Singer-songwriter-Actor
- Instrument: Vocals
- Works: Lehman Center For The Performing Arts Presents I Like It Like That The Musical. The first segment, "Songs from The Capeman," ran for six nights in early April 2008.
- Years active: 1989–present
- Labels: Columbia/SME Records; Timber/Tommy Boy Records; Robbins Entertainment

George Lamond (born George Garcia, February 25, 1967), sometimes styled George LaMond, is an American freestyle music and salsa music singer.

LaMond has released seven albums (five via Sony Music) between 1990 and 2014. Best known for his 1990 number 25 Billboard Hot 100 debut, "Bad of the Heart" and his number one 1999 salsa smash, "Que Te Vas", he also had a 2008 local radio hit with "Don't Stop Believin'".

== Early life ==
Lamond was born George Garcia in the Georgetown neighborhood of Washington, D.C. He moved to his parents' native Puerto Rico at age 2. He remained in Puerto Rico until the age of 7, at which point the family (which included eight other siblings) returned to the contiguous U.S., settling in The Bronx, where he primarily grew up.

== Career ==
Freestyle (also known as club or Latin hip-hop), was a subgenre of Hip-hop fused with Salsa music (most noted in the percussion) whose origins go back to the early 1980s in the Latino communities of New York City. By the mid-to-late 80s, freestyle would cross over to non-Latinos with support by Anglo radio stations across the U.S. with artists such as Shannon, Expose, Lisa Lisa, The Cover Girls, and Stevie B. Freestyle would see the mainstream and gain a Pop music moniker with the success of such titles as Madonna's "Get into the Groove".

In 1988 Lamond's debut single "Bad of the Heart" was released on the indie label, Ligosa Records, credited to the group Loose Touch, with George Lamond as the lead singer. The song was an underground success, so the producers and label co-owners, Mark Liggett and Chris Barbosa, sought a major record label deal for Lamond. Lamond's signature vocals quickly caught the attention of Columbia Records, who signed him and released "Without You" as his first major label solo single in 1989.

This was followed in 1990 by a re-release of the single "Bad of the Heart" and a debut album, also titled Bad of the Heart; the single peaked at number 25 on the Billboard Hot 100 and the album produced mildly successful follow-up singles "Look Into My Eyes" and "No Matter What", the latter of which is a duet with Brenda K. Starr that reached the top 50 of the Hot 100. The album's fifth single, "Love's Contagious", failed to make the pop chart.

Lamond enjoyed an opening slot on the North American leg of the New Kids On The Block tour, playing stadiums throughout the U.S. He would go on to cover the NKOTB hit "Baby, I Believe in You" on his next album, releasing the tune as the album's second single.

In 1992, In My Life, Lamond's sophomore album was released, bolstered by the lead single, "Where Does That Leave Love", which peaked at number 59 on the Hot 100. The album contained a solid mix of freestyle and pop along with a couple ballads, all intended to further build his name within mainstream music. However, national pop radio, at the time, was going through a seismic shift, with a heavy R&B influence. "Baby, I Believe in You" only made it to number 66 on the Hot 100, and by the Spring 1993 release of the album's third and final single, "I Want You Back", a remake of the Jackson 5 classic featuring a then-relatively unknown Marc Anthony on backing vocals, Lamond was no longer a priority as far as promotion, and he would subsequently be dropped from Columbia Records.

Later in 1993, Lamond released his third album, and his first Spanish-language album, Creo En Ti, via Sony Discos, spawning two top 15 Billboard Latin Singles, "Baby, Creo En Ti" and "No Morira", the latter of which featured featuring Lisa Lopez. However, label support at Sony Discos ceased once Columbia Records ended his contract.

Touring continued well into the late 1990s. In 1998 Timber! / Tommy Boy records re-released "Without You 98" with various remixes by Willie Valentin. In 1999, while high-profile Latin music stars such as Ricky Martin and Marc Anthony engineered successful crossovers to the mainstream Anglo world, Lamond did just the opposite by returning to his roots to record salsa music in Spanish. His fourth album, Entrega (Prestigio/Sony Discos), went RIAA-certified gold. The album was bolstered by the smash lead single, "Que Te Vas", which peaked at number 23 on Billboard's Hot Latin Songs chart and number six on Billboard's Latin Tropical/Salsa Airplay chart.

Also in 1999, The Hits and More, Lamond's fifth album was released on Robbins Entertainment, containing a collection of his former Anglo hits along with new material. The album included a special appearance by K7 as well as freestyle producer, Carlos "After Dark" Berrios, along with Lamond's long-time producer, Chris Barbosa.

In late 1999, Lamond was approached by producer Robert Clivilles, to be a part of a male group project for Sony Music Japan. Lamond accepted the offer, and over the next six months, Urban Society, as the group would later be named, recorded a full-length album with Lamond's vocals. It was the first time Lamond ever recorded a completely pop album. Due to contract issues with Sony Japan, the album's Asian release was delayed several times until it was ultimately shelved.

In 2001, Lamond released his sixth album, GL, his sophomore salsa album, which reached number 15 on Billboard's Tropical/Salsa Albums chart. The first single, "Jurare Quererte", peaked at number 20 on Billboard's Latin Tropical/Salsa Airplay chart. The follow-up single, "Volver Amar", peaked at number 35 on Billboard's Latin Tropical\Salsa Airplay chart.

=== Mid 2000s ===
As the Latin music business, in particular, began to recover in the mid-2000s, largely due to the rise of reggaeton, Lamond released his seventh studio album, Oye Mi Canto, in 2006 on Sony International.

In 2008, after a hiatus from recording, a producer-friend, Giuseppe D, presented Lamond the idea to release a dance-pop cover of Journey's song "Don't Stop Believing". Released on Robbins Entertainment, Lamond's cover reached #1 on New York's 103.5 KTU radio. The release also found success on other U.S. radio stations, especially in the Northeast and Canada. WKTU presented Lamond with a Lifetime Achievement Award in 2009.

On October 24, 2014, at Resorts World Casino in New York City, Lamond performed in a 25th anniversary show, in which he debuted new English and salsa material from a forthcoming album slated for early 2015.

== Personal life ==
Lamond lives in Staten Island with his three sons.

== Discography ==
=== Albums ===
- Bad of the Heart (1990, Columbia Records)
- In My Life (1992, Columbia Records)
- Creo En Ti (1993, Sony International)
- Entrega (1999, Sony Records)
- The Hits And More (1999, Robbins Entertainment)
- GL (2001, Sony International)
- Oye Mi Canto (2006, Sony International)

=== Singles ===
- "Without You" (1989, Columbia Records)
- "Bad Of The Heart" (1990, Columbia Records, US #25)
- "Look into My Eyes" (1990, Columbia Records, US #63)
- "No Matter What" - duet with Brenda K. Starr (1990, Columbia Records, US #49)
- "Love's Contagious" (1991, Columbia Records)
- "Where Does That Leave Love?" (1992, Columbia Records, US #59)
- "Baby, I Believe In You" (1992, Columbia Records, US #66 - originally recorded by New Kids on the Block; features a sample of "(They Long to Be) Close to You" by The Carpenters)
- "I Want You Back" (1993, Columbia Records - cover of the Jackson 5 hit song)
- "Baby, Creo En Ti" (Sony Discos)
- "No Morira" - duet with Lisa Lopez (Sony Discos)
- "It's Always You" (1994, Tommy Boy Records)
- "Without You" (1998, Tommy Boy Records)
- "Earn My Love" (Robbins Entertainment)
- "Que Te Vas" (1999, Sony Discos)
- "Entrega" (1999)
- "Lately" (2000, Robbins Entertainment)
- "Jurare Quererte" (2001)
- "Volver Amar" (2001)
- "Raspa" (2006, Sony Discos)
- "Don't Stop Believin'" (2008, Robbins Entertainment)
- "Something About You" (2009)
- "Bringing My Love Down" (2013)

== See also ==
- French immigration to Puerto Rico
- Nuyorican
- Puerto Ricans in New York City
