= John Ancrum Winslow =

United States Navy admiral (1811–1873)

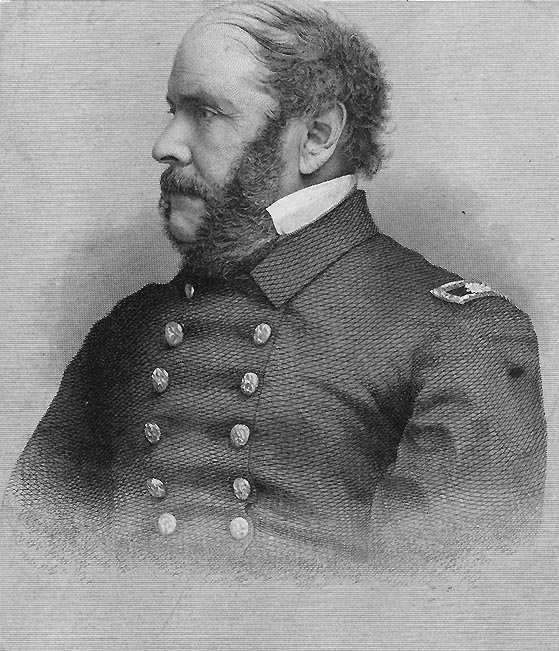
- Born: November 19, 1811; Wilmington, North Carolina, U.S.
- Died: September 29, 1873 (aged 61); Boston, Massachusetts, U.S.
- Burial place: Forest Hills Cemetery, Boston
- Military career
- Allegiance: United States
- Branch: United States Navy
- Service years: 1827–1873
- Rank: Rear admiral
- Commands: USS Kearsarge; Pacific Squadron
- Conflicts: Mexican–American War: Mosquito Fleet Campaign; Battle of Veracruz; American Civil War: Battle of Cherbourg

John Ancrum Winslow (19 November 1811 – 29 September 1873) was an officer in the United States Navy during the Mexican–American War and the American Civil War. He was in command of the steam sloop of war USS Kearsarge during her historic 1864 action off Cherbourg, France, with the Confederate sea raider CSS Alabama.

== Early life and career ==
Although born in Wilmington, North Carolina, Winslow was a member of the old New England Winslow family, a descendant of Mayflower passenger Mary Chilton and her husband John Winslow, who was a brother of Pilgrim father Edward Winslow. One of his first cousins was Francis Winslow (I) (1818–1862), who also joined the Navy, becoming a Commander, who also fought in the Civil War and who died of yellow fever in 1862 while in command of the R. R. Cuyler. Winslow's descendants included grandson Eben Eveleth Winslow, a U.S. Army brigadier general. John Winslow was educated in the North and became an ardent abolitionist.

He entered the Navy as a midshipman on 1 February 1827, became a passed midshipman on 10 June 1833, and was commissioned a lieutenant on 9 February 1839. During the Mexican War he took part in the expeditions against Tabasco, Tampico, and Tuxpan, and was present at the fall of Veracruz. For his gallantry in action he was allowed to have command of the schooner USS Union, which had been captured at Tampico in November 1846 and was taken into service, but she was poorly equipped and was lost on a reef off Veracruz on 16 December 1846. While serving at Tabasco during the Mexican–American War, he was commended for gallantry in action by Commodore Matthew Perry. He shared a shipboard cabin with his later adversary, Raphael Semmes. The two officers served together on Cumberland, Semmes as the ship's flag lieutenant and Winslow as a division officer. The two, however, never mention this fact in their respective autobiographies.

He was executive of the sloop Saratoga in the Gulf of Mexico in 1848–49, at the Boston Navy Yard in 1849–50, and in the frigate St. Lawrence of the Pacific Squadron in 1851–55. He was promoted to commander on 14 September 1855.

== Civil War service ==
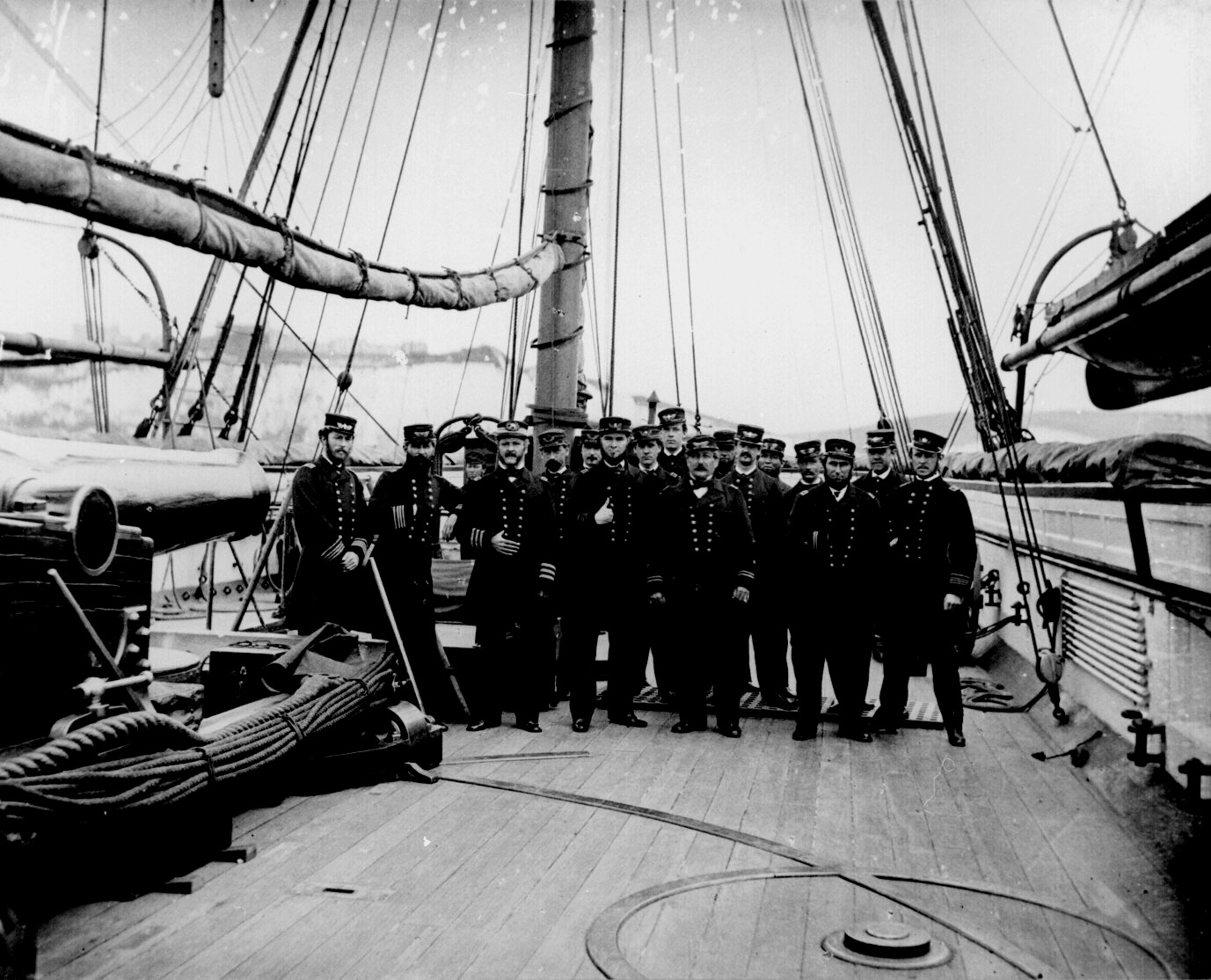
Capt. John A. Winslow (3d from left) and officers on board the USS Kearsarge after sinking the CSS Alabama, 1864

The outbreak of the Civil War found Winslow serving ashore as commanding officer of the 2d Lighthouse District. He decided to stay with the Union, probably due to his New England roots, anti-slavery views, and his wife, who was another of his first cousins, also from Boston. After Flag Officer Andrew H. Foote relieved Commander John Rodgers in command of the Western Flotilla, he requested that Winslow be sent west to assist him as executive officer. At Cairo, Illinois, Winslow labored to fit out and man gunboats for service on the Mississippi River and its tributaries. In October 1861, he assumed command of Benton at St. Louis, Missouri. As that deep-draft gunboat was steaming down river to Cairo, she ran aground on a sandbar. While attempting to refloat the ship, Winslow was badly injured by a flying chain link and forced to return home late in the year to recover. When he was able to return to duty in the summer of 1862, Winslow was given comparatively minor assignments. He contracted malaria, became discontented, and asked to be reassigned to other duty.

Detached from the Mississippi Squadron, Winslow returned to his home in Roxbury, Massachusetts, early in November and was confined to bed there for a month attempting to regain his health. On 5 December 1862, orders arrived directing him to proceed via New York City to the Azores, where he was to assume command of the screw sloop USS Kearsarge. Two days later, he went to New York where he embarked in Vanderbilt for passage to Fayal. However, when he reached that island on Christmas Eve, he found that Kearsarge had sailed to Spain for repairs, and he was forced to remain at Fayal until spring. When the screw sloop finally returned early in April 1863, he assumed command.

In Kearsarge, he cruised among the Azores seeking Confederate commerce raider CSS Alabama until autumn when he shifted to European waters. At Ferrol, Spain, Winslow learned that CSS Florida was at Brest, France, undergoing overhaul; he promptly sailed for that port to prevent her from slipping out to sea again. While keeping track of the progress of the repair work on the Southern warship through the U.S. diplomatic and espionage network, he also made runs along the coast of western Europe, checking on rumors of other Confederate raiders in the area. He also rigorously drilled his crew in naval gunnery, which stood them in good stead in the battle to come.

In January 1864, Kearsarge returned to Cádiz for naval stores and repairs, and while she was away from Brest, Florida put to sea on 18 February. When Kearsarge returned and learned that the quarry had escaped, she shifted to Calais, France, where CSS Rappahannock was moored. On 12 June, while moored in the Scheldt off Vlissingen (Flushing), Winslow received a telegram informing him that Alabama was at Cherbourg, a French naval port.

=== Battle with Alabama ===
Capt. Winslow arrived off Cherbourg 14 June 1864, where he found the Alabama and blockaded her in the harbor. The Alabama made preparations for battle, and Capt. Raphael Semmes caused Winslow to be informed of this intention through the U. S. consul. On Sunday, 19 June 1864, he was lying 3 miles (5 km) off the eastern entrance of the harbor when the Alabama came out, escorted by a French iron-clad and the English yacht Deerhound. Winslow steamed off 7 miles (11 km) from the shore so as to be beyond the neutral ground, and then steamed toward the Alabama. The armament of the Kearsarge was seven guns, and that of the Alabama eight guns, including a 100-pound Blakely rifle. The Kearsarge was slightly faster, and had 163 men, while the Alabama had 149. The Kearsarge had a definitive advantage over the Confederate ship in that it had a concealed iron chain over its wooden hull, but victory over the Alabama was not certain.

When Winslow turned to approach, the Alabama opened fire from a raking position at a distance of one mile at 10:57 a.m. He kept on at full speed, receiving a second broadside and part of a third, when he sheered off and returned the fire from his starboard battery. Both vessels circled around a common centre, and neared each other to within 600 yards. The sides of the Alabama were torn out by the shells, and at noon, after the action had continued for one hour, she headed for the shore to get into neutral waters, then 5 miles (8 km) distant. This exposed her port side, and she could only bring two guns to bear. The ship was filling, and Winslow approached so rapidly that Semmes hauled down his flag. Winslow stopped the ship, but continued to fire, uncertain whether the Alabama had surrendered.

A white flag was then shown, and Winslow ceased firing. A boat from the Alabama then came alongside to announce the surrender, and was allowed to go back to bring off the Alabama's officers and crew, but she did not return. The yacht Deerhound then came up. The Deerhound picked up 39 persons, including Semmes and fourteen of his officers, after which she went off and sailed to Southampton.

The engagement lasted an hour and twenty minutes. After the last shot was fired the Alabama sank out of sight. She had about 40 killed, and 70 were made prisoners, so that 39 escaped. Only three men were wounded in the Kearsarge, one of whom died. The Alabama outshot the Kearsarge two to one. Only 28 projectiles struck the Kearsarge out of the 370 that were fired by the Alabama, and none of these did any material damage, due to the anchor chains protecting the Kearsarge hull. One 100-pound shell exploded in the smoke-stack, and one lodged in the stern-post of the Kearsarge, but did not explode. The Kearsarge fired 173 projectiles, and few failed to do some injury.

Winslow's victory earned him promotion to Commodore, backdated to the day of the battle, and the Thanks of Congress.

== Later career and legacy ==
Advanced to rear admiral in 1870, Winslow commanded the Pacific Squadron from that year to 1872. He was always known as a solid, courageous, determined officer. Shortly after his retirement, he died in Boston, and is buried at Forest Hills Cemetery in Jamaica Plain. His coffin was draped in the Kearsarge's battle flag, and a slab of stone from Mount Kearsarge in New Hampshire covers his grave.

Two ships in the United States Navy have been named USS Winslow for him. A third Winslow honored him and his first cousin once removed, Admiral Cameron McRae Winslow (second son of Francis Winslow (I)). New Hampshire's Winslow State Park, on the north side of Mount Kearsarge, is indirectly named for him.

He was the father of Rear Admiral Herbert Winslow (1848–1914).

== Dates of rank ==
- Midshipman - 1 February 1827
- Passed Midshipman - 10 June 1833
- Lieutenant - 9 December 1839
- Commander - 14 September 1855
- Captain - 16 July 1862
- Commodore - 19 June 1864
- Rear Admiral - 2 March 1870
- Died - 29 September 1873

== See also ==
- Bibliography of early United States naval history
- Bibliography of the American Civil War
- List of ships captured in the 19th century

== Sources ==
- Ellicott, John Morris (1905). The life of John Ancrum Winslow, rear-admiral, United States navy, who commanded the U.S. steamer "Kearsarge" in her action with the Confederate cruiser "Alabama";. New York and London, G.P. Putnam's sons.
- Kell, John McIntosh (1900). Recollections of a naval life : including the cruises of the Confederate States steamers "Sumpter" and "Alabama". Washington : Neale.
