= No Matter What (George Lamond and Brenda K. Starr song) =

Single by George Lamond with Brenda K. Starr

from the album Bad of the Heart
- Released: November 8, 1990
- Genre: Dance-pop, Freestyle
- Length: 4:35 (album version)
- Label: Columbia
- Songwriters: Anne Godwin, Larry Lange
- Producers: Mark Liggett, Chris Barbosa

George Lamond singles chronology
"Look into My Eyes" (1990)	"No Matter What" (1990)	"Love's Contagious" (1991)

Brenda K. Starr singles chronology
"Straight from the Heart" (1988)	"No Matter What" (1990)	"If You Could Read My Mind" (1991)

Lisa Lopez singles chronology
"Vuelve a Mi" (1992)	"No Morirá" (1993)

"No Matter What" is a song by American freestyle singer George Lamond featuring American singer Brenda K. Starr. It was released in November 1990 by Columbia Records as the fourth single from Lamond's debut album, Bad of the Heart (1990). In 1993, he recorded a Spanish-language version as "No Morirá" with Lisa Lopez on his album Creo en Ti. "No Matter What" peaked at numbers 42 and 49 on the US Cash Box Top 100 and Billboard Hot 100 charts.

== Track listing ==
US CD single

No.	Title	Length
1.	"No Matter What"	4:35

== Charts ==
Chart (1991)	Peak Position
US Billboard Hot 100	49
US Cash Box Top 100	42
Chart (1993)	Peak Position
US Hot Latin Songs (Billboard) "Spanish version: "No Morirá"	15

== Dark Latin Groove version ==
"No Morirá (No Matter What)"

Single by Dark Latin Groove

from the album Dark Latin Groove
- Released: March 1996
- Genre: Salsa
- Length: 4:31
- Label: Sony Discos
- Songwriters: Anne Godwin, Larry Lange, Jorge Luis Piloto
- Producer: Sergio George

Dark Latin Groove singles chronology
"No Morirá (No Matter What)" (1996)	"Todo Mi Corazón" (1996)

In 1996, New York salsa band Dark Latin Groove covered "No Morirá" as their debut single from the eponymous album. The single peak at #12 on the Hot Latin Tracks chart and #1 on the Latin Tropical Airplay. The single spent three weeks at #1 on the chart. Jorge Luis Piloto received an award at the Tropical category on the American Society of Composers, Authors and Publishers Awards of 1997.

=== Weekly charts ===
Chart (1996)	Peak Position
US Hot Latin Songs (Billboard)	12
US Latin Pop Airplay (Billboard)	7
US Tropical Songs (Billboard)	1

=== Year-end charts ===
Chart (1996)	Peak position
U.S. Latin Tropical Airplay (Billboard)	4

== See also ==
- List of Billboard Tropical Airplay number ones of 1996
