= Anne Goodwin Winslow =

American writer (1875–1959)

- Born: Anne Goodwin; June 14, 1875; Raleigh, Tennessee, U.S.
- Died: November 25, 1959 (aged 84); Raleigh, Tennessee, US
- Occupation: Writer
- Spouse: Eben Eveleth Winslow
- Children: Williamson Randolph Winslow, Mary Winslow Chapman

Anne Goodwin Winslow (June 14, 1875 – November 25, 1959) was an American novelist and short-story writer who published her first work of prose at the age of 68.

== Life ==
Born and raised outside Memphis, Tennessee, she married Eben Eveleth Winslow, an officer in the Army Corps of Engineers who had been the number one graduate in the class of 1889 at West Point. He designed and superintended construction of the fortifications at Fort DeRussy in Hawaii and along the Panama Canal. They had two children: Williamson Randolph Winslow, born 1901, and Mary Winslow, born 1903.

Eveleth Winslow retired with the rank of Brigadier General in 1922 and the couple moved back to her family home, Goodwinslow, near Raleigh. There, she began to write poetry, which was published in Harper's, The Century, Scribner's, and The Atlantic. In 1925, a selection of her poems, The Long Gallery, was published. The New York Times' reviewer assessed that the book "reveals a graceful but limited talent" and that her work suggested "an achieved maturity: in other words, she seems to have reached the highest plane possible for her talent." After her husband died in 1928, Anne Goodwin Winslow stayed on at Goodwinslow, where she hosted visits from numerous writers, including Robert Penn Warren, Ford Maddox Ford, Vachel Lindsay, Eudora Welty, Richard Halliburton, Allen Tate, Caroline Gordon, and John Crowe Ransom.

Their son, Randolph, followed in his father's footsteps, attending West Point and becoming an officer in the Army Corps of Engineers. He married the artist Marcella Comès Winslow in 1934. Comès' letters to her mother-in-law were published in 1993 as Brushes With the Literary: Letters of a Washington Artist 1943–1959.

In 1943, she published her first work of prose, a memoir of life at Goodwinslow titled The Dwelling Place. Her intention, she later said, was "to give something of the feeling of the life that has gone on about me in this place ... to throw a little light on one corner of the American scene." Kirkus Reviews described it as "Full of incident, it leaves a feeling of peace, contentment and good living.". Two years later—and just one month after her son Randolph died of pneumonia while serving with the U. S. Army in Europe, she published her first work of fiction, A Winter in Geneva, which included one novelette and seven short stories. In reviewing the book, Albert Jay Nock called Winslow "the most exquisite of miniaturists."

Her first novel, Cloudy Trophies, published in 1946 was set in Washington, DC and took as its protagonist the wife of a Southern senator. Although he compared Winslow's writing to that of Edith Wharton, The New York Times' Orville Prescott concluded that the book "... promises much, but produces little. The beauty and the wisdom and the wit it offers would have been ever so much more effective if condensed into a short story or elaborated in an essay.". Her second novel, A Quiet Neighborhood (1947), was set in a Southern town in the late 19th century. Her best-received novel, The Springs, was published in early 1949. Prescott called it one of the ten best books of 1949, writing that, "Its combination of serene wisdom with exquisite craftsmanship gives it a unique distinction." Before the end of the year, she published her last novel, It Was Like This, of which The New Yorker's reviewer wrote, "Mrs. Winslow can break a heart with less fuss and less talk than almost any other writer around." She continued to publish verse and a few short stories in various magazines until 1958.

She died at Goodwinslow on November 2, 1959. In a piece titled, "On the Death of an American Artist," Jacques Barzun wrote, "The qualities of Anne Winslow's fiction are a great precision in observing and telling, a capacity to render the passage of empty time, an ease and economy in evoking character and scene that makes for brevity but is neither arrogant nor dry. Her prevailing mood is an exquisitely quiet sadness, born of the misdoings of providence and the sense of the past."

== Works ==
- The Long Gallery, 1925
- The Dwelling Place, 1943
- A Winter in Geneva and Other Stories, 1945
- Cloudy Trophies, 1946
- A Quiet Neighborhood, 1947
- The Springs, 1949
- It Was Like This, 1949
