= Huey Dunbar =

American musician

Huey Dunbar is a singer and the former singer of Dark Latin Groove. His hits with the band included "La quiero a morir", "Juliana", "No Morirá", "Volveré", "Todo mi corazón", and a remake of Ricardo Montaner's original classic "Me va a extrañar". In 2000, he split up with DLG and began a solo career. For his first solo album he was awarded "Best New Artist" by Billboard magazine, and received a Grammy nomination. The album was certified Gold and Platinum by RIAA. In Billboard's Tropical Songs chart, the single "Te amaré" had moved from the number 9 song to number 4. "Huey Dunbar IV", debuted on the Tropical Albums chart at Number 2 on March 20, 2010.

== Discography ==
=== Albums ===
- Yo Si Me Enamoré - (2001)
- Music for My Peoples - (2003)
- Huey Dunbar IV - (2010)

=== Singles ===
- "Con Cada Beso" - (2001)
- Yo Sí Me Enamoré" - (2001)
- "A Cambio de Qué" - (2002)
- "Sin Poderte Hablar" - (2003)
- "A Dónde Iré" - (2003)
- " Amigos " (2007) ft Yan weynn Crescent Moon Studios Emilio Estefan
- "Te Amaré" - (2010)
- "De mi Enamorate" - (2023)
