= Dark Latin Groove =

American salsa band

DLG (Dark Latin Groove)
- Origin: New York City, New York, United States
- Genres: Salsa, reggae
- Years active: 1995–2000; 2007–2009; 2017–present
- Labels: Columbia; Sony Discos; FR Records
- Members: Fragancia Angel Manuel Dorian Planas
- Past members: Huey Dunbar, James "Da Barba" de Jesus, Yahaira Vargas (Miss YaYa), Sergio George

Dark Latin Groove (DLG) is a salsa band that mixes salsa, reggae and hip-hop. The group was brought together in New York by producer Sergio George (who also signed them to his record company Sir George Records) and included Huey Dunbar, Fragancia, and James "Da Barba" de Jesus.

== Beginnings ==
Looking for vocalists, Sergio George discovered within the salsa club scenes both Huey Dunbar and James "Da Barba" de Jesus. De Jesus had previously been a backup singer for both Tito Nieves and Sistah Souljah. Their first appearance took place in April 1996 when they performed alongside Sergio George, who took up keyboard.

== Breakup ==
After their third album in 2000, lead singer Huey Dunbar decided to break away from DLG to pursue a solo career. This essentially led to an anticipated breakup of the entire group. James DaBarba and Fragrancia formed a new DLG with a new female member.

== Rebirth ==
In 2007, DLG producer Sergio George announced that the group would resurface again. Dunbar rejected George's invitation to return to the group. Sergio's search for a new vocalist led him to "Miss YaYa", whose real name is Yahaira Vargas. She had previously participated in an American-Idol-like contest called 'Gigantes del Mañana' on the variety show Sabado Gigante in 2000. In addition, YaYa was on the first season of Sean P. Diddy Combs show Making the Band 3 in 2005 on MTV. Her manager contacted Sergio who reviewed her work and photos via myspace.com. They set up an interview in Florida with Sergio, and James "Da Barba".

The new DLG, with Miss YaYa and James Da Barba, was nominated for a 2009 Grammy in the "Best Tropical Album" category, and a 2009 Premio Lo Nuestro award for "Best Tropical Group."

In 2019 they released the single "Aquí Quién Manda Soy Yo! (feat. Willy Garcia)" and in 2020, the single "Por Qué Te Tengo Que Olvidar".

== Discography ==
=== Albums ===
- 1996: Dark Latin Groove
- 1997: Swing On
- 1999: Gotcha!
- 2007: Renacer
- 2018: Historias Sin Contar (album)

=== Compilations ===
- 2000: Greatest Hits
- 2000: Grandes Éxitos
- 2003: Serie Azul Tropical
- 2004: Lo Esencial
- 2005: 20 Éxitos Originales
- 2010: Mis Favoritas
